= Mother and Child Reunion (Degrassi: The Next Generation) =

- Degrassi: The Next Generation episodes
- Episode nos.: Season 1 Episodes 1 & 2
- Directed by: Bruce McDonald
- Story by: Yan Moore; Aaron Martin
- Teleplay by: Yan Moore
- Cinematography by: Gavin Smith
- Production codes: 101; 102
- Original air date: October 14, 2001
- Running time: 44 minutes

Episode chronology
← Previous —	Next → "Family Politics"
- Degrassi: The Next Generation (season 1)

"Mother and Child Reunion" is the two-part pilot episode of the Canadian teen drama television series Degrassi: The Next Generation, which premiered on October 14, 2001 on the CTV Television Network. The episode was written by story editor Aaron Martin and series co-creator/creative consultant Yan Moore, and directed by Bruce McDonald. As with the majority of Degrassi: The Next Generation episodes, "Mother and Child Reunion" takes its title from a pop song, "Mother and Child Reunion", written and performed by Paul Simon.

Degrassi: The Next Generation is the fourth series in the fictional Degrassi universe created in 1979. The preceding series, Degrassi High, ended in 1991, although a television movie, School's Out, aired in 1992 and wrapped up the storylines of the characters. "Mother and Child Reunion" reunited some of those characters in a ten-year high school reunion, while also introducing a new generation of Degrassi Community School students: Emma Nelson, Manny Santos, J.T. Yorke and Toby Isaacs.

The episode received mixed reviews from the mass media, with the Ottawa Citizen saying that it offers "nothing new to viewers familiar with the groundbreaking preceding series", and The Seattle Times saying it "soft-pedals through the issues", although the acting from the new generation of children was lauded as "stellar ... solid [and] believable" by Canoe.ca's AllPop. It was nominated for two Gemini Awards and two Directors Guild of Canada Awards, winning in the "Outstanding Achievement in a Television Series – Children's" category.

== Plot ==
=== Part One ===
Archie "Snake" Simpson (played by Stefan Brogren), a former student of Degrassi High, and now teacher at Degrassi Community School, has arranged a mixed reunion for the classes of 1990 and 1991. Spike Nelson (Amanda Stepto), Caitlin Ryan (Stacie Mistysyn), and Lucy Fernandez (Anais Granofsky), who also attended Degrassi High, plan on attending and try to persuade Joey Jeremiah (Pat Mastroianni) to join them. Joey, however, is reticent as he is still dealing with his grief over the death of his wife. Along with Caitlin's fiancé Keith (Don McKellar), the five friends go out to a bar for the night, reminiscing about the past and discussing their present lives.

Spike's daughter, Emma (played by Miriam McDonald) is told by her online boyfriend, Jordan, that he is coming to Toronto for a school field trip, and asks her if she would like to meet him for the first time. Her friends, Manny Santos (Cassie Steele), J.T. Yorke (Ryan Cooley) and Toby Isaacs (Jake Goldsbie) warn her of the potential dangers of meeting somebody she only knows from the Internet, and tell her that he could be an Internet stalker, pointing out that schools do not take field trips in the middle of summer. However, Emma is undeterred, convinced that Jordan is just a normal boy with whom she shares the same interests.

=== Part Two ===
At the reunion party, Joey and Caitlin meet Alison Hunter (Sara Holmes), another Degrassi High attendee. As the evening progresses, Joey overhears Keith and Alison flirting with each other and Keith reveals he does not want to marry Caitlin. When Joey confronts Keith, their argument turns into a physical altercation, and Alison has to tell Caitlin about Keith's hesitance over getting married. Joey and Caitlin have a heart-to-heart discussion about their past and their relationships, and after ten years, finally make amends after she forgives him for his affair with Tessa Campanelli, while Wheels (Neil Hope) apologizes to Lucy for crippling her while driving drunk nine years ago for which she forgives as she realized all he's been through since the death of his adoptive parents.

While her mother attends the reunion, Emma visits Jordan at his hotel, where she meets his teacher, Mr. Nystrom (Jeff Gruich). He takes her up to Jordan's hotel room, but as they enter, Emma sees that it is completely empty except for a video camera which has been set up. She immediately becomes suspicious and tries to escape, but Nystrom blocks her access to the bedroom door. She locks herself in the bathroom, and comes to the startling realization that Nystrom is Jordan. Nystrom apologizes and tells Emma he will let her go, but when she comes out of the bathroom, he grabs and restrains her.

Unable to get in contact with Emma, Manny tells Toby and J. T. that she is afraid that Emma may have gone to meet Jordan. They hack into Emma's email account and realize that Jordan has told her a number of lies. After discovering which hotel Emma is meeting Jordan at, they rush to the school to inform Spike. As Nystrom attempts to rape Emma, Spike and Snake arrive just in time to save her. Emma manages to break free from Nystrom and rushes out of the hotel room. Snake restrains Nystrom until the police arrive to take him away.

== Production ==
Linda Schuyler had co-created The Kids of Degrassi Street in 1979 with Kit Hood, and Yan Moore was a writer on that series. As the children grew up, the Degrassi franchise developed into Degrassi Junior High and Degrassi High. In 1999 two episodes of Jonovision, a CBC Television talk show aimed at teenagers, reunited some of the cast members from the series. At the same time, Schuyler and Moore were developing a new television drama. When the Jonovision reunion episode proved to be popular, Schuyler and Moore wondered about reuniting the characters, too. As the months passed, they began thinking about what might have happened to the characters of Degrassi High and realized that the character Emma Nelson, born at the end of Degrassi Junior High's second season, would soon be entering junior high school. Stephen Stohn, Schuyler's husband suggested Degrassi: The Next Generation as the name for the new sequel series, borrowing the concept from Star Trek: The Next Generation, of which he was a fan.

The new series was offered a place on a number of television networks, with CTV and CBC (the franchise's former network) vying as the top contenders. CTV won through, offering $10 million for a fifteen-episode season. The project was greenlit in May 2000, with the originally planned reunion episode serving as the pilot to the new series. CTV announced the new series at its annual press conference in June 2001, and said the pilot would air in the fall.

In contrast to the previous Degrassi series, which were filmed on and around De Grassi Street in Toronto, Ontario, Degrassi Junior High used Vincent Massey Public School, then known as Daisy Avenue Public School, as its primary filming location, and Centennial College was used in Degrassi High. Degrassi: The Next Generation is filmed at Epitome Pictures' studios in Toronto. A 100,000-square-foot (9,300 m^{2}) former printing factory was converted in 1997 for Epitome, consisting of four soundstages and a backlot. The exterior of Degrassi Community School was located on the studio's backlot, and used the same colours and glass pattern as Degrassi High's Centennial College.

Production on "Mother and Child Reunion" began earlier than expected, as CTV initially planned to launch the series in January 2002. At the eleventh hour the broadcaster decided to bring it forward to October 2001 to coincide with the back-to-school season. The episode was written by series co-creator Moore, also credited as creative consultant, and script editor Aaron Martin. Co-creator Schuyler, with her husband and Epitome Pictures partner Stohn, served as executive producers. The line producer was David Lowe. "Mother and Child Reunion" was directed by Bruce McDonald, who had previously directed the films Roadkill (1989), Highway 61 (1991), Hard Core Logo (1996), and the television series Queer as Folk (2001–2005). Epitome Pictures sought funding from the Government of Canada, through its two Crown corporations, Telefilm Canada and the Canadian Television Fund, which provide financial support to Canadian audiovisual productions. Filming began on July 3, before Epitome Pictures could finalize their contracts with Telefilm and the Television Fund. Other financial contributors included Royal Bank of Canada, Cogeco, Shaw Communications, and Bell Canada.

To appeal to Degrassi's established audience, a number of references to events which occurred in Degrassi Junior High, Degrassi High and School's Out were written into the episode. Throughout those two series, Joey would frequently wear a fedora which became that character's trademark prop. The fedora made a reappearance in this episode, and was worn by Manny, Spike, Snake, Caitlin and Lucy, but not Joey, and it appeared in every scene which featured a character from the old series.

Prior to the episode airing, a website was created with a "virtual school" in which fans could "enroll" in order to receive regular emails from their character "classmates" and discuss ongoing plots, in an effort to provide a complete viewing experience for the audience. As the broadcast date of the episode neared, more content was added to the website to make it appear as if it were a true school reunion website. The website was actually seen on screen when the characters Spike and Caitlin were reminiscing about their high school days.

"Mother and Child Reunion" aired on the terrestrial television network CTV on October 14, 2001, and was advertised as a television special. In the United States, it was broadcast on July 1, 2002, on the Noggin cable channel during its programming block for teenagers, The N; it served as the final episode of season one. In Australia, the episode aired on the terrestrial network ABC TV on August 1, 2002. The episode has been released on DVD as part of the complete first season DVD boxset, which was released in Canada on October 19, 2004, in the U.S. on September 28, 2004, and in Australia on September 8, 2010. The episode is also available at iTunes Stores to download and watch on home computers and certain iPod models, and at Zune Marketplace for the Xbox 360 and Zune media players.

== References to the original series ==
The two-part episode would also follow up on plotlines of the original series. The accident in the telemovie School's Out when Wheels hit Lucy while drunk driving was discussed twice, first at the bar when the characters were discussing their lives, and a second time when Wheels came to the reunion to apologize to Lucy. Finally, Joey and Caitlin made amends; their relationship had ended when he cheated on her with Tessa Campanelli in School's Out. Snake, who had been dating a girl named Pam by the end of School's Out, is still angry at Wheels for the accident. Lucy's eyesight is restored (whether in one or both eyes is unclear) and, having completed extensive physical therapy, she is able to walk well with the use of a cane; at the same time, she has completed an honours bachelor's degree, a master's degree and most of the work for a Ph.D. Joey and Caitlin have gone their separate ways and not seen each other in many years (though it is unclear if Alexa and Simon's wedding was the last time). Joey is now a used car dealer and a widowed father of a young daughter. His prediction for Caitlin, however, has come true: she lives in Los Angeles and is famous as the host of an environmental-political television series. At the reunion, Caitlin breaks up with her new fiancé Keith; as she takes off her ring while sitting alone with Joey, she asks him, "Bring back any memories?" Alexa and Simon are still married, as evidenced by the characters sitting together and her actress Irene Courakos being credited as "Alexa Dexter" vice "Alexa Pappadopoulos."

An interview of original cast members done in-character was included as a bonus feature on the Season 1 DVD. In the interviews, Alison Hunter says she is a waitress and wants to become a star in Hollywood. Dwayne Myers says that while he is HIV positive, he is AIDS free, and hopes to live ten more years. Kathleen Mead is shown being jealous of Caitlin's success after high school. She says she is pitching an idea for a new television show called "Mead in Canada." Diana Economopoulos is now Diana Platt; she and her husband are accountants. She has two children and brags about her website. Yick Yu says that he and Arthur Kobalewsky are co-owners of a web design company. Alexa and Simon Dexter live around Ottawa with their two children and Alexa now a quintessential soccer mom is pregnant with their third. Ricky is a lawyer and is helping write copyright laws for the internet. Rainbow is a documentary filmmaker. Liz O'Rourke says she is now working with the mentally disabled (although she is later revealed to be a midwife in the episode "Father Figure"). Trish Skye says she had problems but has been clean and sober for two years; she works at a funeral home and is a freelance writer. In the same video, Spike mentions that she bought out her mother's hair salon and comments on the "weird déjà vu" of Emma now attending Degrassi; Snake also appears and notes that he is a teacher at the titular school, and still single.

== Cast ==
"I was happy to hand the torch off to the new cast back in 2001. The old characters were originally going to be there for the one episode. I was very envious during the reunion special because I knew what was ahead for the new cast. I was looking at them, seeing myself, and thinking 'They're so green, they're so wide-eyed, and darn, I'm not going to be part of that'."

— Pat Mastroianni (Joey Jeremiah), 2005.

Producers were able to bring back a number of actors from Degrassi High to guest star as their characters for the reunion storyline. Stefan Brogren, Pat Mastroianni, Stacie Mistysyn and Amanda Stepto agreed early on to return for the episode to play their characters Archie "Snake" Simpson, Joey Jeremiah, Caitlin Ryan and Christine "Spike" Nelson respectively, and appeared at the CTV press conference in June to publicize the new series. Brogren and Stepto signed contracts to appear in the entire season. Dan Woods also returned to play Dan Raditch, now principal of Degrassi Community School. By the time "Mother and Child Reunion" began to shoot, twelve more former Degrassi High cast members had agreed to appear: Danah Jean Brown (Trish Skye), Darrin Brown (Dwayne Myers), Michael Carry (Simon Dexter), Irene Courakos (Alexa Pappadopoulos), Chrissa Erodotou (Diana Economopoulos), Anais Granofsky (Lucy Fernandez), Rebecca Haines (Kathleen Mead), Sara Holmes (Alison Hunter), Neil Hope (Derek "Wheels" Wheeler), Kyra Levy (Maya Goldberg), Cathy Keenan (Liz O'Rourke), and Siluck Saysanasy (Yick Yu) all reprised their roles.

For the new generation of students, the producers chose from six hundred auditionees, all of whom were children in an attempt to provide a group of characters that the target audience of teenagers could relate to, rather than actors in their twenties pretending to be teenagers, something other shows of the same period and target audience such as Buffy the Vampire Slayer and Dawson's Creek were doing. Miriam McDonald first auditioned in October 2000 to play Emma Nelson, Spike's daughter, and was selected for the role after a callback and three screen tests. Ryan Cooley appeared as J.T. Yorke, Jake Goldsbie as Toby Isaacs, and Cassie Steele as Manny Santos. All signed their contracts just days before appearing at the CTV press conference. Christina Schmidt appeared briefly as Terri McGreggor, and Melissa McIntyre appeared in just one scene as Ashley Kerwin; she had no lines to speak in this episode. Cassie Steele's sister, Alex Steele, made her first appearance as Angela Jeremiah, Joey's six-year-old daughter. She returned with Mastroianni to the series at the beginning of season two to take on more permanent roles.

Film director Kevin Smith, who had been a fan of Degrassi from the early 1990s when he worked at a convenience store in Leonardo, New Jersey, has paid homage to Degrassi by making reference to it in several of his films. For example, he named a Clerks character Caitlin Bree after Caitlin Ryan, his favorite Degrassi character, wrote Shannen Doherty's character Rene wearing a Degrassi jacket throughout his Mallrats film, and had Jason Lee's character in Chasing Amy specifically mention Degrassi Junior High as the television show he would rather be watching, instead of going out. At the press conference for the new series, Schuyler announced that Smith would appear in "Mother and Child Reunion" as Caitlin's boyfriend, but due to scheduling conflicts he was unable to film the role and it was passed on to Don McKellar. Smith and his View Askewniverse sidekick Jason Mewes later guest starred in Degrassi: The Next Generation for three episodes of season four, two episodes of season five, and four episodes of season eight.

== Reception ==
"When teens tune in, they're more likely to see actors who resemble their lab partner than the Holmes, Jacksons, and Van Der Beeks that people Dawson's Creek. They're going to see much more real kids. Remember the first season of Dawson's Creek? Where they were all saying, 'I may be 15', but in fact they were 18, 19, 20? But our kids are within a couple years of the characters they're playing. Degrassi is more of a reflection of what it's like to be a teen than Dawson's Creek, which have their place and everything, but you know, the kids on Dawson's Creek speak like they're PhD students compared to what normal kids speak."

— Yan Moore (co-creator/creative consultant), 2001.

"Mother and Child Reunion" received mixed reviews from the media. Stephanie McGrath of Canoe.ca's AllPop acknowledged Miriam McDonald's portrayal of Emma Nelson as "stellar acting abilities in a super creepy storyline ... high on tension, low on cheese [and] top-notch", and continued, "The young actors actually showed up their classic Degrassi counter-parts in the pilot episode. Their acting was solid, believable and age-appropriate, while some of the older crowd's dialogue sounded a bit stilted and over-rehearsed. Slightly wooden acting aside, it was still good to see Joey, Caitlin and the gang together again. Emma's story-line demonstrates that the creative forces behind The Next Generation haven't lost touch with teens yet, showing that one instalment of Degrassi: The Next Generation is worth 20 episodes of Dawson's Creek."

Tony Atherton of the Ottawa Citizen had mixed feelings of the new incarnation, saying it "has a cleaner, more polished look, has lost its edge [and offers] nothing new to viewers familiar with the groundbreaking preceding series, nor to anyone else who has watched the deluge of teen dramas since", adding that because there is "little ground left to break in teen drama there is a sense of déjà vu with regards to the plots and characters". He did, however, praise the show for having "the same simple narrative told from a kid's viewpoint, and the same regard for unvarnished reality [as Degrassi Junior High and Degrassi High]. It is light years from far-fetched high-school melodramas like Boston Public and Dawson's Creek ... is every bit as good as its beloved predecessor. In fact, in some respects it is even better".

When the series began in the U.S., The Seattle Times' Melanie McFarland was unsure whether its success and popularity in Canada would continue across the border. "As popular as Degrassi was, it was still a mere cult hit in the United States; the crowd that had access to it initially on PBS might not be able to tune into Noggin. Soft-pedaling through the issues might work for today's family of viewers, but what's gentle enough for Mom and Dad's peace of mind might not be enough to hook Junior or the original Degrassi's older fans". She was, however, "happy Noggin chose Degrassi students to navigate teen perils instead of digging up Screech and the gang [characters from Saved by the Bell] for another nauseating go-round".

"Mother and Child Reunion" was nominated for two Directors Guild of Canada Awards, winning in the "Outstanding Achievement in a Television Series – Children's" category, and picked up two Gemini Award nominations in the categories for "Best Photography in a Dramatic Program or Series" and "Best Short Dramatic Program".
