= Degrassi: The Next Generation season 1 =

Degrassi: The Next Generation
- Season 1
- Degrassi: The Next Generation Season 1 DVD
- No. of episodes: 15

Release
- Original network: CTV
- Original release: October 14, 2001 – March 3, 2002

Season chronology
- Next → Season 2

The first season of Degrassi: The Next Generation, a Canadian serial teen drama television series, commenced airing in Canada on October 14, 2001 and concluded on March 3, 2002, consisting of fifteen episodes. The series introduces a group of seventh and eighth grade school children, and follows their lives as they deal with some of the challenges and issues teenagers face such as online predators, body image, dysfunctional families, sex, puberty, rumours, peer pressure, stress, and drug use.

The first season was broadcast on the Canadian terrestrial television network CTV, on Sundays at 7:00 p.m. It debuted with a one-hour movie of the week special, "Mother and Child Reunion", which form the first two episodes of season one. In the United States, it was broadcast on the Noggin cable channel during its programming block for teenagers, The N. The season was released domestically on DVD as a three disc boxed set on October 19, 2004 by Alliance Atlantis Home Entertainment, although it was released to the US market almost a month earlier, on September 28, 2004. The season is also available on iTunes.

The reception for Degrassi: The Next Generation's first season was mixed. It had earned itself 365,000 Canadian viewers aged 18 to 49, while its accompanying website was attracting 28 million hits per month, but press reviews were not as complimentary. The season picked up nominations at the Directors Guild of Canada Awards, the Gemini Awards and the Young Artist Awards.

== Cast ==
For the new generation of students, the producers kept the same model that had been used during the casting of the previous series, Degrassi Junior High and Degrassi High and chose 11 children out of 600 auditionees, hoping to provide a group of age-appropriate actors the target audience of kids and teenagers could relate to.

=== Main cast ===
- Miriam McDonald as Emma Nelson (15 episodes)
- Aubrey Graham as Jimmy Brooks (10 episodes)
- Christina Schmidt as Terri McGreggor (13 episodes)
- Melissa McIntyre as Ashley Kerwin (13 episodes)
- Sarah Barrable-Tishauer as Liberty Van Zandt (12 episodes)
- Cassie Steele as Manuela "Manny" Santos (15 episodes)
- Stefan Brogren as Archie "Snake" Simpson (12 episodes)
- Jake Goldsbie as Toby Isaacs (15 episodes)
- Shane Kippel as Gavin "Spinner" Mason (12 episodes)
- Ryan Cooley as James Tiberius "J.T." Yorke (15 episodes)
- Lauren Collins as Paige Michalchuk (13 episodes)
- Daniel Clark as Sean Cameron (11 episodes)
- Dan Woods as Mr. Daniel Raditch (11 episodes)

=== Notable guest stars ===
Providing ties to the previous series in the Degrassi universe, Stefan Brogren, Dan Woods and Amanda Stepto were hired to reprise their original roles, being featured throughout the season while the first episode served as a reunion for many of the previous cast members of the franchise, including:

- Amanda Stepto as Christine "Spike" Nelson (6 episodes)
- Anais Granofsky as Lucy Fernandez (2 episodes)
- Stacie Mistysyn as Caitlin Ryan (2 episodes)
- Pat Mastroianni as Joey Jeremiah (2 episodes)
- Danah-Jean Brown as Trish Skye (1 episode)
- Darrin Brown as Dwayne Myers (1 episode)
- Michael Carry as Simon Dexter (1 episode)
- Irene Courakos as Alexa Pappadopoulos Dexter (1 episode)
- Chrissa Erodotou as Diana Economopoulos (1 episode)
- Rebecca Haines as Kathleen Mead (1 episode)
- Sara Holmes as Alison Hunter (1 episode)
- Neil Hope as Derek "Wheels" Wheeler (1 episode)
- Kyra Levy as Maya Goldberg (1 episode)
- Cathy Keenan as Liz O'Rourke (1 episode)
- Siluck Saysanasy as Yick Yu (1 episode)

Future series regular Andrea Lewis appears in a recurring role as Hazel Aden in 4 episodes.

Recurring Degrassi faculty characters include Linlyn Lue as Ms. Laura Kwan, and Michael Kinney as Coach Darryl Armstrong. Maria Ricossa appears as Ashley's mother Kate Kerwin, Nigel Hamer as Toby's father Jeff Isaacs, Kris Holden-Ried as Sean's brother Scott "Tracker" Cameron, and Alexa Steele as Joey's daughter Angela Jeremiah.

== Crew ==
The season was produced by Epitome Pictures and CTV. The executive producers are Epitome Pictures' CEO and Degrassi: The Next Generation co-creator Linda Schuyler, and her husband, Epitome president Stephen Stohn. Degrassi: The Next Generation co-creator Yan Moore served as the creative consultant and David Lowe was the line producer. Aaron Martin was hired as the story editor and was promoted to senior story editor mid-season. James Hurst then became the story editor. The season's writers are Tassie Cameron, Myra Fried, James Hurst, Aaron Martin, Yan Moore, and Susin Nielsen. The directors throughout the season are James Allodi, Anthony Browne, Paul Fox, Laurie Lynd, Bruce McDonald, Eleanor Lindo, and Stefan Scaini.

== Reception ==
Degrassi: The Next Generation received mixed reviews about its first season. Based on the pilot episode, Stephanie McGrath of Canoe.ca's AllPop acknowledged Miriam McDonald's portrayal of Emma Nelson as "stellar acting abilities in a super creepy storyline ... high on tension, low on cheese [and] top-notch". She criticized the reunion sub-plot, though, saying it was marred by "wooden, stilted and over-rehearsed acting; the young actors actually showed up their classic Degrassi counter-parts in the pilot episode. Their acting was solid, believable and age-appropriate [in a story-line which] demonstrates that the creative forces behind The Next Generation haven't lost touch with teens yet ... One installment of Degrassi: The Next Generation is worth 20 episodes of Dawson's Creek". Towards the end of the season, the Canadian issue of TV Guide summed up the run as "Not just Canadian TV – It's great Canadian TV! Degrassi offers a gritty look into the lives of real teens complete with acne and bad dye jobs. It has something for everyone because we've all been there."

Other critics were less enthusiastic about the season, though. The Seattle Times' Melanie McFarland was unsure whether the series' success in Canada would follow when it began airing in the US. "As popular as 'Degrassi' was, it was still a mere cult hit in the United States; the crowd that had access to it initially on PBS might not be able to tune into Noggin. Soft-pedaling through the issues might work for today's family of viewers, but what's gentle enough for Mom and Dad's peace of mind might not be enough to hook Junior or the original Degrassi's older fans". She was, however, "happy Noggin chose Degrassi students to navigate teen perils instead of digging up Screech and the gang for another nauseating go-round". Tony Atherton of the Ottawa Citizen had mixed feelings of the new incarnation, saying it "has a cleaner, more polished look, has lost its edge [and offers] nothing new to viewers familiar with the groundbreaking preceding series, nor to anyone else who has watched the deluge of teen dramas since", adding that because there is "little ground left to break in teen drama there is a sense of déjà vu with regards to the plots and characters". He did, however, praise the show for having "the same simple narrative told from a kid's viewpoint, and the same regard for unvarnished reality [as Degrassi Junior High and Degrassi High, making it] light years from far-fetched high-school melodramas like Boston Public and Dawson's Creek [and for that] is every bit as good as its beloved predecessor. In fact, in some respects it is even better". After watching nearly seventy hours of twenty-one Canadian-produced programs, the Simon Fraser University cited Degrassi: The Next Generation in their report as one of the Canadian television programmes that is "too Caucasian".

Despite the mixed reviews and controversy over the storylines, the first season was still watched by 365,000 18- to 49-year-old Canadians, making it Canada's top-rated domestic drama at the time, while its accompanying website was attracting 28 million hits per month.

The pilot was nominated for two Directors Guild of Canada Awards, winning in the "Outstanding Achievement in a Television Series – Children's" category, and picked up Gemini Award nominations in the categories for "Best Photography in a Dramatic Program or Series" and "Best Short Dramatic Program". Actors Jake Goldsbie and Ryan Cooley were nominated for their portrayals of Toby Isaacs and J.T. Yorke respectively at the Young Artist Awards. Five episodes were given a total of six awards by The National Council on Family Relations at its 34th Annual Awards ceremony.

== Episodes ==
In the United States, the third episode "Family Politics" was aired on Noggin's "The N" block as the series premiere; "Mother and Child Reunion" was held back and aired as the season finale. This caused continuity problems for viewers as the episode depicted Toby being introduced to Manny and Emma for the first time, and was set before the school year began. The final episode of the season, "Jagged Little Pill", was also held back while The N decided whether its subject about ecstasy abuse was too controversial. When an edited version was made available, The N aired it as part of season two. In reruns however, the episodes have aired in the original order intended by the show's producers. Most of the episodes are named after songs and films from the 1950s, 70s, 80s and 90s.

This list is by order of production, as they appear on the DVD.

No. overall	No. in season	Title	Original release date	Prod. code
1 2	1 2	"Mother and Child Reunion"	October 14, 2001	101 & 102
Spike Nelson's 12 year old daughter Emma has spent the year communicating with her boyfriend "Jordan" over the internet and finally makes plans to meet him in person, even though her friends warn her about the potential dangers in doing so. Degrassi High's classes of 1992 and 1993 return for their high school reunion. Recently widowed, Joey is unsure if he even wants to go, especially after finding out that his ex-girlfriend Caitlin is bringing her fiancée Keith to the event. First appearances of Emma Nelson (as played by Miriam McDonald), Manny Santos (Cassie Steele), Toby Issacs (Jake Goldsbie), J.T Yorke (Ryan Cooley), Terri McGreggor (Christina Schmidt) and Ashley Kerwin (Melissa McIntyre).
3	3	"Family Politics"	November 4, 2001	103
It's the first day of school at Degrassi Community School, and eighth-grader Ashley already has her sights set on becoming the school's newest student council president. Her seemingly sure win is soon threatened when her stepbrother, Toby, becomes frustrated by her unchallenged status and convinces his friend J.T. to run against her. Meanwhile, Emma and Manny deal with eighth-grader Spinner's bullying. First appearances of Jimmy Brooks (Aubrey Graham), Liberty Van Zandt (Sarah Barrable-Tishauer), Spinner Mason (Shane Kippel) and Paige Michalchuk (Lauren Collins).
4	4	"Eye of the Beholder"	November 11, 2001	104
Terri doesn't want to attend Degrassi's first nighttime dance because she thinks she's too fat for any guy to like her. Spinner likes her, but Paige wants him for herself and, by playing on her insecurities, gets Terri drunk before her date with Spinner. Meanwhile, Emma is puzzled by the new kid's behavior and J.T. and Toby skip the dance to look at Internet pornography. First appearance of Sean Cameron (Daniel Clark).
5	5	"Parents' Day"	November 18, 2001	105
With Parents' Day fast approaching, Toby tries to convince his divorced parents that the event is canceled in order to avoid an ugly, public spat between them. Meanwhile, Ashley and Paige vie for the attention of Toby's mom, who happens to be a casting agent. Emma is annoyed by the NAK (News About Kids) morning-announcements program, believing it to be biased. She then writes an opinionated paper about NAK, and gets into an argument with Sean and his brother about it.
6	6	"The Mating Game"	November 25, 2001	106
Jimmy and Ashley's eight-month anniversary comes up but with Paige playing Juliet to Jimmy's Romeo for their English class assignment, Ashley contemplates having sex with him to keep him interested. Meanwhile, Toby attempts to get closer to Emma when the seventh-graders are given an assignment on endangered animals.
7	7	"Basketball Diaries"	December 2, 2001	107
Jimmy wants to make the basketball team, but due to practice, his schoolwork suffers. To get an energy boost, he convinces Spinner to skip a Ritalin pill and give it to him instead, resulting in Spinner, off his medication, mooning the audience during halftime. Jimmy, under the influence of the Ritalin, gets himself into trouble when he hurts Sean in attempt to take the winning shot. Meanwhile, Liberty is tired of writing Ashley's video announcement speeches and not getting any credit for it. Ashley then gives her a chance at doing the announcements, with disastrous results.
8	8	"Secrets & Lies"	December 9, 2001	108
Ashley's dad is coming home from Europe, and she's happy, until she finds out he's gay and cuts him out of her life. Meanwhile, Liberty has the biggest crush on J.T., but he's not interested. When he hears about Ashley's father, he tells Liberty he, too, is a homosexual.
9	9	"Coming of Age"	December 16, 2001	109
With his parents working constantly, Jimmy starts to spend all his time at Ashley's, which leaves her feeling smothered. Meanwhile, Emma learns her mood swings are not just because of stress when she gets her first period.
10	10	"Rumours and Reputations"	January 6, 2002	110
Emma accidentally starts a hurtful rumor about Liberty dating Mr. Armstrong, when in fact she is getting extra tutoring with him for her dyscalculia. Meanwhile, Spinner finds a bug in his school lunch, but no one will believe his story. Determined to prove himself right, he puts bugs in Ashley's food, and is forced to take a job in the school's cafeteria as punishment. First appearance of Hazel Aden (Andrea Lewis), who is recurring initially and would later be made a series regular.
11	11	"Friday Night"	January 27, 2002	111
Sean asks Emma out on a date, but the night turns into one disaster after another. Meanwhile, when Jimmy and Spinner are given detention by a stressed Ms. Kwan, they vow revenge by pulling pranks on her. The pranks are fun at first, but quickly turn cruel when Spinner decides to egg Ms. Kwan's car.
12	12	"Wannabe"	February 3, 2002	112
Paige starts a Spirit Squad at school. Manny, who desperately wants to join, starts to hang out with the "it crowd," and begins to question her friendship with an unsupportive Emma. Meanwhile, Spinner, Liberty, J.T., and Toby team up to win a contest.
13	13	"Cabaret"	February 17, 2002	113
Ashley writes a song she plans to perform with Terri at the Degrassi Lunchtime Cabaret, but when Terri adds Paige, she grows annoyed when Paige takes control. Terri attempts to use her recent project on tarot card readings to convince Ashley to go with Paige's ideas, but Ashley refuses, upsetting Terri and Paige. Meanwhile, Emma performs an interpretive dance to advocate anti-poaching, and when Sean refuses to join, Toby steps up.
14	14	"Under Pressure"	February 24, 2002	114
With exams approaching at Degrassi, the last thing Sean wants is to repeat Grade 7 for a second time. When he doesn't finish his Media Immersions exam on time, he is convinced he has failed again. Stressed to a boiling point, Sean releases his frustrations in a violent way. Meanwhile, Spinner attempts to get sick to avoid taking his English exam, but ultimately gets help from an unlikely source.
15	15	"Jagged Little Pill"	March 3, 2002	115
Ashley is tired of being a perfectionist and turns her end-of-the-year slumber party into an out-of-control rager. Meanwhile, J.T. brings an ecstasy pill for Toby, Sean, and himself, but when Ashley consumes it, things go from bad to worse. Also, Sean wants to make up with Emma, but Emma is still angry at Sean for his actions in the previous episode.

== DVD release ==
The DVD release of season one was released by FUNimation Entertainment in the U.S. on 28 September 2004, and by Alliance Atlantis Home Entertainment in Canada on 19 October 2004 after it had completed broadcast on television. As well as every episode from the season, the DVD release features bonus material including deleted scenes, bloopers and behind-the-scenes featurettes.

The DVD was first released in Australia on May 3, 2007, by Roadshow Entertainment, without any bonus features. On September 8, 2010, the DVD was re-released along with season two by Shock Entertainment with all of the bonus features intact. Season one is currently being released by Umbrella Entertainment.

The Complete First Season
Set details			Special features
15 director's cut episodes; 450 minutes; 3-disc set; 1.33:1 aspect ratio; Languages: English (Dolby Digital 5.1)			Degrassi karaoke; Degrassi photo album; Character descriptions; Cast biographies; Deleted scenes; Oops and bloopers; Original television promos; Audition tapes
Release dates			Degrassi karaoke; Degrassi photo album; Character descriptions; Cast biographies; Deleted scenes; Oops and bloopers; Original television promos; Audition tapes
Canada	United States	(Australia) Region 4	Degrassi karaoke; Degrassi photo album; Character descriptions; Cast biographies; Deleted scenes; Oops and bloopers; Original television promos; Audition tapes
19 October 2004	28 September 2004	3 May 2007; 8 September 2010 (re-release)	Degrassi karaoke; Degrassi photo album; Character descriptions; Cast biographies; Deleted scenes; Oops and bloopers; Original television promos; Audition tapes

== Notes ==
- Ellis, Kathryn (September 2005). Degrassi: Generations – The Official 411. New York, New York: Pocket Books. ISBN 978-1-4165-1680-4.
