= Degrassi: The Next Generation season 3 =

Degrassi: The Next Generation
- Season 3
- Degrassi: The Next Generation Season 3 DVD
- No. of episodes: 22

Release
- Original network: CTV
- Original release: September 17, 2003 – April 5, 2004

Season chronology
- ← Previous; Season 2 Next → Season 4

The third season of Degrassi: The Next Generation, a Canadian serial teen drama television series, commenced airing in Canada on September 17, 2003 and concluded on April 5, 2004, consisting of twenty-two episodes. This season depicts the lives of a group of high school freshmen and sophomores as they deal with some of the challenges and issues teenagers face such as dysfunctional families, sex, homosexuality, homophobia, theft, self-harm, domestic violence, abortion, emancipation and relationships.

Every episode is named after a song from the 1980s. Filming began on May 26, 2003, and ended in November 2003.

The third season aired Wednesdays at 8:30 p.m. on CTV, a Canadian terrestrial television network, and premiered with a sixty-minute special, "Father Figure", which form the first two episodes of the season. When the season returned to the schedules in January 2004 following a break over the Christmas period, it aired on Mondays at 8:30 p.m. In the United States, it was broadcast on the Noggin cable channel during its programming block for teenagers, The N. The season was released on DVD as a three disc boxed set on March 28, 2006 by Alliance Atlantis Home Entertainment in Canada, and by FUNimation Entertainment in the US. The show is also available on iTunes.

The season was watched by 669,000 viewers in Canada and became the most-watched domestic drama series, while in the US it averaged 250,000 viewers an episode. It won a total of five awards from the Directors Guild of Canada Awards, the Gemini Awards and the Young Artist Awards, and was described as "groundbreaking", "bold", and the show others in the same genre "should take a cue from", although that groundbreaking boldness caused two episodes of the season to be banned from US television screens for three years and when it was finally aired, it was rated "TV-14," even though more intense episodes still received Degrassi's usual "TV-PG" in the United States.

== Cast ==
The third season features twenty actors who receive star billing. Fifteen cast members return from the previous season, with Stacey Farber (Ellie), Andrea Lewis (Hazel), Amanda Stepto (Spike), Stacie Mistysyn (Caitlin) and Adamo Ruggiero (Marco) joining the main cast.

=== Main cast ===
- Stacey Farber as Ellie Nash (13 episodes)
- Miriam McDonald as Emma Nelson (15 episodes)
- Aubrey Graham as Jimmy Brooks (17 episodes)
- Shane Kippel as Gavin "Spinner" Mason (20 episodes)
- Andrea Lewis as Hazel Aden (15 episodes)
- Cassie Steele as Manuela "Manny" Santos (15 episodes)
- Lauren Collins as Paige Michalchuk (19 episodes)
- Christina Schmidt as Terri McGreggor (7 episodes)
- Ryan Cooley as James Tiberius "J.T." Yorke (14 episodes)
- Melissa McIntyre as Ashley Kerwin (15 episodes)
- Jake Epstein as Craig Manning (17 episodes)
- Jake Goldsbie as Toby Isaacs (12 episodes)
- Sarah Barrable-Tishauer as Liberty Van Zandt (13 episodes)
- Amanda Stepto as Christine "Spike" Nelson (11 episodes)
- Stefan Brogren as Archie "Snake" Simpson (15 episodes)
- Pat Mastroianni as Joey Jeremiah (11 episodes)
- Stacie Mistysyn as Caitlin Ryan (8 episodes)
- Daniel Clark as Sean Cameron (11 episodes)
- Dan Woods as Mr. Raditch (11 episodes)
- Adamo Ruggiero as Marco Del Rossi (15 episodes)

=== Recurring cast ===
The following cast members appear in recurring roles, and would be promoted to the main cast in subsequent seasons:

- Melissa DiMarco as Daphne Hatzilakos (8 episodes)
- Mike Lobel as Jay Hogart (8 episodes)
- Deanna Casaluce as Alex Nuñez (5 episodes)

Other recurring cast members include Michael Kinney as Coach Darryl Armstrong, Katie Lai as Kendra Mason, Linlyn Lue as Ms. Laura Kwan, Daniel Morrison as Chris Sharpe, Alexa Steele as Angela Jeremiah, John Bregar as Dylan Michalchuk, Travis Donegan as Towerz and Ephraim Ellis as Rick Murray.

Degrassi High's Cathy Keenan, Angela Deiseach and Maureen Deiseach reprise their roles as Liz O'Rourke, Erica Farrell and Heather Farrell for the opening episode, "Father Figure". The character of Shane McKay was recast with Jonathan Torrens rather than the original actor Bill Parrott. Neil Hope returns as Wheels in the seventh episode, "Should I Stay or Should I Go?".

== Crew ==
The season was produced by Epitome Pictures in association CTV. Funding was provided by The Canadian Film or Video Production Tax Credit and the Ontario Film and Television Tax Credit, the Canadian Television Fund and BCE-CTV Benefits, The Shaw Television Broadcast Fund, the Independent Production Fund, Mountain Cable Program, and RBC Royal Bank.

The executive producers are Epitome Pictures' CEO and Degrassi: The Next Generation co-creator Linda Schuyler, and her husband, Epitome president Stephen Stohn. Degrassi: The Next Generation co-creator Yan Moore served as the creative consultant and David Lowe is the line producer. Aaron Martin is the executive story editor. At the beginning of the season James Hurst served as the story editor, with Shelley Scarrow as junior story editor; by the end of the season they had been promoted to senior story editor and story editor, respectively. Brandon Yorke also served as a story editor, and Nicole Demerse became a story editor midway through the season. The editor is Stephen Withrow, Stephen Stanley is the production designer, and the cinematographers are Gavin Smith, David Perrauit, and Phil Earnshaw.

The writers for the season are Christine Alexiou, Tassie Cameron, Sean Carley, Craig Cornell, Nicole Demerse, James Hurst, Sean Jara, Aaron Martin, Yan Moore, Shelley Scarrow, Rebecca Schechter, Jana Sinyor, and Brendon Yorke. John Bell, Phil Earnshaw, Allan Eastman, Eleanore Lindo, Bruce McDonald, Andrew Potter, and Stefan Scaini directed the episodes.

When production of season three began, someone with the username "ExecProducer" started a thread on the official Degrassi: The Next Generation website, revealing production details, guest actors, scheduling information and DVD release details. He actually referred to himself as "Stephen Stohn" in one post, although this was not officially confirmed until the release of Degrassi: Generations – The Official 411 guidebook in 2005, when Stohn confirmed it was him.

== Reception ==
In Canada the third season of Degrassi: The Next Generation was the most-watched domestic drama amongst adults 18 to 49, and the most-watched domestic drama series overall. It received an average of 669,000 viewers, an increase of 44% compared to season two. In the US, the season averaged 250,000 viewers.

Following season finale, the San Jose Mercury News said "If they [Everwood, The O.C., and One Tree Hill] want to be taken seriously, the shows could take a cue from Canadian drama Degrassi: The Next Generation, which ... addresses the same gritty teen issues without being far-fetched", and Tim Goodman of the San Francisco Chronicle echoed that by adding "Degrassi: The Next Generation has cultivated a loyal audience by avoiding the sugar-coating niceties of old-school teen TV and by treating those 10- to 14-year-olds as, well, not adults per se, but definitely maturing viewers. Degrassi focuses on a high school with a disparate student body, with countless individual stories to tell (which is why the franchise has lasted this long). There's nothing corny or sweet about "Degrassi" as it boldly tackles everything from obesity to date rape, thongs to drugs". Others, such as The Advocate gave praise and said the series was breaking new ground by depicting a gay romance between two teenaged boys.

Two of the episodes of season three were considered "too honest" for US viewers, as they portrayed a fourteen-year-old girl having an abortion, and having no regrets later, and The N refused to air the episodes. On the decision, The N said, "It's a serious episode and the summer [schedule] is all lighthearted", but "unrelated to any policy position regarding abortion." The refusal caused an uproar amongst the show's US fans, over 6000 of whom signed a petition calling the decision "unjust and asinine", and even attracted the attention of newspapers and media in Canada and the US, with The New York Times reporting on the portrayal of abortion on television.

The season won a total of five awards and six more nominations from various bodies. At the 2004 Directors Guild of Canada Awards, "Holiday" won "Outstanding Achievement in a Television Series – Family" and garnered a nomination for Stephen Stanley for "Outstanding Achievement in Production Design – Television Series". "Pride" won Aaron Martin, James Hurst and Shelley Scarrow the award for "Best Youth Script" at the Canadian Screenwriting Awards, given out annually by the Writers Guild of Canada, and "Best Direction in a Children's or Youths' Program or Series" at the Gemini Awards. The series also won the Gemini for "Best Children's or Youth Fiction Program or Series". Jake Epstein was nominated for "Best Performance in a Children's or Youth Program or Series" for his acting in "Should I Stay or Should I Go?", and Shelley Scarrow, Nicole Demerse and James Hurst were nominated for "Best Writing for a Children's or Youth Program or Series" for "Accidents Will Happen". The series received a nomination for "Outstanding Drama Series" at the 15th GLAAD Media Awards, which honor the media for their portrayal of the LGBT community and the issues that affect their lives. Jake Epstein was nominated for "Best Performance in a TV Comedy Series Leading Young Actor" at the Young Artist Awards, Alex Steele was nominated for "Best Performance in a TV Comedy Series Young Actress Age Ten or Younger", and the show won "Best Family TV Series (Comedy or Drama)".

== Episodes ==
In the United States, Noggin's The N block aired season three in two separate runs as it had done with the second season. The first wave of episodes aired between October 3, 2003 and December 19, 2003, and the second wave from June 4, 2004 to August 6, 2004. Episodes fourteen and fifteen, the "banned" episodes, were finally broadcast on August 26, 2006, three years after their original Canadian broadcast during an "Every Degrassi Episode Ever" Marathon.

In Canada, episode 313 "This Charming Man" aired before the Christmas-themed episode 311/312 "Holiday".

This list is by order of production, as they appear on the DVD.

No. overall	No. in season	Title	Directed by	Written by	Canada airdate	U.S. airdate	Prod. code
38–39	1–2	"Father Figure"	Bruce McDonald	Story by : Aaron Martin & Yan Moore; Teleplay by : James Hurst	September 17, 2003	October 3, 2003 (The N)	301 & 302
The Simpson-Nelson household prepares for the arrival of the new baby when Spike announces that she wants to have a home birth. On the first day of the new school year, Emma becomes irritated that people keep mistaking her as Snake's daughter, so she decides to ditch school with Craig and find her real father, Shane McKay. When she does ultimately find him, she is not prepared for what she sees. Meanwhile, Spinner is having a hard time finding the "perfect" gift for Paige and decides to get her a new locker. He starts a chain of locker swapping, which lands him in trouble with both Paige and Mr. Raditch.
40	3	"U Got the Look"	Stefan Scaini	Story by : Jana Sinyor & Brendon Yorke; Teleplay by : Jana Sinyor	October 1, 2003	October 10, 2003 (The N)	303
Sick of being perceived as "cute" and "adorable", Manny changes her image to "hot", which catches all the boys' attention but also creates problems between her, Emma and J.T., who begins crushing on her. Meanwhile, Joey becomes too involved with Craig's new band, which does not sit well with everyone.
41	4	"Pride: Part 1"	Phil Earnshaw	Story by : Aaron Martin & James Hurst & Shelley Scarrow; Teleplay by : Aaron Martin	October 8, 2003	October 17, 2003 (The N)	304
The skeletons in Marco's closet are brought to the forefront when Ellie refuses to pretend to be his girlfriend any longer and he soon falls for Paige's gay brother, Dylan. Spinner's vocal homophobia only makes it worse. Meanwhile, Snake suddenly develops a mysterious illness that causes spontaneous bleeding and dizziness. Note: This episode marks the first appearance of Mike Lobel as Jay Hogart.
42	5	"Pride: Part 2"	Phil Earnshaw	Story by : Aaron Martin & James Hurst & Shelley Scarrow; Teleplay by : Aaron Martin	October 15, 2003	October 17, 2003 (The N)	305
Spinner tries to cut Marco out of his life after he learns that he is gay, and Marco wonders if he should keep it a secret from everyone else until an encounter with a group of guys shows him who his real friends are. Meanwhile, Snake gets sicker and finds out he has leukemia.
43	6	"Gangsta Gangsta"	Allan Eastman	Story by : Sean Jara & Rebecca Schechter; Teleplay by : Sean Jara	October 22, 2003	October 24, 2003 (The N)	306
Sean starts hanging out with the bad kids at school, which causes problems between him and Emma. Meanwhile, J.T. has been spending more time with Paige and the popular kids, leaving Toby behind. Note: This episode marks the first appearance of Deanna Casaluce as Alex Nuñez.
44	7	"Should I Stay or Should I Go?"	Stefan Scaini	Story by : Aaron Martin & Shelley Scarrow; Teleplay by : Shelley Scarrow	October 29, 2003	October 31, 2003 (The N)	307
Things are getting intense between Craig and Ashley when sex becomes a desire. When she tells him she loves him, Craig has a hard time saying it back and writes her a song instead. Manny becomes smitten with Craig after hearing the song, and winds up consoling him after he has a fight with Ashley. Meanwhile, Joey takes a sick Snake out to go bowling, when they receive a surprise visit from an old friend.
45	8	"Whisper to a Scream"	Phil Earnshaw	Story by : James Hurst & Rebecca Schechter; Teleplay by : Tassie Cameron	November 5, 2003	November 28, 2003 (The N)	308
Ellie is under a lot of pressure. Her dad is fighting overseas, her mother has started drinking again, and she is given a chance to work for Caitlin. The stress causes Ellie to start cutting herself, but through her pain, she gets help from an unlikely source. Meanwhile, Terri receives roses from a secret admirer and worries that it may be Toby, whose behavior makes her very uneasy.
46	9	"Against All Odds"	Stefan Scaini	Story by : Aaron Martin & Craig Cornell; Teleplay by : James Hurst	November 12, 2003	December 5, 2003 (The N)	309
With Sean and Emma having officially broken up, the latter sets her sights on the new kid, Chris Sharpe, while Manny tries to get Craig's attention. A trip to a rave eventually leads to a falling out between the longtime best friends. Meanwhile, Spinner is still a bit uneasy to be around Marco when he begins to think Marco has a crush on him.
47	10	"Never Gonna Give You Up"	John Bell	Story by : Yan Moore & Craig Cornell; Teleplay by : James Hurst	November 19, 2003	December 12, 2003 (The N)	310
While Terri is happy to have a new boyfriend in her life, Hazel and Paige become suspicious when she comes to school with cuts and bruises. Meanwhile, a rivalry develops between Spinner and J.T. after the latter continually hangs out with Paige.
48–49	11–12	"Holiday"	Phil Earnshaw	Story by : James Hurst & Shelley Scarrow; Teleplay by : Aaron Martin	December 17, 2003	December 19, 2003 (The N)	311/312
With Christmas rapidly approaching, Craig finds himself slowly losing interest in Ashley while continuing to cheat on her with Manny, who soon has become a comfort for him. Craig doesn't know whom he wants to be with more and continues to see them both behind each other's back, while also accepting the risk of losing both of them. Meanwhile, Joey and Sydney find themselves getting increasingly serious, but Sydney's jealousy comes out when Joey begins spending a lot of time with Caitlin, who begins to develop feelings for him.
50	13	"This Charming Man"	Stefan Scaini	Story by : Aaron Martin & Nicole Demerse; Teleplay by : Jana Sinyor	December 10, 2003	June 4, 2004 (The N)	313
Chris and Emma finally become a couple, but when she thinks Sean and his friends are stealing things at and near Degrassi, Emma becomes obsessed with bringing them to justice. Meanwhile, Paige, Spinner, and Jimmy enroll in Driver Ed, and Paige develops a crush on their instructor, Mr. Falcone, making Spinner jealous.
51	14	"Accidents Will Happen" Part One	Eleanore Lindo	Story by : James Hurst & Nicole Demerse; Teleplay by : Shelley Scarrow	January 26, 2004	August 26, 2006 (The N)	314
Manny worries that she might be pregnant with Craig's child after missing a period and having morning sickness. Meanwhile, Toby tries to join J.T. in the "in crowd" by promising Jimmy that he can hack into the school's database and change his low math grade.
52	15	"Accidents Will Happen" Part Two	Eleanore Lindo	Story by : James Hurst & Nicole Demerse; Teleplay by : Shelley Scarrow	February 9, 2004	August 26, 2006 (The N)	315
Manny and Craig decide to raise their baby, but when they fail miserably at taking care of Spike and Snake's baby, Manny realizes she's not ready to be a mother at her age and considers having an abortion, which upsets both Craig and Emma. Meanwhile, after Sean tells Liberty to get over J.T., she sets her sights on him. Sean hurts her feelings, but makes it up to Liberty by setting her up with one of his friends.
53	16	"Take on Me"	Phil Earnshaw	Story by : Sean Carley & Aaron Martin; Teleplay by : Sean Carley	February 16, 2004	June 11, 2004 (The N)	316
In this homage to The Breakfast Club, Hazel, Ellie, Jimmy, Toby and Sean are stuck in Mr. Raditch's Saturday detention block, and despite being in different cliques, they begin to bond.
54	17	"Don't Dream It's Over"	Allan Eastman	Story by : Aaron Martin & Christine Alexiou; Teleplay by : Rebecca Schechter	February 23, 2004	June 18, 2004 (The N)	317
Paige plans a weekend road trip with Spinner, Jimmy and Hazel, who wants Terri to join them. Terri doesn't want to feel like a fifth wheel, so Paige suggests she bring someone. When Terri shows up at The Dot with Rick, her abusive ex, everyone is shocked and angered. At the park, Paige and Rick get into a fight, and when Terri is forced to choose between them, the result is tragic. Meanwhile, Ellie doesn't like how Sean treats Marco when they hang out together. Ellie nearly jeopardizes her first relationship, but Marco tells her that Sean could be great for her, if she lets him.
55	18	"Rock & Roll High School"	Stefan Scaini	Story by : James Hurst & Rebecca Schechter; Teleplay by : Brendon Yorke	March 8, 2004	July 2, 2004 (The N)	318
Craig's band, Downtown Sasquatch, goes up against Ashley's, Hell Hath No Fury, for a chance to win a recording session. The battle of the bands quickly turns personal when Ashley writes an angry song about how Craig broke her heart. Meanwhile, Caitlin gets a crash course in parenting when she must care for Joey and Angie after he injures his back, with Angie constantly giving her a hard time. Special guest star: Chris Woodward.
56	19	"It's Raining Men"	Andrew Potter	Story by : James Hurst & Aaron Martin; Teleplay by : James Hurst	March 15, 2004	July 9, 2004 (The N)	319
Marco is prepared to go on his first date since coming out of the closet and sets his sights on Dylan. Nervous about the evening, he turns to Spinner for help. Meanwhile, J.T. hosts a party after he stars in a commercial for french fries. However, the feedback is less than stellar due to the rather cheesy nature of it.
57	20	"I Want Candy"	Stefan Scaini	Story by : Aaron Martin & Shelley Scarrow; Teleplay by : Aaron Martin	March 22, 2004	July 16, 2004 (The N)	320
Paige and Spinner decide to skip school for a day of fun before their final exams and invite Ashley, who is still depressed over her breakup with Craig. They are in for a surprise when Ashley says she may leave Degrassi. Meanwhile, Emma finds Snake's will and panics, fearing that the chemotherapy failed. Note: This episode marks the last appearance of Christina Schmidt as Terri McGreggor.
58	21	"Our House"	Allan Eastman	Story by : Yan Moore & Aaron Martin; Teleplay by : Yan Moore	March 29, 2004	July 30, 2004 (The N)	321
Sean's brother gets a job in Alberta, but Sean wants to stay at Degrassi. He finds out that he can live by himself with student welfare, but that plan is in jeopardy when his place becomes party central. Meanwhile, Liberty makes it her mission to get J.T. his dream date to the semiformal, even if it's not her.
59	22	"The Power of Love"	Stefan Scaini	Story by : Aaron Martin & Shelley Scarrow; Teleplay by : Aaron Martin	April 5, 2004	August 6, 2004 (The N)	322
It's the end-of-the-year dance at Degrassi, and Jimmy wants it to be perfect for his date and their friends, but one misfortune after another plagues the evening. Meanwhile, feeling guilty for stealing Snake's laptop, Sean decides to come clean to him, but he soon realizes that getting Mr. Simpson's forgiveness is not going to be easy. Also, Joey asks Caitlin to move in with him, but she is soon offered a job in Los Angeles. Special guest star: Billy Ray Cyrus as the limo driver.

== DVD release ==
The DVD release of season three was released by Alliance Atlantis Home Entertainment in Canada, and by FUNimation Entertainment in the US on 28 March 2006 after it had completed broadcast on television. It was released in Australia by Shock Records on 13 April 2011. As well as every episode from the season, the DVD release features bonus material including Audio commentaries, deleted scenes, and bloopers.

The Complete Third Season
Set details		Special features
22 director's cut episodes; 3-disc set; 1.33:1 aspect ratio; Languages: English (Dolby Digital 5.1)		Audio commentaries: "Accidents Will Happen"; "Pride"; Deleted Moments; Rock and Roll High School Karaoke; "I'm in Love"; "Spinner's Rap"; "Mr. Nice Guy"; "What I Know"; Season 3 interactive quiz; CTV Degrassi promo; Degrassi yearbook; Character and cast biographies
Release dates		Audio commentaries: "Accidents Will Happen"; "Pride"; Deleted Moments; Rock and Roll High School Karaoke; "I'm in Love"; "Spinner's Rap"; "Mr. Nice Guy"; "What I Know"; Season 3 interactive quiz; CTV Degrassi promo; Degrassi yearbook; Character and cast biographies
(Canada) (United States) Region 1	(Australia) Region 4	Audio commentaries: "Accidents Will Happen"; "Pride"; Deleted Moments; Rock and Roll High School Karaoke; "I'm in Love"; "Spinner's Rap"; "Mr. Nice Guy"; "What I Know"; Season 3 interactive quiz; CTV Degrassi promo; Degrassi yearbook; Character and cast biographies
28 March 2006	13 April 2011	Audio commentaries: "Accidents Will Happen"; "Pride"; Deleted Moments; Rock and Roll High School Karaoke; "I'm in Love"; "Spinner's Rap"; "Mr. Nice Guy"; "What I Know"; Season 3 interactive quiz; CTV Degrassi promo; Degrassi yearbook; Character and cast biographies

== Notes ==
- Ellis, Kathryn (September 2005). Degrassi: Generations – The Official 411. New York, New York: Pocket Books. ISBN 978-1-4165-1680-4.
