= Degrassi: The Next Generation season 2 =

Season of television series

Degrassi: The Next Generation
- Season 2
- Degrassi: The Next Generation Season 2 DVD
- No. of episodes: 22

Release
- Original network: CTV
- Original release: September 29, 2002 – February 23, 2003

Season chronology
- ← Previous; Season 1 Next → Season 3

The second season of Degrassi: The Next Generation, a Canadian serial teen drama television series, commenced airing in Canada on September 29, 2002 and concluded on February 29, 2003, consisting of twenty-two episodes. This season depicts the lives of a group of eighth and ninth grade school children as they deal with some of the challenges and issues teenagers face such as child abuse, hormones, date rape, body image, hate crimes, sexual identity, alcoholism, and protests. This is the first season to feature high school students from grade nine and the last season to feature middle school students.

Filming began June 10, 2002, and continued into November 2002.

The second season aired Sundays at 7:00 p.m. on CTV, a Canadian terrestrial television network, and premiered with a sixty-minute special, "When Doves Cry", which form the first two episodes of season two. Additional episodes were also aired on Fridays during January 2003. In the United States, it was broadcast on the Noggin cable channel during its programming block for teenagers, The N. The season was released on DVD as a four disc boxed set on June 21, 2005 by Alliance Atlantis Home Entertainment in Canada, and by Funimation in the US. It is purchasable on iTunes.

A critical and popular success, the second season of Degrassi: The Next Generation was the most-watched Canadian drama series for Canada's younger viewers aged two to thirty-four. It was nominated in eight categories at the Gemini Awards, four categories at the Directors Guild of Canada Awards and the National Council on Family Relations Media Awards, and in two categories at the Young Artist Awards. Four episodes were also nominated at the Awards of Excellence Gala, hosted by the Alliance for Children and Television, what recognize quality Canadian children's programming.

== Cast ==
All thirteen cast members from the first season return this season, joined by new cast members Pat Mastroianni (Joey Jeremiah) and Jake Epstein (Craig).

=== Main cast ===
- Miriam McDonald as Emma Nelson (18 episodes)
- Aubrey Graham as Jimmy Brooks (18 episodes)
- Christina Schmidt as Terri McGreggor (14 episodes)
- Melissa McIntyre as Ashley Kerwin (18 episodes)
- Sarah Barrable-Tishauer as Liberty Van Zandt (14 episodes)
- Cassie Steele as Manuela "Manny" Santos (19 episodes)
- Stefan Brogren as Archie "Snake" Simpson (17 episodes)
- Jake Goldsbie as Toby Isaacs (18 episodes)
- Shane Kippel as Gavin "Spinner" Mason (20 episodes)
- Ryan Cooley as James Tiberius "J.T." Yorke (20 episodes)
- Lauren Collins as Paige Michalchuk (18 episodes)
- Pat Mastroianni as Joey Jeremiah (10 episodes)
- Jake Epstein as Craig Manning (15 episodes)
- Daniel Clark as Sean Cameron (19 episodes)
- Dan Woods as Mr. Daniel Raditch (19 episodes)

=== Recurring cast ===
The following cast members appear in recurring roles, and would be promoted to the main cast in subsequent seasons:

- Andrea Lewis as Hazel Aden (20 episodes)
- Adamo Ruggiero as Marco Del Rossi (18 episodes)
- Stacey Farber as Ellie Nash (17 episodes)
- Melissa DiMarco as Daphne Hatzilakos (7 episodes)
- Amanda Stepto as Christine "Spike" Nelson (6 episodes)
- Stacie Mistysyn as Caitlin Ryan (3 episodes)

Other recurring cast members include Katie Lai as Spinner's sister Kendra Mason, Linlyn Lue as Ms. Laura Kwan, Michael Kinney as Coach Darryl Armstrong and Alexa Steele as Angela Jeremiah.

Degrassi Junior High's Siluck Saysanasy reprises his role as Yick Yu in a cameo in "When Doves Cry", while Anais Granofsky returns as Lucy Fernandez in "White Wedding".

== Crew ==
The season was produced by Epitome Pictures and CTV. The executive producers are Epitome Pictures' CEO and Degrassi: The Next Generation co-creator Linda Schuyler, and her husband, Epitome president Stephen Stohn. Degrassi: The Next Generation co-creator Yan Moore served as the creative consultant and David Lowe was the line producer. Aaron Martin served as the executive story editor. James Hurst served as the story editor, with Shelley Scarrow as the junior story editor. The writers for the season are Tassie Cameron, Craig Cornell, James Hurst, Sean Jara, Aaron Martin, Yan Moore, Susin Nielsen, Clare Ross Dunn, Shelley Scarrow, Jana Sinyor, David Sutherland, and Brendon Yorke. The season's directors are Bruce McDonald, Philip Earnshaw, Paul Fox, Anais Granofsky, and Stefan Scaini.

== Reception ==
Well received by critics and audience alike, Degrassi: The Next Generation's second season became the most-watched domestic drama series for Canada's three younger age groups of children aged two to eleven, teenagers aged twelve to seventeen and adults aged eighteen to thirty-four.

The season was not without controversy, however. There are a number of episodes with scenes of one teenager being beaten by his father. When reviewing those episodes, the Ryerson University of Toronto said the show "stands on its own" in reflecting "the kinds of issues [teenagers are] facing in their own lives ... handled with care and consideration, without all the glamour of a Hollywood soap opera." A two-part storyline about date-rape proved too risqué for The N officials, who delayed its broadcasting until suitable edits could be made, and other special treatments were available in the form of panel discussions, online parental guides and separately filmed introductions. The Gazette said, "You've got to hand it to the creative team behind CTV's justly celebrated teen series, Degrassi: The Next Generation. They're nothing if not a clever bunch", and Brian Orloff of the St. Petersburg Times praised the series as it "stays in touch with teens' lives".

By the end of 2003, the season had been nominated for or won several awards. The Gemini Awards named Degrassi: The Next Generation the "Best Children's or Youth Fiction Program or Series" and nominated it for "Best Short Dramatic Program". It won the "Best Interactive" category for its connection with the official website, which also won in the "Best Website" category. Bruce McDonald took home the Gemini award for "Best Direction in a Children's or Youth Program or Series" for the episode "Weird Science", and "White Wedding" earned a nomination for Stephen Withrow in the "Best Picture Editing in a Dramatic Series". "Careless Whisper" garnered Aaron Martin and Craig Cornell a nomination for "Best Writing for a Children's or Youths' Program or Series", and Jake Epstein's performance in "Tears Are Not Enough" secured him the award for "Best Performance in a Children's or Youth Program or Series". At the second annual Directors Guild of Canada Awards, "White Wedding" received recognition for Bruce McDonald in the "Outstanding Achievement in Direction – Television Series" category, and Stephen Stanley in the "Outstanding Achievement in Production Design – Short Form" category. "When Doves Cry" won in team category for "Outstanding Achievement in a Television Series – Children's", and earned Stephen Withrow an honor in the category for "Outstanding Achievement in Picture Editing – Short Form". Jake Epstein's acting earned him a second award when the Young Artist Awards gave him the award for "Best Performance in a TV Comedy Series Leading Young Actor", and the young cast was nominated for "Best Ensemble in a TV Series (Comedy or Drama)".

== Episodes ==
CTV originally aired episode fourteen, "Careless Whisper", two days before episodes twelve and the thirteen, the hour-long special "White Wedding". Episode eighteen, "Dressed in Black" aired before episode seventeen, "Relax".

In the US, The N aired season two in two blocks. The first block aired October 7, 2002 to January 13, 2003. The second block of episodes aired July 11, 2003 to August 29, 2003, but the episodes did not air in the order intended by the producers. The season finale of season one, "Jagged Little Pill", had been held over, and was shown in an edited format as this season's third episode, along with season two's true third episode to form an hour-long special. Due to the sensitive subject of rape, episodes seven and eight, the "Shout" two-part special, were held over until July 11, 2003, and opened the second half of the season creating an hour-and-a-half long special with episode twenty, "How Soon Is Now?". Because of plot continuity, episode nine, "Mirror in the Bathroom", was also held back and had its first US airing in the second week of the second block of the season, before episodes fifteen through nineteen continued to air in the correct order, followed by episodes nineteen and twenty, "Tears Are Not Enough, Parts One and Two" which were broadcast as an hour-long season finale. In re-runs and syndication, the episodes have all aired in the order the producers intended. Every episode is named after a song from the 1980s.

This list is by order of production, as they appear on the DVD.

No. overall	No. in season	Title	Directed by	Written by	Canada airdate	U.S. airdate	Prod. code
16–17	1–2	"When Doves Cry"	Bruce McDonald	Yan Moore & Aaron Martin	September 29, 2002	October 7, 2002 (The N)	201/202
As a new school year begins, Degrassi expands into a full-fledged high school encompassing seventh through twelfth grades, much to the chagrin of all the students. New ninth-grader Craig becomes quick friends with Sean and attracts Emma and Manny, but his home life is less than perfect as he deals with an abusive father and his own, growing need to be around his stepfather Joey and half-sister Angela. Meanwhile, J.T. makes desperate attempts to ask Paige out, but she refuses every time. She later changes her mind when she makes a bet with Hazel and Spinner. Note: This episode marks the first appearance of Jake Epstein as Craig Manning.
18	3	"Girls Just Wanna Have Fun"	Phil Earnshaw	Story by : Yan Moore & Shelley Scarrow; Teleplay by : Susin Nielsen	October 6, 2002	October 14, 2002 (The N)	203
Spike tells Emma she's dating her old schoolmate—Emma's teacher, Mr. Simpson. After Spike cancels a girls' night with Emma to be with him, Craig helps Emma and Manny crash the seniors' '80s dance. Meanwhile, Spinner and Jimmy find themselves competing against each other in the break-dancing contest for tickets to a Toronto Maple Leafs game, but do not fare well against the new kid, Marco. Note: This episode marks the first appearance of Adamo Ruggiero as Marco Del Rossi.
19	4	"Karma Chameleon"	Stefan Scaini	Story by : Aaron Martin & Shelley Scarrow; Teleplay by : Claire Ross Dunn	October 13, 2002	October 21, 2002 (The N)	204
With Terri by her side, Ashley attempts to make amends for her actions at her house party. She eventually earns the forgiveness of Paige and Hazel, and apologizes to Jimmy for what happened between them. Jimmy is convinced they are back together, but when Sean comes calling, Ashley makes plans to go on a date with him. The news of the date soon spreads, and Ashley is back where she started, only without Terri. Meanwhile, Toby becomes smitten with the new girl, without realizing she's Spinner's sister. Note: This episode marks the first appearances of Melissa DiMarco and Stacey Farber as Daphne Hatzilakos and Ellie Nash.
20	5	"Weird Science"	Bruce McDonald	Story by : James Hurst & Shelley Scarrow; Teleplay by : James Hurst	October 20, 2002	November 11, 2002 (The N)	205
Emma doesn't want people to know that Mr. Simpson is dating her mother as she hopes to win first place at the Science Fair. Emma ultimately wins, but the joy is short-lived when Manny accidentally emails the entire class about the relationship, and a jealous Liberty tries to convince Emma to forfeit the trophy due to a "judging bias" on Mr. Simpson's part. Meanwhile, Spinner is having trouble controlling his erections and starts eating fruit after he begins getting more attention from the girls. Upset that he was able to get Ellie's phone number, Jimmy takes advantage of Spinner's problem in a humiliating way.
21	6	"Drive"	Stefan Scaini	Story by : Aaron Martin & Jana Sinyor; Teleplay by : James Hurst	October 27, 2002	November 25, 2002 (The N)	206
Craig thinks Joey's request for him to move a car on his used-car lot gives him free rein to drive and takes his friends on a joyride when Joey goes out of town for the weekend. Meanwhile, Ashley has found a friend in Ellie and considers getting her belly button pierced to impress her.
22	7	"Shout: Part 1"	Phil Earnshaw	Story by : Aaron Martin & Claire Ross Dunn; Teleplay by : Tassie Cameron	November 3, 2002	July 11, 2003 (The N)	207
Paige meets Dean, a star soccer player at rival school Bardell, and the two share an instant attraction. When she blows off Spinner to hang out with Dean, she finds herself in a situation even she can't handle. Meanwhile, J.T. and Toby's failure to keep their shared locker clean strains their friendship.
23	8	"Shout: Part 2"	Phil Earnshaw	Story by : Aaron Martin & Craig Cornell; Teleplay by : Tassie Cameron	November 10, 2002	July 11, 2003 (The N)	208
Paige struggles to come to terms with her recent sexual assault after Ashley writes a song about rape for PMS to perform on stage for a contest. The ensuing drama results in Paige finally breaking down and revealing the truth to Ashley. Meanwhile, Liberty acts out in an attempt to show J.T. she isn't as boring as he thinks she is.
24	9	"Mirror in the Bathroom"	Paul Fox	Story by : James Hurst & Claire Ross Dunn; Teleplay by : Brendon Yorke	November 17, 2002	July 18, 2003 (The N)	209
Tired of being known as "the computer geek," Toby decides to join the wrestling team when he sees how popular Sean is. Determined to be accepted, Toby develops dangerous habits in order to lose weight, which concern both J.T. and Ashley. Meanwhile, Terri attempts to hide her job as a plus-size model from her friends. When a classmate's fat-shaming comments make her want to quit, Spinner, Paige and Hazel try to encourage Terri to continue.
25	10	"Take My Breath Away"	Stefan Scaini	Story by : Aaron Martin & Yan Moore; Teleplay by : James Hurst	November 24, 2002	December 9, 2002 (The N)	210
After crushing on him for months, Manny finally decides to ask Craig out; the next day, each remembers the evening differently while recapping it for their friends. Manny tells Emma and Liberty that it was the best night of her life, while Craig tells Jimmy and Spinner that the evening was "bizarre". Elsewhere, Ellie writes anonymous love notes to Marco, but he thinks they came from Hazel, who also has a crush on him. Ellie tries to be brave with her feelings, but her insecurities get in the way.
26	11	"Don't Believe the Hype"	Anais Granofsky	Story by : David Sutherland & James Hurst; Teleplay by : David Sutherland	December 1, 2002	December 23, 2002 (The N)	211
Hazel is the prime suspect when a Muslim girl she taunts is discriminated against on International Day, which forces her to come to terms with her own insecurities. Liberty and J.T. switch sewing projects in home economics to avoid embarrassment.
27–28	12–13	"White Wedding"	Bruce McDonald	Story by : Aaron Martin & Tassie Cameron; Teleplay by : Aaron Martin	January 5, 2003	January 6, 2003 (The N)	212/213
Emma and her mom's old friends prepare for Snake and Spike's wedding, but nothing seems to be going right at all. After finding out that Snake doesn't want to have children right away, she is later surprised to find out she is pregnant and contemplates getting an abortion in order to salvage their relationship. Meanwhile, Emma is having the worst hair day ever and grows more upset when Manny invites Sean to the wedding when she had specifically said he wasn't someone to invite. Also, J.T. and Toby want to see the stripper at Mr. Simpson's bachelor party, which gets them both in a heap of trouble.
29	14	"Careless Whisper"	Laurie Lynd	Story by : Aaron Martin & Craig Cornell; Teleplay by : Aaron Martin	January 3, 2003	January 13, 2003 (The N)	214
Ellie wants more than just friendship with Marco, but when he can't seem to bring himself to be with her, she realizes why. Meanwhile, Toby wants to spend every second with Kendra, which makes her feel suffocated.
30	15	"Hot for Teacher"	Phil Earnshaw	Story by : Jana Sinyor & Claire Ross Dunn; Teleplay by : Sean Jara	January 10, 2003	July 25, 2003 (The N)	215
J.T. earns two weeks' detention with Mrs. Hatzilakos, taking care of her pet guinea pigs. While doing his job he develops a bond with her over the class's guinea pigs which leads to a crush. Meanwhile, Jimmy and Spinner agree to an "all honesty" pact but are soon at each other's throats.
31	16	"Message in a Bottle"	Bruce McDonald	Story by : Aaron Martin & Sean Jara; Teleplay by : James Hurst	January 17, 2003	August 1, 2003 (The N)	216
Jimmy and Sean decide to bury the hatchet for the basketball team. Meanwhile, Emma and Sean are a couple again, but the latter finds himself unable to handle the pressure at home and jeopardizes their relationship once again. Also, Jimmy hosts a party at his house and starts rekindling some old feelings with Ashley.
32	17	"Relax"	Laurie Lynd	Story by : Shelley Scarrow & Sean Jara; Teleplay by : Craig Cornell	January 26, 2003	August 8, 2003 (The N)	217
Liberty doesn't make the girls' floor hockey team but gets to be team manager. While doing this job, she pushes her friends away due to her bossy attitude. Meanwhile, Paige uses Terri to her advantage after Terri misinterprets the palm reading she did on her.
33	18	"Dressed in Black"	Gavin Smith	Story by : Sean Jara & Aaron Martin; Teleplay by : Jana Sinyor	January 19, 2003	August 15, 2003 (The N)	218
Ashley's relationship with Jimmy seems to be back on track—until he says he preferred her old look to her new Goth one. Meanwhile, after sex ed lecture, J.T. convinces Toby to buy condoms in order to have sex with Kendra, something to which both Kendra and Spinner object.
34	19	"Fight for Your Right"	Chris Deacon	Story by : Aaron Martin & Sean Jara; Teleplay by : Susin Nielsen	February 2, 2003	August 22, 2003 (The N)	219
Mr. Raditch's dismissal of Emma's protest against genetically modified food in the cafeteria inadvertently leads to a food fight. Given the chance to apologize, she stands firm and finds herself suspended. Meanwhile, Spinner is frustrated when he can't afford to do what Jimmy does: buy whatever he wants. His method of getting the money to do so causes Jimmy to end their friendship.
35	20	"How Soon is Now?"	Eleanore Lindo	Story by : Craig Cornell & James Hurst; Teleplay by : Shelley Scarrow	February 9, 2003	July 11, 2003 (The N)	220
Paige is finally coming to terms with her rape, just as Dean and the Bardell team return to Degrassi for a basketball game. She tries to be strong, but Dean's taunts about raping her cause Paige to distance herself from the Spirit Squad before the big game. Meanwhile, Ellie and Marco film a commercial for Snake's class but argue over what the style should be.
36	21	"Tears Are Not Enough: Part One"	Phil Earnshaw	Story by : Aaron Martin & James Hurst; Teleplay by : Aaron Martin	February 16, 2003	August 29, 2003 (The N)	221
Craig's dad returns to his life, and Craig doesn't know if he can deal with his dad's pressure to move back home. But when the unspeakable happens, that might not be a choice. Meanwhile, J.T. agrees to be Liberty's date to the dance but only if she tutors him.
37	22	"Tears Are Not Enough: Part Two"	Phil Earnshaw	Story by : Aaron Martin & James Hurst; Teleplay by : Aaron Martin	February 23, 2003	August 29, 2003 (The N)	222
When his father dies, Craig seems happy, especially with the year end dance coming up. However, he finds out getting over it is harder than he thought. After making a scene at the dance, Craig disappears into the halls, where Terri consoles him. Meanwhile, Paige and Spinner run for Luau King and Queen, but Jimmy convinces Hazel to join him and go against them out of spite.

== DVD release ==
The DVD release of season two was released by Alliance Atlantis Home Entertainment in Canada, and by FUNimation Entertainment in the US on 21 June 2005 after it had completed broadcast on television. As well as every episode from the season, the DVD release features bonus material including deleted scenes, bloopers and behind-the-scenes featurettes. in Australia Season 2 is currently being released by Umbrella Entertainment.

The Complete Second Season
Set details		Special features
22 director's cut episodes; 4-disc set; 1.33:1 aspect ratio; Languages: English (Dolby Digital 5.1)		130+ deleted/extended scenes and bloopers; Cast audition tapes; Season 2 second call back tapes; "Poor Thing" karaoke; Interactive fan quiz; Degrassi yearbook; Snake and Spike's wedding album; Student and adult profiles; Cast biographies; Note: Australian DVD release only features 72 deleted scenes
Release dates		130+ deleted/extended scenes and bloopers; Cast audition tapes; Season 2 second call back tapes; "Poor Thing" karaoke; Interactive fan quiz; Degrassi yearbook; Snake and Spike's wedding album; Student and adult profiles; Cast biographies; Note: Australian DVD release only features 72 deleted scenes
(Canada) (United States) Region 1	(Australia) Region 4	130+ deleted/extended scenes and bloopers; Cast audition tapes; Season 2 second call back tapes; "Poor Thing" karaoke; Interactive fan quiz; Degrassi yearbook; Snake and Spike's wedding album; Student and adult profiles; Cast biographies; Note: Australian DVD release only features 72 deleted scenes
21 June 2005	8 September 2010	130+ deleted/extended scenes and bloopers; Cast audition tapes; Season 2 second call back tapes; "Poor Thing" karaoke; Interactive fan quiz; Degrassi yearbook; Snake and Spike's wedding album; Student and adult profiles; Cast biographies; Note: Australian DVD release only features 72 deleted scenes

== Notes ==
- Ellis, Kathryn (September 2005). Degrassi: Generations – The Official 411. New York, New York: Pocket Books. ISBN 978-1-4165-1680-4.
