= I'm Upset =

Single by Drake

from the album Scorpion
- Released: May 26, 2018
- Genre: Hip hop; trap
- Length: 3:34
- Label: Young Money; Cash Money
- Songwriters: Aubrey Graham; Jordan Ortiz
- Producer: Oogie Mane

Drake singles chronology
"Yes Indeed" (2018)	"I'm Upset" (2018)	"Bigger Than You" (2018)

Music video
- "I'm Upset" on YouTube

"I'm Upset" is a song by Canadian rapper Drake from his fifth studio album Scorpion (2018). It was released by Young Money Entertainment and Cash Money Records as the third single from the album on May 26, 2018. The song was written by Drake alongside producer Oogie Mane of Working on Dying.

== Composition ==
"I'm Upset" is a hip hop song that features a trap production and "rolling hi-hats, deep bass and a subdued piano loop", with Drake rapping lines such as "I'm upset/50,000 on my head, it's disrespect". Drake also references needing to pay a woman's bills every month and "get her what she want".

== Critical reception ==
Jayson Greene wrote for Pitchfork, "But above all it is boring. Drake doesn't switch up his flow, the minimal beat drones on, and we are asked to take a rap song with the chanted chorus 'I'm upset' with a straight face. 'I'm upset' is not self-expression; it is what you teach a toddler to howl instead of pulling someone's hair."

Sara Hendricks of Refinery29 labeled the song "misogynistic," criticizing Drake's use of the slur "ho" and stating that it undercut any positive reference to women in the song. Hendricks also stated, "This points to a larger problem that Drake has been dealing with since the inception of his career. He can see value in women if they perform in a way that he deems satisfactory, but with any infraction, they immediately lose any value they might have once had to him."

Stefanie Fernández of NPR stated that the song "was just really OK" when judged separately from its nostalgic music video featuring most of Drake's former Degrassi: The Next Generation co-stars. Her colleague, Sidney Madden, agreed, stating, "In terms of songs, it's not his hottest this year. The video makes the song."

Music critic Mark Grondin of Spectrum Pulse described "I'm Upset" as "a mediocre slog of a song" with a "sour-faced bitchiness."

Jessica McKinney of Vibe characterized the song as "signal[ing] Drake's frustrations as well as his fear of gold diggers trying to take him for all that he has." She reported that fans' reactions to the song on social media were overwhelmingly positive, with only a minority of them expressing criticism.

== Music video ==
The music video was directed by Karena Evans, and it features Drake reuniting with former cast members of Degrassi: The Next Generation, the Canadian teen drama series on which he portrayed the character Jimmy Brooks from 2001 to 2008.

The video features appearances by Degrassi cast members Stefan Brogren, Lauren Collins, Nina Dobrev, Jake Epstein, Stacey Farber, Shane Kippel, A.J. Saudin, Cassie Steele, Melissa McIntyre, Adamo Ruggiero, Christina Schmidt, Miriam McDonald, Sarah Barrable-Tishauer, Jake Goldsbie, Andrea Lewis, Marc Donato, Dalmar Abuzeid, Paula Brancati, Ephraim Ellis, and Linlyn Lue, as well as cameo appearances from Kevin Smith and Jason Mewes reprising their Jay and Silent Bob characters from Smith's View Askewniverse film series. Ryan Cooley, who portrayed J.T. Yorke on the show, does not appear in the video. When a fan complained on social media about Cooley's exclusion, Drake replied that Cooley thought the invitation to be in the video was a "scam." (During a 2026 podcast appearance, Cooley denied that he thought the invitation was fraudulent and said he missed the shoot because he instead chose to visit his best friend, who had just given birth to twins.) Daniel Clark, Mike Lobel, and Deanna Klymkiw (née Casaluce)—who portrayed Sean Cameron, Jay Hogart, and Alex Nuñez, respectively—also do not appear in the video. Clark and Lobel said they did not receive an invitation to participate.

== Personnel ==
Credits adapted from Tidal.

- Noah "40" Shebib – recording engineering
- Noel Cadastre – recording engineering
- Noel "Gadget" Campbell – mixing
- Greg Moffet – assistant mixing
- Ronald Moonoo – assistant mixing
- Harley Arsenault – assistant mixing
- Oogie Mane – production

== Charts ==
=== Weekly charts ===
Chart (2018)	Peak position
Australia (ARIA)	17
Austria (Ö3 Austria Top 40)	63
Belgium (Ultratip Bubbling Under Flanders)	12
Canada Hot 100 (Billboard)	5
Czech Republic Singles Digital (ČNS IFPI)	69
France (SNEP)	82
Germany (GfK)	79
Greece (IFPI Greece)	13
Ireland (IRMA)	54
Netherlands (Single Top 100)	40
New Zealand (Recorded Music NZ)	13
Portugal (AFP)	17
Scottish Singles Sales (Official Charts)	62
Slovakia Singles Digital (ČNS IFPI)	39
Sweden (Sverigetopplistan)	51
Switzerland (Schweizer Hitparade)	91
UK Singles (Official Charts)	37
UK Hip Hop/R&B (Official Charts)	18
US Billboard Hot 100	7
US Hot R&B/Hip-Hop Songs (Billboard)	6

=== Year-end charts ===
Chart (2018)	Position
Canada (Canadian Hot 100)	71
US Billboard Hot 100	86
US Hot R&B/Hip-Hop Songs (Billboard)	45

== Certifications ==
Region	Certification	Certified units/sales
Australia (ARIA)	Platinum	70,000^{‡}
Brazil (Pro-Música Brasil)	Platinum	40,000^{‡}
Canada (Music Canada)	Platinum	80,000^{‡}
Portugal (AFP)	Gold	5,000^{‡}
United Kingdom (BPI)	Gold	400,000^{‡}
United States (RIAA)	3× Platinum	3,000,000^{‡}
^{‡} Sales+streaming figures based on certification alone.
