= Christina Schmidt =

Canadian actress and model

- Born: September 16, 1987 (age 38); Waterloo, Ontario, Canada
- Other name: Chrissy Schmidt
- Occupations: Model, actress
- Years active: 2000–2004, 2018

Christina Schmidt (born September 16, 1987), sometimes credited as Chrissy Schmidt, is a Canadian actress and model.

== Early life ==
Schmidt was born and raised in the Kitchener-Waterloo area. She attended school at Waterloo-Oxford and Cameron Heights in Kitchener.

She took acting classes with television actor Dean Armstrong, known in the United States for his participation on Showtime's series Queer as Folk. She trained before becoming an actress, with Kids on Camera and The Second City, two prestigious training companies for aspiring actors. Her classes led to her first appearance, in the 2000 short film Notes from Mother.

== Career ==
Her big break came when she was hired to play Terri McGreggor in the Canadian television hit Degrassi: The Next Generation. The role was a challenge for the teenage Schmidt, because the character is insecure about her self-image and appearance, and becomes entangled in an abusive relationship. She continued in the role until season 3, when her character was put into a coma by her boyfriend.

Following her departure from the show, she began a modeling career. She was represented in fashion and print modelling by B&M Models in Toronto. She appeared in the fall 2007 ad campaign for MXM, a Canadian junior plus-size clothing line. She has modelled for Torrid and Nygard. Some more of her work includes Canadian designers Hilary MacMillan, Lesley Hampton, and Hayley Elsaesser.

She also stars as one of the professional runway models in the show How to Look Good Naked Canada on the W Network.

In 2018, she reunited with her Degrassi co-stars in Drake's music video for his single "I'm Upset".

She currently is represented by LeDrew Models.

== Filmography ==
=== Television ===
Year	Title	Role	Notes
2001	Le porte-bonheur	Violaine Galdes	Television film
2001-2004	Degrassi: The Next Generation	Terri McGreggor	Main role

=== Music videos ===
Year	Title	Artist
2018	"I'm Upset"	Drake

== Awards and nominations ==
Year	Award	Category	Nominated work	Result	Notes	Ref.
2002	Young Artist Awards	Best Ensemble in a TV Series (Comedy or Drama)	Degrassi: The Next Generation	Won		
2003	Young Artist Awards	Best Ensemble in a TV Series (Comedy or Drama)	Degrassi: The Next Generation	Nominated		
2005	Young Artist Awards	Outstanding Young Performers in a TV Series	Degrassi: The Next Generation	Nominated		
2005	Young Artist Awards	Best Performance in a TV Series (Comedy or Drama) - Supporting Young Actress	Degrassi: The Next Generation	Won	Tied with Alia Shawkat	
