= Cybermutt =

- Cybermutt DVD cover
- Written by: Kevin Commins; Gerald Sanford
- Directed by: George T. Miller
- Starring: Judd Nelson; Paulina Mielech; Khafre Armatrading; Ryan Cooley; Ian Bradley-Perrin
- Music by: Christian Henson
- Countries of origin: Canada; United Kingdom; Germany
- Original language: English

Production
- Producers: Martin J. Barab; J. David Williams
- Cinematography: Russ Goozee
- Editor: Ron Wisman
- Running time: 95 minutes
- Production companies: Tag Entertainment; Grosvenor Park Productions; Apollo Media

Original release
- Network: Animal Planet
- Release: 2002

Cybermutt is a 2002 comic science fiction film that was made for Animal Planet as part of a trio of movies for the cable channel called "Animal Tales". Cybermutt is a fictional Golden Retriever.

== Plot ==
The story centers on a young boy, Nino (Ryan Cooley), and his family dog, Rex, who takes on a significant role in Nino's life after the boy loses his father to cancer. During a stroll in the park with Nino and his mother, Rex manages to save the life of the eccentric inventor and dotcom wiz, Alex (Judd Nelson). Rex is badly injured during his act of heroism and Alex, as a gesture of gratitude, takes the dog back to his bionics lab to rebuild him. Through cutting edge gadgetry, Rex is imbued with super powers and becomes the target of villains determined to possess the new technology at any cost. After the procedure, Rex is capable of feats of great strength, can see in infrared vision and run at 70 mph.

== Cast ==
- Judd Nelson – Alex
- Ryan Cooley – Nino
- Michelle Nolden – Juliet
- Paulina Mielech – Erica
- Tonio Arango – Temple
- Joe Pingue – Max
- Pedro Salvin – Rubio
- Khafre Armatrading – Kyle
- Bryon Bully – Bully #1
- Ian Bradley-Perrin – Bully #2
