= Jana Sinyor =

Canadian television writer and producer

- Born: 1976 (age 48–49); Ottawa, Ontario, Canada
- Occupation(s): Television writer and producer
- Known for: Creator of Being Erica

Jana Sinyor (born 1976) is a Canadian television writer and producer. She is best known as the creator of the television comedy-drama series Being Erica and Dark Oracle.

== Early life ==
Sinyor was born in Ottawa, Canada, and raised in the Jewish faith as the daughter of Egypt-born father, Albert (a medical-equipment manufacturer) and mother, Lynda (a computer programmer and teacher). She received a Bachelor of Arts degree in religious studies from Montreal's McGill University in 1998. She then worked in a call center for a year before taking a screenwriting course at Ryerson University in Toronto and going on to study at the Canadian Film Centre.

== Career ==
She was a writer on seasons 2 and 3 of Degrassi: The Next Generation.

Sinyor created the comedy drama time-travel series Being Erica, which ran four seasons from 2009 to 2011. She made brief cameo appearances in three episodes of Being Erica playing the role of Jana: in the season one finale, "Leo", as the person living in Erica's (unexpectedly former) apartment after Erica has changed the timeline by saving Leo; in the second last episode of season 2, "Erica, Interrupted"; and in the series finale, "Dr. Erica", she appeared with Aaron – played by the show's executive producer, Aaron Martin – as a bickering couple.

== Personal life ==
As of at least 2010, Sinyor is married to entrepreneur David Singer, with whom she has two children, Jada and Max.
