= Grosvenor Park Productions =

British-American production and film-financing company

- Type: Private
- Industry: Film production
- Headquarters: Los Angeles, California, United States
- Number of locations: Los Angeles, California; London, United Kingdom
- Area served: Worldwide
- Website: www.grosvenorpark.com

Grosvenor Park Productions is a British-American production and film-financing company. It is owned by Canadian film financing mogul Don Starr, headquartered in Los Angeles, California, and has an international office in London, England.

== Filmography ==
- White Fang (1993)
- Starhunter (2000)
- Buffalo Soldiers (2001)
- Spider (2002)
- Cybermutt (2002)
- Stander (2003)
- Penelope (2006/2008)
- The Good Night (2007)
- I Want Candy (2007)
- P.S. I Love You (2007)
- Battle in Seattle (2007)
- Love in the Time of Cholera (2007)
- Disaster Movie (2008)
- The Hurt Locker (2008)
- Defiance (2008)
- Righteous Kill (2008)
- Mutant Chronicles (2008)
- While She Was Out (2008)
- Powder Blue (2008)
- New York, I Love You (2009)
- Thick as Thieves (2009)
- Ghost in the Shell (2017)
