= List of locations in the Degrassi franchise =

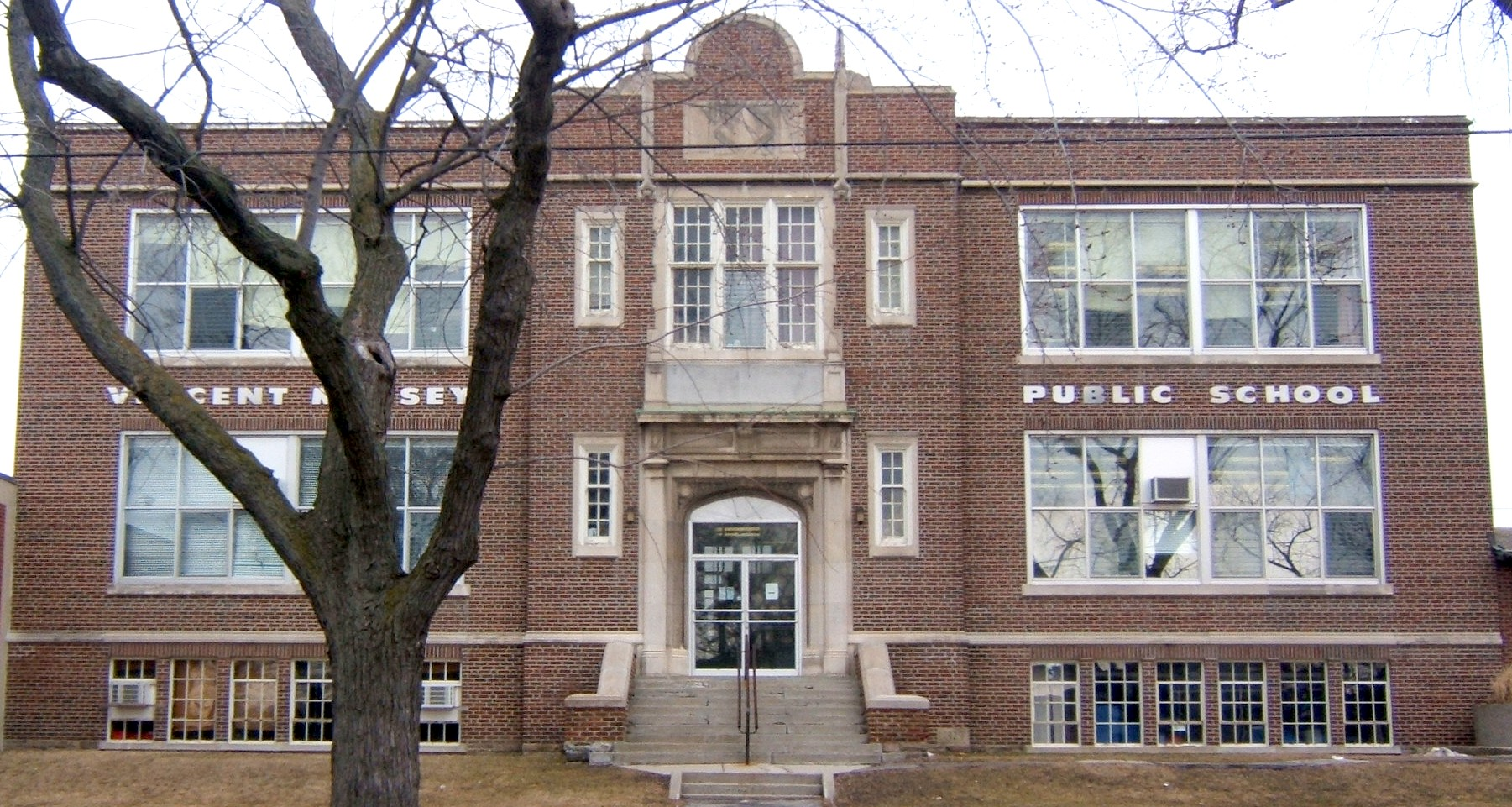
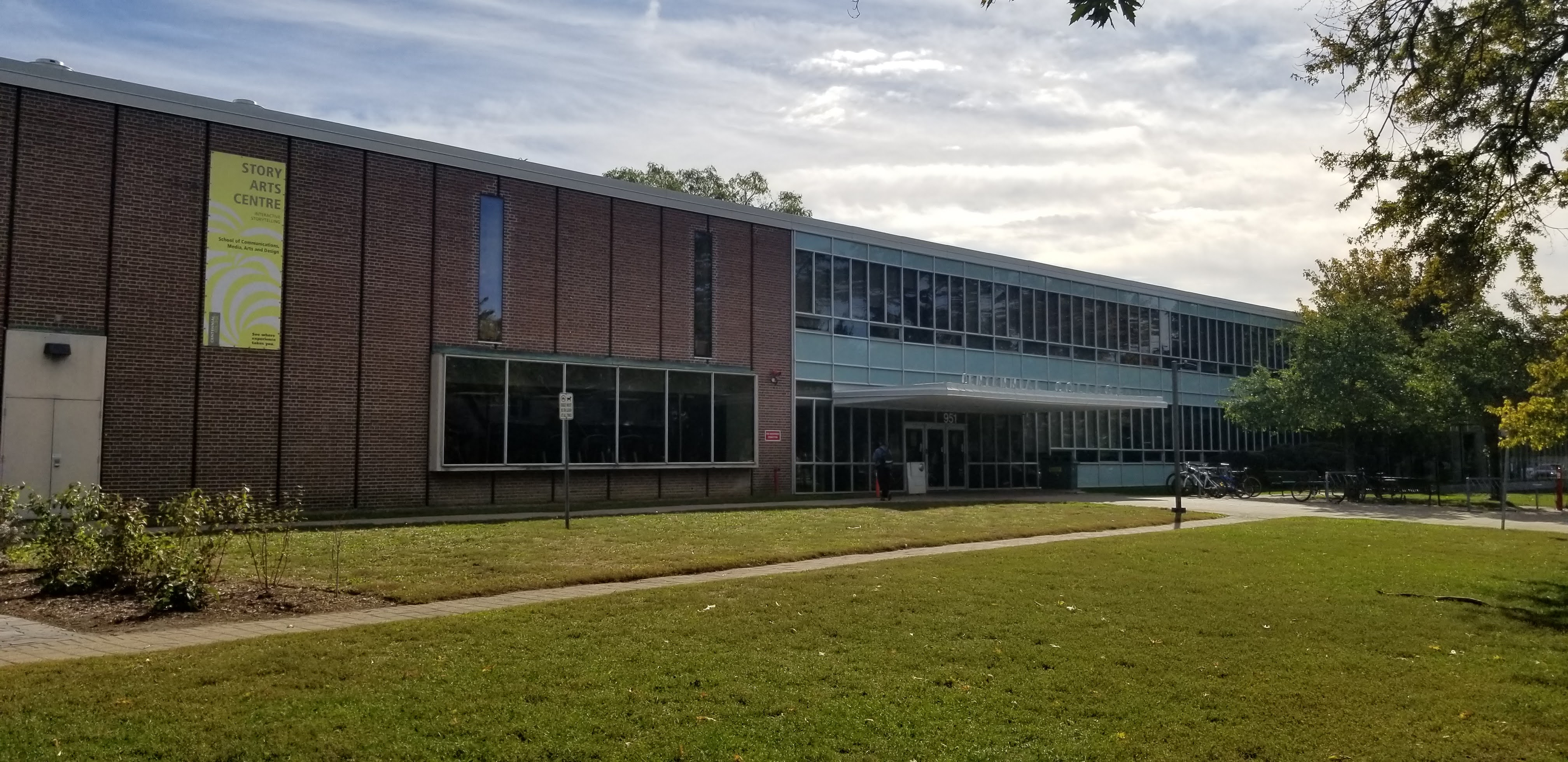
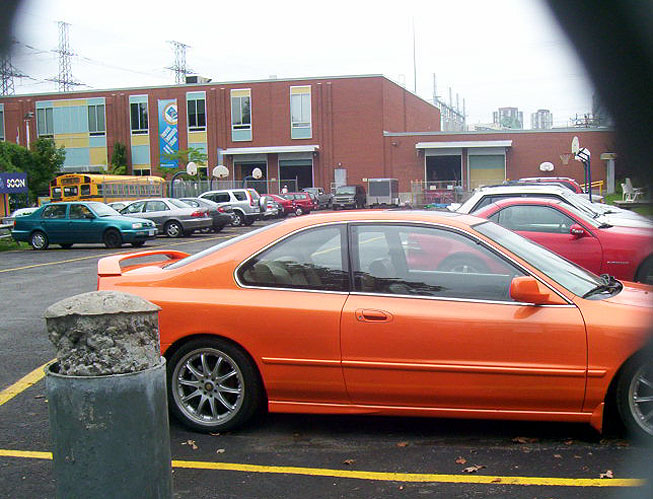
The locations depicted as the titular school throughout the years. Left to right: Vincent Massey Public School (Degrassi Junior High), Centennial College Story Arts Centre (Degrassi High) and the Epitome Pictures studio set (Degrassi: The Next Generation/Next Class).

This is a list of places seen and featured in the Degrassi teen drama franchise. All five series of the franchise are set in Toronto, with both real and fictional places in the city depicted.

== Degrassi Junior High and Degrassi High ==
- Degrassi Junior High School – The middle school the cast attends, which burns down at the end of the third season. The building used for the school was Vincent Massey Junior School in Etobicoke.
- Degrassi High School – The high school the cast attends for the final two seasons of the series.
- Borden High School – The high school that the ninth grade students attend part-time for science in the third season. Some of the upperclassmen are shown to be hostile towards the Degrassi students, although this seems to cease after one of the Borden students utters a racial slur towards Bryant "B.L.T." Lester Thomas—a black Degrassi student, resulting in an altercation. One notable student is Clutch, who is briefly Lucy's boyfriend and later transferred to Degrassi High School. Paul, Clutch's friend who briefly dated Lucy, also attended the school.
- Lucy's house – The location of many parties throughout the series. It was here where Spike and Shane had sex, resulting in Spike becoming pregnant with Emma.
- Shoppers Drug Mart – The drugstore where Arthur and Stephanie Kaye's mother works. Also where Spike purchased a home pregnancy test with the aid of friends Erica and Heather; Wheels and Joey visited to purchase condoms, and Erica also later visited to purchase a home pregnancy test. Joey is seen working at the location in School's Out.

=== School's Out ===
- Bronco's cottage – The location where much of School's Out takes place.
- Schulyer High – The high school the students transferred to after Degrassi got shut down in the final episode. This school is only mentioned by name and never seen.

== Degrassi: The Next Generation ==
- Above the Dot – An all-ages substance-free music venue above The Dot Grill that Peter opened in season 9.
- Banting University – The university that Paige attends before dropping out. Liberty and Damien plan on attending Banting. Located near Kingston, Ontario.
- Bardell High School – A high school in the Toronto area that competed with Degrassi students in various episodes at sports events. One notable student is Dean, known for a major plot point in which he rapes Paige Michalchuk.
- The Break Room – A pool hall introduced in the seventh season.
- CQJH – A TV studio where Caitlin works in seasons 3 and 4.
- Degrassi Community School – The central school.
- The Dot, formerly The Dot Grill – A café that is a hangout spot for many Degrassi students. The establishment serves food, drinks, and snacks. It suffers a severe fire at the end of season 9, but is renovated before season 10. Spinner is the manager; past employees include Paige, and Holly J., and Peter.
- Lakehurst High School – A high school that burned down during semester break between seasons 6 and 7, resulting in its students being transferred to Degrassi.
- Little Miss Steaks – Introduced in season 10, is a country and western themed restaurant. Holly J. was a waitress there. Marisol is a waitress there in season 11, and KC is a busboy.
- The ravine – A place to smoke, drink beer, and "hook up." (Since season 4)
- Smithdale University – The university Manny, Emma, and Liberty attend. Degrassi Goes Hollywood takes place in part at Smithdale.
- University of Toronto – An actual university, it is the university Ellie and Johnny attends. Some outside scenes are shot at the University of Toronto.
- TVM – A parody of MTV, is a music channel with headquarters in New York City. First seen in Degrassi Takes Manhattan, its studios were filmed at the MuchMusic studios at 299 Queen Street West, Toronto.
- Vanderbilt Prep – A New York private school where Bobby Breckinridge, Declan Coyne, and for a short time, Fiona Coyne, attend twelfth grade in season 10
- Zanzibar – A strip club where Alex works in "Don't You Want Me?". Unlike most of the locations mentioned in the Degrassi series, Zanzibar Tavern is a real strip club located on Yonge Street in Toronto.

== Degrassi: Next Class ==
- Lola's Cantina – A restaurant run by Lola's family.
- Northern Tech – The Degrassi volleyball team's rivals who accuse the team of being racist. This is a real school in Toronto.
- The Dot – A café that is a hangout spot for many Degrassi students; the establishment serves food, drinks, and snacks.

=== Degrassi Community School ===
Degrassi Community School

Location
- 240 De Grassi Street; Toronto, Ontario, M4A 1Q3; Canada
- 43°43′11″N 79°19′1″W

Information
- Motto: Pro Disciplina Colligo (For teaching, assemble)
- Opened: 1986
- Status: open
- School board: Toronto District School Board
- Principal: Dan Raditch (up to season 4); Daphne Hatzilakos (seasons 5–7, 9); Mr. Sheppard (season 8–9); Archie "Snake" Simpson (seasons 10–14, Next Class 1-present); Deidre Pill (season 14)
- Faculty: see Faculty
- Grades: 7–8 (up to season 1); 7–12 (seasons 2–5); 9–12 (seasons 6–present)
- Language: English
- Colours: Gold & blue
- Slogan: The perfect human being is all human beings put together, it is a collective, it is all of us together that make perfection. — Socrates
- Sports: Basketball, football, gymnastics, lacrosse, soccer, power squad, wrestling, power cheer, volleyball
- Mascot: Panther
- Nickname: Degrassi
- Team name: Panthers
- Rival: Bardell High School, Lakehurst High School, (until it burned)
- Publication: The Grapevine, The Anti-Grapevine, The Degrassi Daily

Degrassi Community School is a fictional high school in Degrassi: The Next Generation and the titular academy primarily associated with it. It consists of students from grade 7 through grade 12 and its student body is made up of students from many cultures and backgrounds, paralleling and reflecting the multiculturalism associated with Toronto. The school originally was a junior high, housing grades 7–8. In season two, the school took on high school students after the neighbouring high school shut down (mainly so that the characters could all attend the same school) and housed grades 7–12 for four years before dropping grades 7–8 and becoming a high school. However, this is not a real school; the set is a warehouse sized studio made to look like one at Epitome's studios. After season 4, there have been no characters on the show, minor or major, in grades 7 or 8. In season 10 a school uniform is instituted and the shirts are colour-coded by grade. This is dropped in season 12.

==== History ====
Founded in 1986 as Degrassi Junior High School, the facility is believed to be the same facility used in Degrassi Junior High and Degrassi High. In 1989, it combined with a high school, and became Degrassi High. The school was remodelled and renamed to "Degrassi Community School" for the school year starting in September 2001, and played host to the 1991 Ten Year High School Reunion shortly thereafter.

In 2001, the school held its first nighttime dance entitled "Starlight, Starbright."

At the start of season 7, Degrassi Community School merged with rival school, Lakehurst High School, causing much friction between both schools, much of which had to do with the recent stabbing and death of Degrassi student J.T. Yorke. The rivalry resulted in many fights and animosity between the students.

==== Academics ====
===== Media Immersion Program =====
One of the most distinctive programs featured in the Degrassi Community School, is its Media Immersion program (taught by Mr. Simpson up to season 9 and Mrs. Oh until Season 14. It is held in the computer lab). The program features high speed computers with internet access (via ADSL as of 2001) and other educational programs. It also features the most up to date media software programs, all part of the new renovation planned by Mr. Raditch, "proudly bringing Degrassi to the 21st Century".

The computer lab uses a network, notably using a system called "D-Mail," where students may instant message each other, and send e-mails.

Eighteen new computers were provided by the television program NaK, News About Kids, in exchange for showing their morning broadcasts. Though biased and a source for propaganda which also promotes certain commercial products, the NaK broadcasts were consented to be shown by a vote of parents of the Degrassi students.

==== Faculty ====
- Principal Daniel Raditch, (Former) Principal and literature teacher in the Degrassi Junior High and Degrassi High series
- Principal Daphne Hatzilakos, (Former) Principal, science teacher and gym/school coach
- Principal Sheppard, (Former) Principal and football coach
- Principal Archie Simpson, Current Principal, and former media immersion teacher
- Principal Deidre Pill, (Former) Acting Principal
- Mr. Armstrong, Gym/school coach and math teacher
- Ms. Badger, Science teacher
- Mrs. Bollinger, (Former) media immersion assistant
- Ms. Dawes, (Former) Art, drama, English teacher
- Mr. Ellis, (Former) Chemistry and science teacher
- Mrs. Lin, Mandarin teacher
- Ms. Grell, Digital Arts, career studies, and rubber room teacher
- Mr. Mitchell, Current English and Economics teacher
- Mrs. Kwan, (Former) English and drama teacher
- Ms. Oh, (Former) Media immersion teacher
- Mr. Dom Perino, History teacher
- Ms. Chantel Sauve, School guidance counselor
- Sheila, (Former) lunch lady
- Mrs. Smith, Secretary
- Mr. Odie, (Former) History teacher
- Mrs. Jasmia Toomer, (Former) web mastering

==== Layout ====
Completely renovated and changed by 2001, the Degrassi Community School features a non-traditional design scheme using new materials. Named a Community School, Degrassi does not follow the typical public school layout but is closer to being identified as an alternative school. By 2002, the school had again been completely changed and reinvented as it merged to become both a junior high school and high school.

There are multiple unique aspects of the Degrassi school. In the spacious front lobby, a mural outlooks the front steps, one later redrawn by Jimmy Brooks. Written primarily at the top of the walls above the locker/hallway areas, there are a number of inspirational quotes displayed. The main foyer is host to Degrassi's own motto, written larger and more distinctively than the other quotes.

After J.T. is murdered in season six, a memorial garden at the school is built in his name.

The school was again renovated sometime during the summer of 2015. The school interior received a new paint job while the lockers were painted to feature a more retro look. All wooden classroom doors were also replaced with new grey doors. Several classrooms are also now equipped with smart-boards and HD television sets for a more digital learning environment. New desks were also included in the redesign. Additional areas in the school include a student lounge room, several sitting areas with cushioned chairs laid around the school, and a renovated classroom for a new course titled Digital Arts.

The actual set for where the school scenes are shot in is a warehouse sized studio at Epitome Pictures. Outfitted to look like an actual school, the set features perhaps the most intricate and detailed designs, including numerous fliers, bulletins, and posters pertaining to the fictional Degrassi Community School. The studio is also used for filming other sets, such as characters' bedrooms, in the series.

==== Extracurricular activities ====
Basketball
Mr. Armstrong (season 1-present, coach), Jimmy Brooks (seasons 1–7, captain; seasons 6–7, assistant coach), Spinner Mason (seasons 1, 3, team manager), Sean Cameron, Derek Haig, K.C. Guthrie, Dave Turner, Connor Deslauriers (water-boy)
Called the Degrassi Panthers, the basketball team is one of the proudest school teams, defeating various rival schools and even having a chance for the regionals. In the beginning of 2001, 15 hopefuls tried out for the team but there were only 12 spots. As Armstrong judged who made the team based on their game performance against Earl Grey, Jimmy and Spinner were cut from the team (the former would be reinstated at the end of the semester).
Cheerleading a.k.a. Spirit Squad (seasons 1–7), Power Squad (seasons 8–13), Power Cheer (season 14)
Paige Michalchuk (seasons 1–5, captain), Hazel Aden (seasons 1–5, co-captain), Manny Santos (seasons 1–5, 7, choreographer), Darcy Edwards (seasons 4–7, captain), Peter Stone (season 6), Chantay Black (seasons 4–10, captain), Mia Jones (seasons 7–8; captain), Holly J. Sinclair (seasons 7–8, captain), Anya MacPherson (seasons 7–10), Jenna Middleton (seasons 9–10), Marisol Lewis (seasons 10–11), Tori Santamaria (season 11), Becky Baker (season 14), Frankie Hollingsworth (season 14), Jack Jones (season 14), Lola Pacini (season 14), Shay Powers (season 14), Zoe Rivas (Season 14)
Girls Floor Hockey
Ms. Hatzilakos (season 2, Coach), Liberty Van Zandt (season 2, Manager), Emma Nelson (season 2, Captain), Manny Santos (season 2), Kendra Mason (season 2)
The Grapevine
Liberty Van Zandt (seasons 1–7), Ellie Nash (seasons 2–5), Anya MacPherson (season 7)
The Anti-Grapevine
Chantay Black (seasons 8–10), Anya MacPherson (seasons 8–10)
The Degrassi Daily
Katie Matlin (seasons 11–12), Marisol Lewis (seasons 11–12), Clare Edwards (seasons 11–14)
Football
Derek Haig, Bruce the Moose, Jane Vaughn, Danny Van Zandt, Riley Stavros, Sav Bhandari, Drew Torres, K.C. Guthrie, Zane Park, Owen Milligan, Connor Deslauriers, Mo Mashkour
Gymnastics
Manny Santos, Emma Nelson, Hazel Aden, Kendra Mason
Lacrosse
Terri McGreggor, Kendra Mason, Alex Nuñez, Meredith Miller, Serena
Hockey
Luke Baker (season 12), Campbell Saunders (season 12), Mike Dallas (season 12), Owen Milligan (season 12)
Mascot
J.T. Yorke (seasons 1–6), Danny Van Zandt (seasons 8–9), Zig Novak (season 11)
Soccer
Spinner Mason, Jimmy Brooks
Video Announcements
Liberty Van Zandt, Emma Nelson, Heather Sinclair, Ashley Kerwin, Holly J. Sinclair, Sav Bhandari, Katie Matlin
Wrestling
Sean Cameron, Toby Isaacs
Volleyball
Frankie Hollingsworth, Goldi Nahir, Lola Pacini, Shay Powers
Gamer Club
Yael Baron, Hunter Hollingsworth, Vijay Maraj, Baaz Nahir, Lola Pacini
Girls Track
Shay Powers, Frankie Hollingsworth, Esme Song

==== Student council ====
- President: Ashley Kerwin
  - Secretary: Liberty Van Zandt
  - Beginning of Presidency: Family Politics (DTNG 103)
  - End of Presidency: Jagged Little Pill (DTNG 115)
- President: Marco Del Rossi
  - Vice-President: Alex Nunez
  - Beginning of Presidency: King of Pain (DTNG 403)
  - End of Presidency: Death of a Disco Dancer (DTNG 503)
- President: Liberty Van Zandt
  - Vice-President: Toby Isaacs
  - Beginning of Presidency: Death of a Disco Dancer (DTNG 503)
  - End of Presidency: We Built This City (DTNG 724)
- President: Holly J. Sinclair
  - Secretary Danny Van Zandt
  - Beginning of Presidency: Didn't We Almost Have It All (DTNG 804)
  - End of Presidency: The Rest of My Life, Part 1 (DTNG 920)
- President: Sav Bhandari
  - Vice-President: Holly J. Sinclair
  - Beginning of Presidency: Breakaway, Part 1 (DTNG 1003)
  - End of Presidency: Take a Bow, Part 2 (DTNG 1127)
- President: Katie Matlin
  - Vice-President: Marisol Lewis
  - Beginning of Presidency: Dead & Gone, Part 1 (DTNG 1128)
  - End of Presidency: Hollaback Girl, Part 2 (DTNG 1143)
- Acting President: Marisol Lewis
  - Social Coordinator: Fiona Coyne
  - Beginning of Interim-ship: Hollaback Girl, Part 2 (DTNG 1143)
  - End of Presidency: It's the End of the World as We Know It, Part 2 (DTNG 1240)
- President: Drew Torres
  - Vice-President: Clare Edwards
  - Beginning of Presidency: Summertime (DTNG 1301)
  - End of Presidency: Finally, Part 2 (DTNG 1424)
- President: Miles Hollingsworth III
  - Vice-President: Tristan Milligan
  - Beginning of Presidency: #BootyCall (DNC 101)
  - End of Presidency: #BootyCall (DNC 101)
- President: Tristan Milligan
  - Co-Vice Presidents: Winston Chu & Goldi Nahir
  - Beginning of Presidency: #NoFilter (DNC 102)
  - End of Presidency: #OMFG (DNC 210)
- Acting President: Zoe Rivas
  - Vice President: Goldi Nahir
  - Beginning of Presidency: #BreakTheInternet (DNC 301)
  - End of Presidency: #KThxBye (DNC 410)

==== Alumni ====
Graduated at Degrassi

- Classes of '92 & '93: Joey Jeremiah, Christine "Spike" Nelson, Caitlin Ryan, Archie "Snake" Simpson, Lucy Fernandez, Derek "Wheels" Wheeler
- Class of '04: Dylan Michalchuk
- Class of '06: Hazel Aden, Marco Del Rossi, Paige Michalchuk, Ellie Nash, Alex Nuñez, Heather Sinclair
- Class of '07: Jimmy Brooks, Damian Hayes, Toby Isaacs, Gavin "Spinner" Mason, Emma Nelson, Manny Santos, Liberty Van Zandt
- Class of '08: Johnny DiMarco, Peter Stone, Jane Vaughn, Danny Van Zandt
- Class of '11: Sav Bhandari, Chantay Black, Anya MacPherson, Zane Park, Holly J. Sinclair, Riley Stavros
- Class of '13 Fiona Coyne, Bianca DeSousa, Eli Goldsworthy, Marisol Lewis, Jake Martin, Mo Mashkour, Katie Matlin, Owen Milligan
- Class of '14: Becky Baker, Alli Bhandari, Mike Dallas, Connor Deslauriers, Clare Edwards, Jenna Middleton, Imogen Moreno, Drew Torres
- Class of '17: Tiny Bell, Grace Cardinal, Winston Chu, Jonah Haak, Miles Hollingsworth III, Maya Matlin, Tristan Milligan, Goldi Nahir, Zig Novak, Zoe Rivas

Future graduates

- Twelfth grade: Yael Baron, Frankie Hollingsworth, Hunter Hollingsworth, Vijay Maraj, Baaz Nahir, Lola Pacini, Shay Powers, Saad Al' Maliki, Rasha Zuabi, Esme Song
- Ninth grade: Abra Al' Maliki

Honorary graduates

- Kevin Smith

Left before graduation

- Terri McGreggor – (transferred to private school before season 4)
- Jay Hogart – (expelled in season 4)
- Craig Manning – (dropped out in season 5 to pursue career in music)
- Sean Cameron – (expelled in season 6, returns in season 7, only to leave to join the army)
- Ashley Kerwin – (dropped out in season 7 to pursue career in music)
- Darcy Edwards – (left to do charity work in Kenya in season 8, it is unclear when she returned)
- Derek Haig – (left before season 9, it is unclear what happened to him)
- Mia Jones – (left in season 9 to become a model in Paris)
- Bruce the Moose – (shy credits in season 9, it is unclear what happened to him)
- Blue Chessex – (left before season 10, it is unclear what happened to him)
- Declan Coyne – (transferred to a private school in season 10)
- Leia Chang - (left before the second-half of season 10, it is unclear what happened to her)
- Wesley Betenkamp - (left before season 12, it is unclear what happened to him)
- K.C. Guthrie - (moved to avoid his abusive father in season 12)
- Tori Santamaria - (moved before season 13)
- Dave Turner - (left before the second half of season 13, it is unclear what happened to him)
- Luke Baker - (arrested for the rape of Zoe Rivas in season 13)
- Jack Jones - (left before season 1 of Degrassi: Next Class, it is unclear what happened to her)

Died while attending Degrassi

- Claude Tanner – committed suicide in the boys bathroom after becoming despondent when Caitlin refused to go out with him in Degrassi High season 2. His body was discovered by Snake.
- Rick Murray – shot and critically injured fellow student Jimmy Brooks. Was shot and killed by Sean Cameron while struggling to wrestle Rick's gun away in season 4.
- J.T. Yorke – fatally stabbed by Lakehurst student Drake Lempkey in season 6.
- Campbell Saunders – committed suicide in season 12.
- Adam Torres – died in an auto accident after texting while driving in season 13.

==== Notable alumni ====
- Ashley Kerwin – musician
- Caitlin Ryan – reporter, television show host
- Craig Manning – musician
- Manny Santos – actress
- Mia Jones – model
- Toby Isaacs – game show host

=== Websites ===
- MyRoomPage – Blogs, similar to MySpace (season 6)
- FaceRange – Similar to Facebook (season 8)
- ChatSoFast – Similar to Chatroulette (season 10)
- Twitter – (season 12–13)
- Hastygram – Similar to Instagram (season 13)
- Oomfchat – Similar to Snapchat (season 14)
- Teendr – Similar to Tinder (DNC season 2)
- YouTube – (DNC season 3)

== Sources ==
- Ellis, Kathryn (2005). The official 411 Degrassi generations. Fenn Pub. Co. ISBN 1-55168-278-8. OCLC 59136593.
