= Stacey Farber =

Canadian actress (born 1987)

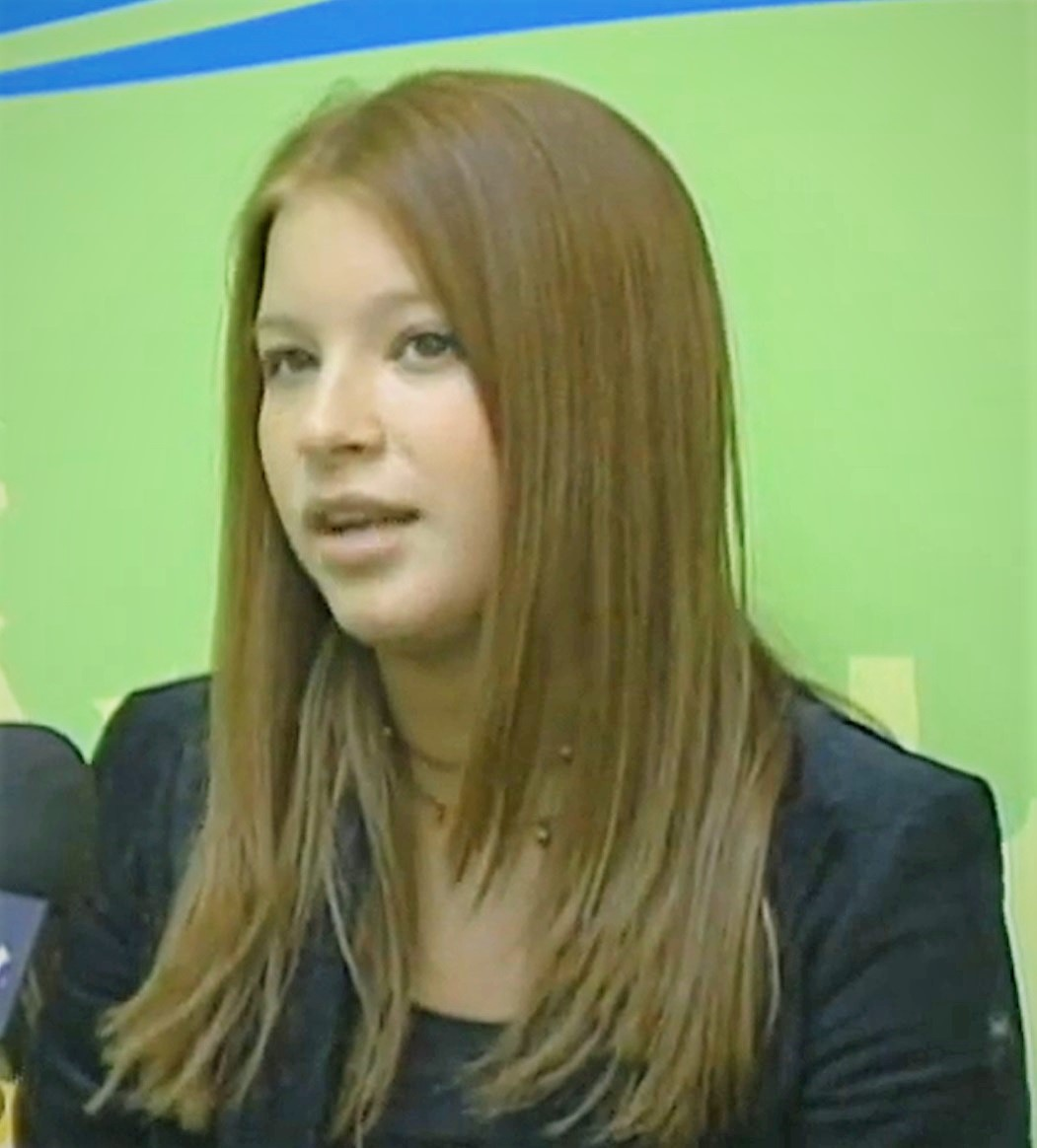
- Stacey Farber (2004; age 17)
- Born: August 25, 1987 (age 39); Toronto, Ontario, Canada
- Education: The New School (Eugene Lang College division)
- Occupation: Actress
- Years active: 2002–present

Stacey Farber (born August 25, 1987) is a Canadian actress. After making an uncredited appearance in season 1, Farber played Ellie Nash in seasons 2 through 8 of the television series Degrassi: The Next Generation. From 2010 to 2011, Farber starred in the CBC series 18 to Life. From 2014 to 2017, Farber played Sydney Katz on the Canadian medical drama Saving Hope. Since 2023, Farber has had a lead role on The Spencer Sisters. Farber has also appeared multiple times on the Netflix drama series Virgin River, as well as The CW superhero series Superman & Lois.

== Early life and education ==
On August 25, 1987 (39 years ago), Farber was born in Toronto, Ontario, Canada to a Jewish family.

In 2005, at the age of 17, Farber graduated from the all-girls private school Branksome Hall. She completed her first year of university at York University in Toronto in 2007, then transferred to The New School's Eugene Lang College in New York City, graduating in 2009.

== Career ==
In her role as Ellie Nash on Degrassi: The Next Generation, Farber plays a troubled girl who has problems with depression and cutting, while dealing with an alcoholic mother. She started off as a recurring character in the show's second season, but was promoted to a regular role in the third season and continued until the end of season seven. For her work on Degrassi, she was nominated for Canada's top acting award, a Gemini Award, in the category 'Best Performance in a Youth Program or Series'.

In addition to playing Ellie in Degrassi, Farber also appeared in the Canadian short film Bagatelle (2001). She played Young Kathryn in the crime film Narc (2002), guest-starred as Lacy Sanders on an episode of the television drama Doc, and guest hosted the 2004–05 season finale of The N's Best Friend's Date. She also played Mary in the animated science fiction series Dark Oracle. She appeared as herself in Instant Star, and in 2006 had a mini-series on The N's The Click, Stacey's NYC 101.

In addition to her screen work, Farber has appeared in various stage productions, including Love, Loss and What I Wore.

From 2010 to 2011, Farber starred in 18 to Life with Michael Seater. The CBC/CW series featured Seater marrying literal girl-next-door Farber at age 18, against both sets of parents' wishes. The pilot was actually filmed in 2008 in Montreal, with the further eleven episodes filmed in summer 2010. Critic Raju Mudhar wrote in the Toronto Star that the series had an "almost Juno-like quality". While disliking the series, he suggested the leads have "some chemistry and both are compelling, young actors to watch." The two were described as "getting along famously" in real life, having met only for the TV movie Degrassi Goes Hollywood. Farber's mother on the series was played by Angela Asher, who appeared with Farber before that in Made... The Movie. The series was nominated for a Gemini Award for best ensemble performance.

In October 2020, Farber was cast in the recurring role of Leslie Larr, described as a "hardened, world-worn dream killer", on the CW television series Superman & Lois.

In December 2020, Farber was cast in the recurring role of Tara Anderson in the third season Netflix drama series Virgin River.

In 2025-2026, Farber guest-starred in multiple episodes of Brilliant Minds as "Michelle", the ex-wife of Dr. Vance "Van" Markus (Alex MacNicoll), a neurology intern who works under Dr. Oliver Wolf (Zachary Quinto), and who exhibits mirror-touch synesthesia. Her character is a social worker who helps Dr. Wolf's neurology team with a number of difficult cases, while rediscovering her connection with Dr. Markus.

== Filmography ==
=== Film ===
Year	Title	Role	Notes
2001	Games at Four		Short film
2001	Bagatelle		Short film
2002	Narc	Young Kathryn	
2006	Orpheus	Petty	Television film
2006	Booky Makes Her Mark	Audrey	Television film
2007	King of Sorrow	Des	Television film
2009	Degrassi Goes Hollywood	Eleanor "Ellie" Nash	Television film
2010	Made... The Movie	Emerson	Television film
2015	Take It from Us	Aly	Television film
2016	Flashback	Paige Briar	Television film; also known as Crossfire
2018	The Desecrated	Sabrina Shelby	Short film
2022	Butlers in Love	Emma	Television film
2023	A Season for Family	Maddy	Television film
2024	Hanukkah on the Rocks	Tory	Television film
2026	I'll Be Seeing You	Amy	Television film

=== Television ===
Year	Title	Role	Notes
2002–2009	Degrassi: The Next Generation	Eleanor "Ellie" Nash	Uncredited appearance (season 1); Recurring role (seasons 2, 8); main role (seasons 3–7); 74 episodes
2004	Doc	Lacy Sanders	Episode: "Searching for Bonnie Fisher"
2004	Dark Oracle	Mary	4 episodes
2005–2007	Degrassi: Minis	Eleanor "Ellie" Nash	15 episodes
2007	Degrassi: Doing What Matters	Self	TV special
2010–2011	18 to Life	Jessie Hill	Main role
2010	Flashpoint	Tracey	Episode: "Unconditional Love"
2013	Cult	E.J.	Recurring role; 6 episodes
2013	Satisfaction	Kim	Episode: "Save the Date"
2014	Rookie Blue	Courtney	Episode: "Blink"
2014–2017	Saving Hope	Sydney Katz	Main role (season 3); guest role (seasons 4–5); 16 episodes
2017	The Brave	Cassie Conner	Episode: "Moscow Rules"
2017	Chicago Justice	Kerry Schmidt	Episode: "Drill"
2018	Grace and Frankie	Jo	Episodes: "The Expiration Date", "The Lockdown"
2018	Schitt's Creek	Rachel	Episode: "The Barbecue"
2018	UnREAL	Robin Carr	Episodes: "Confront", "Codependence"
2019	Animal Kingdom	Tasmin	Episodes: "Know Thy Enemy", "SHTF"
2019–2020	Diggstown	Pam MacLean	Main role
2021	Superman & Lois	Irma Sayres / Leslie Larr	Recurring role (season 1); 12 episodes
2021–present	Virgin River	Tara Anderson	Recurring role (season 3–present)
2023	The Spencer Sisters	Darby Spencer	Main role
2025	Law & Order: Special Victims Unit	A.D.A. Camille Rourke	Episode: “Accomplice Liability” (Season 26, Episode 17)
2025–2026	Brilliant Minds	Michelle	6 episodes

=== Music videos ===
Year	Title	Artist	Role
2018	"I'm Upset"	Drake	Self
