= Ryan Cooley =

Canadian actor

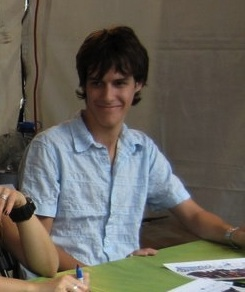
- Cooley in 2007
- Born: Ryan Hadison Cooley; May 18, 1988 (age 38); Orangeville, Ontario, Canada
- Education: University of Toronto
- Occupations: Actor, consultant
- Years active: 1998–2015 (acting)

Ryan Hadison Cooley (born May 18, 1988) is a Canadian consultant and former actor. He is best known for his role as James Tiberius "J.T." Yorke on Degrassi: The Next Generation which he starred in from 2001 until 2007.

He is currently the Vice President of Konrad Group, a digitial agency that creates apps and products.

== Early life ==
Cooley was born in Orangeville, Ontario to Charles Cooley, a drummer.

== Career ==
Prior to joining the Degrassi cast, he had a two-year run as Pleskit, the alien lead in the television series I Was a Sixth Grade Alien. Cooley's other television credits include the series, Are You Afraid of the Dark?, Queer as Folk, Lexx: The Series and Life with Derek. He has also appeared in the features Sachsenhausen 1944, Toy Men, Disney Channel film The Color of Friendship, the Animal Planet film Cybermutt and CBC television film Happy Christmas Miss King alongside his Degrassi co-star Lauren Collins.

In 2001, Cooley began appearing on Degrassi: The Next Generation as a regular character in the first season of the show and continued until his character's death in 2007, the show’s sixth season. In 2002, Cooley was nominated for a Young Artist Award (LA) for Best Performance in a TV Comedy Series for the show.

Cooley has also appeared in the 2007 film The Tracey Fragments with Elliot Page. (Note: Credited as Ellen Page)

In 2012, Cooley guest starred in a YouTube miniseries Millie and Midge, in episodes 2 and 4 as Parker.

Cooley was to appear in former co-star Drake's 2018 music video for the single "I'm Upset," however he declined due to believing it was a scam. The video was set around a Degrassi reunion.

== Personal life ==
Following his departure from Degrassi, Cooley took a break from acting and attended the University of Toronto where he studied theatre.

== Filmography ==
=== Film ===
Year	Title	Role	Notes
1998	After	Johnathan Madison	Short
1998	Happy Christmas, Miss King	Daniel King	Television film
2000	The Color of Friendship	Billy	Television film
2003	Cybermutt	Nino	
2005	God's Goodness	Mike	Short
2007	The Tracey Fragments	David Goldberg	

=== Television ===
Year	Title	Role	Notes
1999	Real Kids, Real Adventures	Bud Toole	Episode: "Amy to the Rescue: The Amy Toole Story"
1999–2001	I Was a Sixth Grade Alien	Pleskit	Main role
2000	Are You Afraid of the Dark?	Waif Kid	3 episodes
2001	Queer as Folk	Hank Cameron	Recurring role
2001	Lexx	Digby	3 episodes
2001–2007	Degrassi: The Next Generation	J.T. Yorke	Main role
2005	Life with Derek	Frank	Episode: "The Poxfather"
2010	The Dating Guy	Booyah's son	Voice, episode: "Weekend at Booyah's"
2012	Lost Girl	Website Owner	Episode: "Midnight Lamp"
2013–2015	Oh No! It's an Alien Invasion	Louis	Voice, main role
2014	BeyWarriors: BeyRaiderz	Task Landau	Voice, main role

== Awards and nominations ==
Year	Award	Category	Nominated work	Result	Ref.
2002	Young Artist Awards	Best Ensemble in a TV Series (Comedy or Drama)	Degrassi: The Next Generation	Won	
2002	Young Artist Awards	Best Performance in a TV Comedy Series - Leading Young Actor	Degrassi: The Next Generation	Nominated	
2003	Young Artist Awards	Best Ensemble in a TV Series (Comedy or Drama)	Degrassi: The Next Generation	Nominated	
2005	Young Artist Awards	Outstanding Young Performers in a TV Series	Degrassi: The Next Generation	Nominated	
2006	Young Artist Awards	Best Young Ensemble in a TV Series (Comedy or Drama)	Degrassi: The Next Generation	Nominated	
