= Jake Goldsbie =

Canadian actor (born 1988)

- Born: Jacob Benjamin Goldsbie; August 8, 1988 (age 38); Toronto, Ontario, Canada
- Education: Concordia University
- Occupation: Actor
- Years active: 1995–present

Jacob Benjamin Goldsbie (born August 8, 1988) is a Canadian film, television, and stage actor, who is best known for portraying Toby Isaacs in the CTV television series Degrassi: The Next Generation from 2001 until 2009.

== Early life ==
Goldsbie was born in Toronto, the second of three sons to Susie (née Waldman) and Todd Goldsbie. His family is Jewish. He graduated from Concordia University in Montreal where he studied communications and journalism.

== Career ==
Goldsbie made his acting debut in an episode of The Hardy Boys as Max. He went on to play a few smaller television roles, before landing a leading voice role in Corduroy as Marty. He would also play significant voice roles in Redwall, Pecola and Rolie Polie Olie.

He made his film debut in 1999, in the children's adaption of Jacob Two Two Meets the Hooded Fangs.

In 2001, Goldsbie gained wide recognition for portraying Toby Isaacs on Degrassi: The Next Generation, although he originally auditioned for the role of J.T. Yorke. He would stay on the show until his departure in 2009. He reunited with the cast in 2018 for former co-star Drake's "I'm Upset" music video, which takes place during a Degrassi reunion.

In the early 2010s, Goldsbie worked at The Score (now known as Sportsnet 360) where he wrote and hosted podcasts about professional sports.

In 2018, he starred on stage in Harold Green Jewish Theatre Company's production of Bad Jews as Jonah.

In 2023, he portrayed Brett in a stage production of Norm Foster's Moving In.

== Filmography ==
=== Film ===
Year	Title	Role	Notes
1999	Jacob Two Two Meets the Hooded Fangs	Oscar	
2002	Rolie Polie Olie: The Great Defender of Fun	Junior Littlegreen	Voice
2003	William Joyce's Rolie Polie Olie: The Baby Bot Chase	Junior Littlegreen	Voice
2004	Childstar	First Son	
2017	Molly's Game	LA Player	

=== Television ===
Year	Title	Role	Notes
1995	The Hardy Boys	Max	Episode: "Telling Lies"
1996	Critical Choices	Jonah	Television movie
1998	Rescuers: Stories of Courage: Two Couples	Abraham / Albert	Television movie
1998	Franklin	Possum	Voice
1998	Noddy	Grit	2 episodes
1999	Black and Blue	Bennie Castro	Television movie
1999	Twice in a Lifetime	Mickey	Episode: "Blood Brothers"
2000	Corduroy	Marty	Voice; 16 episodes
2000	When Andrew Came Home	Carl Rudnick	Television movie
2000–2001	Redwall	Vitch / Hedgehog Slave	Voice; 13 episodes
2001	Laughter on the 23rd Floor	Pauly	Television movie
2001	Prince Charming	Boy	Television movie
2001	The Kid	Earl	Voice; Television movie
2001	The Santa Claus Brothers	Additional voices	Voice; Television movie
2001–2002	Pecola	Rudy	12 episodes; English dubbing
2001–2004	Rolie Polie Olie	Junior Littlegreen	Voice; 4 episodes
2001–2009	Degrassi: The Next Generation	Toby Isaacs	Main character; 120 episodes
2001	Leap Years	Tyler – Age 11	2 episodes
2001	Anne of Green Gables: The Animated Series	McGuffin Boy	Voice; Episode "The Stray"
2002	Marvin the Tap-Dancing Horse	Andrew	2 episodes
2002	The Red Sneakers	Boy	Television movie
2003	My Dad the Rock Star	Student #1	Voice; Episode: "Mr. Zilla's Opus"
2005	I Do, They Don't	Miles	Television movie
2005	Twitches	Teen Trick or Treater	Television movie
2006–2007	Degrassi: Minis	Toby Isaacs	10 episodes
2009	Being Erica	Beezer	Episode: "Battle Royale"
2018	Falling Water	Medical Tech	Episode: "Watchers"
2020	Mrs. America	Producer	Episode: "Gloria"
2020	Private Eyes	Baggage Handler	Episode: "The P.I. Vanishes"
2022	Five Days at Memorial	Doctor	Episode: "45 Dead"

=== Music videos ===
Year	Title	Artist
2018	"I'm Upset"	Drake

== On stage ==
Year	Title	Role	Director	Venue	Ref.
2018	Bad Jews	Jonah	Lisa Rubin	Greenwin Theatre	
2023	Moving In	Brett	Jessie Collins	Upper Canada Playhouse	

== Awards and nominations ==
Year	Awards	Category	Nominated work	Result	Ref.
2002	Young Artist Awards	Best Ensemble in a TV Series (Comedy or Drama	Degrassi: The Next Generation	Won	
2002	Young Artist Awards	Best Performance in a TV Comedy Series – Leading Young Actor	Degrassi: The Next Generation	Nominated	
2003	Young Artist Awards	Best Ensemble in a TV Series (Comedy or Drama	Degrassi: The Next Generation	Nominated	
2003	Young Artist Awards	Best Performance in a TV Movie, Mini-Series, or Special – Leading Young Actore	The Red Sneakers	Nominated	
2006	Young Artist Awards	Best Young Ensemble Performance in a TV Series (Comedy or Drama)	Degrassi: The Next Generation	Nominated	
