= J.T. Yorke =

Fictional character on Degrassi: The Next Generation

J. T. Yorke
- Publicity photograph of J.T. Yorke from the third season of Degrassi: The Next Generation.
- First appearance: October 14, 2001 (episode 1.01; "Mother and Child Reunion, Part 1")
- Last appearance: January 26, 2007 (episode 6.11; "Rock This Town")
- Created by: Linda Schuyler and Yan Moore
- Portrayed by: Ryan Cooley

In-universe information
- Full name: James Tiberius Yorke
- Nickname: J. T. Mascot boy
- Occupation: Student
- Family: Unnamed parents Unnamed brother Unnamed sister Unnamed grandmother Unnamed son (with Liberty)
- Nationality: Canadian

James Tiberius "J.T." Yorke is a fictional character from the Canadian teen drama series Degrassi: The Next Generation. He was portrayed by Ryan Cooley. He debuted in the first episode of the series and appeared throughout its first six seasons. His role throughout Degrassi: The Next Generation primarily concerns his friendship with Toby Issacs (Jake Goldsbie), his relationship with Liberty Van Zandt (Sarah Barrable-Tishauer), and his later brief relationship with Mia Jones (Nina Dobrev). In the show's fifth season, Liberty becomes pregnant after the two become sexually active, with Liberty ultimately deciding to put the baby up for adoption. He then begins to date Mia by the sixth season, but has second thoughts about Liberty. Before he is able to rekindle his relationship with Liberty, he is stabbed to death by Drake Lempkey, a student from rival school Lakehurst, puncturing his aorta and killing him. His death causes tensions between Degrassi and Lakehurst, which are exacerbated by the latter's students being moved to Degrassi in the seventh season.

One of the show's most popular characters, J. T. Yorke's death drew a massive outcry from fans of the series, with many posting "YouTube memorials" about the character.

== Development ==
Jake Goldsbie originally auditioned for the role, but was cast as Toby Isaacs. The character was named after show writer Brendon Yorke.

Ryan Cooley discovered that he was leaving the series in April 2006, shortly before filming commenced on the sixth season. While admitting that he was surprised at the death of his character, Cooley had already been contemplating leaving the series to concentrate on his university studies. Cooley's last episode was "Rock This Town" where his character was stabbed. The episode was recorded in August 2006 and aired in January 2007.

== Characterization ==
Throughout the series, J. T. is portrayed as a class clown whose joking often draws accusations of immaturity, including from Liberty and Manny Santos, who he briefly dated in the fourth season. Despite his humorous attitude, he is shown to be very supportive, staying with Liberty during her pregnancy, and defending Paige Michalchuk (Lauren Collins) following her rape.

== Role in Degrassi: The Next Generation ==
=== Season 1 ===
J. T. aids Manny and Toby in stopping Emma from being raped during a meeting with a sexual predator who posed as someone her age. When his seventh grade year started, J. T. was asked by Toby to run against his stepsister Ashley Kerwin for class president and he did so before Ashley paid him eighty dollars to withdraw. Early in the school year, J. T. and Toby passed on going to the school dance in favor of looking at pornography websites. The two were caught by Toby's parents, who returned home earlier than expected and the pair were made by Toby's parents to look at pornography sites with men, in order to be taught a lesson on objectifying women.

Liberty is revealed to be romantically interested in J. T., who does not feel the same about her. After she takes the blame for him during class, her crush becomes obvious to Toby, Manny and Emma. At first, J. T. denies it, then tries to act obnoxious to get her to reject him. When this also fails, he tells her that he is homosexual, which disappoints her but backfires when she asks to do an interview with him and have him come out of the closet and serve as an inspiration for other students struggling with coming to terms with their sexuality. When Emma has her period, J. T. mocks her for coming to class in oversized shorts, not knowing her other clothes were stained. He finds out when she reveals she is having her period to the class.

=== Season 2 ===
J. T. has a crush on Paige, who is raped sometime after the two go on a date together. When she tells him about the rape and the identity of the offender, J.T. attacks the rapist despite being outclassed. When the rapist retaliates, he is suspended.

=== Season 3 ===
J. T. changes his appearance from the previous two seasons, abandoning his cap and growing out his hair. He also becomes attracted to childhood friend Manny Santos, who begins to dress more promiscuously. He stops her from exposing herself to the class when she volunteers and has to bend over as a result. When Liberty asks him out, after having had a crush on him for years, J. T. rejects her. She asks him if he is rejecting her because of his feelings for Manny.

J. T. is featured in a commercial. In anticipation of its premiere, he invites students from Degrassi, including Manny, the only one to not laugh at the commercial. Even after Sean and Jay mock him for his role in the commercial, she gives him a positive reception and the pair become friends again. He decides to ask her to a dance, but backs out after seeing her with Craig, who had previously gotten her pregnant. When Manny confronts him about not asking her out, he admits that he chose not to when he saw her with him. Manny reveals that Craig wanted to see how she was doing since the abortion. The following day, J. T. apologizes to Manny and asks her out, which she accepts.

=== Season 4 ===
Early in the season, his relationship with Manny ends after she catches him trying to use a penis pump to make his penis bigger after seeing Craig Manning's, which made him feel his was too small. Manny said that she was turned off by J. T.'s constant joking. He becomes good friends with Liberty's younger brother Danny Van Zandt and the pair shun Toby for being friends with Rick Murray, perpetrator of the school shooting. After he is confronted by Manny, J. T. makes up with Toby and apologizes for treating him badly. J. T. and Danny had previously expressed dislike for Rick before the shooting and his death.

J. T. and Liberty bond while working on a school play based on Dracula. When Liberty sings their rebellion song to the school principal, the pair end up in detention, where they share their first kiss and begin a relationship. The friendship between J. T. and Danny deteriorates after Danny realizes that J. T. is more interested in being with his sister than being friends with him. After Danny deliberately gets the two in trouble, he gets into a fight with J. T., but later makes up for it by covering for the two when his father comes home.

=== Season 5 ===
J. T. and Liberty become sexually active over the summer and he speaks openly of his relations with her to Toby, frustrating Liberty. She pours a cup of soda down J. T.'s pants after hearing him talk to Toby and leaves. The following day, J. T. and Liberty argue over his immaturity and her controlling ways before she reveals she's pregnant, causing a surprised J. T. to crash his car. J. T. breaks up with Liberty after she continues to ignore his pleas for her to go to the doctor, but he gets a job at a pharmacy and swears to not abandon his unborn child. Danny learns of the pregnancy soon after and attacks J. T. and promises not to tell as long as the latter helps him with an assignment taking care of a baby doll. After the project fails, Danny still chooses not to tell his parents about his sister and J. T.'s secret. J. T. and Liberty argue a bit on whether to keep the baby or put it up for adoption, but ultimately decide to keep the baby. As a result, J. T. quits the job he loves at a children's TV show to pick up more hours at the pharmacy.

Jay Hogart persuades J. T. to steal Oxycodone from the pharmacy and sell it to a friend of Jay's at the Ravine. J. T. tells the buyer that he needs more cash, so the buyer agrees to give J. T. an extra $400 as a payment on another score of drugs. When Liberty finds out about J. T.'s drug-dealing, she is infuriated and J. T. begins to regret his decision. He tells Liberty he will buy back the drugs from his buyer and never sell again. Meanwhile, he and Liberty decide it's time to tell their parents. J. T.'s grandmother doesn't take it well, which makes them both nervous about Liberty's parents' reactions. Liberty's mother is relatively calm, but Liberty's father becomes angry and states he never wants to see J. T. again, but that they will help Liberty. Liberty tells her parents that she plans to move in with J. T., storms out of the room, and loudly tells J. T. to help her begin to pack.

J. T. asks Toby for financial help in order to buy back the drugs, but Toby refuses. When J. T. confronts the buyer about getting the drugs back, they get in a physical fight. Since the buyer still wants the drugs, J. T. again steals them from the pharmacy, which upsets Liberty. J. T. realizes he has lost everything he cares about and attempts suicide by taking all of the unsold pills. He collapses because of the overdose and is next seen awake in a hospital bed. It is assumed that Jay Hogart brought J. T. to the hospital. Liberty's father, an attorney, tells her he will try to help J. T. out of legal trouble. Liberty tells J.T. she has decided to give up their baby for adoption because neither of them can handle raising a child. Liberty has her child later in the season. J. T. sees the infant briefly.

=== Season 6 ===
J. T. becomes frustrated with the attacks on Degrassi students by students of rival school Lakehurst. He begins a relationship with Mia Jones, who had previously been in a relationship with a Lakehurst student. While at Liberty's birthday party, he goes to look for her in order to tell her that he still has feelings for her. As he is looking for Liberty, he encounters two Lakehurst students named Johnny DiMarco and Drake Lempkey vandalizing his car. After he jokes about them thinking his car "sucks", Drake stabs him to death as his back is turned. Liberty finds J.T. just after he is stabbed and she calls for help. J.T. is rushed to the hospital, and soon pronounced dead, with the original grade 7 class (Emma, Manny, Liberty, Sean, and Toby) at the hospital grieving his death.

=== Season 7 ===
A memorial with his picture is shown in the finale "We Built This City." At graduation, his friends honor his memory by flipping the tassel on the graduation cap reserved for him.

== Impact ==
J.T.'s death sparked a massive fan outcry. Pilot Viruet of The A.V. Club noted that the character's death had such an impact that the show was "basically divided between pre- and post-J.T.'s death". When asked why Cooley did not appear in the music video for "I'm Upset", musician Drake, who starred in the series as Jimmy Brooks, claimed that Cooley thought it was a "scam".
