= Miriam McDonald =

Canadian actress (born 1987)

- Born: Miriam Katherine McDonald; July 26, 1987 (age 39); Oakville, Ontario, Canada
- Occupation: Actress
- Years active: 1998–present

Miriam Katherine McDonald (born July 26, 1987) is a Canadian actress best known for playing the lead role Emma Nelson on the Canadian television series Degrassi: The Next Generation.

== Early life ==
McDonald was born in Oakville, Ontario to Silvia (née Pauksens), who is of Latvian descent, and John McDonald. She had an older sister Esther, who died from an eating disorder in 2013.

== Career ==
McDonald focused on acting, playing a role in the series, System Crash, in 1999. McDonald found a job as a voiceover actress after she was cast in 2001 in John Kricfalusi's series The Ripping Friends. She has done a total of 39 characters.

In 2001, she was cast as Emma Nelson, daughter of Christine 'Spike' Nelson, in the CTV/The N drama Degrassi: The Next Generation, a spin-off of the successful Degrassi series. She starred in the first nine series and three Degrassi television films. In 2016, she reprised the role for an episode in Degrassi: Next Class. She was also cast as Emma Jackson in the successful CTV show, Agent Wars, alongside Christopher J. Alexander, who played the main character, Christian.

In 2004, she played Dawn Gensler in the Lifetime made-for-television movie She's Too Young. She also had a guest role on the Family Channel show Naturally, Sadie as Heidi.

In 2008, she played Danielle "Daisy" Brooks in the made-for-TV erotic-thriller movie, Poison Ivy: The Secret Society.

In 2013, she played two roles in Lost Girl and also made an appearance in Orphan Black.

In 2018, McDonald appeared in Drake's music video for "I'm Upset", which took place during a Degrassi reunion.

== Personal life ==
McDonald is also a dancer and yoga instructor, and has worked as a real estate agent. Like her sister, McDonald also struggled with an eating disorder "in the beginning seasons" of Degrassi. She says Degrassi fans often relate the most to her character Emma's eating disorder episodes, which "were so hard for [her]" to film. Despite her sister's death, McDonald says she shares her perspective because "I know there are so many people that are dealing with it and don't realize how bad it can get and don't realize how good it can get if you can just conquer it."

== Filmography ==
=== Film ===
Year	Title	Role	Notes
2007	The Poet	Willa	AKA Hearts of War
2014	Wolves	Haley	
2021	The Love Prank	Sabrina	Short film

=== Television ===
Year	Title	Role	Notes
1999	System Crash		TV series
2001–2002	Pecola	Chewy	Main voice role; English version
2001–2009	Degrassi: The Next Generation	Emma Nelson	Main role (seasons 1–9), 138 episodes
2004	Blue Murder	Lucy Wentworth	Episode: "Boarders"
2007	Naturally, Sadie	Heidi	Episode: "As Bad as It Gets"
2007	Devil's Diary	Heather	Television film
2008	Sea Beast	Carly McKenna	Television film
2008	Poison Ivy: The Secret Society	Danielle "Daisy" Brooks	Television film
2008	Degrassi Spring Break Movie	Emma Nelson	Television film
2009	Degrassi Goes Hollywood	Emma Nelson	Television film
2010	Degrassi Takes Manhattan	Emma Nelson	Television film
2012	XIII: The Series	Sasha	Episode: "Gauntlet"
2013	Lost Girl	Hot Fae / Anita	Episodes: "Faes Wide Shut", "Adventures in Fae-bysitting"
2013	Orphan Black	Madison	Episode: "Conditions of Existence"
2016	Degrassi: Next Class	Emma Nelson	Episode: "#ThrowBackThursday"
2018	A Veteran's Christmas	Marnie Radcliffe	Television film
2020	Letters to Satan Claus	Mayor Danica Bells	Television film

=== Music videos ===
Year	Title	Artist
2018	"I'm Upset"	Drake

=== Web series ===
Year	Title	Artist	Notes
2005–2008	Degrassi: Minis	Emma Nelson	17 episodes

== Awards and nominations ==
Year	Award	Category	Nominated work	Result	Notes	Ref.
2002	Young Artist Awards	Best Ensemble in a TV Series (Comedy or Drama)	Degrassi: The Next Generation	Won		
2003	Young Artist Awards	Best Ensemble in a TV Series (Comedy or Drama)	Degrassi: The Next Generation	Nominated		
2005	Young Artist Awards	Outstanding Young Performers in a TV Series	Degrassi: The Next Generation	Nominated		
2005	Young Artist Awards	Best Performance in a TV Movie, Miniseries, or Special – Supporting Young Actress	She's Too Young	Nominated		
2006	Young Artist Awards	Best Young Ensemble Performance in a TV Series (Comedy or Drama)	Degrassi: The Next Generation	Nominated		
