= Linlyn Lue =

Canadian actress

Linlyn Lue is a Canadian actress.

== Early life ==
Lue was born in Jamaica and came to Canada with her family as a child.

== Career ==
Lue played the strict English teacher Ms. Kwan on the Canadian television show Degrassi: The Next Generation for nine seasons. She also appeared in the films Black Robe, Blindness, Total Recall and the television series Strong Medicine and Doc.

== Filmography ==
=== Film ===
Year	Title	Role	Notes
1991	Black Robe	She Manitou	
1994	Boulevard	ICU Nurse	
1998	Short for Nothing	Lady 3	
2000	Ordeals of Love on the Great Lakes	Kim Lee	
2008	Blindness	Emissary from Ward Two	
2010	You Are Here	Red Eye Vox Pop	
2012	Total Recall	Total Recall	

=== Television ===
Year	Title	Role	Notes
1999	Half a Dozen Babies	Nurse Susan	Television film
1999	Twice in a Lifetime	Young Police Woman	Episode: "Double Exposure"
1999	Exhibit A: Secrets of Forensic Science	Alison's Coach	Episode: "Killer in a Box"
1999	Deep in the City	Manjit	Episode: "Fire in the Garden"
2000	Strong Medicine	Nurse #1	Episode: "Pilot"
2001	Doc	Admitting Clerk	Episode: "All in a Day's Work"
2001–2009	Degrassi: The Next Generation	Ms. Laura Kwan	58 episodes
2003	Ice Bound	Sarah Kemp	Television film
2003	1-800-Missing	Nancy	Episode: "Thin Air"
2007	72 Hours: True Crime	Victim #2	Episode: "Predator"
2007, 2014	Air Crash Investigation	Laura Kayama	2 episodes
2008	The Summit	Irene Babiak	2 episodes
2010	Bloodletting & Miraculous Cures	Herbalist	Episode: "Family Practice"
2010	Flashpoint	Alix	Episode: "Unconditional Love"
2011	Alphas	Mom With Stroller	Episode: "Pilot"
2011	Dan for Mayor	Japanese Businesswoman	Episode: "Old Fort Wessex"
2015	The Adventures of Napkin Man!	Ahmet's Mom	Episode: "Play the Day Away"
