= Degrassi Junior High season 1 =

Season of Degrassi Junior High

Degrassi Junior High
- Season 1
- Region 1 DVD cover
- No. of episodes: 13

Release
- Original network: CBC Television
- Original release: January 18 – May 3, 1987

Season chronology
- Next → Season 2

The first season of Degrassi Junior High, a Canadian teen drama television series, aired in Canada from January 18, 1987, to May 3, 1987, consisting of thirteen episodes. The series follows the lives of a group of seventh and eighth grade school children attending the titular school as they face various issues and challenges such as child abuse, homophobia, teenage pregnancy, and body image. Filming for the season began on 8–10 July 1986 in Etobicoke, Ontario and wrapped in the winter of 1986.

The first season was broadcast on CBC Television on Sundays at 5:00pm. In the United States, the first season commenced airing on September 26, 1987, on PBS. In the United States, the first two seasons of the series were aired together as one twenty-six episode season. The season was released to DVD by WGBH Boston Home Video on February 1, 2005, in the United States, and by Force Entertainment on October 1, 2005, in Australia.

The season received a positive reception from critics, who acclaimed it as a realistic portrayal of teenagers that contrasted heavily with more moralistic, family-oriented programs of the time period. The episode "It's Late", where character Christine "Spike" Nelson becomes pregnant, would win an International Emmy for Children & Young People in November 1987. On the BBC in the United Kingdom, several episodes, including "It's Late", and "Rumour Has It", an episode about rumours of a teacher's homosexuality, were aired only in an older-aimed slot later than the rest of the series, with the network ultimately not airing its second and third seasons.

== Production ==
Schoolteacher Linda Schuyler and her partner Kit Hood founded the company Playing With Time, Inc. in 1976, to produce short films and documentaries. In the late 1970s and early 1980s, Playing With Time produced a series of annual short films for CBC Television, beginning with 1979's Ida Makes a Movie, that implored the network to order a television series, which became known as The Kids of Degrassi Street. The series won several accolades during its run, including an International Emmy in 1986. Work on a series centering on a junior high school began in the early months of that year.

Auditions took place throughout schools in Toronto; an estimated 300 kids auditioned and fifty-four were selected. The selected fifty-four would undergo a three-week workshop, that took place from 26 May to 13 June 1986, which helped them learn basic acting skills, techniques and improvisation and also included seminars in the behind-the-scenes aspects of production. The workshops would be repeated at the beginning of production for each season, as new cast members joined, and existing cast members underwent more advanced workshops. Characters would be developed based on the strengths of the actors and those who did exceptionally well would be given bigger roles. The actors comprised The Playing With Time Repertory Company which at its peak consisted of sixty-five kids. According to actress Stacie Mistysyn, who had previously starred on Kids as Lisa Canard and would return as Caitlin Ryan, the actors of Kids were offered a choice between playing new characters, or reprising their original roles; all except one actor chose to play new characters.

Schuyler and Hood saw Degrassi Junior High as a response to what they felt was a lack of television series that properly depicted teenagers, with the pair as well as critics citing family-oriented moralistic shows. Furthermore, Schuyler expressed dissatisfaction at the practice of casting older people to play teenagers prevalent in American teen media, and sought to cast real, inexperienced teenagers instead.

== Broadcast ==
=== Canada ===
Degrassi Junior High premiered on January 18, 1987, on CBC, airing at 5:00pm on Sundays. Critics who praised the show criticized the timeslot, feeling that the show deserved higher visibility. As a result, the series was moved to Mondays at 7:30pm, and then later a prime time slot at 8:30pm at the behest of Ivan Fecan, then the programming chief of CBC, who greatly acclaimed the series and wished he had "20 more shows like it". Re-runs of the first season began airing in the Monday 8:30pm slot on September 28, 1987, until the premiere of the second season.

=== International ===
In the United States, the Public Broadcasting Service (PBS) debuted the series on September 26, 1987, airing at 7:00pm on Saturdays. It debuted on WNET in New York City four days earlier, on September 22, airing at 6:00pm on Tuesdays. Both the first and second seasons were combined into one 26-episode season for the American market. In the United Kingdom, the show debuted BBC One at 5:05pm on April 5, 1988, airing on Wednesdays. However, several of its episodes, including "It's Late" (in which Spike finds out she is pregnant) and "Rumour Has It" (in which Caitlin questions her sexuality) were not aired on BBC One after parents allegedly complained that their content was "too strong" for children, and were instead aired at a 6pm timeslot on the BBC Two's DEF II programming strand. Ultimately, the second and third seasons were not aired in the United Kingdom, although actress Amanda Stepto would make promotional appearances in the UK in 1988 to promote the home video releases of the initially withheld episodes. In Australia, the first season debuted on ABC TV on 8 February 1988, as part of The Afternoon Show hosted by James Valentine, where it aired on Mondays at 5:00pm.

== Critical reception ==
The first season was positively received by critics, who hailed it as a refreshingly realistic portrayal of teenage youth in contrast to other programs of the time. Critics felt that the series had successfully addressed adolescent issues while avoiding the "preachiness" of other socially-conscious television series, while also noting its balance of comedy with drama. Writing for the Times Colonist, Robert James said that Degrassi "is a place where there are no TV super dads, just a bunch of kids coping with the problems of growing up". Andrew Mickel of Den of Geek, reviewing its UK DVD release in 2007, rated it four out of five stars, stated that the show "more than holds up after twenty years" and said that despite the newer series addressing "harder-hitting" issues, the lengths the producers went for the original series made it "much more of a labour of love".

== Episodes ==
No. overall	No. in season	Title	Directed by	Written by	Original release date	Prod. code
1	1	"Kiss Me, Steph"	Kit Hood	Yan Moore	January 18, 1987	101
Stephanie Kaye (Nicole Stoffman) lets the male population of Degrassi Junior High School kiss her as part of her campaign for school president, much to the chagrin of her friend Voula Grivogiannis (Niki Kemeny). Meanwhile, her brother Arthur Kobalewscuy (Duncan Waugh) and Yick Yu (Siluck Saysanasy), both new grade seven students, evade the bullying of Joey Jeremiah (Pat Mastroianni).
2	2	"The Big Dance"	Kit Hood	Avrum Jacobson	January 25, 1987	102
Voula's conservative father refuses to let her go to the upcoming school dance. Disgruntled, Voula decides to go to the dance anyway without telling her father. Stephanie, who agreed to make a speech for a foster child charity that was sponsoring the school dance, becomes heavily intoxicated after drinking booze at Lucy Fernandez's (Anais Granofsky) house, leaving Voula to do the speech herself, just when her father arrives.
3	3	"The Experiment"	Clarke Mackey	Avrum Jacobson	February 1, 1987	103
Yick Yu (Siluck Saysanasy) is convinced that Mr. Raditch (Dan Woods) is biased against him. Aided by Arthur, Yick decides to test Raditch by passing off an old paper of Stephanie's as his own, but the plan fails and the two get detention. Meanwhile, Joey takes advantage of Melanie Brodie (Sara Ballingall) and Kathleen Mead's (Rebecca Haines) interest in taking drugs, by passing off vitamin piles as barbiturates.
4	4	"The Cover-Up"	Kit Hood	John Oughton; Jan Moore	February 8, 1987	104
Joey is offered a new jacket by Rick Munro (Craig Driscoll), the "tough kid" of the school, after Joey's parents accidentally cut his original. When Joey comes over to Rick's apartment, he finds out that Rick's father is abusive, and tries to covertly seek intervention, which is accidentally mistaken as being for himself. Meanwhile, Caitlin Ryan (Stacie Mistysyn) and Suzie Rivera (Sarah Charlesworth) try to make Rick smile.
5	5	"The Great Race"	Clarke Mackey	Yan Moore	February 15, 1987	105
Melanie, part of the girl's swim team, deals with bullying due to her breast size, as sports representative Jason Cox (Tyson Talbot) expresses sexist attitudes towards the swim team, leading Lorraine "LD" Delacorte (Amanda Cook) to challenge his soccer team to a swim race. Meanwhile, Arthur and Yick notice that everybody is growing taller than them.
6	6	"Rumour Has It"	Kit Hood	Yan Moore	February 22, 1987	106
Caitlin has recurring romantic dreams about Ms. Avery (Michelle Goodeve), who is coincidentally the subject of rumours that she is a lesbian. Caitlin begins to question her own sexuality as a result. Meanwhile, Rick wins one hundred dollars and gives everybody free liqourice, which arouses the suspicion of Arthur and Yick, who think Rick stole Yick's money. NOTE: "Rumor Has It" was not aired by the BBC until it was shown on the DEF II strand on September 12, 1988.
7	7	"The Best Laid Plans"	Kit Hood	Yan Moore	March 1, 1987	107
Arthur and Stephanie's mother has plans for Friday night, which prompt them to make plans of their own while the house is vacant. Arthur plans to show Yick a pornographic movie, while Stephanie plans to invite Wheels over and have sexual intercourse. Wheels seeks his reluctant father's advice, and Joey helps him pick out condoms, but embarrasses him by loudly announcing the brands of condoms in the drug store. When Wheels arrives at Stephanie's house with flowers, he finds himself waiting on the front porch with Stephanie's mother's date, and realizes that it was her mother that sold him the condoms. When her mother catches them out, Arthur's friends arrive wanting to see the porn film. NOTE: "The Best Laid Plans" was not aired by the BBC until it was aired on the DEF II strand on September 19, 1988.
8	8	"Nothing to Fear"	John Bertram	Scott Barrie	March 8, 1987	108
LD's father is hospitalized with angina. While troubled by her father's health episode, she refuses to visit him in the hospital, having a distrust in them after her mother had previously died in one despite being assured she would be okay. In an act of goodwill, Voula and Christine "Spike" Nelson (Amanda Stepto) send flowers to her father, who tells them LD never visited her. When she ultimately decides to visit, she finds her father dressed and about to leave. Meanwhile, the grade sevens lose the school snake.
9	9	"What a Night!"	Kit Hood	Yan Moore	March 22, 1987	109
Stephanie meets TV heartthrob Damon King and lies about her age to go on a date with him. When the situation turns into potential date-rape in Damon's car, Stephanie backs out and reveals her real age. Meanwhile, in a quest for new clothes, Lucy and Voula go to the department store, but Lucy shoplifts, causing the two to be taken to the police station.
10	10	"Smokescreen"	John Bertram	Kathryn Ellis	March 29, 1987	110
Rick joins the environmental action committee with Caitlin, which annoys Kathleen. Rick helps advertise a petition and hand it to a factory, whose boss is apathetic. Later, Kathleen catches Rick smoking outside the convenience store, and he is kicked out of the committee. He later tells Caitlin he joined the committee because he liked her. Meanwhile, Yick tries to avoid discussing his refugee background for a family history project, and instead brings a vase, which Arthur accidentally breaks. Arthur attempts to pretend it is being appraised but soon reveals what really happened to Yick, who decides to do his refugee background instead.
11	11	"It's Late"	Kit Hood	Yan Moore	April 5, 1987	111
Spike and Shane McKay (Bill Parrott) have unprotected sex in a bedroom at Lucy's house during a party. She begins to show up late for school and in a bad mood, lashing out at everyone including Shane. After confiding to Erica and Heather, they help her buy a pregnancy test, which she hides from her mother until relenting. A test at a clinic later reveals she was really pregnant. Meanwhile, Yick has a crush on Melanie, and Arthur tries to help him ask her out, which constantly fails. NOTE: "It's Late" was not aired by BBC until it was shown on the DEF II strand on October 3, 1988.
12	12	"Parents' Night"	Kit Hood	Yan Moore	April 26, 1987	112
Joey, Archie "Snake" Simpson (Stefan Brogren) and Wheels form a band. Joey unsuccessfully tries to lie his way out of parent's night, after given advice by Snake. Wheels receives an unexpected visit from his biological father. Meanwhile, Spike mulls over her choices with the baby and argues with Shane. When she asks Wheels, who is having conflicted feelings about being adopted, for advice, it inadvertently helps the both of them.
13	13	"Revolution"	Kit Hood	Yan Moore	May 3, 1987	113
Stephanie attempts to ask Wheels on another date, but he turns it down, citing his exams. Stephanie becomes resentful and tries to get revenge on him by propositioning Joey with a place as sports representative, which was traditionally a grade seven position, on the school paper. Having had enough of Stephanie, the grade sevens stage a protest calling for her impeachment. When Wheels proves to Joey about Stephanie's ulterior motive, he resigns, causing Stephanie to retreat into the bathroom and break down. After school, she offers to walk Arthur home, promising she will change. NOTE: This marks the final appearance of Niki Kemeny as Voula Grivogiannis.

== Home media ==
The season was released to DVD by WGBH Boston Home Video on February 1, 2005, in the United States, and by Force Entertainment on October 1, 2005, in Australia.

== Sources ==
- Ellis, Kathryn (2005). The official 411 Degrassi generations. Fenn Pub. Co. ISBN 1-55168-278-8. OCLC 59136593.
