= It's Late (Degrassi Junior High) =

- Degrassi Junior High episode
- Spike (Amanda Stepto) confirms she is pregnant to her mother (Rhonda Kristi) outside of the health clinic as Shane (Bill Parrott) looks on. Nervous about the outcome of the story and the reaction to it, two versions of this scene were filmed, one in which Spike says she isn't pregnant.
- Episode no.: Season 1 Episode 11
- Directed by: Kit Hood
- Written by: Yan Moore
- Editing by: Eric Wrate
- Original air date: March 29, 1987
- Running time: 27 minutes

Episode chronology
← Previous "Smokescreen"	Next → "Parent's Night"

"It's Late" is the 11th episode of the first season of Canadian teen drama television series Degrassi Junior High. It originally aired on the CBC in Canada on March 29, 1987. After a careless night with Shane (Bill Parrott) at a classmate's party, Spike (Amanda Stepto) fears she is pregnant. Meanwhile, Arthur (Duncan Waugh) gives continuously bad romantic advice to his friend Yick (Siluck Saysanasy).

Co-creator Linda Schuyler drew upon the experience of her sister, who became pregnant at 15 and was sent to a maternity home, as inspiration for the teenage pregnancy storyline. After a period of deliberation in which other characters were considered, Spike, who up to that point had been a nameless extra, was selected for the storyline due to her lack of prior development and unassuming nature. Due to concerns about arousing controversy, two endings were filmed.

The episode was praised in Canada for its portrayal of teenage pregnancy, with critics saying the subject was handled with sensitivity. It became one of several episodes withheld from regular broadcast by the BBC following complaints of its content, with the episode airing instead in a later time slot on BBC2. "It's Late" won an International Emmy Award as well as a Gemini Award for director Kit Hood. Spike's daughter, who was named Emma after the Emmy, became a central character of Degrassi: The Next Generation.

== Plot ==
Several kids are at a party thrown by Lucy Fernandez. As Christine "Spike" Nelson and Shane McKay are kissing near the door of a bedroom, Joey Jeremiah and Derek "Wheels" Wheeler tease the two. Annoyed, Shane leads Spike into the dark bedroom. A short time later, Erica and Heather Farrell are leaving and call Spike from the room, but notice the door is locked and receive no answer.

Later, Spike arrives at Degrassi in a bad mood, fighting with her mother, and Mr. Raditch. During class, Shane grins at Spike, and receives a cold stare back; after class, Spike lashes out at Erica, Heather, and Shane, who tries to tell her about Lucy holding another party. Shane repeatedly refuses to disclose what occurred to Joey and Wheels. A shameful Spike confides to Erica and Heather about what happened at the party and Heather echoes a myth that you can't get pregnant the first time. Nonetheless, they console her.

At her mother's beauty salon, Spike asks her mother about the myth, which she rejects. The next day, Shane finally gets Spike's attention and asks her why she is giving him the cold shoulder, to which Spike reveals she may be pregnant. Shane backs away slowly, stunned. After school, Erica and Heather take Spike to Shoppers Drug Mart to purchase a pregnancy test. When she arrives home, her mother asks what she is hiding behind her back. Spike becomes nervous and runs to her room, followed there by her mother who questions why she has become so secretive. Spike accuses her mother of not caring about her and that she doesn't "know what it's like to be 14". Her mother gives up but returns when Spike throws the pregnancy test out the door and bursts into tears.

Later, at the clinic, Spike apologizes to her mother, and Shane arrives on foot across the street, which annoys her mother. The two then meet up and enter the clinic. Afterwards, when they exit the clinic, Spike confirms that she is pregnant, and she and her mother embrace as Shane looks on. Back at school, on a flight of stairs, Spike and Shane contemplate their options, including abortion, which Shane protests against. Spike laments; "I'm just a kid ... why is this happening? It was just a little mistake.", with Shane responding that it was "sort of a big mistake."

== Cast ==
Per the Paley Center for Media:

- Amanda Stepto - Spike
- Bill Parrott - Shane
- Maureen Deiseach - Heather
- Angela Deiseach - Erica
- Neil Hope - Wheels
- Pat Mastroianni - Joey
- Duncan Waugh - Arthur
- Siluck Saysanasy - Yick
- Sara Ballingall - Melanie
- Rebecca Haines - Kathleen
- Anais Granofsky - Lucy
- Niki Kemeny - Voula
- Irene Courakos - Alexa
- Rhonda Kristi - Spike's Mom
- Daniel Woods - Mr. Raditch

== Production ==
In her 2022 memoir The Mother Of All Degrassi, co-creator Linda Schuyler revealed that the storyline was inspired by the experiences of her sister Barb, who became pregnant at 15 in the early 1970s, and was forced to go to a maternity home and hide the pregnancy from the public, something Schuyler found very problematic. She recalled: "Teen pregnancy was a subject very close to my heart. My younger sister, Barb, got pregnant at fifteen, and I saw firsthand how this changed her life...my sister inspired me to talk openly about teen sexuality and pregnancy". The storyline was then gradually developed from studies done by researcher Loretta Castellarin, who later co-authored a novel based on Spike.

The decision on which character would be given the storyline was not made immediately. Stephanie Kaye (Nicole Stoffman) was an early choice; a pre-production planning document contained an early version of "It's Late" with Stephanie Kaye in place of Spike, and Joey Jeremiah (Pat Mastroianni) in the place of Shane. However, Stephanie was eventually rejected on the grounds that the character was known for her skimpy sense of dress, and that giving her the teenage pregnancy storyline would be predictable. Moreover, the production team wanted to show that girls like Stephanie were not the only ones susceptible to teenage pregnancy.

In Schuyler's recollection, the final decision was made during a breakfast meeting with director Kit Hood and writer Yan Moore, where Hood rejected Stephanie for being "too obvious". Caitlin Ryan (Stacie Mistysyn) was put forward as another option, but Schuyler rejected it, feeling that the character wasn't ready for such a storyline. Moore then narrowed it down to Christine "Spike" Nelson, who was then a nameless extra played by Amanda Stepto. According to Schuyler, Moore's reasoning was that "[Spike's] the best choice" as "up to this point, [they knew] little about her character". In contemporary interviews, it was explained that Spike was chosen for the storyline because she was a "nice, quiet character that everybody liked" and wouldn't be expected to deal with such an issue.

When presenting an episode of the non-fiction docuseries Degrassi Talks, Stepto admitted in her opening monologue that she initially thought the storyline was unrealistic because of the wealth of information on sexually transmitted diseases and contraception. In contemporary interviews, she spoke of a perceived lack of sex education in Canadian schools. During the first readthrough of "It's Late", Stepto's castmates reportedly snickered at the script. Undecided on the outcome of the episode by the editing stage, and nervous about any potential backlash, two different endings were filmed for the episode; one in which Spike says she is pregnant, and one where she says she isn't.

=== BBC broadcast ===
"It's Late" was one of several Degrassi Junior High episodes withheld by the BBC from regular broadcast in the United Kingdom, due to parental complaints about its content. Around this time, Amanda Stepto, Spike's actress, was due to promote the show in the UK. While there, Stepto criticized the BBC's decision in the British press, describing it in an interview with the Daily Mirror as "kinda silly", arguing that the "issues [Degrassi Junior High's] been dealing with in the episodes [the BBC] wouldn't show happen everywhere and people are going to find out about them sooner or later". In 2019, she stated that the British press had tried to make her "talk shit" about the BBC during her visit. "It's Late" was eventually aired on DEF II, a programming strand for teenagers on BBC2, on October 3, 1988.

== Reception ==
=== Critical response ===
In Canada, the episode met a positive reception. In his review for The Globe and Mail, John Haslett Cuff stated that the episode "takes to the issue with remarkable intelligence and compassion", and particularly praised Kit Hood's writing, stating it "manages to weave enough different reactions to Spike's situation to provide its young audience with an informed but never moralistic sense of the dilemma." Jim Bawden of the Toronto Star was similar in his praise, remarking that "So-called adult TV movies have dealt with the same subject but never as sensitively". However, he cited the B-plot, of a younger student trying to impress a girl, as the episode's sole weakness.

In Australia, where Degrassi was also popular, the episode became notable for several scenes in which Wheels is seen wearing a sweater for the Footscray Bulldogs (now Western Bulldogs), an Australian rules football team. Wheels' unexplained wearing of the sweater bewildered Australian viewers and contributed to the show's popularity in the country. Miriam McDonald, the actress who would play Spike's daughter Emma in Degrassi: The Next Generation, has said she watched "It's Late" in health class prior to getting the role.

=== Accolades ===
The episode received an International Emmy Award for Children and Young People in 1987. Upon accepting the International Emmy, Degrassi co-creator Kit Hood announced that if Spike's baby were to be a boy, it would be named after Ralph Baruch, the president of the Academy of Television Arts and Sciences. However, it was decided to make the baby a girl, and she was named Emma, after the Emmy. Emma, who first appears as a baby in the third season, would become the central character of Degrassi: The Next Generation, with Amanda Stepto returning in a recurring role as Spike. Kit Hood would also win a Gemini Award for Best Direction in a Dramatic or Comedy Series for his work on the episode in December 1987.
