= List of Degrassi Junior High episodes =

Degrassi Junior High was the second series in the Degrassi franchise, and ran on CBC on from 18 January 1987 to 27 February 1989. The series centers around an ethnically and economically diverse group of adolescents attending the fictional Degrassi Junior High School in east end Toronto, as they deal with various issues including teenage pregnancy, abuse, and sexuality. The eleventh episode of the first season, It's Late, won an International Emmy Award.

Principal photography began on Degrassi Junior High in July 1986, and finished in December 1988.

== Episodes ==
=== Season 1 (1987) ===
The first season is set during the first half of the school year. Notable characters such as Joey Jeremiah and Christine Nelson are in Grade 8, while Caitlin Ryan is in Grade 7.

No. overall	No. in season	Title	Directed by	Written by	Original release date	Prod. code
1	1	"Kiss Me, Steph"	Kit Hood	Yan Moore	January 18, 1987	101
Stephanie Kaye (Nicole Stoffman) lets the male population of Degrassi Junior High School kiss her as part of her campaign for school president, much to the chagrin of her friend Voula Grivogiannis (Niki Kemeny). Meanwhile, her brother Arthur Kobalewscuy (Duncan Waugh) and Yick Yu (Siluck Saysanasy), both new grade seven students, evade the bullying of Joey Jeremiah (Pat Mastroianni).
2	2	"The Big Dance"	Kit Hood	Avrum Jacobson	January 25, 1987	102
Voula's conservative father refuses to let her go to the upcoming school dance. Disgruntled, Voula decides to go to the dance anyway without telling her father. Stephanie, who agreed to make a speech for a foster child charity that was sponsoring the school dance, becomes heavily intoxicated after drinking booze at Lucy Fernandez's (Anais Granofsky) house, leaving Voula to do the speech herself, just when her father arrives.
3	3	"The Experiment"	Clarke Mackey	Avrum Jacobson	February 1, 1987	103
Yick Yu (Siluck Saysanasy) is convinced that Mr. Raditch (Dan Woods) is biased against him. Aided by Arthur, Yick decides to test Raditch by passing off an old paper of Stephanie's as his own, but the plan fails and the two get detention. Meanwhile, Joey takes advantage of Melanie Brodie (Sara Ballingall) and Kathleen Mead's (Rebecca Haines) interest in taking drugs, by passing off vitamin pills as barbiturates.
4	4	"The Cover-Up"	Kit Hood	John Oughton; Jan Moore	February 8, 1987	104
Joey is offered a new jacket by Rick Munro (Craig Driscoll), the "tough kid" of the school, after Joey's parents accidentally cut his original. When Joey comes over to Rick's apartment, he finds out that Rick's father is abusive, and tries to covertly seek intervention, which is accidentally mistaken as being for himself. Meanwhile, Caitlin Ryan (Stacie Mistysyn) and Suzie Rivera (Sarah Charlesworth) try to make Rick smile.
5	5	"The Great Race"	Clarke Mackey	Yan Moore	February 15, 1987	105
Melanie, part of the girl's swim team, deals with bullying due to her breast size, as sports representative Jason Cox (Tyson Talbot) expresses sexist attitudes towards the swim team, leading Lorraine "LD" Delacorte (Amanda Cook) to challenge his soccer team to a swim race. Meanwhile, Arthur and Yick notice that everybody is growing taller than them.
6	6	"Rumour Has It"	Kit Hood	Yan Moore	February 22, 1987	106
Caitlin has recurring romantic dreams about Ms. Avery (Michelle Goodeve), who is coincidentally the subject of rumours that she is a lesbian. Caitlin begins to question her own sexuality as a result. Meanwhile, Rick wins one hundred dollars and gives everybody free liqourice, which arouses the suspicion of Arthur and Yick, who think Rick stole Yick's money.
7	7	"The Best Laid Plans"	Kit Hood	Yan Moore	March 1, 1987	107
Arthur and Stephanie's mother has plans for Friday night, which prompt them to make plans of their own while the house is vacant. Arthur plans to show Yick a pornographic movie, while Stephanie plans to invite Wheels over and have sexual intercourse. Wheels seeks his reluctant father's advice, and Joey helps him pick out condoms, but embarrasses him by loudly announcing the brands of condoms in the drug store. When Wheels arrives at Stephanie's house with flowers, he finds himself waiting on the front porch with Stephanie's mother's date, and realizes that it was her mother that sold him the condoms. When her mother catches them out, Arthur's friends arrive wanting to see the porn film.
8	8	"Nothing to Fear"	John Bertram	Scott Barrie	March 8, 1987	108
LD's father is hospitalized with angina. While troubled by her father's health episode, she refuses to visit him in the hospital, having a distrust in them after her mother had previously died in one despite being assured she would be okay. In an act of goodwill, Voula and Christine "Spike" Nelson (Amanda Stepto) send flowers to her father, who tells them LD never visited her. When she ultimately decides to visit, she finds her father dressed and about to leave. Meanwhile, the grade sevens lose the school snake.
9	9	"What a Night!"	Kit Hood	Yan Moore	March 15, 1987	109
Stephanie meets TV heartthrob Damon King and lies about her age to go on a date with him. When the situation turns into potential date-rape in Damon's car, Stephanie backs out and reveals her real age. Meanwhile, in a quest for new clothes, Lucy and Voula go to the department store, but Lucy shoplifts, causing the two to be taken to the police station.
10	10	"Smokescreen"	John Bertram	Kathryn Ellis	March 22, 1987	110
Rick joins the environmental action committee with Caitlin, which annoys Kathleen. Rick helps advertise a petition and hand it to a factory, whose boss is apathetic. Later, Kathleen catches Rick smoking outside the convenience store, and he is kicked out of the committee. He later tells Caitlin he joined the committee because he liked her. Meanwhile, Yick tries to avoid discussing his refugee background for a family history project, and instead brings a vase, which Arthur accidentally breaks. Arthur attempts to pretend it is being appraised but soon reveals what really happened to Yick, who decides to do his refugee background instead.
11	11	"It's Late"	Kit Hood	Yan Moore	March 29, 1987	111
Spike and Shane McKay (Bill Parrott) have unprotected sex in a bedroom at Lucy's house during a party. She begins to show up late for school and in a bad mood, lashing out at everyone including Shane. After confiding to Erica and Heather, they help her buy a pregnancy test, which she hides from her mother until relenting. A test at a clinic later reveals she was really pregnant. Meanwhile, Yick has a crush on Melanie, and Arthur tries to help him ask her out, which constantly fails.
12	12	"Parents' Night"	Kit Hood	Yan Moore	April 5, 1987	112
Joey, Archie "Snake" Simpson (Stefan Brogren) and Wheels form a band. Joey unsuccessfully tries to lie his way out of parent's night, after given advice by Snake. Wheels receives an unexpected visit from his biological father. Meanwhile, Spike mulls over her choices with the baby and argues with Shane. When she asks Wheels, who is having conflicted feelings about being adopted, for advice, it inadvertently helps the both of them.
13	13	"Revolution"	Kit Hood	Yan Moore	April 12, 1987	113
Stephanie attempts to ask Wheels on another date, but he turns it down, citing his exams. Stephanie becomes resentful and tries to get revenge on him by propositioning Joey with a place as sports representative, which was traditionally a grade seven position, on the school paper. Having had enough of Stephanie, the grade sevens stage a protest calling for her impeachment. When Wheels proves to Joey about Stephanie's ulterior motive, he resigns, causing Stephanie to retreat into the bathroom and break down. After school, she offers to walk Arthur home, promising she will change.

=== Season 2 (1988) ===
No. overall	No. in season	Title	Directed by	Written by	Original release date	Prod. code
14	1	"Eggbert"	Kit Hood	Yan Moore	January 4, 1988	201
Christine "Spike" Nelson, played by Amanda Stepto, who has decided to keep her baby, is given an egg to care for by her counsellor, played by Anne Thornley-Brown. Her counsellor advises her to take care of the egg, christened 'Eggbert' by Heather, as if it were a baby, to learn about responsibility. Spike refuses to speak to Shane, still angry at him for what happened. Shane, who has not yet told his parents about the pregnancy, looks to prove himself to Spike by taking care of the egg, and when he catches up with her on a stairwell, she gives him Eggbert. Shane struggles with peer pressure, as well as his own inhibitions, while taking care of the egg. Lucy invites the entire class to a party, and Spike, who is attending, confidently warns Shane about his responsibility. However, Shane goes to the party anyway, and throws Eggbert around with the other kids, which causes Spike to storm out and an argument to ensue outside. Following this, Shane tells his parents. Meanwhile, Stephanie stops dressing provocatively in an effort to act more mature and gives her clothes away to Alexa Pappadopoulos (Irene Courakos), but wants them back to impress new student Simon Dexter. NOTE: First appearance of Michael Carry as Simon Dexter
15	2	"A Helping Hand..."	Kit Hood	Yan Moore	January 11, 1988	202
A teacher named Mr. Colby substitutes for Mr. Raditch, and takes a particular interest in Lucy. Despite LD being very suspicious about Colby, Lucy denies it, but later finds out her suspicions are true when Colby begins touching her inappropriately. Meanwhile, Wheels is being tutored by Ms. Avery and gets glasses as a result of eye problems, and later witnesses Colby touching Lucy, inadvertently helping her escape a potential sexual assault when he enters the classroom to get a book.
16	3	"Great Expectations"	Kit Hood	Yan Moore	January 18, 1988	203
Joey develops a crush on the new girl, Liz O'Rourke (Cathy Keenan), and assumes she "does it" because of her clothing choices. Visibly annoyed by receiving unwanted attention, she insults Stephanie's changing into provocative clothes at school. She later befriends Spike after the latter offers to sit near her at lunch and explains to her that she wasn't judged in her hometown. Joey however becomes her work partner, ultimately planning to have sex with her. After buying condoms, he arrives at her home and they begin studying, when he tries to initiate a sexual encounter. An angered Liz then kicks him out of the house. Meanwhile, Stephanie continuously tries and fails to impress Simon. NOTE: First appearance of Cathy Keenan as Liz O'Rourke
17	4	"Dinner & a Show"	Kit Hood	Susin Nielsen	January 25, 1988	204
Shane's father invites Spike and her mother to meet for dinner in order to discuss the baby. Shane tells this to Spike, who doubts that meeting would make a difference, and that her mother would not accept the invitation at all. She ultimately does not end up telling her mother about the proposed meeting, but unbeknownst to her, her mother was already notified and had accepted the invitation. Meanwhile, Shane's parents are wanting to put the baby up for adoption as soon as it's born, as well as send him to private school, which Shane strongly disagrees with. At the dinner, there is significant tension between Shane and his parents, with them wanting to send Spike to a home, as well as claiming that Shane agreed to go to private school. Shane defends Spike, and accuses his parents of wanting to send him to private school to avoid feeling embarrassed, further adding that he would prove his responsibility as a father. Shane and Spike meet up at school the next day. Meanwhile, Melanie goes on her first date with Snake to see the film "Revenge of the Reptiles", which she claimed to Yick was not her taste. When Joey and Wheels hijack Melanie and Snake's date, Yick discovers Melanie also watching the movie.
18	5	"Stage Fright"	John Bertram	Susin Nielsen	February 1, 1988	205
Caitlin is diagnosed with epilepsy after having a seizure during the holidays, but she secretly does not take her medication out of fear of embarrassment. She auditions for a school play named "Love's Fresh Faces", where she competes with Kathleen to get the role of Isabelle. During class, Caitlin has an absence seizure, much to the confusion of her friend Susie. After auditioning for the play, Caitlin has another, but maintains that she is fine, and would be coming over to Susie's house for a sleepover. Before she goes to the sleepover, she leaves her medication in her room. Eventually, during the sleepover, Caitlin suddenly suffers a violent seizure. The next day, before dropping her off, Caitlin's mother stresses the importance of the medication and wishes her good luck on the school play. However, Kathleen ends up winning the role, and Caitlin gets the role of Isabelle's servant. Angered, she refuses to participate in the play, before eventually relenting. Meanwhile, Michelle Accette (Maureen McKay) struggles with shyness due to an upcoming school speech, which Joey and others tease her for.
19	6	"Fight!"	Yan Moore	Mike Douglas	February 8, 1988	206
Joey begins to be bullied by a boy named Dwayne (Darrin Brown) and his two friends. Joey's attempts to get revenge wind up making Dwayne angrier, and he challenges Joey to a fight in the park after school. Joey becomes fearful of the confrontation and first tries to avoid it, but Snake and Wheels tell him that he would be called a coward. Joey shows up to the fight, which draws in nearly the entire school as an audience, but winds up losing. Meanwhile, Stephanie continues to win over Simon's attention, but it becomes increasingly obvious he is more interested in Alexa.
20	7	"Bottled Up"	Kit Hood	Yan Moore	February 15, 1988	207
Kathleen tries to hide from her classmates that her mother is an alcoholic. Max and Scooter decide to shed their nerd image.
21	8	"Sealed with a Kiss"	John Bertram	Yan Moore	February 22, 1988	208
Erica claims to be more mature than her twin Heather. Erica then has a romantic encounter with a high-school boy but it all goes wrong.
22	9	"Dog Days"	Kit Hood	Yan Moore	February 29, 1988	209
Stephanie goes into a deep depression and Arthur gets attached to a dog he found, which he named Phil.
23	10	"Censored"	Mike Douglas	Kathryn Ellis	March 7, 1988	210
When parents call for Spike's removal from school because of her pregnancy, Caitlin publishes a protest.
24	11	"Trust Me"	Kit Hood	Yan Moore	March 14, 1988	211
Joey and Wheels convince Snake to have a sleepover at his parents' house as they are out of town. At his parents' house, Joey takes an increasing interest in their car, which they had left. The next morning, Wheels realizes he is late for an eye appointment, and Joey decides to take Snake's parents' car and, along with Snake, drive Wheels to the optometrist. Joey and Snake then visit a diner, where they lament the treatment of Spike by the school board. As they discuss this, a van backs into the car, and Joey and Snake discover that the taillight is broken. They drive to a mechanic, who refuses to repair the car until he is paid. They decide to use $85 that they had saved to purchase a bass amplifier and call Wheels for the money. After returning to and cleaning Snake's parents' house, Joey and Wheels leave, and go to Wheels' house, where they discover Wheels' mother on the phone to Snake's father, giving thanks for fixing his taillight, which had been broken a week prior. The situation ends in the three being barred from seeing each other by their parents, Joey's keyboard being confiscated, and Snake being grounded. Meanwhile, Spike is officially forced to leave Degrassi, a decision which angers her friends. Mr. Raditch tasks Erica and Heather with giving Spike her assignments, and Spike vows that she will pass her year regardless of the circumstances.
25	12	"...He's Back"	Clarke Mackey	Susin Nielsen; Yan Moore	March 21, 1988	212
The teacher who sexually harassed Lucy returns to Degrassi and sets his sights on an unwary Susie.
26	13	"Pass Tense"	Kit Hood	Yan Moore	March 28, 1988	213
As the semester ends, Joey learns he's being left back, which dampens his enthusiasm for the band's concert debut. Spike goes into labour.

=== Season 3 (1988–1989) ===
No. overall	No. in season	Title	Directed by	Written by	Original release date	Prod. code
27	1	"Can't Live with 'Em: Part 1"	Kit Hood	Yan Moore	November 7, 1988	301
As the new school year begins, Wheels receives some tragic news; eighth-graders Arthur and Yick conspire to make life miserable for a new seventh-grader.
28	2	"Can't Live with 'Em: Part 2"	Kit Hood	Yan Moore	November 7, 1988	302
After hearing about the accident, no one knows what to say to Wheels, especially best friend Snake. Meanwhile, Lucy begins to neglect L.D. for her new boyfriend.
29	3	"A Big Girl Now"	Kit Hood	Susin Nielsen	November 14, 1988	303
Lucy begins spending more time with Paul at the expense of her friends and Kathleen snubs Melanie after being elected vice-president.
30	4	"Season's Greetings"	Kit Hood	Yan Moore	November 21, 1988	304
As Christmas approaches, memories of their strong friendship help the feuding Arthur and Yick patch things up, Shane gets to hold his daughter, Emma, when she has to come to school with Spike.
31	5	"Loves Me, Loves Me Not"	John Bertram	Yan Moore	November 28, 1988	305
As a school dance approaches, Caitlin's crush on Joey intensifies; Dorothy falls for Yick and shy Michelle reveals her interest in BLT to the wrong person.
32	6	"He Ain't Heavy..."	Kit Hood	Yan Moore	December 5, 1988	306
Snake's older brother comes home and reveals that he is gay, which Snake finds difficult to accept. Joey takes a job as a janitor at CRAZ radio in an attempt to get his band discovered.
33	7	"The Whole Truth"	Eleanore Lindo	Susin Nielsen	December 12, 1988	307
Caitlin learns a lesson in balanced journalism when she writes an article on animal rights and Joey tries to get his demo tape heard at a radio station.
34	8	"Star-Crossed"	Kit Hood	Yan Moore	January 16, 1989	308
Erica trades identities with her twin sister to pursue a boy; Alexa and Simon reconcile.
35	9	"Food for Thought"	Eleanore Lindo	Susin Nielsen	January 23, 1989	309
Kathleen shows signs of a dangerous eating disorder when pressures mount at home and school.
36	10	"Twenty Bucks"	John Bertram	Kathryn Ellis	January 30, 1989	310
Melanie, determined to go on a date with Snake, commits a desperate act; Shane claims he can't make a child-support payment.
37	11	"Taking Off: Part 1"	Kit Hood	Yan Moore	February 6, 1989	311
A card from his biological father and fighting with his grandmother lead Wheels to a decision; Shane is introduced to hard drugs.
38	12	"Taking Off: Part 2"	Kit Hood	Yan Moore	February 6, 1989	312
Shane fails to return home from the concert; Wheels' reunion with his musician-father isn't exactly harmonious.
39	13	"Making Whoopee"	Eleanore Lindo	Susin Nielsen	February 13, 1989	313
Arthur begins to resent his father's girlfriend; Melanie has new competition for Snake's affections and Luke tries to deal with his guilt over Shane's accident.
40	14	"Black and White"	John Bertram	Yan Moore	February 20, 1989	314
Michelle and BLT learn about prejudice after deciding to attend a graduation dance together.
41	15	"Pa-arty!"	Kit Hood	Yan Moore	February 20, 1989	315
Trouble is brewing for Lucy, whose new love interest is a problem drinker and Joey, who says he'll buy beer for a party.
42	16	"Bye-Bye Junior High"	Kit Hood	Yan Moore	February 27, 1989	316
Degrassi burns down, as for the last dance at Degrassi.

== Specials ==
No. overall	No. in season	Title	Directed by	Written by	Original release date
TBA	TBA	"Degrassi Between Takes"	Anne Bayin	Unknown	October 30, 1989
A half-hour special narrated by Peter Gzowski, that serves as a behind-the-scenes look into the making of Degrassi Junior High. The special features scenes of the actors working on set, socializing, and attending the 1988 Gemini Awards. The special also features segments of Amanda Stepto being interviewed on the Vancouver radio station CKNW, Pat Mastroianni recounting an incident in which he joyrode a production van to co-stars at a restaurant, and the cast doing a readthrough of the episode "Black & White".

== See also ==
- The Kids of Degrassi Street
- Degrassi: School's Out, the made-for-television follow-up movie to the series
- List of Degrassi: The Next Generation episodes
