= Degrassi Junior High season 2 =

Degrassi Junior High
- Season 2
- Region 1 DVD cover
- No. of episodes: 13

Release
- Original network: CBC Television
- Original release: January 4 – April 18, 1988

Season chronology
- ← Previous; Season 1

The second season of Degrassi Junior High, a Canadian teen drama television series, aired in Canada from January 4, 1988, to April 18, 1988, consisting of thirteen episodes. The series follows the lives of a group of seventh and eighth grade school children attending the titular school as they face various issues and challenges such as child abuse, homophobia, teenage pregnancy, and body image.

The second season aired on Mondays at 8:30.p.m on CBC Television, in prime time. Re-runs of the first season were slotted an hour earlier by CBC's programming chief Ivan Fecan, who hailed the series, before being moved to 8:30.p.m in the leadup to the second season's debut. In the United States, the first two seasons of the series were aired together as one twenty-six-episode season on PBS. The season was released to DVD by WGBH Boston Home Video on June 7, 2005, in the United States, and by Force Entertainment on October 1, 2005, in Australia.

== Production ==
Following the show's move to prime time, Degrassi Junior High had amassed over a million weekly viewers. Kit Hood and Linda Schuyler decided to continue many of the plotlines from the previous season, while balancing them with more lighthearted plots. Several changes were made for the second season. In one instance, actor Neil Hope, who played Derek "Wheels" Wheeler, began wearing glasses after suffering severe headaches on set, in which his character followed suit. Actress Sarah Charlesworth, who played Suzie Rivera, aimed to leave to concentrate on school.

The premiere episode "Eggbert", centering around pregnant student Christine "Spike" Nelson (Amanda Stepto) and her boyfriend Shane McKay (Bill Parrott) taking care of an egg as if it were a baby, was inspired by an experiment conducted in schools across Toronto to teach children about responsibility.

== Episodes ==
No. overall	No. in season	Title	Directed by	Written by	Original release date	Prod. code
14	1	"Eggbert"	Kit Hood	Yan Moore	January 4, 1988	201
In counseling, Spike, who has decided to keep the baby, is advised to take care of an egg, christened 'Eggbert' by Heather, as if it were a baby, to learn about responsibility. She refuses to speak to Shane, still angry at him for what happened. Shane, who has not yet told his parents about the pregnancy, looks to prove himself to Spike by taking care of the egg, and when he catches up with her on a stairwell, she gives him Eggbert. Shane struggles with peer pressure, as well as his own inhibitions, while taking care of the egg. Lucy invites the entire class to a party, and Spike, who is attending, confidently warns Shane about his responsibility. However, Shane goes to the party anyway, and throws Eggbert around with the other kids, which causes Spike to storm out and an argument to ensue outside. Following this, Shane tells his parents. Meanwhile, Stephanie stops dressing provocatively in an effort to act more mature and gives her clothes away to Alexa Pappadopoulos (Irene Courakos), but wants them back to impress new student Simon Dexter. NOTE: This episode marks the first appearances of Michael Carry as Simon Dexter, and Christopher Charlesworth as Scooter Webster.
15	2	"A Helping Hand..."	Kit Hood	Yan Moore	January 11, 1988	202
A teacher named Mr. Colby substitutes for Mr. Raditch, and takes a particular interest in Lucy. Despite LD being very suspicious about Colby, Lucy denies it, but later finds out her suspicions are true when Colby begins touching her inappropriately. Meanwhile, Wheels is being tutored by Ms. Avery and gets glasses as a result of eye problems, and later witnesses Colby touching Lucy, inadvertently helping her escape a potential sexual assault when he enters the classroom to get a book.
16	3	"Great Expectations"	Kit Hood	Yan Moore	January 18, 1988	203
Joey develops a crush on the new girl, Liz O'Rourke (Cathy Keenan), and assumes she "does it" because of her clothing choices. Visibly annoyed by receiving unwanted attention, she insults Stephanie's changing into provocative clothes at school. She later befriends Spike after the latter offers to sit near her at lunch and explains to her that she wasn't judged in her hometown. Joey however becomes her work partner, ultimately planning to have sex with her. After buying condoms, he arrives at her home and they begin studying, when he tries to initiate a sexual encounter. An angered Liz then kicks him out of the house. Meanwhile, Stephanie continuously tries and fails to impress Simon. --- NOTE: Although Keenan appeared as a background character in season one, this is her first speaking role as Liz O'Rourke.
17	4	"Dinner & a Show"	Kit Hood	Susin Nielsen	January 25, 1988	204
Shane's father invites Spike and her mother to meet for dinner in order to discuss the baby. Shane tells this to Spike, who doubts that meeting would make a difference, and that her mother would accept the invitation at all. She ultimately does not end up telling her mother about the proposed meeting, but unbeknownst to her, her mother was already notified and had accepted the invitation. Meanwhile, Shane's parents are wanting to put the baby up for adoption as soon as it's born, as well as send him to private school, which Shane strongly disagrees with. At the dinner, there is significant tension between Shane and his parents, with them wanting to send Spike to a home, as well as claiming that Shane agreed to go to private school. Shane defends Spike, and accuses his parents of wanting to send him to private school to avoid feeling embarrassed, further adding that he would prove his responsibility as a father. Shane and Spike meet up at school the next day. Meanwhile, Melanie goes on her first date with Snake to see the film "Revenge of the Reptiles", which she claimed to Yick was not her taste. When Joey and Wheels hijack Melanie and Snake's date, Yick discovers Melanie also watching the movie.
18	5	"Stage Fright"	John Bertram	Susin Nielsen	February 1, 1988	205
Caitlin is diagnosed with epilepsy after having a seizure during the holidays, but she secretly does not take her medication out of fear of embarrassment. She auditions for a school play named "Love's Fresh Faces", where she competes with Kathleen to get the role of Isabelle. During class, Caitlin has an absence seizure, much to the confusion of her friend Suzie. After auditioning for the play, Caitlin has another, but maintains that she is fine, and would be coming over to Suzie's house for a sleepover. Before she goes to the sleepover, she leaves her medication in her room. Eventually, during the sleepover, Caitlin suddenly suffers a violent seizure. The next day, before dropping her off, Caitlin's mother stresses the importance of the medication and wishes her good luck on the school play. However, Kathleen ends up winning the role, and Caitlin gets the role of Isabelle's servant. Angered, she refuses to participate in the play, before eventually relenting. Meanwhile, Michelle Accette (Maureen McKay) struggles with shyness due to an upcoming school speech, to which Joey and others tease her for.
19	6	"Fight!"	Yan Moore	Mike Douglas	February 8, 1988	206
Joey begins to be bullied by a boy named Dwayne (Darrin Brown) and his two friends. Joey's attempts to get revenge wind up making Dwayne angrier, and he challenges Joey to a fight in the park after school. Joey becomes fearful of the confrontation and attempts to try to avoid it, but Snake and Wheels tell him that he would be called a coward. Joey shows up to the fight, which draws in nearly the entire school as an audience, but winds up losing. Meanwhile, Stephanie continues to win over Simon's attention, but it becomes increasingly obvious he is more interested in Alexa. NOTE: This episode marks the first appearance of Darrin Brown as Dwayne Myers. Following this episode, he would remain as a background character until the first season of Degrassi High.
20	7	"Bottled Up"	Kit Hood	Yan Moore	February 15, 1988	207
Kathleen struggles with an alcoholic mother and tries to hide this from her friends in the lead-up to a game show that they are going to compete in. When Kathleen gets home from the game show, she has an argument with her mother, which results in her being slapped in the face.
21	8	"Sealed with a Kiss"	John Bertram	Yan Moore	February 22, 1988	208
Degrassi invites the students from a nearby high school to their school dance, and Erica meets a boy named Aaron. Heather witnesses them kissing, and it causes the two to quarrel. Later, Erica begins to show symptoms of mononucleosis, and believes it to be from Aaron, who arrives at their house for a date while Erica is bedridden. Noticing Aaron appeared to mistake her for Erica and not care when told the truth, Heather decides to go on the date with him, and Aaron kisses her too. Arriving back home, she finds out that Erica's symptoms started after she had kissed Aaron, and the two get checked out at a clinic; it turns out to be tonsillitis.
22	9	"Dog Days"	Kit Hood	Yan Moore	February 29, 1988	209
The events of Stephanie's life during the past year; her stresses as school president, her failure to impress Simon Dexter, and her parents' divorce, cause her to spiral into a deep depression. She dreams of jumping from a bridge, and exhibits an extremely pessimistic demeanor at school, which concerns Erica, Heather, and even Mr. Raditch. Meanwhile, Arthur finds a dog, names him Phil and takes him in, bringing him to school. He is eventually caught twice with the dog and is forced to go home early. At home, their mother is dating a man named Jerry, who Stephanie immensely dislikes, despite seemingly being harmless. This causes friction between her and their mother, which only increases when their mother reveals she plans to marry Jerry. Arthur also quarrels with their mother over the dog and leaves the house; Stephanie follows suit to look for him and finds him at the park, and the two agree to convince their mother to keep Phil.
23	10	"Censored"	Mike Douglas	Kathryn Ellis	April 4, 1988	210
Spike falls under scrutiny with the parents of Degrassi, who demand her removal claiming her pregnancy sets a bad example. Angered, Caitlin attempts to publish a piece decrying Spike's removal, but it is rejected for being biased, and so Caitlin hands out copies of her piece to others. Spike discovers this and admonishes Caitlin for publicizing her pregnancy and not consulting her first. NOTE: This was the first episode to air after several preemptions.
24	11	"Trust Me"	Kit Hood	Yan Moore	April 11, 1988	211
Joey and Wheels convince Snake to have a sleepover at his house while his parents are away. During their stay at his house, Joey notices Snake's parents' car, and becomes enamored with the idea of driving it. The next morning, Wheels realizes he is late for an eye appointment, and despite Snake's protests, Joey suggests they drive to the optometrist themselves. After a van backs into the parked car, they believe the taillight to be broken and have it fixed, using money they saved to purchase a bass amplifier. However, they soon find out the taillight was already broken and they were found out, and are forbidden from seeing each other. Meanwhile, Spike is definitively kicked out of Degrassi, with Erica and Heather offering to give her assignments in her absence.
25	12	"...He's Back"	Clarke Mackey	Susin Nielsen; Yan Moore	April 18, 1988	212
Mr. Colby makes a surprising return to Degrassi to substitute once again, something which disgusts Lucy, Wheels, and LD. This time, Colby sets his sights on an unsuspecting Suzie, and Lucy tries to support her.
26	13	"Pass Tense"	Kit Hood	Yan Moore	April 25, 1988	213
Joey is told by Mr. Raditch that he is being held back, which makes him depressed in the lead-up to the Zit Remedy's public debut at the end-of-year dance. Spike is allowed to return to school to sit her final exams, and makes a surprise appearance at the dance, before going into labour after the band performs. NOTE: This marks the final appearance of Nicole Stoffman as Stephanie Kaye. Stoffman would leave the series to star in the CTV sitcom Learning The Ropes. This also marks the final appearance of Sarah Charlesworth as Suzie Rivera and Craig Driscoll as Rick Munro.

== Home media ==
The season was released to DVD by WGBH Boston Home Video on June 7, 2005, in the United States, and by Force Entertainment on October 1, 2005, in Australia.

== Sources ==
- Ellis, Kathryn (2005). The official 411 Degrassi generations. Fenn Pub. Co. ISBN 1-55168-278-8. OCLC 59136593.
