= Degrassi season 3 =

Degrassi (season 3) may refer to:

- Degrassi Junior High season 3 airing 1988-1989
- Degrassi: The Next Generation season 3, airing 2003–2004, renamed Degrassi in 2010
