= Degrassi season 2 =

Degrassi season 2 may refer to:

- Degrassi Junior High season 2 airing 1988
- Degrassi High season 2 airing 1990-1991
- Degrassi: The Next Generation season 2, airing 2002–2003, renamed Degrassi in 2010
