= Joey Jeremiah =

Fictional character from the "Degrassi" franchise

Joseph Jeremiah
- Degrassi character
- Publicity photograph of Joey Jeremiah from Degrassi Junior High.
- First appearance: Degrassi Junior High: January 18, 1987 (episode 1.01: "Kiss Me Steph")
- Last appearance: Degrassi: The Next Generation: May 5, 2006 (episode 5.15: "Our Lips Are Sealed, Part 1")
- Created by: Linda Schuyler and Yan Moore
- Portrayed by: Pat Mastroianni

In-universe information
- Nickname: Joey; Joe (by Julia); Mr. Jeremiah (by Mr. Raditch)
- Occupation: Former: Drug Store Stockboy; Radio Station Janitor (part-time); Musician/Songwriter (failed); Used Car Dealer
- Spouse: Julia Jeremiah (wife, deceased)
- Children: Unnamed Child (sex unknown with Tessa; abortion); Craig Manning (stepson); Angela "Angie" Jeremiah (daughter with Julia)
- Relatives: Unnamed Mother; Unnamed Father
- Nationality: Canadian

Joseph "Joey" Jeremiah is a fictional character from the Degrassi teen drama franchise. He is portrayed by Pat Mastroianni. He debuted in the first episode of Degrassi Junior High and appeared throughout Degrassi Junior High, Degrassi High, and the first five seasons of Degrassi: The Next Generation. As one of the main focus characters of the original two series, his role primarily concerns his friendship with Archie "Snake" Simpson (Stefan Brogren) and Derek "Wheels" Wheeler (Neil Hope), his on-and-off romantic relationship with Caitlin Ryan (Stacie Mistysyn), and in The Next Generation, his relationship with his stepson Craig Manning (Jake Epstein).

Characterized as a class clown and a slacker in the original series, Joey was known for his trademark fedora and Hawaiian shirts and humorous, immature attitude. However, he shows a more sensitive, caring side when his friends are in a crisis, such as his attempts to comfort Wheels after his parents' death in a vehicular accident. By Degrassi Junior High's third season, he begins an on-and-off relationship with Caitlin, which continues throughout Degrassi High. He is a central character in the television movie School's Out, that concluded the series, in which he cheats on Caitlin with another girl over the summer after he and Caitlin had an argument. By The Next Generation, Joey had a wife who died in the 1990s, and a stepson, who he takes in due to the latter's abusive father.

Mastroianni won a Gemini Award for his portrayal of Joey in 1988, and was nominated two other times for the award, as well as being named in a nomination for an ensemble cast Young Artist Award in 1990. Joey was one of the show's most popular characters, and Mastroianni has frequently commemorated the show's legacy since the 1990s.

== Development ==
Pat Mastroianni was the first teenage actor to audition for the then in-development Degrassi Junior High in 1985. At the time, he was a grade nine student who was shy and had poor grades. Towards the end of the year, his school principal announced over the PA system that a production company had dropped off audition forms for a children's television series that was to be filmed over the summer; the flyer specifically read "No Experience Necessary". Mastroianni was the only student to have taken a form. For his audition, Mastroianni aimed to portray the type of person he had hoped to be. He acted "confident and cocky", claiming to be a B-plus student. Show co-creator Linda Schuyler allegedly declared "That's our Joey.", and was subsequently given the role. Prior to Mastroianni, Billy Parrott auditioned for Joey Jeremiah, but was instead given his own character, Shane McKay. Mastroianni later cited Michael J. Fox's role as Alex P. Keaton on Family Ties as his main acting reference and motivation.

The season 2 episode "Trust Me" features a plotline based on a real incident involving Mastroianni, in which some of his castmates goaded him into driving a shuttle bus that routinely transported the cast. Mastroianni recalled that he drove four feet before being pulled out of the van and pinned against a wall by a producer. When he discovered the incident loosely fictionalized in the script of the episode, Mastroianni jokingly demanded a writing credit.

== Departure ==
When contacted about reprising his role for Degrassi: The Next Generation in 2001, Mastroianni was initially unsure, before eventually agreeing, reportedly telling Linda Schuyler: "What actor gets this opportunity to revive a role at this age? I'd be crazy not to do it." After appearing on the revival for five seasons, Mastroianni left in 2006. He announced his departure on his official website.

In later interviews, Mastroianni revealed he left The Next Generation because of his dissatisfaction with the writing of the returning original characters, including his own. At the 2022 Toronto Comicon, he elaborated that he had kept quiet for years about his frustration with the writing for Joey and other returning classic characters such as Spike, Caitlin, and Snake. He opined that while the younger writers were good at writing the newer generation of characters, they didn't fully understand the depth of the classic characters who returned, admitting that original Degrassi writer Yan Moore told him that he wished he could have written for those characters himself.

In addition, he felt that his character had served its purpose in helping pass the torch to the newer generation, and declined an offer from Linda Schuyler to return for the sixth season. Mastroianni also indicated he was interested in possibly returning in the latter seasons, when Alex Steele (who played his onscreen daughter Angie) returned as a different character named Tori Santamaria; he commented that the writers "missed the frickin' ball" at the opportunity to reintroduce Joey and Angie.

== Characterization ==
In Degrassi Junior High and Degrassi High, Joey's trademark attire consists of a fedora worn over a mullet (initially a beret) and either Hawaiian shirts or denim vests. He is characterized as a humorous, extroverted, immature slacker and self-styled ladies man who has a penchant for trying to either charm or coerce his peers into getting or doing what he wants. He is a nuisance to some and occasionally plays pranks on younger students, but he's never cruel or malicious to them. However, Joey is later shown to be caring and supportive when his friends are going through a crisis. Mr. Raditch, his English teacher and later vice principal, was usually tough on Joey, but only because he wants him to succeed. Raditch is frequently seen taking Joey's fedora from his head and placing it on the table during every class, which continues until Joey begins taking it off himself. Joey, in spite of his rebel image, always gives respect to his teachers. In Degrassi High, it is later revealed that he has dysgraphia, a learning disability involving poor handwriting and spelling, which accounts for his academic struggles. However, Joey is eventually able to overcome this.

== Role in Degrassi ==
=== Degrassi Junior High and Degrassi High ===
Joey's best friend from the beginning of the series was Wheels. Both Joey and Wheels later became best friends with Snake during the second season, when the trio formed a garage band called The Zit Remedy for the school's talent show. The band was later renamed "The Zits" when they went to high school. Despite the skepticism of his bandmates, combined with the band having only one song ("Everybody Wants Something"), Joey dreamed of making a career of this hobby, including making copies of demo tapes and a music video. Gradually, Joey and Snake became each other's best friend, although both remained close friends with Wheels.

At the conclusion of season 2 of Degrassi Junior High, Mr. Raditch informs Joey that he has failed grade eight. This news crushes Joey's spirits, as it means that he cannot join the rest of his friends in high school. Over-crowding of the high school, however, causes Joey's former classmates to take their grade 9 classes (aside from laboratory sciences) at Degrassi Junior High, and Joey thus continues to associate with them. A silver lining to repeating the eighth grade is becoming a classmate of Caitlin Ryan, an intellectual student. Working together on a class presentation, the characters develop an on-and-off relationship with each other as the series progressed.

Joey had indeed gone out to dinner to celebrate his nineteenth birthday, but with Caitlin. Their dinner is cut short when Caitlin tries to hint to an oblivious Joey that her parents are out of town and she hates to sleep alone in the house; even running her foot along his leg fails to make her point until she slips a condom into his hand. The couple make love for the first time, Caitlin believing Joey to have been a virgin as she was. Still awash in the afterglow the next day at a cottage retreat attended by their classmates, Caitlin accepts the offer of marriage that Joey had made on her graduation night. Their engagement lasts only minutes, however, until Caitlin overhears Snake reprimanding Joey about having spent the summer dating Caitlin while secretly copulating with Tessa. "Tessa Campanelli? You were fucking Tessa Campanelli?!" the shocked Caitlin asks him before throwing his ring and storming out of his life. Some months later, Caitlin is receptive to his apology at Simon and Alexa's wedding reception, and the pair share a dance as friends. That evening, Joey correctly predicts to Caitlin that she will be a famous journalist.

=== Degrassi: The Next Generation ===
Exposition in "Mother and Child Reunion" and "When Doves Cry" reveals much about the intervening eleven years. Joey owns Jeremiah Motors, a used car dealership. Sometime presumably around 1994, three years after his break-up with Caitlin, he enters a relationship with Julia Manning, one of the only people known to address him as "Joe". Several years older than Joe, Julia has a son Craig with her abusive husband Albert. It is not revealed whether Julia was divorced or even separated from Albert by the time she and Joe began dating, although Albert refers to Julia as having left him for Joey. Among the attendees at the Jeremiahs' wedding are best man Snake Simpson, classmate Christine "Spike" Nelson, Spike's daughter Emma and Julia's son Craig. Their marriage produces a daughter, Angela, before Julia dies in 1999. Devastated by the loss of his wife, Joey closes himself off from the rest of the world – including his friends – for the next year.

Joey Jeremiah as he appears in Degrassi: The Next Generation.

On the day before their combined nine- and ten-year high school reunion, Joey attempts to sell a car to his old friend, Lucy Fernandez who asks if he is coming and hints that his wife would not have wanted him to become a recluse. Joey agrees to take Lucy out for a test drive, and drops her off at Degrassi Community School. There, Joey spots Caitlin, and they contemplate how they've changed. He decides to go with them for drinks later, but still remains unconfirmed for the reunion. At the bar, his friends reminisce about old times when his television advertisement for his car dealership airs. The advertisement showed Joey ripping his shirt off, resulting in a blunt critique from Caitlin's new fiancé, Keith. A movie director, Keith initiates friction between himself and Joey by admonishing the latter to "avoid the shifty, used-car-salesman vibe." Caitlin responds that he was a total "ham" during high school, and still is. Joey commiserates with Caitlin the next night after she discovers Keith trying to seduce Allison Hunter and demeaning Caitlin. Toying with her discarded engagement ring from Keith, Caitlin asks Joey if it reminds him of that day eleven years earlier at the beach.

Season two starts when Joey's stepson Craig Manning transfers to Degrassi. Reuniting with Angie's babysitter, Emma Nelson, with whom he had danced at Joey and Julia's wedding, Craig convinces her to let him spend time with his half-sister Angie (all in violation of Craig's instructions from Albert who wants Craig to have nothing to do with Joey or Angie). Angela sees Craig's bruises from being beaten by his father Albert, and reveals it to Joey. After an emotional moment in front of Julia's grave, where Craig admits to having been abused by Albert, Joey welcomes him into his home and helps him to file a police complaint. He later helps Craig come to terms with Albert's drunk driving death, and being diagnosed with bipolar disorder.

Joey last appeared in season five's "Our Lips Are Sealed (1)." In that episode, Joey is dating Diane whom he had met at Ashley's father's wedding. In a reversal of his marriage to Julia, Joey is several years older than Diane.

== Reception ==
In 1990, Pat Mastroianni was nominated for a Young Artist Award for Outstanding Young Ensemble Cast for his role as Joey Jeremiah, alongside his co-stars that included Amanda Stepto, Neil Hope and Stefan Brogren. In 1987, 1988, and 1990, Mastroianni was nominated for Best Performance by a Lead Actor in a Continuing Dramatic Role at the Gemini Awards. At the 1988 awards, in which the series won four Geminis, Mastroianni won the award. His win was considered an upset by the Canadian press, as he had beaten several established Canadian actors such as Scott Hylands and Donnelly Rhodes.

== See also ==
- Pat Mastroianni, Joey's actor.
- Caitlin Ryan, Joey's love interest and girlfriend.
- Derek "Wheels" Wheeler, Joey's friend and bandmate.

== Sources ==
- Ellis, Kathryn (2005). The official 411 Degrassi generations. Fenn Pub. Co. ISBN 1-55168-278-8. OCLC 59136593.
- Cole, Stephen (2002). Here's looking at us : celebrating fifty years of CBC-TV. Toronto, Ont.: McClelland & Stewart. ISBN 0-7710-2251-4. OCLC 49796101.
- Mell, Eila (2008). Mickey Rooney as Archie Bunker and other TV casting almosts. Albany, GA: Bear Manor Media. ISBN 978-1-59393-145-2. OCLC 256685988.
