= Christine Nelson =

Fictional character from Degrassi

- Degrassi character
- Publicity photograph of Spike from the third season of Degrassi Junior High
- First appearance: "Degrassi Junior High: March 8, 1987 (episode 1.08: "Nothing To Fear")"; Degrassi Junior High: January 18, 1987 (episode 1.01: "Kiss Me Steph")
- Last appearance: Degrassi Takes Manhattan: July 16, 2010
- Created by: Linda Schuyler and Yan Moore
- Portrayed by: Amanda Stepto
- Number of appearances: 37 (Junior High); 25 (High); 51 (Next Generation)

In-universe information
- Full name: Christine Nelson-Simpson
- Nickname: Spike
- Occupation: Photo developer (School's Out) Hairdresser (Next Generation)
- Family: Ms. Nelson (mother); Unseen father
- Spouse: Archie "Snake" Simpson (The Next Generation)
- Children: Emma Nelson (with Shane McKay); Jack Simpson (with Archie Simpson)
- Nationality: Canadian

Christine "Spike" Nelson is a fictional character from the Degrassi teen drama franchise. Portrayed by Amanda Stepto, Spike appeared throughout Degrassi Junior High (1987–1989), Degrassi High (1989–1991), and the first nine seasons of Degrassi: The Next Generation (2001–2010). Starting as an unnamed extra before being given a name and storyline, Spike's character largely revolves around her teenage pregnancy and motherhood.

She becomes pregnant in the first season of Degrassi Junior High, and the second season shows the pregnancy's impact on her relationships and education; her relationship with boyfriend Shane McKay (Bill Parrott) is strained, and the PTA has her removed from Degrassi for setting a "bad example". After giving birth to Emma by the third season, Spike is supported with monthly child support payments, which stop when Shane withholds one to attend a concert where he falls off a bridge, landing him in a coma. By Degrassi High, Spike unsuccessfully tries to re-enter the dating scene. In Degrassi: The Next Generation, of which Emma (Miriam McDonald) is a central character, Spike appears in a recurring role and plays a primary role in a number of two-part episodes, including one revisiting Shane. She marries former classmate Snake (Stefan Brogren) and has a second child, though their marriage is briefly marred by Snake's infidelity in season five. Her role gradually recedes until her last appearance in Degrassi Takes Manhattan in 2010. A novel focused on Spike was published by James Lorimer & Co in December 1988, exploring her storyline and background in further detail.

She was one of the first major pregnant teenagers on television. "It's Late", the episode that began her pregnancy storyline, won an International Emmy, the award of which inspired the name of Spike's daughter. Like her co-stars, Amanda Stepto's public image was directly affected by her portrayal of Spike, as she was often conflated with the character and mistaken as being legitimately pregnant. The character's large spiked hair, which was Stepto's own, became considered a "trademark" of both the character and the actress. Several episodes about her pregnancy were banned from airing on the BBC in the United Kingdom, where Degrassi Junior High experienced its highest viewership. Amanda Stepto earned recognition from critics and scholars for her portrayal of Spike. In 1990, along with her co-stars, she was nominated for the Young Artist Award for Outstanding Young Ensemble Cast for Degrassi Junior High. In 1992, she was nominated for the Gemini Award for Best Performance by an Actress in a Continuing Leading Dramatic Role for Degrassi High.

Spike was one of the show's most popular characters, and her storyline was key to the franchise's later developments. She appears in a total of 113 episodes throughout the franchise.

== Concept and casting ==
=== Audition ===
Amanda Stepto noticed an audition for Degrassi Junior High when she was attending the Etobicoke School of the Arts, where she minored in drama. Identifying with the punk rock movement, Stepto had large spiked hair. In a 2016 podcast interview, Stepto explained that it was based on the style of Colin Abrahall, the vocalist of the UK82 band GBH. She was not a professional actress at the time and did not have either a resume or professional headshots, and was instead required to send in a photo to Playing With Time, the production company of the series. She recalled that an argument ensued between her and her parents, who felt her large spiked hair was unsuitable for television. Stepto refused to change her hair, telling her parents; "This is my hair! If they [Playing With Time] don't like me, fuck them!".

She was ultimately accepted and underwent the first series of acting workshops. Stepto was the only student at the school to audition for the show. Recalling this, Stepto later said: "A year later, everyone else was sorry they didn't". Initially, she auditioned for the role of provocatively dressed Stephanie Kaye, which later went to Nicole Stoffman. Show co-creator Linda Schuyler later recalled: "We said to each other afterwards, "Oh my—that girl is not Stephanie Kaye, but we need her in our show!"". The role was explicitly created for Stepto. In 2019, she recalled making approximately $50 daily for her role in Degrassi Junior High, as actors were paid based on how many lines they would have per episode.

According to Stepto, Neil Hope, who played Derek "Wheels" Wheeler, began calling her "Spike" on set, which also inspired the character's name. (Note: In The Official 411: Degrassi Generations, written by Kathryn Ellis, Bill Parrott, who played Stepto's on-screen boyfriend Shane McKay, is written as having coined the nickname. (Ellis 2005, pp. 37)) The cast was forbidden from wearing predominantly black clothing, which, according to Stepto, "ruled out like 99% percent of my wardrobe". Instead, she wore various T-shirts of punk rock and new wave bands that she liked. Like the rest of the characters on the series, Spike's experiences were loosely or directly based on Stepto's own experiences.

=== Development ===
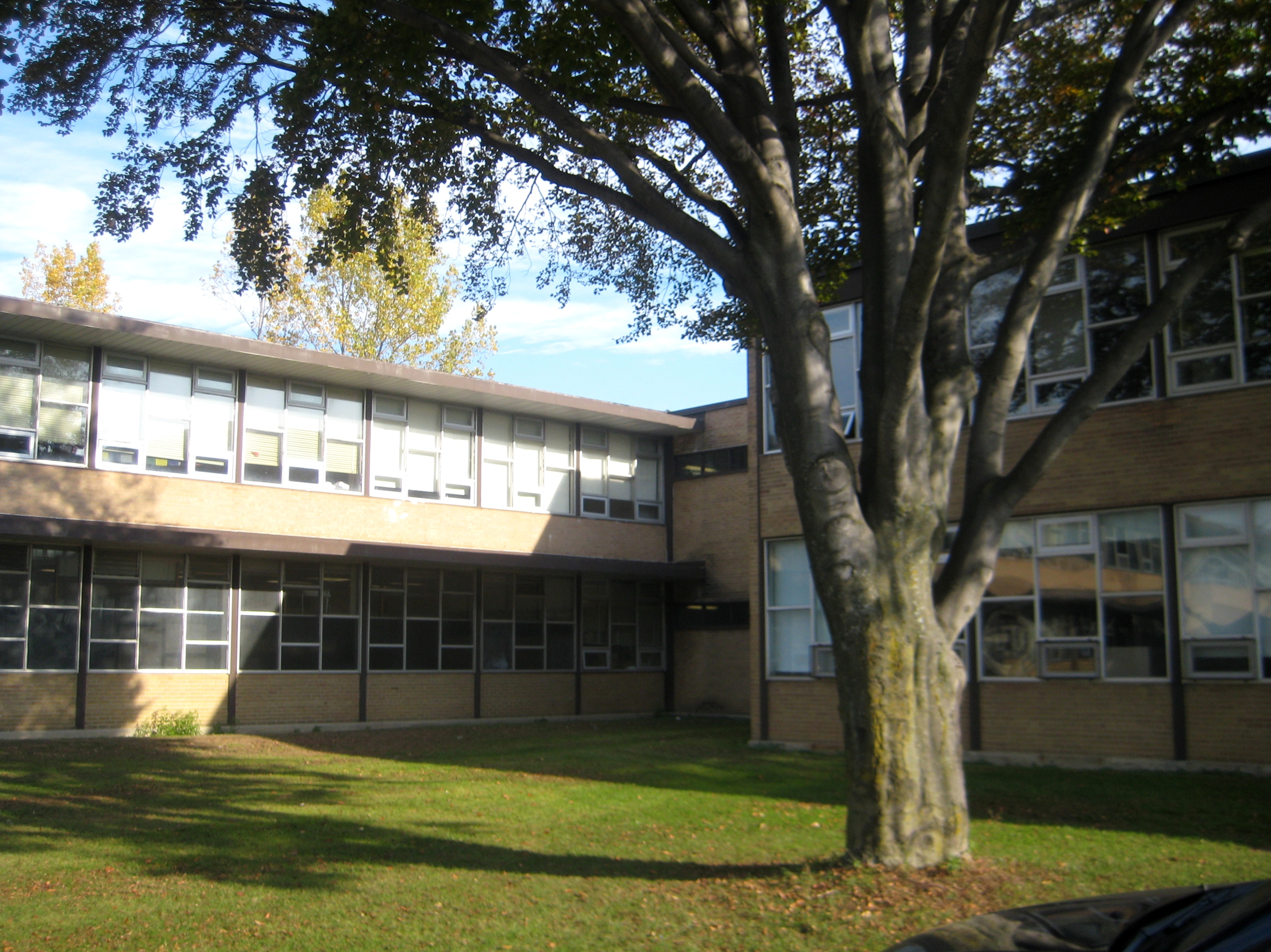
Etobicoke School of the Arts, where Stepto attended at the time of auditioning for Degrassi

Linda Schuyler said in 2015 that it was her idea to tackle teenage pregnancy during Degrassi Junior High. Schuyler told Kevin Smith in a radio interview that year that she had a teenage pregnancy in her family, and spoke of the common practice at the time in which pregnant teens were sent to maternity homes, something Schuyler found problematic. The storyline which would be later given to Spike was developed from research on teenage pregnancy by writer Loretta Castellarin, who later co-authored the Spike's companion novel.

Stephanie Kaye was considered for the storyline, however due to the nature of the character, it was decided against by the writers; Stepto explained: "You can't just say the promiscuous girls get pregnant.". Spike was chosen because she was seen as a "nice, quiet character that everybody liked", and would not be expected to be in such a situation. With Spike, the writers sought to demonstrate that "just because someone's 14 and gets pregnant doesn't mean that she's a slut."

In an episode of Degrassi Talks, Stepto noted that she initially thought the plotline was unrealistic in the context of the wealth of information on sexually transmitted diseases and contraception. Toronto Star's Catherine Dunphy noted that during the initial readthrough of "It's Late", the episode that began her pregnancy storyline, Stepto's castmates "snickered". Promoting the series, Stepto recalled receiving very little sex education during her time in Grade 8, the same grade her character became pregnant, stating that it consisted of one single gym class of "diagrams and filling in the blanks", and spoke of what she perceived as a more widespread apathy toward the subject by educators. Spike's decision to keep her baby was influenced by an increasing trend in pregnant teenagers keeping theirs. Conversely, Stepto would say in contemporary interviews that she would have had an abortion had she been in her character's situation, which she said would greatly surprise interviewers.

Stepto compared playing Spike to being her biological mother. In 1992, she named the first-season episode "Parent's Night" as her most important episode. In the episode, which immediately follows "It's Late", Spike, who is contemplating giving her baby up for adoption, seeks the advice of Wheels, who is adopted himself. Speaking on the filming of the scene, Stepto said that she felt as if she was in "the body of my biological mother talking to me". In 1988, Stepto stated to Montreal Gazette the impact that playing the role would have on her: "Spike made me realize I shouldn't hate my own mother for what she did especially when I realized I was really playing her." Other aspects from Stepto that were translated to the character included her support for animal rights, and the scrutiny that she experienced in public due to her spiked hairstyle.

=== Departure ===
Stepto last appeared as Spike in the 2010 television movie Degrassi Takes Manhattan. After season 7 of The Next Generation, Stepto was not billed in the opening credits, and the character's role was diminished significantly. An official reason for Spike's departure was not announced. At the 2022 Toronto Comicon, when asked by co-star Pat Mastroianni her thoughts on adult Spike, Stepto opined that she realized her character was ultimately meant to have a supporting role, but that she felt the lack of screen time for Spike compared to the rest of the family, was "kinda weird", especially as there continued to be scenes in the Nelson-Simpson house where she is not present.

== Characterization ==
"I would describe Spike as a young teenage mom whose mixed up and confused. She feels alone because every guy she's dealt with has hurt her in some way. People would probably think she's crabby, but she's just insecure."

— Amanda Stepto describing her character, 1989 WGBH FunFest.

Spike is characterized as a normally-behaved teenage girl with a "gentle" personality whose fashion incorporates elements of punk rock, including large spiked hair (which evolves into a "mall hair" style by Degrassi High), as well as other types of clothing such as plaid skirts, oversized sweaters and ruffled blouses. She is typically polite, but confrontational and resentful when concerning her pregnancy and motherhood. She has been described as a "petite punk rocker", "seemingly cool but naive" and a "sullen girl". As opposed to her more stoic friend Liz O'Rourke, she appears to be against violence, at one point dissuading Liz from vandalizing a diner. (Note: In the Season 3 episode "Black & White", Spike attempts to get a busgirl job at a local diner, but the manager mocks her spiked hairstyle and claims she arrived 15 minutes late.) Her personal life is explored occasionally throughout Junior High. She is shown to live alone with her mother in an apartment complex. It is mentioned in "It's Late" that her mother gave birth to Spike when she was seventeen, and a comment made by her mother in the second-season episode Dinner And A Show ("Typical male, gets off scot free") implies that the father may have abandoned her.

Amanda Stepto expressed some critical observations about her character's personality during and after the series' run. During Degrassi Junior High's run, Stepto observed that her character seemed very unhappy; when interviewed in 1990, Stepto stated that Spike was "always sad or depressed" and "sort of boring", but acknowledged her character's struggles contributing to her behavior. In 2005, she would remark that she and her character shared some similarities, including her support for animal rights, but sans the pregnancy. Interviewed by CBC's Switchback, Stepto was asked whether she was like her character in real life. She responded: "My character's much more depressing than I am, because of, you know, what she has to cope with.". However, she further stated: "It's really interesting because you learn a lot about what other people go through if they were under that same stress". Speaking to the Canadian Press in December 1988, she spoke of plotlines that she wanted for Spike, including one where she runs away to "get away from it all". She also expressed a want for "an episode where I'm laughing. I'm always asking, 'Can't I smile?'". Despite these reservations, Stepto commented that her character as portrayed in the novelization, which she described as "much more cocky", more closely resembled her real-life personality.

Speaking of her character in Next Generation in 2005, Stepto felt her character had become "boring" and "a bit dull" in the newer series, as opposed to her style in the previous series. She noted that her character "makes these yuppie dinners all the time", but felt that she was still "fashionable". Stepto also stated that she still had input into her wardrobe, particularly wearing clothing from Canadian designers.

== Role in Degrassi ==
=== Degrassi Junior High ===
Spike is occasionally seen as a background extra in the early episodes of the series, with a supporting role in the eighth episode, where she is first credited. In the episode, she and Voula Grivogiannis (Niki Kemeny) try and support the ailing father of their friend Lorraine "L.D." Delacorte (Amanda Cook), who has a fear of hospitals. The character's storyline begins in the episode "It's Late", where after a sexual encounter with Shane McKay (Bill Parrott), she becomes pregnant. This development causes their relationship to deteriorate, with the former now having to deal with the consequences of teenage pregnancy, and the latter fearing the reaction of his conservative parents (his father being a minister). Despite looking to prove himself to Spike, Shane ultimately shows a fleeting interest in the baby, exacerbated by the actions of his parents. At one point, Spike is advised in counseling to take care of an egg as if it were a baby and allows Shane to care for it himself, but he succumbs to peer pressure and throws it around at a party, causing Spike to lose trust in him. The reactions of her peers to her pregnancy are explored somewhat through the second season. (Note: Reactions are also observed postpartum. In the season three premiere, two characters overhear Spike talking about Emma, and call it "gross".) Kathleen Mead (Rebecca Haines-Saah) advocates putting Spike in a home, which Melanie Brodie (Sara Ballingall) and her other friends disagree with, arguing that it wasn't entirely Spike's fault. Eventually, she is labelled by several parents as a "bad example" and forced to be removed from Degrassi, despite the protests of Caitlin Ryan (Stacie Mistysyn). She later returns for the school dance at the end of the season, six weeks due; she goes into premature labor.

Between the second and third seasons, Emma almost dies in the hospital as a result of her premature birth, which involved over twelve hours of labor. (Note: This is told via exposition, with Spike telling others while showing photos of the baby.) When school returns, Spike refuses to let Shane see Emma, feeling he is unreliable. However, she begins to slightly warm up to him when he begins to give her part of his allowance for child support. Although she is reluctant, she eventually lets Shane hold Emma. Later, a friend persuades him to withhold payment to attend a punk rock concert, where he is later found unconscious at the bottom of a bridge causing him neurological damage, and making him estranged completely from Spike and Emma. When her other daycare arrangements begin to unravel, Spike attempts to get a job, but this is hampered by her hairstyle, for which she is mocked by the owner of a diner. By the season finale, her grades are failing and Ms. Avery (Michelle Goodeve), who delivers her report card to her mother's salon, suggests she take correspondence courses. Spike initially balks at the idea of having a future and blames Emma for her troubles, prompting Ms. Avery to tell her to count her blessings and appreciate having her baby, as not everyone is as lucky to have one. Later, at the school dance just prior to a fire, Spike approaches Ms. Avery and agrees to the correspondence courses.

Spike appears in a total of 37 episodes of Degrassi Junior High. She is in Grade 8 for the first two seasons, and in Grade 9 for the third.

=== Degrassi High ===
In Degrassi High, Spike takes Emma to a daycare that is nearby the high school. In the premiere episode "A New Start", she is sought for advice by Heather Farrell (Maureen Deiseach), whose twin sister Erica (Angela Deiseach) had gotten pregnant following a summer romance; Spike tells her that keeping Emma felt right for her, but that it did not mean that it was the right choice overall. She later meets a Grade 11 Irish student named Patrick (Vincent Walsh) who happens to wear the same Pogues T-shirt as her. Despite a fledgling relationship, which includes a song he writes for her, Spike begins to avoid him as it becomes more serious, but he sits her down and tells her to take it easy, in a speech he claimed took half a night to write. The two date for some time until breaking up off-screen in season 2, when Spike decides she could not commit to a relationship. The two are last seen together arguing in the school library over Patrick's decision to date Liz.

After Liz's date with Tim O'Connor (Keith White) goes wrong when he kisses her good night, reawakening her memories of childhood sexual abuse, Spike attempts to talk to her in the library about it. When she tells Liz it's okay to kiss somebody you like goodnight, Liz retorts, "Yeah, it's easy to see why you got pregnant.", to which Spike responds, "What sort of cheap shot was that?". Nonetheless, she still attempts to get Liz to talk to her, to no avail. Liz later meets Spike at her house as she is playing with Emma and confides her childhood abuse to her.

Later on, after the suicide of Claude Tanner (David-Armin Parcells) in the lead-up to a talent show, Spike suggests to hold the show but as a benefit, with the proceeds going to Claude's family or a charity, a proposal which is unanimously agreed upon by the other students. Later on, in the lead-up to the school semi-formal dance, she develops romantic feelings towards Archie "Snake" Simpson (Stefan Brogren) but is unrequited as he is taking Michelle Accette (Maureen McKay). Post-graduation, Spike is working at a one-hour photo lab with Tessa Campanelli (Kristen Bourne), but several months later is attending university while Emma is attending junior kindergarten, joking to Caitlin they are a "mother-daughter student team".

She appears in a total of 25 episodes of Degrassi High. She is in Grade 10 for the first season and in Grade 11 for the second. She finishes Grade 12 by the beginning of School's Out.

=== Interim ===
Events in Spike's life that occurred between the end of Degrassi High and The Next Generation are explored in the latter series. Sometime when Emma is a toddler, Spike takes Emma to visit Shane at a sanitarium in Stouffville, Ontario. However, Shane's instability frightens Spike and she decides to remove Shane from their lives out of concern for Emma's safety. She does not provide Shane with their new address nor photographs of Emma as she grows up. She does not talk about Shane to Emma, except for his name. Emma's lone memory of the sanitarium visit leads her to believe that Shane was a doctor.

=== The Next Generation ===
Spike as she appears in the fifth season of Degrassi: The Next Generation.

Spike has a recurring role in Degrassi: The Next Generation, as Emma (now played by Miriam McDonald, as opposed to several unrelated infants in the previous series) is a central character. She is one of the four characters from Degrassi Classic to have a recurring role in the newer series. While she appears frequently in the first two seasons, Stepto is not credited in the opening sequence until the third season, and appears in the opening until the eighth season. By the events of Next Generation, Spike bought out her mother's beauty salon and took up a career as a hairdresser. In the show's second season, she begins a romantic relationship with Snake. This initially disgusts Emma, as Snake is her teacher in her Media Immersion class, but she later accepts it. In the lead-up to their wedding, Spike gets pregnant again, which becomes a center of conflict as Snake had previously stated he did not want another child, but the two reconcile just before the wedding and arrive there in casual clothing. Instead of changing her last name, she adopts his surname after hers. When Emma's then-boyfriend Sean Cameron (Daniel Clark), a troubled boy, eats at the Nelson-Simpson house for dinner one night, Spike offers him leftovers, which causes him to misinterpret her offer as looking down at him and he leaves to attend a party. When Emma finds Sean after being kicked out of the party, she calls Spike to pick them up despite the embarrassed Sean insisting her not to.

The season 3 premiere Father Figure revisits the story of Shane McKay. After finding his photo in a yearbook, Emma and Craig Manning (Jake Epstein) skip school to go to Stouffville to find Shane, discovering him in an institution and causing Emma to resent Spike for allegedly lying to her, and (incorrectly assuming) allowing Shane to be committed. Craig criticizes Emma's resentment of Spike and states that she might have an explanation, and brings up that at least she has two fathers, whereas he has none. (Note: Manning's father dies in the Season 2 two-part finale "Tears Are Not Enough") Snake explains the real story to Emma at school. Shane later visits the Nelson-Simpson residence to Spike's surprise. Noticing that he's no longer a part of their lives, he has a meltdown and smashes her and Snake's wedding picture, before throwing and kicking over furniture. He also takes the home phone, preventing Spike from calling anyone, and also preventing her from fleeing. In shock at the destruction, and fighting Shane for the phone, Spike suddenly goes into labor. Emma, coming home from school, discovers the scene and warns Shane to stop, or she will never speak to him again. While in labor, Spike apologizes to Emma for keeping Shane a secret. After giving birth (with the help of Liz O'Rourke as a midwife and with Shane as a witness), she names the baby, a boy, Jack.

In the episode Accidents Will Happen, a pregnant Manny Santos (Cassie Steele) seeks Spike for advice. She states that she stayed at home while her peers went to university or traveled, (Note: In School's Out, she is said to have already been attending university.) and tells Manny that ultimately, it's the woman's decision. Despite Spike's support of Manny, Emma becomes angry at her when she decides to have an abortion. In the show's fifth season, after Emma catches Snake kissing principal Daphne Hatzilakos, an angered Spike kicks him out of the house, and she falls into a depression. As time goes on, she reveals she is having a difficult time dealing with the separation, especially when a male stripper invited by Caitlin to cheer Spike up resembles Snake. After a failed attempt by Emma and Manny to reconcile the two with a dinner, Snake is successfully able to be allowed back by singing Spike their favorite song at the shopping mall. When Spike allows him back, the crowd at the mall erupts in applause.

In the seventh season, when Snake is falsely accused of rape by Darcy Edwards (Shenae Grimes) and is suspended due to the allegations, Snake starts drinking, which prompts Spike to leave with Jack and stay with her mother. She returns several episodes later, just after Sean returns from fighting in Afghanistan to stay at the Nelson-Simpson residence. She appears less frequently during the later seasons as Emma's class is phased out, and she last appears in Degrassi Takes Manhattan, where she and Snake attend Emma and Spinner Mason's wedding. She is seen in pictures on Snake's desk in the later seasons, and her pregnancy with Emma is mentioned by Snake to Clare Edwards (Aislinn Paul), a student also dealing with teenage pregnancy.

She appears in a total of 51 episodes of The Next Generation.

== Novelization ==
A tie-in mass-market paperback novelization of Spike's story, written by Loretta Castellarin and Ken Roberts, was released in December 1988 and reprinted with an updated cover in 2006. The novel is in first-person and explores her character in greater detail, providing exposition to the relationship between Spike and Shane as well as her home life. The novel is based on the episodes "It's Late", "Eggbert", "Censored", "Pass Tense", and "Seasons Greetings".

In the book, Spike details her first interaction with Shane, at a soccer game. Their relationship develops over time, culminating in a sexual encounter at Lucy Fernandez's party. The prejudices Spike experiences as a pregnant teenager are also further addressed; for example, a petition calling for her removal from school is signed by over 300 parents, and Spike is suggested to hire a lawyer as her removal may potentially be unconstitutional. In addition, Spike's mother, portrayed as caring and supportive in the television series, is ultimately unwilling to support her daughter and lashes out at her when she decides to keep the baby rather than put it up for adoption.

== Reception and impact ==
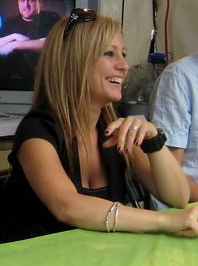
Amanda Stepto signing autographs at the Minnesota State Fair in August 2007

=== Critical reception ===
Spike was one of the most popular classic Degrassi characters, and her teenage pregnancy storyline received critical praise. Amanda Stepto was acclaimed for her portrayal, and the character has been cited as a "fan favourite" by the Vancouver Sun and a "trailblazer" by women's magazine Chatelaine. Ian Warden of The Canberra Times described Spike as a "lynchpin" of the series. Stepto was frequently recognized and mobbed by fans. Linda Schuyler claimed in 2022 that Spike was the first primetime depiction of teen pregnancy in which the baby was kept. In his book TV North, Peter Kenter stated that her storylines "struck a chord" with viewers.

I mean I used to get fan mail and people would send me baby clothes, and uh, stuffed animals and stuff like that...and sometimes I'm like, "yeah...[this is] crazy, but...well maybe my character's that realistic".

— Amanda Stepto, The Degrassi Story

Yardbarker ranked Spike at #7 on their "25 best 'Degrassi' characters" list. Writer Jeff Mezydlo remarked that despite the challenges she faced, Spike "proved to be a good example of fictional perseverance", and that the inclusion of her daughter in Degrassi: The Next Generation "opened the Degrassi door to a new generation of fans and took the franchise's popularity to greater heights". Kelly Martinez of BuzzFeed opined that the show "handled Spike's whole parenthood arc very well", noting how multiple options were presented for the pregnant Spike, and how they "ultimately didn't sugarcoat how difficult raising Emma really was for Spike." In the 2020 book Women and Popular Culture in Canada, Christine Mazumdar observed Stepto's "honest portrayal" of Spike and asserts that the character's storyline "revolutionized" how teen pregnancy was portrayed on television, as the consequences are felt throughout the years and decades since.

For her role, Stepto received two nominations. In 1990, along with her co-stars, she was nominated for the Young Artist Award for Outstanding Young Ensemble Cast for Degrassi Junior High. In 1992, she was nominated for the Gemini Award for Best Performance by an Actress in a Continuing Leading Dramatic Role for Degrassi High.

=== Impact on Stepto's public image ===
Amanda Stepto's real life image was directly impacted by the role. Her "outrageously-coiffed" punk hairstyle, which she had developed years prior to Degrassi, came to be viewed as a trademark of both her and her character. Reporting in December 1988, the Canadian Press remarked that she was recognized as "the pregnant 14-year-old student with the weird haircut". Critic Bob Remington quipped that Spike's hair resembled a "science experiment in electromagnetism". According to Stepto, the fame and recognition she received caused her confusion in dealing with public scrutiny, which she already had been experiencing prior to the show because of her hairstyle. In 2012, she recalled: "I was always being stared at because of my hair, and then as the show became more popular, I realized I couldn't tell people to fuck off and stop staring at me—they were staring at me because I was on the show." She also recalled receiving threats of violence from other punk girls, whose boyfriends were attracted to her.

In addition, she was mistaken by fans as being pregnant in real life and would be sent clothing and stuffed toys. She would also often be sent letters praising, defending and criticizing her character, and from other teenage mothers, who sought her advice. Stepto said in 1988: "Someone will come up to me and tell me everything that happened to them [...] and what can I say? They just think I went through the same thing. But I didn't. It was my character." However, she also commented that she wasn't bothered by the confusion. Stepto was often recognized and mobbed in public as a result of her character's popularity. Because of the popularity of her character, Stepto was chosen as a spokesperson for Planned Parenthood in Alberta in 1992, and she gave talks at schools across the province during the summer of 1993.

=== British Broadcasting Corporation controversy ===
In the United Kingdom, where Degrassi Junior High experienced its highest viewership, the BBC withheld "It's Late" along with several other episodes. This decision came shortly before Amanda Stepto arrived in the UK for a promotional tour in May 1988. Stepto criticized the ban in the British press. Speaking to the Daily Mirror, she said the ban was "kinda silly" and explained that the show intended to educate about the subject and not advocate it. Years later, she said that the British press had tried to make her "talk shit" about the BBC. "It's Late" was later shown on the DEF II programming strand on October 3, 1988.

=== Influence on future series ===
Spike is often described as one of the most important characters in Degrassi due to the inclusion of her daughter, Emma, in the revival series Degrassi: The Next Generation. Yardbarker's Mezydlo stated that it "can be argued that Spike is the most important character in the history of the Degrassi franchise". Degrassi: The Next Generation originated in 1999 as an unrelated teen series named Ready, Willing, and Wired, to be produced by Epitome Pictures. However, writer Yan Moore realized that Emma Nelson would be attending junior high school, and the show was re-tooled (with the original ideas mostly retained) as a revival of Degrassi. Adamo Ruggiero, who portrayed Marco Del Rossi in Degrassi: The Next Generation, told Miriam McDonald who portrayed Emma; "I'm so grateful Spike kept you. Because we would not have Degrassi, like we would not have this. [...] Let's all thank Spike."

=== Legacy ===
American ska punk band Skankin' Pickle released a song in tribute to her character, "I'm In Love with A Girl Named Spike", on their 1994 album Sing Along With Skankin' Pickle; Louder Sound's Mike Rampton named the song in his list of the ten greatest ska punk songs by seemingly forgotten bands. Frontman and Asian Man Records founder Mike Park is a fan of the Degrassi series and has admitted an affection for Stepto and her character, and co-hosts a podcast named after the song. In an episode of the Comedy Central series Tosh.0, a segment focuses on a math teacher who has an unhealthy obsession with Stepto and her Degrassi character and frequently makes musical tribute videos to her. Later in the segment, he is greeted at his door by a man who recites, in song, a restraining order against him.

== See also ==
- Emma Nelson - Spike's daughter and central character of Degrassi: The Next Generation
