= Waneta Storms =

Canadian dramatic actor (born 1968)

- Occupations: Actor, writer

Waneta Storms is a Canadian dramatic actress. She is best known for her portrayal of Isobel Lambert in the CTV series The Eleventh Hour (2003–2005), for which she was a three-time Gemini Award nominee for Best Actress in a Continuing Leading Dramatic Role.

Storms has also appeared in the Showcase series Naked Josh, Peter Benchley's Amazon, and Nikita amongst other series. She is also known for writing TV episodes, and was involved in story editing for many episodes of the Saving Hope series.

She married actor Randy Hughson in 1999.

== Filmography ==
=== Movies ===
Year	Title	Role	Notes
1996	Swann	Party Guest	
1996	Joe's So Mean to Josephine	Mona	
2003	The Happy Couple	Dianne	
2004	Trouser Accidents	Lucy	Short film
2005	My Uncle Navy and Other Inherited Disorders	Patsy	Short film
2005	A Simple Curve	Diane	
2008	Green	Gladys	Short film

=== Television ===
Year	Title	Role	Notes
1995	The Hardy Boys	Sidney Harris	"Smart Drugs, Stupid Mistakes", "R.I.P."
1997	La Femme Nikita	Nurse	"Rescue"
1998	Exhibit A: Secrets of Forensic Science	Molly Burns	"The Danforth Lady"
1999	Amazon	Rachel	Recurring role
2001	A Taste of Shakespeare	Cordelia	"King Lear"
2001	Blue Murder	Robin Milroy	"Homeless"
2002	The Eleventh Hour	Isobel Lambert	Main role
2003	Blue Murder	Nancy Esposito	"Ambush"
2005	Our Fathers	Angelo's Wife	TV film
2006	This Is Wonderland	Angela Roberts	"3.11"
2006	Between Truth and Lies	Dana	TV film
2006	Naked Josh	Megan	"Beating the Rap"
2008	Mayerthorpe	Const. Tina Legarry	TV film
2008	Murdoch Mysteries	Eunice McGinty	"'Til Death Do Us Part"
2011	Rookie Blue	Madame Celeste	"On the Double"

=== Writer ===
Year	Title	Notes
2012	Saving Hope	"Consenting Adults"
2013	Saving Hope	"Why Waste Time"
2014	Saving Hope	"Wide Awake"
2014	Saving Hope	"Stand By Me"
2015	Saving Hope	"Trading Places"
2015	Saving Hope	"Heart of Stone"
2016	Saving Hope	"Not Fade Away"
2017	Bellevue	"The Problem with the Truth"
2021	Van Helsing	Episode #57: "Sisterhunt"

== Awards ==
Award	Year	Category	Work	Result	Ref.
Gemini Awards	2002	Best Performance by an Actress in a Guest Role, Dramatic Series	Blue Murder	Nominated	
Gemini Awards	2003	Best Actress in a Continuing Leading Dramatic Role	The Eleventh Hour	Nominated	
Gemini Awards	2004	Best Actress in a Continuing Leading Dramatic Role	The Eleventh Hour	Nominated	
Gemini Awards	2005	Best Actress in a Continuing Leading Dramatic Role	The Eleventh Hour	Nominated	
Dora Mavor Moore Awards	2009	Best Leading Actress, General Theatre	The Patient Hour	Nominated	
