= Mariatu Kamara =

Sierra Leonean writer (born 1986)

- Born: 25 May 1986 (age 40)
- Occupations: Public speaker, author

Mariatu Kamara (born 25 May 1986 in Yonkro, Sierra Leone) is an author, public speaker, and UNICEF Canada's Special Representative for Children in Armed Conflict. She is chiefly known for her book, The Bite of the Mango, which details her experience surviving the civil war in Sierra Leone.

== Early life ==
Mariautu Kamara was born in Yonkro, Sierra Leone. Her mother, Aminatu, was the second wife of her father, the first being Sampa; she was thus raised in a polygamous household. At a very young age, Kamara was sent to live with her father's sister, Marie, and her husband, Alie. Her Aunt Marie raised her in Magborou, Sierra Leone, a small village of eight clay houses. She spent her days harvesting rice, vegetables, and fruit on the family farm during the day and seeing her friends at night.

== Experiences during the war ==
As a 12-year-old child during the civil war in Sierra Leone, Kamara was raped by a male family-friend named Salieu. Salieu, whom she was under pressure to marry when she reached the age of 16, was a trusted friend of her Aunt Marie. Shortly after this, the village was invaded by Revolutionary United Front rebels, who cut off both of her hands. During the attacks, she witnessed the murder of many members of her own family and friends, as well as that of Salieu. Right after the massacre, someone offered her a mango, which she was determined to eat herself. This moment inspired the title of her memoir, The Bite of the Mango. Kamara managed to escape and make her way to the Connaught Hospital in Freetown with the help of several strangers. There, surgery was performed on her arms to prevent infection. While at the hospital, she discovered that she had become pregnant from the rape.

After getting discharged from the hospital, Mariatu spent three years begging for money while living at the Aberdeen Road amputee camp. Because of the lack of nutrition available at the camp, her son Abdul died at 10 months old. She also joined a theater troupe at the camp that performed dances, songs, and plays about surviving and healing after the war, as well as about other current events like HIV/AIDS.

== Life after the war ==
In 2002, a family in Canada read about Kamara's story in a newspaper and sponsored her move to Toronto as a refugee at the age of 15. She was also given the chance to get prosthetics in London. Continuing her education, she completed an ESL program as well as her secondary education. In 2008, Kamara enrolled in the George Brown College's Assaulted Women and Children's Counselor and Advocate Program so that she could become a social worker.

Beyond her personal education, Kamara has given speeches at schools about her experience in Sierra Leone during the war as a child, and has toured with international NGOs such as Free the Children and UNICEF. She is currently UNICEF Canada's Special Representative for Children in Armed Conflict, giving speeches in the U.S., Canada, and internationally about the impact of war on children, as well as the importance of education and equality for women. In May, 2009, Kamara received a Voices of Courage Award from the Women's Refugee Commission for her advocacy on behalf of disabled and displaced people. She also founded the Mariatu Foundation, which seeks to support abused women and children refugees in Sierra Leone through the building of shelters.

== The Bite of the Mango ==
In 2008, Kamara wrote a memoir in collaboration with Canadian journalist, Susan McClelland entitled The Bite of the Mango. The book details Kamara's experience during the RUF attacks, her escape to the hospital, her time in the amputee camp, and her first few years living in Canada. It was published by Annick Press in Canada and is Kamara's only book. The Bite of the Mango has received positive reception in both academic and younger-adult settings and has been a part of school curriculum at some secondary schools in Canada. In 2009, the book won the 2009 Norma Fleck Award for Canadian Children's Non-Fiction.

=== Cited works ===
- Kamara, Mariatu; McClelland, Susan (2008). The Bite of the Mango. Annick Press. ISBN 9781554511594.
