= Caitlin Ryan (Degrassi) =

Fictional character from Degrassi franchise

- Degrassi character
- Promotional image of Caitlin Ryan from the second season of Degrassi High.
- First appearance: Degrassi Junior High: January 18, 1987 (episode 1.01: "Kiss Me Steph")
- Last appearance: Degrassi: The Next Generation: February 8, 2008 (episode 7.08: "Jessie's Girl")
- Created by: Linda Schuyler and Kit Hood
- Portrayed by: Stacie Mistysyn
- Years: 1987–92; 2001–08

In-universe information
- Occupation: Journalist; Former: Ryan's Planet (TV host); Local Heroes (TV host)
- Family: Unnamed mother Unnamed father Patrick (older brother)

Caitlin Ryan is a fictional character from the Degrassi teen drama franchise. Portrayed by Stacie Mistysyn, Caitlin is a main character on both Degrassi Junior High and Degrassi High, which chronicle her maturation from a seventh grader to a high school graduate. Mistysyn returned to play an adult Caitlin on Degrassi: The Next Generation, in which Caitlin was a recurring character. Mistysyn won a Gemini Award for her portrayal of the character in 1989.

== Development ==
Mistysyn's history with the Degrassi franchise predates Degrassi Junior High. She was taking dance lessons when she received a flyer advertising auditions for The Kids Of Degrassi Street. Unaware of what to wear to the audition, Mistysyn auditioned in shorts and a tank top; she believed that this helped her in the process because the producers "were looking for kids just being kids". In that series, Mistysyn played a character named Lisa Canard.

When production began on Junior High in 1986, creator Linda Schuyler asked her and several other cast members of the series whether they wanted to reprise their roles for the new series or portray a new character; Mistysyn recalled that she and the other cast members except one opted for new characters. Writer Yan Moore created the character specifically for Mistysyn. The character was initially named Amanda, but was renamed Caitlin after a family member of writer and publicist Kathryn Ellis.

== Storylines ==
=== Youth ===
Caitlin was born to a teacher father and a vice principal mother on March 2, 1972. It is mentioned in the series that she has a brother named Patrick, but he is never seen on the show. Caitlin is an epileptic and suffers seizures when she does not take her medication.

Caitlin is a strong student and an opinionated, passionate, and outspoken social activist on issues such as the environment, animal rights, and feminism in addition to local issues, such as teacher firings. She often expresses her views through Degrassi Junior High's newspaper, which she joins in grade seven and is appointed editor of in grade eight. Her best friend throughout junior high is Susie Rivera, and her best friend in high school is paraplegic Maya Goldberg. Caitlin once struggled with her sexual identity, unsure about whether or not she was a lesbian because of her feelings toward and dreams of Ms. Avery, one of her teachers. Ms. Avery helps Caitlin sort through her feelings and realize that just because she had feelings towards Ms. Avery did not necessarily mean she was gay.

In grade seven, Caitlin develops an infatuation with Rick Munro. The following season, she gradually begins a relationship with Joey Jeremiah. Caitlin breaks up with Joey after entering high school and meeting Claude Tanner; Claude's intellect and interest in social activism is in stark contrast to Joey's immature attitude and apathy for social issues. Her relationship with Claude ends when a security guard spots them spray painting a nuclear plant; Caitlin's jacket catches on the barbed wire atop the chain link fence, and Claude flees instead of helping her. Caitlin is sentenced to several hours of community service for her crime. At home, Caitlin's family is emotionally crippled when her father's infidelity is exposed.

After Claude commits suicide the following year, Caitlin and Joey eventually reconcile and resume dating. Joey proposes to Caitlin the next year, but Caitlin declines, citing the uncertainty of her future. That summer, Caitlin loses her virginity to Joey and eventually accepts his engagement proposal. Their engagement, however, only lasts about ten minutes due to her discovery of his infidelity. Caitlin continues her life after high school without Joey by enrolling into Carleton University to study journalism.

=== Adulthood ===
As an adult, Caitlin was a recurring character on Degrassi: The Next Generation. She hosts an environmental television program called Ryan's Planet. As a grown-up, she has also developed a propensity to be klutzy at times; however, she has been seizure-free long enough to have a driver's license and her having had epilepsy is not mentioned. In the series premiere of Degrassi: The Next Generation, Caitlin lives in the Los Angeles area and is engaged to a Hollywood producer named Keith. However, Caitlin ends the relationship when she learns about Keith's doubts about going through with marriage. Caitlin later confides with Joey that her rushing into marriage was a product of her relationship insecurities. In Season 2, both Caitlin and Lucy make brief returns as members of Spike's bridal party, at which point, Caitlin comforts Spike about her unplanned pregnancy. Caitlin is shown to be close to Spike's daughter, Emma, and shares a friendly dance with Joey at the reception. She attends the funeral of Craig's father, Albert Manning. In Season 3, Caitlin moves back to Toronto after her U.S. television program ends. She gets a job working at a local television station CQJH on the show Local Heroes as a journalist. She finds Joey in a relationship with a woman named Sidney and soon becomes jealous. Sidney, meanwhile, grows distrustful of Joey's friendship with Caitlin and later asks him whom he loved. Joey and Sidney break up and Caitlin and Joey end up kissing that same night. Later that year Caitlin is informed that there is interest in a piece she had done on HIV/AIDS a year previously. After some emotional talks with Joey, she decides to leave for a trip around the world for nine months to do her piece.

Caitlin returns in Season 4 to learn that Joey's car dealership has been doing poorly and his house has been put up for sale by Sidney. Caitlin makes a deal with Sidney, giving closure to their hostility, and buys the house for Joey. This causes a feud between Joey and Caitlin, but the matter is set aside when they learn that there has been a school shooting at Degrassi. Later that year, Caitlin meets with Kevin Smith to interview him about his new movie Jay and Silent Bob Go Canadian, Eh? Kevin chooses Degrassi as the set for the movie and things heat up between him and Caitlin on set. Later, Caitlin's boss argues with Caitlin over her skills as a journalist and takes her off the Kevin Smith story. Caitlin, feeling a lack of freedom, quits her job on Local Heroes and ends up at a bar with Kevin Smith where she, while drunk, makes out with him. She heads back to Joey's house, still drunk, and proposes to Joey. Joey accepts, and the wedding plans are on. Caitlin then, surprisingly, gets an offer to revive her show Ryan's Planet, courtesy of Kevin Smith. Caitlin reveals to Kevin she is engaged to Joey, and an argument emerges. Facing a tough decision, she takes it out on Joey and they decide not to get married after agreeing that all they do is fight. Caitlin takes Kevin up on his offer and leaves with him to Los Angeles after a tearful goodbye.

Caitlin appears in only one episode in season five despite being credited as a season regular. In the episode, Emma arranges for Caitlin to visit her mother, Spike, and console her after Spike's husband kisses the school principal. She again returns to Toronto during the seventh season episode "Jesse's Girl", where she inadvertently hooks up with Ellie's boyfriend Jesse, leading Ellie to realize that Jesse is not the man that she is meant to be with and Caitlin once again helps Ellie through this.

== Legacy ==
Stacie Mistysyn has earned three Gemini Award nominations for her role, winning one for Best Performance by an Actress in a Continuing Leading Dramatic Role in 1989.

Caitlin Ryan became the favorite Degrassi character of American screenwriter and film director Kevin Smith, who named the character Caitlin Bree from his 1994 movie Clerks after her. His admitted infatuation with Mistysyn and her character led to an attempt to cast her in his 1995 movie Mallrats, that was denied by Universal Pictures, who were seeking a more well-known actress. Smith's enthusiasm led the series' producers to create a three-episode story arc for him on Degrassi: The Next Generation, in which Smith develops a relationship with Caitlin.

== See also ==
- Christine Nelson, Caitlin's friend on Degrassi.
- Joey Jeremiah, Caitlin's on-and-off boyfriend on Degrassi.
