= UNICEF Canada =

Nonprofit organization in Toronto, Canada

Canadian UNICEF Committee - Comite UNICEF Canada

- Abbreviation: UNICEF Canada
- Formation: 1955
- Type: National Committee
- Legal status: active
- Headquarters: Toronto, Ontario, Canada
- President and CEO: Sevaun Palvetzian
- Parent organization: UNICEF
- Website: unicef.ca

Canadian UNICEF Committee - Comite UNICEF Canada, doing business as UNICEF Canada, is one of 32 UNICEF National Committees based in industrialized countries. UNICEF is a child-focused humanitarian organization, working in over 190 countries.

It was founded in 1955 by volunteers. UNICEF Canada advises the Canadian Government on policies and legislation which support programs and commitments under the UN Convention on the Rights of the Child. It joined 10 other National Committees to assist children over 190 countries and territories.

== UNICEF Canada Ambassadors ==
UNICEF Canada has appointed a number of Goodwill Ambassadors and high-profile supporters. They have included Ambassadors such as Sharon, Lois and Bram, Solange Tuyishime, Bayan Yammout, Karina LeBlanc, Veronica Tennant, Jan Lisiecki, Mariatu Kamara, John Nsabimana, and Elizabeth Dallaire.

== Finances ==
UNICEF Canada meets the guidelines and high standards of the Imagine Canada Standards Program. Out of every dollar, 70 per cent goes toward helping children, 23 per cent is spent on fundraising costs, and 7 per cent on administration. In 2017 alone, UNICEF Canada helped respond to 337 humanitarian emergencies in 102 countries. UNICEF also improved sanitation for 22 million people, provided over 15.6 million children with micronutrient powder to prevent anemia and vitamin deficiencies and provided education to 8.8 million children.

== Convention of the Rights of the Child ==
The 1989 United Nations Convention on the Rights of the Child is a comprehensive human rights treaty which enshrines specific children's rights in international law. These rights define universal principles and standards for the status and treatment of children worldwide.

== UNICEF in Canada ==
In Canada, UNICEF works to promote the rights of all children living in Canada, regardless of race, religion or nationality and is a member of the Children's Rights Alliance. It advocates children's rights around the world, child-sensitive governance, children's rights and well-being, children in fragile and conflict states and other youth engagement programs.

== Operations and Leadership ==
UNICEF Canada is headquartered in Toronto, Ontario and maintains regional offices in Montreal, Calgary and Vancouver. Sevaun Palvetzian is the president and CEO of the UNICEF Canada. Current members of the National Board of Directors of the Executive Leadership are Linton Carter, Rowena Pinto and Dave Spedding.

== Fundraising ==
UNICEF is not funded by the UN. Instead, it relies on voluntary donations to fund its work for children worldwide. UNICEF Canada organized the first Trick or Treat Campaign in 1955, and continues to raise funds annually on Halloween (October 31), recognized for this long standing brand work now as National UNICEF Day. UNICEF Canada raises funds primarily through donations, the sale of cards and gifts, partnerships with companies, emergency relief efforts and special events.

== Partners ==
UNICEF Canada is supported entirely by voluntary contributions and the support from government partners and corporate and community partners makes a significant contribution to its work. Some of the companies that currently have a corporate partnership with UNICEF Canada includes IKEA Foundation, Hallmark, H&M, Teck, Intact, International Graphics, Sherritt, Maple Leaf, Loblaw, and Fondation L’Occitane.
