= Canadian Screen Award for Best Actress in a Continuing Leading Dramatic Role =

Discontinued annual Canadian media award

The Canadian Screen Award for Best Actress in a Continuing Leading Dramatic Role is an annual Canadian television award, presented by the Academy of Canadian Cinema & Television to the best leading performance by an actress in a Canadian television series. Previously presented as part of the Gemini Awards, since 2013 it has been presented as part of the Canadian Screen Awards.

Prior to the creation of the Gemini Awards in 1986, the predecessor ACTRA Awards presented only a single award for Best Performance in a Continuing Role, differentiating neither by gender nor for the distinction between comedy and drama.

In August 2022, the academy announced that beginning with the 11th Canadian Screen Awards in 2023, a gender-neutral award for Best Leading Performance in a Drama Series will be presented.

== 1980s ==
Year	Actor	Series	Ref
1986; 1st Gemini Awards
1986; 1st Gemini Awards	Marnie McPhail	The Edison Twins	
1986; 1st Gemini Awards	Jennifer Dale	Night Heat	
1986; 1st Gemini Awards	Susan Walden	Danger Bay	
1987; 2nd Gemini Awards
1987; 2nd Gemini Awards	Dixie Seatle	Adderly	
1987; 2nd Gemini Awards	Stacie Mistysyn	Degrassi Junior High	
1987; 2nd Gemini Awards	Nicole Stoffman	Degrassi Junior High	
1987; 2nd Gemini Awards	Amber-Lea Weston	The Campbells	
1988; 3rd Gemini Awards
1988; 3rd Gemini Awards	Sonja Smits	Street Legal	
1988; 3rd Gemini Awards	Ocean Hellman	Danger Bay	
1988; 3rd Gemini Awards	Sarah Polley	Ramona	
1988; 3rd Gemini Awards	Jessica Steen	Captain Power and the Soldiers of the Future	
1989; 4th Gemini Awards
1989; 4th Gemini Awards	Stacie Mistysyn	Degrassi Junior High	
1989; 4th Gemini Awards	Alex Amini	T. and T.	
1989; 4th Gemini Awards	Janet-Laine Green	The Beachcombers	
1989; 4th Gemini Awards	Dixie Seatle	Adderly	
1989; 4th Gemini Awards	Joanne Vannicola	9B	

== 1990s ==
Year	Nominee	Series	Ref
1990; 5th Gemini Awards
1990; 5th Gemini Awards	Jackie Burroughs	Road to Avonlea	
1990; 5th Gemini Awards	Angela Deiseach	Degrassi High	
1990; 5th Gemini Awards	Stacie Mistysyn	Degrassi High	
1990; 5th Gemini Awards	Marsha Moreau	My Secret Identity	
1990; 5th Gemini Awards	Sarah Polley	Road to Avonlea	
1991; 6th Gemini Awards
1991; 6th Gemini Awards	Jackie Burroughs	Road to Avonlea	
1991; 6th Gemini Awards	Sara Botsford	E.N.G.	
1991; 6th Gemini Awards	Cynthia Dale	Street Legal	
1991; 6th Gemini Awards	Jennifer Dale	No Place Like Home	
1991; 6th Gemini Awards	Amanda Stepto	Degrassi High	
1992; 7th Gemini Awards
1992; 7th Gemini Awards	Sara Botsford	E.N.G.	
1992; 7th Gemini Awards	Cynthia Dale	Street Legal	
1992; 7th Gemini Awards	Sarah Polley	Road to Avonlea	
1992; 7th Gemini Awards	Sonja Smits	Street Legal	
1993; 8th Gemini Awards
1993; 8th Gemini Awards	Jackie Burroughs	Road to Avonlea	
1993; 8th Gemini Awards	Catherine Disher	Forever Knight	
1993; 8th Gemini Awards	Tina Keeper	North of 60	
1993; 8th Gemini Awards	Sophie Michaud	Counterstrike	
1993; 8th Gemini Awards	Sarah Polley	Road to Avonlea	
1994; 9th Gemini Awards
1994; 9th Gemini Awards	Lally Cadeau	Road to Avonlea	
1994; 9th Gemini Awards	Jackie Burroughs	Road to Avonlea	
1994; 9th Gemini Awards	Tracey Cook	North of 60	
1994; 9th Gemini Awards	Cynthia Dale	Street Legal	
1994; 9th Gemini Awards	Tina Keeper	North of 60	
1995; 10th Gemini Awards
1995; 10th Gemini Awards	Joely Collins	Madison	
1995; 10th Gemini Awards	Tracey Cook	North of 60	
1995; 10th Gemini Awards	Catherine Disher	Forever Knight	
1995; 10th Gemini Awards	Tina Keeper	North of 60	
1995; 10th Gemini Awards	Enuka Okuma	Madison	
1995; 10th Gemini Awards	Sarah Strange	Madison	
1996; 11th Gemini Awards
1996; 11th Gemini Awards	Tina Keeper	North of 60	
1996; 11th Gemini Awards	Stacy Grant	Madison	
1996; 11th Gemini Awards	Barbara Eve Harris	Side Effects	
1996; 11th Gemini Awards	Jennifer Podemski	The Rez	
1996; 11th Gemini Awards	Sarah Strange	Madison	
1996; 11th Gemini Awards	Gema Zamprogna	Road to Avonlea	
1997; 12th Gemini Awards
1997; 12th Gemini Awards	Patricia Harras	Jake and the Kid	
1997; 12th Gemini Awards	Cynthia Belliveau	Wind at My Back	
1997; 12th Gemini Awards	Tina Keeper	North of 60	
1997; 12th Gemini Awards	Sarah Strange	Madison	
1997; 12th Gemini Awards	Peta Wilson	Nikita	
1998; 13th Gemini Awards
1998; 13th Gemini Awards	Sheila McCarthy	Emily of New Moon	
1998; 13th Gemini Awards	Christina Cox	F/X: The Series	
1998; 13th Gemini Awards	Shirley Douglas	Wind at My Back	
1998; 13th Gemini Awards	Rebecca Jenkins	Black Harbour	
1998; 13th Gemini Awards	Julie Stewart	Cold Squad	
1999; 14th Gemini Awards
1999; 14th Gemini Awards	Arsinée Khanjian	Foolish Heart	
1999; 14th Gemini Awards	Kathryn Greenwood	Wind at My Back	
1999; 14th Gemini Awards	Rebecca Jenkins	Black Harbour	
1999; 14th Gemini Awards	Sheila McCarthy	Emily of New Moon	
1999; 14th Gemini Awards	Sonja Smits	Traders	
1999; 14th Gemini Awards	Peta Wilson	Nikita	

== 2000s ==
Year	Actor	Series	Ref
2000; 15th Gemini Awards
2000; 15th Gemini Awards	Torri Higginson	The City	
2000; 15th Gemini Awards	Sarah Chalke	Nothing Too Good for a Cowboy	
2000; 15th Gemini Awards	Kari Matchett	Power Play	
2000; 15th Gemini Awards	Caroline Néron	Cover Me	
2000; 15th Gemini Awards	Sonja Smits	Traders	
2000; 15th Gemini Awards	Julie Stewart	Cold Squad	
2001; 16th Gemini Awards
2001; 16th Gemini Awards	Babz Chula	These Arms of Mine	
2001; 16th Gemini Awards	Maria del Mar	Blue Murder	
2001; 16th Gemini Awards	Tamara Hickey	The Associates	
2001; 16th Gemini Awards	Julie Stewart	Cold Squad	
2001; 16th Gemini Awards	Amanda Tapping	Stargate SG-1	
2002; 17th Gemini Awards
2002; 17th Gemini Awards	Julie Stewart	Cold Squad	
2002; 17th Gemini Awards	Tamara Hickey	The Associates	
2002; 17th Gemini Awards	Janet Kidder	Tom Stone	
2002; 17th Gemini Awards	Victoria Snow	Paradise Falls	
2002; 17th Gemini Awards	Venus Terzo	Da Vinci's Inquest	
2003; 18th Gemini Awards
2003; 18th Gemini Awards	Marina Orsini	The Last Chapter II: The War Continues	
2003; 18th Gemini Awards	Tamara Hickey	Blue Murder	
2003; 18th Gemini Awards	Mimi Kuzyk	Blue Murder	
2003; 18th Gemini Awards	Julie Stewart	Cold Squad	
2003; 18th Gemini Awards	Waneta Storms	The Eleventh Hour	
2004; 19th Gemini Awards
2004; 19th Gemini Awards	Catherine Disher	Snakes & Ladders	
2004; 19th Gemini Awards	Martha Burns	Slings & Arrows	
2004; 19th Gemini Awards	Cara Pifko	This is Wonderland	
2004; 19th Gemini Awards	Waneta Storms	The Eleventh Hour	
2004; 19th Gemini Awards	Tracy Waterhouse	Blue Murder	
2005; 20th Gemini Awards
2005; 20th Gemini Awards	Cara Pifko	This is Wonderland	
2005; 20th Gemini Awards	Tammy Isbell	Paradise Falls	
2005; 20th Gemini Awards	Victoria Snow	Paradise Falls	
2005; 20th Gemini Awards	Julie Stewart	Cold Squad	
2005; 20th Gemini Awards	Waneta Storms	The Eleventh Hour	
2006; 21st Gemini Awards
2006; 21st Gemini Awards	Martha Burns	Slings and Arrows	
2006; 21st Gemini Awards	Martha Henry	At the Hotel	
2006; 21st Gemini Awards	Erin Karpluk	Godiva's	
2006; 21st Gemini Awards	Andrea Menard	Moccasin Flats	
2006; 21st Gemini Awards	Cara Pifko	This Is Wonderland	
2007; 22nd Gemini Awards
2007; 22nd Gemini Awards	Martha Burns	Slings and Arrows	
2007; 22nd Gemini Awards	Susan Coyne	Slings and Arrows	
2007; 22nd Gemini Awards	Gabrielle Miller	Robson Arms	
2007; 22nd Gemini Awards	Klea Scott	Intelligence	
2008; 23rd Gemini Awards
2008; 23rd Gemini Awards	Hélène Joy	Durham County	
2008; 23rd Gemini Awards	Kristin Booth	MVP	
2008; 23rd Gemini Awards	Natalie Dormer	The Tudors	
2008; 23rd Gemini Awards	Jewel Staite	Stargate: Atlantis	
2008; 23rd Gemini Awards	Camille Sullivan	Intelligence	
2009; 24th Gemini Awards
2009; 24th Gemini Awards	Erin Karpluk	Being Erica	
2009; 24th Gemini Awards	Natalie Dormer	The Tudors	
2009; 24th Gemini Awards	Amy Jo Johnson	Flashpoint	
2009; 24th Gemini Awards	Andrea Menard	Rabbit Fall	
2009; 24th Gemini Awards	Amanda Tapping	Sanctuary	

== 2010s ==
Year	Actor	Series	Ref
2010; 25th Gemini Awards
2010; 25th Gemini Awards	Caroline Cave	Cra$h & Burn	
2010; 25th Gemini Awards	Lynda Boyd	Republic of Doyle	
2010; 25th Gemini Awards	Hélène Joy	Durham County	
2010; 25th Gemini Awards	Grace Park	The Border	
2010; 25th Gemini Awards	Victoria Snow	Paradise Falls	
2011; 26th Gemini Awards
2011; 26th Gemini Awards	Michelle Thrush	Blackstone	
2011; 26th Gemini Awards	Erin Karpluk	Being Erica	
2011; 26th Gemini Awards	Carmen Moore	Blackstone	
2011; 26th Gemini Awards	Krystin Pellerin	Republic of Doyle	
2011; 26th Gemini Awards	Lauren Lee Smith	The Listener	
2011; 26th Gemini Awards	Camille Sullivan	Shattered	
2012; 1st Canadian Screen Awards
2012; 1st Canadian Screen Awards	Meg Tilly	Bomb Girls	
2012; 1st Canadian Screen Awards	Erica Durance	Saving Hope	
2012; 1st Canadian Screen Awards	Erin Karpluk	Being Erica	
2012; 1st Canadian Screen Awards	Amy Price-Francis	King	
2012; 1st Canadian Screen Awards	Emily Rose	Haven	
2013; 2nd Canadian Screen Awards
2013; 2nd Canadian Screen Awards	Tatiana Maslany	Orphan Black	
2013; 2nd Canadian Screen Awards	Hélène Joy	Murdoch Mysteries	
2013; 2nd Canadian Screen Awards	Michelle Thrush	Blackstone	
2013; 2nd Canadian Screen Awards	Meg Tilly	Bomb Girls	
2013; 2nd Canadian Screen Awards	Katheryn Winnick	Vikings	
2014; 3rd Canadian Screen Awards
2014; 3rd Canadian Screen Awards	Tatiana Maslany	Orphan Black	
2014; 3rd Canadian Screen Awards	Megan Follows	Reign	
2014; 3rd Canadian Screen Awards	Meaghan Rath	Being Human	
2014; 3rd Canadian Screen Awards	Jennie Raymond	Sex & Violence	
2014; 3rd Canadian Screen Awards	Jackie Torrens	Sex & Violence	
2015; 4th Canadian Screen Awards
2015; 4th Canadian Screen Awards	Tatiana Maslany	Orphan Black	
2015; 4th Canadian Screen Awards	Megan Follows	Reign	
2015; 4th Canadian Screen Awards	Kristin Lehman	Motive	
2015; 4th Canadian Screen Awards	Missy Peregrym	Rookie Blue	
2015; 4th Canadian Screen Awards	Jennie Raymond	Sex & Violence	
2016; 5th Canadian Screen Awards
2016; 5th Canadian Screen Awards	Tatiana Maslany	Orphan Black	
2016; 5th Canadian Screen Awards	Erica Durance	Saving Hope	
2016; 5th Canadian Screen Awards	Megan Follows	Reign	
2016; 5th Canadian Screen Awards	Kristin Lehman	Motive	
2016; 5th Canadian Screen Awards	Carmen Moore	Blackstone	
2017; 6th Canadian Screen Awards
2017; 6th Canadian Screen Awards	Tatiana Maslany	Orphan Black	
2017; 6th Canadian Screen Awards	Caroline Dhavernas	Mary Kills People	
2017; 6th Canadian Screen Awards	Amybeth McNulty	Anne with an E	
2017; 6th Canadian Screen Awards	Meaghan Rath	Rogue	
2017; 6th Canadian Screen Awards	Jennie Raymond	Sex & Violence	
2018; 7th Canadian Screen Awards
2018; 7th Canadian Screen Awards	Amybeth McNulty	Anne with an E	
2018; 7th Canadian Screen Awards	Wendy Crewson	The Detail	
2018; 7th Canadian Screen Awards	Caroline Dhavernas	Mary Kills People	
2018; 7th Canadian Screen Awards	Kristin Kreuk	Burden of Truth	
2018; 7th Canadian Screen Awards	Melanie Scrofano	Wynonna Earp	
2019; 8th Canadian Screen Awards
2019; 8th Canadian Screen Awards	Karine Vanasse	Cardinal	
2019; 8th Canadian Screen Awards	Caroline Dhavernas	Mary Kills People	
2019; 8th Canadian Screen Awards	Amybeth McNulty	Anne with an E	
2019; 8th Canadian Screen Awards	Lauren Lee Smith	Frankie Drake Mysteries	
2019; 8th Canadian Screen Awards	Serinda Swan	Coroner	

== 2020s ==
Year	Actor	Series	Ref
2020; 9th Canadian Screen Awards
2020; 9th Canadian Screen Awards	Crystle Lightning	Trickster	
2020; 9th Canadian Screen Awards	Vinessa Antoine	Diggstown	
2020; 9th Canadian Screen Awards	Kristin Kreuk	Burden of Truth	
2020; 9th Canadian Screen Awards	Melanie Scrofano	Wynonna Earp	
2020; 9th Canadian Screen Awards	Karine Vanasse	Cardinal: Until the Night	
2021; 10th Canadian Screen Awards
2021; 10th Canadian Screen Awards	Laurence Leboeuf	Transplant	
2021; 10th Canadian Screen Awards	Vinessa Antoine	Diggstown	
2021; 10th Canadian Screen Awards	Kristin Kreuk	Burden of Truth	
2021; 10th Canadian Screen Awards	Melanie Scrofano	Wynonna Earp	
2021; 10th Canadian Screen Awards	Serinda Swan	Coroner	
