= Amanda Stepto =

Canadian actress (born 1970)

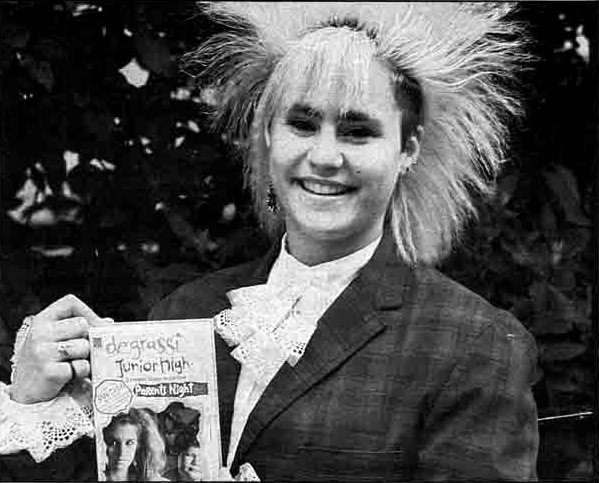
- Stepto promoting Degrassi Junior High in the United Kingdom in 1988
- Born: Amanda Felicitas Stepto; July 31, 1970 (age 55); Montreal, Quebec, Canada
- Education: Etobicoke School of the Arts
- Alma mater: University of Toronto
- Occupations: Actress, DJ
- Years active: 1986–2010
- Known for: Playing Christine "Spike" Nelson in the Degrassi franchise
- Television: Degrassi Junior High, Degrassi High, Degrassi: The Next Generation

Amanda Felicitas Stepto (born 31 July 1970) is a Canadian retired actress who played Christine "Spike" Nelson throughout the majority of the Degrassi teen drama franchise. With no previous acting experience, she rose to prominence playing the character on the CBC's Degrassi Junior High (1987–1989) and its follow-up Degrassi High (1989–1991).

Spike's controversial teenage pregnancy storyline, as well as the punk hairstyle worn by both the character and actress, gave Stepto significant media attention in Canada. Degrassi Junior High was largely truncated and later dropped by the BBC in large part due to "It's Late", the episode which heralded the storyline. In 1989, she was made a Goodwill Ambassador of UNICEF Ontario along with most of the cast. In the early 1990s, Stepto was a spokesperson for Planned Parenthood and was sponsored by the organization for a controversial 1993 tour of high schools in Alberta.

Having left acting in the 1990s due to typecasting and loss of interest, Stepto returned to reprise the role of Spike as an adult in the first seven seasons of Degrassi: The Next Generation (2001–2008). Degrassi remains her only major acting role, and as of 2018, she no longer acts. She was praised for her performance and was nominated for a Young Artist Award (as part of an ensemble) and a Gemini Award.

== Biography ==
=== Early life: 1970-1986 ===
Stepto was born on 31 July 1970 in Montreal, Quebec, the daughter of a young local woman and an "American jazz musician just passing through". Her birth mother put her up for adoption at three months old. She was raised in Meadowvale, Mississauga. On a 2016 episode of Damian Abraham's podcast Turned Out A Punk, Stepto recalled that her first exposure to punk rock was an outdoor concert by the English new wave band The Police, dubbed the "Police Picnic", which took place in Oakville, Ontario in August 1981. Stepto recalled that she was transfixed by the punks in the audience and developed an interest in the genre and aesthetic.

=== Degrassi: 1987-1992 ===
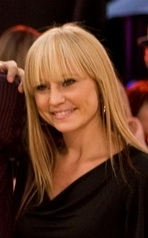
Stepto at the 2008 Toronto International Film Festival.

She attended the Etobicoke School of the Arts for three years, where she majored in dance and minored in drama, and later a school in Mississauga while starring on television. While attending Etobicoke, Stepto learnt of an open audition for Degrassi Junior High from her drama teacher. (Note: The preface to Degrassi Talks: Sex was written by writer Catherine Dunphy. Stepto gave her own account in a 1998 interview with Degrassi fan site owner Natalie Earl, where she says she discovered the audition via an announcement posted in Etobicoke School Of The Arts' drama department. "Amanda Stepto Interview for MARK". 3 February 2007. Archived from the original on 3 February 2007.) She was the only student to act on it. She did not have a resume or professional headshots, and was required to send in a photo of herself to the production company. Stepto's parents felt her punk hairstyle was not suitable for television, and she argued with them over it. Insisting she keep her hair spiked, she told her parents: "If they don't like me, fuck them!". She was subsequently accepted.

When her character became pregnant, fans mistook her for being pregnant in real life, and would often send the actress toys. She was also often asked for advice from parents and teenage mothers on sex and pregnancy as if she were a counselor. In the United Kingdom, where Degrassi Junior High experienced its highest viewership, the BBC refused to air "It's Late" along with several other episodes, shortly before Stepto was expected to promote the series in London. Stepto was critical of the BBC's decision when speaking to the British press. Speaking to the Daily Mirror on 13 May 1988, Stepto called the ban "kinda silly", and elaborated: "The issues we've been dealing with in the episodes they wouldn't show happen everywhere and people are going to find out about them sooner or later." She also explained that the show intended to educate its viewers on the subject and did not encourage it at all. Stepto later said that the English press tried to make her "talk shit" about the BBC.

Stepto was among the cast of Degrassi that were named UNICEF Goodwill Ambassadors by the Ontario branch of UNICEF Canada in 1989. Along with cast member Pat Mastroianni, Stepto visited the Headquarters of the United Nations in New York City, and met with other ambassadors. She served as the narrator for the UNICEF video The Degrassi Kids Rap On Rights. In 1991, Stepto was one of the main six actors to host an episode of Degrassi Talks, a documentary series in which cast members interviewed teenagers and young adults across Canada about various topics. Stepto's episode focused on sex, and highlighted issues such as teenage pregnancy, safe sex, and abortion. In the episode, Stepto interviews a young woman who gave her baby up for adoption, an experience which had a profound impact on her.

=== Post-Degrassi: 1992-1995 ===
Outside of Degrassi, Stepto appeared on stage in the play Flesh and Blood, written by Colin Thomas, about several young adults dealing with AIDS; the play won a Floyd S. Chalmers Canadian Play Award for playwriting in 1991. Reviewing the production for the Toronto Star, Geoff Chapman opined that Stepto had "little chance to make her role count", and criticized her "indistinct diction", while Stewart Brown of the Hamilton Spectator said she was "too soft-spoken and understated in her first appearance in professional theatre".

Following the end of Degrassi, Stepto indicated to the Calgary Herald in 1992 that she was interested in further pursuing her acting career, and stated that she was particularly interested in playing destructive, "psychotic" characters. However, she was largely typecast because of Degrassi, and she later admitted to sabotaging her own auditions, as she disliked many of the roles she was offered. In one instance, she did not want to audition for the YTV musical drama series Catwalk, which she derided as a "cheesy low-budget show", but did not explicitly turn it down because she felt intimidated by her agent, and instead deliberately ruined the audition. she later explained that this, among other things, may have been a factor in her lack of success post-Degrassi.

In 1992, she was appointed a spokesperson for Planned Parenthood in Alberta. Stepto visited Calgary as a representative of the organization in September 1992, and that same month, appeared in television, radio, and print advertisements promoting the "Just Talk About It" campaign. Starting from May 1993, Stepto undertook a 37-stop tour of schools across the province to promote a campaign by Planned Parenthood; a viewing of the Degrassi Talks episode she hosted was optional. On 28 April 1993, the Calgary Herald reported that three Albertan schools had refused Stepto's presentation, though two of the schools denied this, claiming that they were never made aware of the program.

=== Later acting career: 1995-2010 ===
In 1995, she starred in a supporting role in the Su Rynard short film Big Deal So What, playing the friend and colleague of the protagonist. She eventually left the acting business to concentrate on school. At the 2022 Toronto Comicon, Stepto explained that she had extreme difficulty pursuing a career in acting following the show; the roles she was offered were usually similar to Spike, and she was directly rejected for being too well-known as Spike. Additionally, she said that producers would constantly tell her that she was "too short", "too fat", or "cheeks are too full", and eventually she was "tired of all that bullshit" and left the acting business to pursue other endeavors.

Stepto reprised her role as Spike on Degrassi: The Next Generation, of which primarily featured her character's daughter, Emma Nelson, as a central character; she made occasional appearances as Spike until the 2010 television film Degrassi Takes Manhattan. Degrassi remains Stepto's only major acting role; she made brief cameo appearances in the medical drama Strong Medicine, and the science fiction series ReGenesis.

As of 2018, Stepto is no longer active as an actress. In December 2023, she attended the induction of Degrassi into Canada's Walk of Fame.

== Legacy ==
Stepto was acclaimed for her "honest" portrayal of Spike, and the character has been cited as a "fan favourite", a "trailblazer", and because of her character's daughter's role in Degrassi: The Next Generation, important to the franchise's continuity. Even prior to The Next Generation, Ian Warden of The Canberra Times described Spike as a "lynchpin" of the series. She was frequently recognized and mobbed by fans. She would also receive threats of violence from other girls whose boyfriends were attracted to her.

=== Hairstyle and public image ===
A significant part of Stepto's public image was her large spiked hairstyle, which became a trademark of her Degrassi character, and contributed to the media attention Stepto received in the late 1980s. Described as "outrageously-coiffed", she stated in 2005 that it was achieved using "lots of Final Net". She stated that she developed the hairstyle years before Degrassi, citing Colin Abrahall, vocalist of the UK82 band GBH, as her chief stylistic inspiration. In 1988, Edmonton Journal staff writer Bob Remington quipped that her hairstyle resembled "a science experiment in electromagnetism". Stepto often received unwanted attention and even harassment in public because of this hairstyle, and faced a dilemma following her rise in public profile; speaking to The Grid in 2012, she stated: "I realized I couldn't [continue to] tell people to fuck off and stop staring at me—they were staring at me because I was on the show."

On Turned Out A Punk, she stated that her hairstyle and fashion sense resulted in her being kicked out of various shopping centres, and recounted the experience of being asked to leave the Toronto Eaton Centre for apparently "lolling around", despite carrying hundreds of dollars' worth of items. In the foreword to the Degrassi Talks: Sex print adaptation, she told journalist Catherine Dunphy that she was given a strike at school by her ballet teacher, because the hair "didn't go with the pink getup". According to Stepto, these experiences directly influenced a storyline on Degrassi Junior High, in which Spike attempts to get a job at a local diner, but is mocked by the manager because of her hair.

== Personal life ==
Stepto graduated from the University of Toronto with a bachelor's degree in history and political science. In the late 1990s, she had a brief stint teaching English in Japan. She is an advocate for animal rights and a vegetarian. On the Turned Out A Punk podcast, she cited Morrissey, as well as the Smiths album Meat Is Murder, as having helped affirm her beliefs. During the 1990s, she was the manager of the clothing store Shakti, located in the Kensington Market, and operated a jewelry booth at Lollapalooza with co-star Cathy Keenan. In 2009, she began performing as a DJ in Toronto under the name "DJ Demanda" with former co-star Stacie Mistysyn, who went under the name "Mistylicious".

As of 2017, Stepto resided in Ireland, and as of 2018, resided in Mississauga, Ontario.

== Nominations ==
For Degrassi, Stepto was nominated twice. In 1990, along with her co-stars, she was nominated for the Young Artist Award for Outstanding Young Ensemble Cast for Degrassi Junior High. In 1992, she was nominated for the Gemini Award for Best Performance by an Actress in a Continuing Leading Dramatic Role for Degrassi High. She appeared as a celebrity presenter at the ceremony.

== Filmography ==
=== Film ===
Year	Work	Role		Ref
1992	School's Out	Christine "Spike" Nelson	TV movie	
1996	Big Deal So What	Ruth	Short film	
2010	Degrassi Takes Manhattan	Christine "Spike" Nelson	TV movie	

=== Television ===
Year	Work	Role	Notes	Ref(s)
1987–1989	Degrassi Junior High	Christine "Spike" Nelson		
1989–1991	Degrassi High	Christine "Spike" Nelson		
1992	Degrassi Talks	Self	6 episodes	
2000	Strong Medicine	Mary	Episode: "Pilot"	
2001–2010	Degrassi: The Next Generation	Christine "Spike" Nelson	122 episodes	
2006	Degrassi: Minis	Christine "Spike" Nelson	1 episode	
2007	Degrassi: Doing What Matters	Self	Television special	
2007	ReGenesis	Leslie McCaine	2 episodes	

=== Theater ===
Year	Work	Role	Ref
1991–1992	Flesh And Blood	Sherri	

== Sources ==
- Degrassi Talks: Sex. Toronto: Boardwalk Books. 1992. pp. 8–15. ISBN 1-895681-01-4. OCLC 25370148.
- Ellis, Kathryn (2005). The official 411 Degrassi generations. Fenn Pub. Co. pp. 46–47. ISBN 1-55168-278-8. OCLC 59136593.
- Women and popular culture in Canada. Laine Zisman Newman. Toronto. 2020. pp. 104–108. ISBN 978-0-88961-615-8. OCLC 1140640717.
