= Pat Mastroianni =

Canadian actor

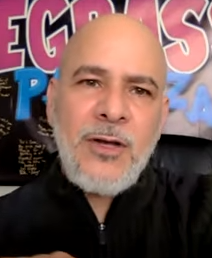
- Mastroianni in 2021
- Born: Pasquale Mastroianni; December 22, 1971 (age 54); Toronto, Ontario, Canada
- Occupation: Actor
- Years active: 1987−present

Pasquale Mastroianni (born December 22, 1971), known professionally as Pat Mastroianni, is a Canadian actor who is best known for his role as Joey Jeremiah in the Degrassi television franchise, playing the role as a student in Degrassi Junior High (1987–89) and Degrassi High (1989–91), and reprising the role as an adult on Degrassi: The Next Generation (2001–06). In 1988, he received a Gemini Award for Degrassi Junior High.

== Biography ==
Mastroianni grew up in Toronto, the son of Angela and Angelo Mastroianni. He is of Italian heritage. He later recalled that he had first heard about the audition of Degrassi over his school's PA system.

Mastroianni was among the cast of Degrassi that were named UNICEF Goodwill Ambassadors by the Ontario branch of UNICEF Canada in 1989. Along with cast member Amanda Stepto, Mastroianni visited the Headquarters of the United Nations in New York City.

After Degrassi High ended in 1992, Mastroianni worked as a waiter and a paver in his father's construction business and gave up college for acting when his university mandated that he devote all his time to his studies. He had roles in several Canadian productions, including Liberty Street and Music Works. Though he was quoted as saying in 1998 that there was "very little" chance of a Degrassi sequel, Degrassi: The Next Generation began in 2001, where Mastroianni reprised his role as Joey for five seasons.

Mastroianni was a guest star on the supernatural medical drama Saving Hope.

== Filmography ==
=== Film ===
| Year | Title | Role | Notes |
|---|---|---|---|
| 1998 | Godzilla | Apache Pilot | |
| 2001 | The Good Things | Asshole | Short film |
| 2002 | If Wishes Were Horses | Jerome | |
| 2003 | The Happy Couple | Distress line caller | |
| 2009 | 40 Is the New 20 | Gary | |
| 2010 | The Untitled Work of Paul Shepard | Jack | |
| 2011 | Sharpay's Fabulous Adventure | Jerry Taylor | Direct-to-video |
| 2011 | Unlucky | Fredo | Short film |
| 2013 | A Very Larry Christmas | Mr. James | |
| 2014 | Bastards | Pat Mastroianni | Short film |
| 2014 | Bold & Brash: Filmmaking Boisvert Style | Himself | Documentary |
| 2015 | Let's Rap | Bruce | |
| 2017 | Firebase | Dr. Bonham | Short film |
| 2017 | The Sound | Taxi Driver #2 | |
| 2018 | Mistle Twins | Stu | |
| 2019 | An Assortment of Christmas Tales in No Particular Order | Stu | |
| 2020 | Narbo's Guide to being a BroomHead | Himself | Editor; Director; Producer |

=== Television ===
| Year | Title | Role | Notes |
|---|---|---|---|
| 1987-1991 | Degrassi Junior High / Degrassi High | Joey Jeremiah | Main cast; 67 episodes |
| 1989 | Street Legal | Neill Browne | Episode: "Home" |
| 1990 | War of the Worlds | Pitcher | Episode: "Candle in the Night" |
| 1991 | Northwood | Special Guest Star | Episode: "Chains" |
| 1992 | School's Out | Joey Jeremiah | TV movie |
| 1992 | Degrassi Talks | Himself / Host | 6 episodes |
| 1992 | Top Cops | | Episode: "Nick McDonald/Jacklean Davis" |
| 1993 | Secret Service | Sammy | Episode: "Gentlemen Prefer Bonds/The IDs of March" |
| 1994 | The Counterfeit Contessa | Carlos | TV movie |
| 1994 | Catwalk | Vic | Episode: "Getting What You Want" |
| 1995-1996 | Liberty Street | Frank Pagnozzi | Main cast; 26 episodes |
| 1996 | Music Works | Himself / Host | |
| 1997 | F/X: The Series | Cop #1 | Episode: "Requiem for a Cop" |
| 1998 | Once a Thief | Maurice "Momo" Momomamet | Episode: "Kangaroo Court" |
| 1999 | Psi Factor | Luis Sanchez | Also known as Psi Factor: Chronicles of the Paranormal; Episode: "Solitary Confinement" |
| 2001-2006 | Degrassi: The Next Generation | Joey Jeremiah | 87 episodes |
| 2003 | Blue Murder | Father Raphael Pinero | Episode: "Speed Demons" |
| 2003 | Playmakers | Mendes | Episode : "Piss Man" |
| 2003 | Mayday | Lima Air Traffic Controller | Episode "Flying Blind" |
| 2006 | Beautiful People | Greg | 2 episodes |
| 2006 | Sons of Butcher | Parsons | Voice; Episode: "Playin' the Part" |
| 2006 | Grossology | Keith Van Kobbler | Voice; Also known as Glurp Attack; Episode: "It's Gotta Be the Shoes" |
| 2009 | Cra$h & Burn | Clubhouse Manager | Episode: "Trust" |
| 2011 | Connor Undercover | Diego Ramirez | 5 episodes |
| 2012 | Rookie Blue | Doug Corbo | Episode: "The First Day of the Rest of Your Life" |
| 2012 | Saving Hope | Paul Lewis | Episode: "Contact" |
| 2013 | The Listener | Dino Deluca | Episode: "Witness for the Prosecution" |
| 2013 | Cracked | Dr. Alberto Sanchez | Episode: "The Valley" |
| 2014-2015 | Bitten | Meyer Schwartz / Superintendent | 2 episodes |
| 2015-2016 | Beauty & the Beast | Agent Russo / DHS Special Agent Russo | 3 episodes |
| 2015 | Dark Matter | Hagen | Episode: "Episode Two" |
| 2016 | Man Seeking Woman | Greg | Episode: "Card" |
| 2016 | Suits | Tom Linder | Episode: "God's Green Earth" |
| 2016 | Flower Shop Mysteries | Conner Mckay | Episode: "Flower Shop Mystery: Snipped in the Bud" |
| 2017 | Good Witch | Mr. Decarlo | Episode: "In Sickness and in Health" |

== Awards and nominations ==
| Year | Award | Category | Nominated work | Result | Ref. |
|---|---|---|---|---|---|
| 1987 | Gemini Awards | Best Performance by a Lead Actor in a Continuing Dramatic Role | Degrassi High | Nominated | |
| 1988 | Gemini Awards | Best Performance by a Lead Actor in a Continuing Dramatic Role | Degrassi High | Won | |
| 1990 | Gemini Awards | Best Performance by a Lead Actor in a Continuing Dramatic Role | Degrassi High | Nominated | |
| 1990 | Young Artist Awards | Outstanding Young Ensemble Cast | Degrassi High | Nominated | |
| 2003 | Gemini Awards | Best Host in a Practical Information, or Performing Arts Program or Series | Music Works | Nominated | |
| 2004 | Gemini Awards | Viewer's Choice Award | —N/a | Nominated | |
