= Stacie Mistysyn =

American and Canadian actress (born 1971)

Stacie Mo'ana Mistysyn
- Mistysyn in 2022.
- Born: July 23, 1971 (age 55); Los Angeles, California, USA
- Years active: 1982–present
- Television: Degrassi
- Spouse: James Gallanders (since 2009)
- Children: 2
- Awards: Gemini Award for Best Performance by an Actress in a Continuing Leading Dramatic Role

Stacie Moana Mistysyn (born July 23, 1971) is an American and Canadian actress who is best known for her role as Caitlin Ryan throughout multiple incarnations of the Degrassi teen drama franchise, from Degrassi Junior High through Degrassi: The Next Generation. She previously played Lisa Canard in The Kids of Degrassi Street from 1982 to 1986.

She won a Gemini Award for Degrassi Junior High in 1989 and was nominated in 1987 and 1990. She was also named in a Young Artist Award for Outstanding Young Ensemble Cast nomination in 1990.

== Biography ==
Mistysyn was born in Los Angeles to American parents, and was raised in Toronto. As of 2005, she had dual American and Canadian citizenship, but considered herself Canadian. She auditioned for The Kids of Degrassi Street at the age of 10 after coming across an audition flyer at her school. She played the role of Lisa Canard from 1982 to 1986, when development began on Degrassi Junior High, where she opted to play a new character instead of reprising her previous role. Initially auditioning for a "rebellious, punky" character named Annie, she was instead given her own character, Caitlin Ryan, named after a relative of the show's publicist.

According to the Toronto Star, Caitlin was "arguably its most popular character, whose storylines included her questioning her sexuality, an epilepsy diagnosis and the trauma after an ex committed suicide". In 1992, Mistysyn appeared as Caitlin at Degrassi High's television movie finale, School's Out!, where she uttered the quote "You were fucking Tessa Campanelli?", the second time "fuck" was said on Canadian television after co-star Stefan Brogren moments earlier in the film. She appeared in the acclaimed 1990 Canadian film Princes in Exile.

After Degrassi, Mistysyn was accepted into Ryerson University, but chose to continue acting instead. In 1994, she starred in the television movie X-Rated, produced by the creators of Degrassi. American filmmaker Kevin Smith, a fan of the Degrassi series and of Mistysyn, wanted her to appear in 1995's Mallrats, but Universal Pictures insisted he use a better-known actress; the role Smith wanted for Mistysyn was instead given to Shannen Doherty, who is seen wearing a Degrassi jacket in the film.

In 1996, Mistysyn moved to Los Angeles to avoid typecasting. She commuted to Toronto and back for Degrassi: The Next Generation before permanently returning in 2006. Mistysyn is close friends with Degrassi co-star Amanda Stepto, and in the late 2000s the two had plans to develop their own comedy series, OverXposed, which did not come to fruition. Mistysyn and Stepto performed as DJs in Toronto in the late 2000s and early 2010s.

Mistysyn is a certified fitness coach.

== Awards and nominations ==
In 1989, Mistysyn won a Gemini Award for Best Actress in a Continuing Leading Dramatic Role for Degrassi Junior High. She was previously nominated for the award in 1987 and again in 1990, in addition to being nominated as part of an ensemble for a Young Artist Award that year.

== Personal life ==
Mistysyn attended Malvern Collegiate Institute while starring in Degrassi Junior High. She married actor James Gallanders in 2009 and has two children. In an online article for Medium, she revealed that she struggled with an eating disorder and anxiety near the end of Degrassi's run. In 1991, it was reported that Mistysyn was rehearsing as the singer of a local Toronto band previously called Dream Design.

Mistysyn had a brother, Cory, who died in 2010. Her sister Kim, who is lesbian, appeared in an episode of Degrassi Talks, discussing her sexuality.

== Filmography ==
=== Film ===
Year	Series	Role	Notes	Ref
1990	Princes in Exile	Holly		
1991	The Prom	Rebecca		
1992	School's Out!	Caitlin Ryan	TV movie	
1994	X-Rated	River Owen	TV movie	
1999	The Wrong Girl	Missy	TV movie	
1999	Picture of Priority	K.C. High		
2003	Jersey Guy	Susan		
2020	Narbo's Guide to Being a Broomhead	Self		
2024	Charlie Tango	Kim		

=== Television ===
Year	Series	Role	Notes	Ref
1982-1986	The Kids of Degrassi Street	Lisa Canard	17 episodes	
1987-1989	Degrassi Junior High	Caitlin Ryan		
1989-1991	Degrassi High	Caitlin Ryan		
1991	C.B.C's Magic Hour	Rebecca	Episode: "The Prom"	
1992	Degrassi Talks	Self	6 episodes	
1993	Under the Umbrella Tree	Megan	Episode: "Love"	
1993	Class of '96	Waitress	Episode: "Look Homeward Angela"	
1996	Weird Science	Jenny Dressen	Episode: "Family Affair"	
1998	Seven Days	Lita	Episode: "The Gettysburg Virus"	
2001-2008	Degrassi: The Next Generation	Caitlin Ryan	Main character; 69 episodes	
2003	Wild Card	Ginger	Episode: "Backstabbed"	
