= List of named minor planets: ʻ =

This is a partial list of named minor planets, containing all those starting with the letter ʻ, as of 20 March 2026. It is ordered in a case-insensitive, alphabetical manner and contains a total of 5 entries. Grey minor planets have no article and redirect to the list of minor planets instead (see List of minor planets § Main index).

== ʻ ==
- 388282 ʻAkepa
- 378002 ʻAkialoa
- 7613 ʻAkikiki
- 361267 ʻIʻiwi
- 563197 ʻIke Leʻa
- 374710 ʻOʻo
back to top

== See also ==
- List of minor planet discoverers
- List of observatory codes
- Meanings of minor planet names § Index
