= List of minor planets: 563001–564000 =

The following is a partial list of minor planets, running from minor-planet number 563001 through 564000, inclusive. The primary data for this and other partial lists is based on JPL's "Small-Body Orbital Elements" and data available from the Minor Planet Center. Critical list information is also provided by the MPC, unless otherwise specified from Lowell Observatory. A detailed description of the table's columns and additional sources are given on the main page including a complete list of every page in this series, and a statistical break-up on the dynamical classification of minor planets.

Also see the summary list of all named bodies in numerical and alphabetical order, and the corresponding naming citations for the number range of this particular list. New namings may only be added to this list after official publication, as the preannouncement of names is condemned by the Working Group for Small Bodies Nomenclature of the International Astronomical Union.

Near-Earth obj.	MBA (inner)	MBA (outer)	Centaur
Mars-crosser	MBA (middle)	Jupiter trojan	Trans-Neptunian obj.
Unclassified

== 563001–563100 ==
Designation			Discovery			Properties		Ref
Permanent	Provisional	Named after	Date	Site	Discoverer(s)	Category	Diam.	Ref
563001	2016 BP_{48}	—	April 20, 2012	Mount Lemmon	Mount Lemmon Survey	·	1.8 km	MPC · JPL
563002	2016 BS_{48}	—	April 21, 2013	Haleakala	Pan-STARRS 1	·	1.6 km	MPC · JPL
563003	2016 BU_{48}	—	January 7, 2016	Haleakala	Pan-STARRS 1	·	1.6 km	MPC · JPL
563004	2016 BH_{49}	—	April 20, 2012	Mount Lemmon	Mount Lemmon Survey	·	1.8 km	MPC · JPL
563005	2016 BJ_{49}	—	June 14, 2004	Kitt Peak	Spacewatch	EUN	1.5 km	MPC · JPL
563006	2016 BK_{49}	—	November 25, 2005	Mount Lemmon	Mount Lemmon Survey	·	2.0 km	MPC · JPL
563007	2016 BM_{49}	—	March 28, 2012	Kitt Peak	Spacewatch	·	1.6 km	MPC · JPL
563008	2016 BJ_{51}	—	October 1, 2005	Mount Lemmon	Mount Lemmon Survey	·	1.3 km	MPC · JPL
563009	2016 BT_{51}	—	January 3, 2016	Mount Lemmon	Mount Lemmon Survey	AGN	1.2 km	MPC · JPL
563010	2016 BA_{52}	—	February 28, 2012	Haleakala	Pan-STARRS 1	·	1.6 km	MPC · JPL
563011	2016 BB_{52}	—	July 7, 2014	Haleakala	Pan-STARRS 1	·	1.7 km	MPC · JPL
563012	2016 BP_{52}	—	April 11, 2008	Kitt Peak	Spacewatch	·	1.4 km	MPC · JPL
563013	2016 BU_{52}	—	October 1, 2014	Haleakala	Pan-STARRS 1	GEF	1.0 km	MPC · JPL
563014	2016 BC_{53}	—	December 21, 2006	Mount Lemmon	Mount Lemmon Survey	·	1.7 km	MPC · JPL
563015	2016 BE_{53}	—	September 19, 2014	Haleakala	Pan-STARRS 1	·	1.9 km	MPC · JPL
563016	2016 BO_{53}	—	January 27, 2007	Mount Lemmon	Mount Lemmon Survey	AGN	880 m	MPC · JPL
563017	2016 BP_{53}	—	February 21, 2012	Kitt Peak	Spacewatch	·	1.4 km	MPC · JPL
563018	2016 BU_{53}	—	January 15, 2016	Haleakala	Pan-STARRS 1	·	1.4 km	MPC · JPL
563019	2016 BG_{55}	—	March 31, 2008	Kitt Peak	Spacewatch	·	1.4 km	MPC · JPL
563020	2016 BM_{57}	—	April 14, 2008	Kitt Peak	Spacewatch	·	1.6 km	MPC · JPL
563021	2016 BP_{57}	—	September 19, 2009	Mount Lemmon	Mount Lemmon Survey	·	1.7 km	MPC · JPL
563022	2016 BT_{57}	—	October 29, 2014	Haleakala	Pan-STARRS 1	·	1.3 km	MPC · JPL
563023	2016 BJ_{58}	—	August 27, 2014	Haleakala	Pan-STARRS 1	·	1.3 km	MPC · JPL
563024	2016 BL_{58}	—	September 25, 2005	Kitt Peak	Spacewatch	·	1.5 km	MPC · JPL
563025	2016 BO_{58}	—	January 26, 2007	Kitt Peak	Spacewatch	NEM	1.9 km	MPC · JPL
563026	2016 BA_{59}	—	April 8, 2008	Kitt Peak	Spacewatch	·	1.3 km	MPC · JPL
563027	2016 BJ_{59}	—	October 3, 2014	Mount Lemmon	Mount Lemmon Survey	·	1.7 km	MPC · JPL
563028	2016 BR_{60}	—	October 30, 2010	Kitt Peak	Spacewatch	·	1.4 km	MPC · JPL
563029	2016 BA_{62}	—	October 29, 2010	Kitt Peak	Spacewatch	·	1.6 km	MPC · JPL
563030	2016 BT_{62}	—	November 24, 2006	Kitt Peak	Spacewatch	·	1.3 km	MPC · JPL
563031	2016 BV_{62}	—	February 13, 2008	Mount Lemmon	Mount Lemmon Survey	·	1.4 km	MPC · JPL
563032	2016 BX_{62}	—	January 3, 2016	Mount Lemmon	Mount Lemmon Survey	·	1.6 km	MPC · JPL
563033	2016 BQ_{63}	—	March 15, 2012	Mount Lemmon	Mount Lemmon Survey	·	1.4 km	MPC · JPL
563034	2016 BR_{63}	—	September 29, 2014	Haleakala	Pan-STARRS 1	·	1.2 km	MPC · JPL
563035	2016 BT_{63}	—	October 8, 2005	Kitt Peak	Spacewatch	·	1.2 km	MPC · JPL
563036	2016 BU_{63}	—	July 12, 2005	Kitt Peak	Spacewatch	·	1.2 km	MPC · JPL
563037	2016 BW_{63}	—	May 2, 2013	Haleakala	Pan-STARRS 1	·	1.3 km	MPC · JPL
563038	2016 BM_{65}	—	October 23, 2006	Mount Lemmon	Mount Lemmon Survey	·	2.4 km	MPC · JPL
563039	2016 BT_{65}	—	November 2, 2010	Kitt Peak	Spacewatch	·	1.6 km	MPC · JPL
563040	2016 BV_{65}	—	October 1, 2005	Mount Lemmon	Mount Lemmon Survey	·	1.5 km	MPC · JPL
563041	2016 BA_{66}	—	November 22, 2006	Mount Lemmon	Mount Lemmon Survey	·	1.4 km	MPC · JPL
563042	2016 BN_{66}	—	January 31, 2016	Mount Lemmon	Mount Lemmon Survey	·	1.6 km	MPC · JPL
563043	2016 BU_{66}	—	October 4, 2014	Mount Lemmon	Mount Lemmon Survey	·	1.8 km	MPC · JPL
563044	2016 BB_{67}	—	November 24, 2006	Kitt Peak	Spacewatch	·	1.3 km	MPC · JPL
563045	2016 BT_{67}	—	October 17, 2010	Mount Lemmon	Mount Lemmon Survey	·	1.6 km	MPC · JPL
563046	2016 BV_{68}	—	March 16, 2012	Kitt Peak	Spacewatch	·	1.4 km	MPC · JPL
563047	2016 BF_{69}	—	January 29, 2016	Mount Lemmon	Mount Lemmon Survey	·	1.1 km	MPC · JPL
563048	2016 BN_{70}	—	January 2, 2012	Mount Lemmon	Mount Lemmon Survey	MRX	1.0 km	MPC · JPL
563049	2016 BQ_{71}	—	October 29, 2005	Kitt Peak	Spacewatch	·	1.8 km	MPC · JPL
563050	2016 BX_{71}	—	February 7, 2002	Kitt Peak	Spacewatch	AGN	1.2 km	MPC · JPL
563051	2016 BP_{72}	—	August 4, 2005	Palomar	NEAT	·	1.6 km	MPC · JPL
563052	2016 BB_{73}	—	March 14, 2012	Mount Lemmon	Mount Lemmon Survey	·	1.3 km	MPC · JPL
563053	2016 BK_{73}	—	March 13, 2012	Mount Lemmon	Mount Lemmon Survey	·	1.5 km	MPC · JPL
563054	2016 BN_{73}	—	September 14, 2014	Kitt Peak	Spacewatch	·	2.2 km	MPC · JPL
563055	2016 BX_{73}	—	November 6, 2005	Kitt Peak	Spacewatch	HOF	2.1 km	MPC · JPL
563056	2016 BZ_{73}	—	June 18, 2013	Haleakala	Pan-STARRS 1	WIT	850 m	MPC · JPL
563057	2016 BM_{74}	—	August 25, 2014	Haleakala	Pan-STARRS 1	EUN	1.1 km	MPC · JPL
563058	2016 BD_{75}	—	October 2, 2014	Haleakala	Pan-STARRS 1	·	1.5 km	MPC · JPL
563059	2016 BO_{75}	—	November 1, 2014	Mount Lemmon	Mount Lemmon Survey	·	1.6 km	MPC · JPL
563060	2016 BR_{76}	—	February 24, 2007	Mount Nyukasa	Japan Aerospace Exploration Agency	·	1.6 km	MPC · JPL
563061	2016 BE_{77}	—	February 19, 2002	Kitt Peak	Spacewatch	·	1.4 km	MPC · JPL
563062	2016 BT_{77}	—	January 31, 2016	Haleakala	Pan-STARRS 1	·	800 m	MPC · JPL
563063	2016 BD_{79}	—	January 8, 2016	Haleakala	Pan-STARRS 1	·	1.0 km	MPC · JPL
563064	2016 BE_{79}	—	December 13, 2006	Kitt Peak	Spacewatch	·	1.4 km	MPC · JPL
563065	2016 BK_{79}	—	October 2, 2014	Haleakala	Pan-STARRS 1	·	1.7 km	MPC · JPL
563066	2016 BT_{79}	—	April 5, 2008	Kitt Peak	Spacewatch	·	1.4 km	MPC · JPL
563067	2016 BK_{80}	—	September 30, 2005	Kitt Peak	Spacewatch	WIT	840 m	MPC · JPL
563068	2016 BF_{81}	—	June 14, 2004	Kitt Peak	Spacewatch	·	2.7 km	MPC · JPL
563069	2016 BN_{81}	—	December 29, 2014	Haleakala	Pan-STARRS 1	·	2.6 km	MPC · JPL
563070	2016 BU_{82}	—	January 31, 2016	Haleakala	Pan-STARRS 1	H	430 m	MPC · JPL
563071	2016 BJ_{83}	—	January 18, 2016	Haleakala	Pan-STARRS 1	H	360 m	MPC · JPL
563072	2016 BQ_{83}	—	April 27, 2011	Socorro	LINEAR	H	460 m	MPC · JPL
563073	2016 BN_{84}	—	January 27, 2007	Mount Lemmon	Mount Lemmon Survey	·	1.9 km	MPC · JPL
563074	2016 BM_{88}	—	November 25, 2005	Kitt Peak	Spacewatch	·	2.0 km	MPC · JPL
563075	2016 BZ_{88}	—	September 22, 2009	Mount Lemmon	Mount Lemmon Survey	KOR	1.1 km	MPC · JPL
563076	2016 BH_{89}	—	January 16, 2016	Haleakala	Pan-STARRS 1	HNS	990 m	MPC · JPL
563077	2016 BK_{89}	—	March 12, 2007	Mount Lemmon	Mount Lemmon Survey	AGN	920 m	MPC · JPL
563078	2016 BL_{89}	—	January 10, 2007	Mount Lemmon	Mount Lemmon Survey	·	1.1 km	MPC · JPL
563079	2016 BM_{89}	—	March 20, 2007	Mount Lemmon	Mount Lemmon Survey	·	1.5 km	MPC · JPL
563080	2016 BW_{89}	—	August 15, 2009	Kitt Peak	Spacewatch	·	1.8 km	MPC · JPL
563081	2016 BX_{89}	—	October 1, 2014	Haleakala	Pan-STARRS 1	·	1.2 km	MPC · JPL
563082	2016 BY_{89}	—	January 10, 2007	Mount Lemmon	Mount Lemmon Survey	WIT	930 m	MPC · JPL
563083	2016 BC_{90}	—	September 13, 2007	Catalina	CSS	·	3.8 km	MPC · JPL
563084	2016 BN_{90}	—	February 10, 2011	Mount Lemmon	Mount Lemmon Survey	·	1.4 km	MPC · JPL
563085	2016 BR_{90}	—	May 6, 2006	Kitt Peak	Spacewatch	·	2.0 km	MPC · JPL
563086	2016 BE_{91}	—	October 17, 2010	Mount Lemmon	Mount Lemmon Survey	·	1.3 km	MPC · JPL
563087	2016 BF_{91}	—	August 31, 2013	Haleakala	Pan-STARRS 1	·	2.3 km	MPC · JPL
563088	2016 BH_{91}	—	May 21, 2011	Mount Lemmon	Mount Lemmon Survey	·	3.8 km	MPC · JPL
563089	2016 BR_{91}	—	December 1, 2010	Mount Lemmon	Mount Lemmon Survey	·	1.4 km	MPC · JPL
563090	2016 BU_{91}	—	August 3, 2014	Haleakala	Pan-STARRS 1	EUN	950 m	MPC · JPL
563091	2016 BW_{91}	—	November 28, 2005	Mount Lemmon	Mount Lemmon Survey	BRA	1.5 km	MPC · JPL
563092	2016 BX_{91}	—	January 16, 2016	Haleakala	Pan-STARRS 1	EOS	1.5 km	MPC · JPL
563093	2016 BE_{92}	—	January 17, 2016	Haleakala	Pan-STARRS 1	·	2.5 km	MPC · JPL
563094	2016 BU_{92}	—	March 27, 2012	Kitt Peak	Spacewatch	·	1.3 km	MPC · JPL
563095	2016 BY_{92}	—	January 18, 2016	Haleakala	Pan-STARRS 1	·	2.0 km	MPC · JPL
563096	2016 BL_{93}	—	October 1, 2014	Haleakala	Pan-STARRS 1	·	2.0 km	MPC · JPL
563097	2016 BS_{93}	—	September 28, 2008	Catalina	CSS	EOS	1.9 km	MPC · JPL
563098	2016 BX_{93}	—	August 26, 2013	Haleakala	Pan-STARRS 1	·	2.2 km	MPC · JPL
563099	2016 BY_{93}	—	April 1, 2011	Kitt Peak	Spacewatch	·	2.0 km	MPC · JPL
563100	2016 BM_{94}	—	January 30, 2012	Mount Lemmon	Mount Lemmon Survey	KRM	1.5 km	MPC · JPL

== 563101–563200 ==
back to top

Designation			Discovery			Properties		Ref
Permanent	Provisional	Named after	Date	Site	Discoverer(s)	Category	Diam.	Ref
563101	2016 BB_{95}	—	October 21, 2006	Kitt Peak	Spacewatch	·	930 m	MPC · JPL
563102	2016 BF_{95}	—	November 2, 2010	Mount Lemmon	Mount Lemmon Survey	EUN	1.2 km	MPC · JPL
563103	2016 BN_{95}	—	April 11, 2007	Kitt Peak	Spacewatch	·	1.7 km	MPC · JPL
563104	2016 BQ_{95}	—	April 2, 2011	Haleakala	Pan-STARRS 1	·	2.4 km	MPC · JPL
563105	2016 BT_{95}	—	March 11, 2005	Kitt Peak	Spacewatch	·	3.2 km	MPC · JPL
563106	2016 BD_{96}	—	November 28, 2014	Mount Lemmon	Mount Lemmon Survey	EOS	2.3 km	MPC · JPL
563107	2016 BG_{96}	—	February 4, 2012	Haleakala	Pan-STARRS 1	·	1.2 km	MPC · JPL
563108	2016 BK_{98}	—	November 28, 2014	Haleakala	Pan-STARRS 1	EUN	980 m	MPC · JPL
563109	2016 BQ_{98}	—	December 19, 2009	Kitt Peak	Spacewatch	·	2.2 km	MPC · JPL
563110	2016 BR_{98}	—	January 17, 2016	Haleakala	Pan-STARRS 1	·	2.7 km	MPC · JPL
563111	2016 BS_{98}	—	October 23, 2008	Kitt Peak	Spacewatch	·	2.7 km	MPC · JPL
563112	2016 BU_{98}	—	October 26, 2008	Kitt Peak	Spacewatch	EOS	2.1 km	MPC · JPL
563113	2016 BW_{98}	—	January 17, 2016	Haleakala	Pan-STARRS 1	·	2.9 km	MPC · JPL
563114	2016 BG_{99}	—	January 7, 2010	Kitt Peak	Spacewatch	EOS	1.5 km	MPC · JPL
563115	2016 BH_{99}	—	November 27, 2014	Mount Lemmon	Mount Lemmon Survey	·	1.9 km	MPC · JPL
563116	2016 BU_{99}	—	August 22, 2014	Haleakala	Pan-STARRS 1	·	790 m	MPC · JPL
563117	2016 BX_{99}	—	May 12, 2013	Haleakala	Pan-STARRS 1	·	1.1 km	MPC · JPL
563118	2016 BU_{100}	—	November 6, 2005	Kitt Peak	Spacewatch	·	1.6 km	MPC · JPL
563119	2016 BZ_{100}	—	December 20, 2014	Haleakala	Pan-STARRS 1	·	1.7 km	MPC · JPL
563120	2016 BG_{101}	—	October 21, 2014	Mount Lemmon	Mount Lemmon Survey	·	1.6 km	MPC · JPL
563121	2016 BM_{101}	—	November 17, 2014	Haleakala	Pan-STARRS 1	·	1.8 km	MPC · JPL
563122	2016 BT_{102}	—	July 31, 2011	Haleakala	Pan-STARRS 1	T_{j} (2.99) · EUP	3.0 km	MPC · JPL
563123	2016 BA_{103}	—	August 23, 2014	Haleakala	Pan-STARRS 1	·	1.5 km	MPC · JPL
563124	2016 BM_{103}	—	March 15, 2012	Mount Lemmon	Mount Lemmon Survey	·	1.3 km	MPC · JPL
563125	2016 BN_{103}	—	September 18, 2014	Haleakala	Pan-STARRS 1	·	1.3 km	MPC · JPL
563126	2016 BV_{104}	—	October 14, 2014	Kitt Peak	Spacewatch	HOF	2.1 km	MPC · JPL
563127	2016 BT_{106}	—	January 31, 2016	Mount Lemmon	Mount Lemmon Survey	·	1.5 km	MPC · JPL
563128	2016 BC_{113}	—	January 31, 2016	Haleakala	Pan-STARRS 1	AGN	910 m	MPC · JPL
563129	2016 BO_{116}	—	January 18, 2016	Haleakala	Pan-STARRS 1	·	1.9 km	MPC · JPL
563130	2016 BD_{123}	—	January 17, 2016	Haleakala	Pan-STARRS 1	·	1.9 km	MPC · JPL
563131	2016 BE_{123}	—	January 18, 2016	Haleakala	Pan-STARRS 1	·	1.7 km	MPC · JPL
563132	2016 CH	—	July 1, 2005	Kitt Peak	Spacewatch	·	2.1 km	MPC · JPL
563133	2016 CA_{1}	—	January 5, 2002	Kitt Peak	Spacewatch	·	1.5 km	MPC · JPL
563134	2016 CP_{3}	—	March 29, 2012	Haleakala	Pan-STARRS 1	·	1.4 km	MPC · JPL
563135	2016 CT_{3}	—	March 25, 2012	Mount Lemmon	Mount Lemmon Survey	·	2.0 km	MPC · JPL
563136	2016 CY_{6}	—	January 28, 2007	Mount Lemmon	Mount Lemmon Survey	·	1.6 km	MPC · JPL
563137	2016 CF_{7}	—	January 10, 2007	Mount Lemmon	Mount Lemmon Survey	ADE	1.6 km	MPC · JPL
563138	2016 CZ_{8}	—	August 17, 2009	Kitt Peak	Spacewatch	MAR	1.2 km	MPC · JPL
563139	2016 CM_{9}	—	February 21, 2012	Mount Lemmon	Mount Lemmon Survey	·	1.7 km	MPC · JPL
563140	2016 CS_{10}	—	September 22, 2009	Catalina	CSS	·	2.1 km	MPC · JPL
563141	2016 CX_{10}	—	September 15, 2009	Kitt Peak	Spacewatch	·	2.0 km	MPC · JPL
563142	2016 CB_{11}	—	February 16, 2007	Charleston	R. Holmes	·	2.0 km	MPC · JPL
563143	2016 CK_{11}	—	September 19, 2014	Haleakala	Pan-STARRS 1	GEF	1.1 km	MPC · JPL
563144	2016 CM_{11}	—	August 20, 2009	La Sagra	OAM	·	2.3 km	MPC · JPL
563145	2016 CO_{11}	—	February 27, 2006	Mount Lemmon	Mount Lemmon Survey	·	1.2 km	MPC · JPL
563146	2016 CS_{11}	—	October 25, 2001	Apache Point	SDSS Collaboration	·	1.4 km	MPC · JPL
563147	2016 CV_{11}	—	January 19, 2007	Mauna Kea	P. A. Wiegert	·	1.3 km	MPC · JPL
563148	2016 CP_{12}	—	February 8, 2002	Kitt Peak	Spacewatch	HOF	2.5 km	MPC · JPL
563149	2016 CS_{12}	—	July 29, 2009	Kitt Peak	Spacewatch	NEM	2.1 km	MPC · JPL
563150	2016 CB_{13}	—	November 6, 2005	Mount Lemmon	Mount Lemmon Survey	HOF	2.8 km	MPC · JPL
563151	2016 CT_{14}	—	February 9, 2008	Kitt Peak	Spacewatch	·	1.5 km	MPC · JPL
563152	2016 CF_{15}	—	December 8, 2015	Haleakala	Pan-STARRS 1	H	470 m	MPC · JPL
563153	2016 CE_{16}	—	October 28, 2014	Haleakala	Pan-STARRS 1	·	1.7 km	MPC · JPL
563154	2016 CM_{16}	—	March 11, 2008	Kitt Peak	Spacewatch	·	1.2 km	MPC · JPL
563155	2016 CP_{16}	—	April 11, 2008	Kitt Peak	Spacewatch	·	1.5 km	MPC · JPL
563156	2016 CH_{17}	—	November 1, 2005	Kitt Peak	Spacewatch	AGN	890 m	MPC · JPL
563157	2016 CX_{17}	—	July 28, 2014	Haleakala	Pan-STARRS 1	EUN	970 m	MPC · JPL
563158	2016 CY_{17}	—	January 28, 2000	Kitt Peak	Spacewatch	·	2.9 km	MPC · JPL
563159	2016 CS_{18}	—	February 27, 2012	Kitt Peak	Spacewatch	·	1.1 km	MPC · JPL
563160	2016 CA_{19}	—	December 6, 2015	Haleakala	Pan-STARRS 1	·	1.8 km	MPC · JPL
563161	2016 CG_{19}	—	September 23, 2014	Haleakala	Pan-STARRS 1	EOS	1.7 km	MPC · JPL
563162	2016 CA_{20}	—	March 28, 2012	Kitt Peak	Spacewatch	·	2.0 km	MPC · JPL
563163	2016 CY_{20}	—	August 29, 2009	Bergisch Gladbach	W. Bickel	·	2.0 km	MPC · JPL
563164	2016 CF_{21}	—	September 10, 2010	Front Royal	Skillman, D.	(5)	1.1 km	MPC · JPL
563165	2016 CK_{21}	—	January 8, 1999	Kitt Peak	Spacewatch	·	1.1 km	MPC · JPL
563166	2016 CY_{21}	—	September 1, 2005	Palomar	NEAT	·	1.9 km	MPC · JPL
563167	2016 CR_{22}	—	January 27, 2007	Mount Lemmon	Mount Lemmon Survey	·	1.5 km	MPC · JPL
563168	2016 CE_{23}	—	October 29, 2005	Kitt Peak	Spacewatch	HOF	2.3 km	MPC · JPL
563169	2016 CX_{23}	—	September 30, 2009	Mount Lemmon	Mount Lemmon Survey	·	2.2 km	MPC · JPL
563170	2016 CM_{25}	—	August 3, 2014	Haleakala	Pan-STARRS 1	EUN	1.1 km	MPC · JPL
563171	2016 CD_{26}	—	August 23, 2014	Haleakala	Pan-STARRS 1	·	1.9 km	MPC · JPL
563172	2016 CL_{27}	—	December 13, 2006	Kitt Peak	Spacewatch	·	1.1 km	MPC · JPL
563173	2016 CT_{27}	—	January 13, 2016	Haleakala	Pan-STARRS 1	·	1.4 km	MPC · JPL
563174	2016 CH_{28}	—	April 20, 2006	Kitt Peak	Spacewatch	·	3.6 km	MPC · JPL
563175	2016 CX_{28}	—	September 27, 2005	Palomar	NEAT	·	2.0 km	MPC · JPL
563176	2016 CO_{31}	—	January 20, 2016	Haleakala	Pan-STARRS 1	H	420 m	MPC · JPL
563177	2016 CY_{32}	—	July 29, 2008	Mount Lemmon	Mount Lemmon Survey	·	2.1 km	MPC · JPL
563178	2016 CR_{33}	—	September 30, 2005	Mount Lemmon	Mount Lemmon Survey	·	1.5 km	MPC · JPL
563179	2016 CU_{33}	—	October 17, 2010	Mount Lemmon	Mount Lemmon Survey	·	1.6 km	MPC · JPL
563180	2016 CL_{34}	—	November 1, 2014	Mount Lemmon	Mount Lemmon Survey	·	2.2 km	MPC · JPL
563181	2016 CT_{34}	—	February 20, 2012	Haleakala	Pan-STARRS 1	·	1.6 km	MPC · JPL
563182	2016 CU_{34}	—	November 27, 2006	Mount Lemmon	Mount Lemmon Survey	·	1.5 km	MPC · JPL
563183	2016 CZ_{34}	—	October 9, 2010	Mount Lemmon	Mount Lemmon Survey	·	1.0 km	MPC · JPL
563184	2016 CF_{35}	—	December 25, 2010	Kitt Peak	Spacewatch	·	1.8 km	MPC · JPL
563185	2016 CN_{35}	—	March 6, 2011	Mount Lemmon	Mount Lemmon Survey	·	1.7 km	MPC · JPL
563186	2016 CV_{35}	—	September 20, 2014	Haleakala	Pan-STARRS 1	·	1.2 km	MPC · JPL
563187	2016 CM_{36}	—	November 25, 2010	Mount Lemmon	Mount Lemmon Survey	·	1.2 km	MPC · JPL
563188	2016 CO_{36}	—	August 15, 2009	Kitt Peak	Spacewatch	MRX	1.2 km	MPC · JPL
563189	2016 CU_{36}	—	January 7, 2016	Haleakala	Pan-STARRS 1	·	1.3 km	MPC · JPL
563190	2016 CV_{37}	—	August 30, 2005	Kitt Peak	Spacewatch	MRX	890 m	MPC · JPL
563191	2016 CX_{38}	—	August 30, 2014	Haleakala	Pan-STARRS 1	·	1.4 km	MPC · JPL
563192	2016 CF_{39}	—	September 20, 2014	Haleakala	Pan-STARRS 1	·	1.7 km	MPC · JPL
563193	2016 CY_{39}	—	January 27, 2007	Kitt Peak	Spacewatch	·	1.5 km	MPC · JPL
563194	2016 CD_{40}	—	November 1, 2014	Mount Lemmon	Mount Lemmon Survey	·	2.2 km	MPC · JPL
563195	2016 CK_{40}	—	August 19, 2014	Haleakala	Pan-STARRS 1	·	1.7 km	MPC · JPL
563196	2016 CO_{40}	—	November 4, 2005	Mount Lemmon	Mount Lemmon Survey	HOF	2.1 km	MPC · JPL
563197 ʻIke Leʻa	2016 CL_{41}	ʻIke Leʻa	April 12, 2012	Haleakala	Pan-STARRS 1	HOF	2.0 km	MPC · JPL
563198	2016 CG_{42}	—	January 14, 2002	Palomar	NEAT	·	1.4 km	MPC · JPL
563199	2016 CV_{42}	—	January 11, 2011	Kitt Peak	Spacewatch	·	1.6 km	MPC · JPL
563200	2016 CX_{42}	—	February 8, 2007	Kitt Peak	Spacewatch	·	1.7 km	MPC · JPL

== 563201–563300 ==
back to top

Designation			Discovery			Properties		Ref
Permanent	Provisional	Named after	Date	Site	Discoverer(s)	Category	Diam.	Ref
563201	2016 CY_{42}	—	November 12, 2005	Kitt Peak	Spacewatch	·	1.7 km	MPC · JPL
563202	2016 CA_{43}	—	August 27, 2005	Palomar	NEAT	·	1.3 km	MPC · JPL
563203	2016 CE_{43}	—	January 14, 2016	Haleakala	Pan-STARRS 1	·	1.2 km	MPC · JPL
563204	2016 CK_{43}	—	September 19, 2014	Haleakala	Pan-STARRS 1	·	1.3 km	MPC · JPL
563205	2016 CW_{45}	—	February 28, 2012	Haleakala	Pan-STARRS 1	PAD	1.3 km	MPC · JPL
563206	2016 CO_{47}	—	June 18, 2013	Haleakala	Pan-STARRS 1	·	1.3 km	MPC · JPL
563207	2016 CZ_{47}	—	September 15, 2009	Kitt Peak	Spacewatch	·	2.0 km	MPC · JPL
563208	2016 CU_{48}	—	November 25, 2005	Kitt Peak	Spacewatch	·	1.7 km	MPC · JPL
563209	2016 CW_{48}	—	September 27, 2009	Mount Lemmon	Mount Lemmon Survey	HOF	2.0 km	MPC · JPL
563210	2016 CE_{49}	—	January 17, 2007	Catalina	CSS	·	1.5 km	MPC · JPL
563211	2016 CN_{53}	—	August 28, 2014	Haleakala	Pan-STARRS 1	·	970 m	MPC · JPL
563212	2016 CA_{54}	—	July 14, 2013	Haleakala	Pan-STARRS 1	BRA	1.8 km	MPC · JPL
563213	2016 CB_{54}	—	January 9, 2016	Haleakala	Pan-STARRS 1	·	1.9 km	MPC · JPL
563214	2016 CN_{54}	—	February 26, 2012	Kitt Peak	Spacewatch	·	1.4 km	MPC · JPL
563215	2016 CS_{55}	—	May 27, 2012	Mount Lemmon	Mount Lemmon Survey	·	1.7 km	MPC · JPL
563216	2016 CX_{55}	—	October 29, 2014	Haleakala	Pan-STARRS 1	·	1.3 km	MPC · JPL
563217	2016 CA_{56}	—	September 29, 2005	Mount Lemmon	Mount Lemmon Survey	·	1.5 km	MPC · JPL
563218	2016 CB_{56}	—	April 13, 2012	Haleakala	Pan-STARRS 1	·	1.5 km	MPC · JPL
563219	2016 CW_{56}	—	October 12, 2007	Mount Lemmon	Mount Lemmon Survey	V	430 m	MPC · JPL
563220	2016 CR_{57}	—	June 18, 2013	Haleakala	Pan-STARRS 1	·	1.4 km	MPC · JPL
563221	2016 CG_{58}	—	November 7, 2010	Mount Lemmon	Mount Lemmon Survey	·	1.5 km	MPC · JPL
563222	2016 CU_{58}	—	January 14, 2011	Mount Lemmon	Mount Lemmon Survey	·	2.1 km	MPC · JPL
563223	2016 CZ_{58}	—	September 20, 2009	Mount Lemmon	Mount Lemmon Survey	·	2.1 km	MPC · JPL
563224	2016 CL_{60}	—	June 21, 2009	Mount Lemmon	Mount Lemmon Survey	·	1.9 km	MPC · JPL
563225	2016 CU_{60}	—	January 3, 2016	Haleakala	Pan-STARRS 1	MAR	960 m	MPC · JPL
563226	2016 CY_{60}	—	January 8, 2016	Haleakala	Pan-STARRS 1	·	1.7 km	MPC · JPL
563227	2016 CK_{61}	—	January 10, 2007	Kitt Peak	Spacewatch	·	1.4 km	MPC · JPL
563228	2016 CD_{62}	—	April 16, 2008	Mount Lemmon	Mount Lemmon Survey	EUN	1.0 km	MPC · JPL
563229	2016 CV_{62}	—	December 10, 2002	Palomar	NEAT	(5)	1.3 km	MPC · JPL
563230	2016 CZ_{62}	—	December 9, 2010	Kitt Peak	Spacewatch	NEM	2.1 km	MPC · JPL
563231	2016 CT_{65}	—	September 17, 2009	Catalina	CSS	GAL	1.5 km	MPC · JPL
563232	2016 CY_{65}	—	September 21, 2009	Mount Lemmon	Mount Lemmon Survey	·	1.5 km	MPC · JPL
563233	2016 CJ_{67}	—	March 16, 2012	Haleakala	Pan-STARRS 1	·	2.0 km	MPC · JPL
563234	2016 CP_{67}	—	March 16, 2012	Mount Lemmon	Mount Lemmon Survey	·	1.4 km	MPC · JPL
563235	2016 CQ_{67}	—	March 27, 2012	Mount Lemmon	Mount Lemmon Survey	·	1.4 km	MPC · JPL
563236	2016 CH_{68}	—	November 26, 2014	Mount Lemmon	Mount Lemmon Survey	·	2.5 km	MPC · JPL
563237	2016 CT_{68}	—	April 1, 2012	Mount Lemmon	Mount Lemmon Survey	·	1.8 km	MPC · JPL
563238	2016 CK_{69}	—	June 18, 2006	Kitt Peak	Spacewatch	·	3.8 km	MPC · JPL
563239	2016 CO_{69}	—	October 26, 2009	Kitt Peak	Spacewatch	·	2.1 km	MPC · JPL
563240	2016 CB_{70}	—	November 10, 2009	Kitt Peak	Spacewatch	·	2.0 km	MPC · JPL
563241	2016 CM_{70}	—	January 13, 2002	Palomar	NEAT	(32418)	1.5 km	MPC · JPL
563242	2016 CW_{70}	—	February 8, 2007	Mount Lemmon	Mount Lemmon Survey	·	2.7 km	MPC · JPL
563243	2016 CY_{70}	—	August 30, 2005	Kitt Peak	Spacewatch	·	1.5 km	MPC · JPL
563244	2016 CQ_{71}	—	November 10, 2010	Mount Lemmon	Mount Lemmon Survey	·	1.3 km	MPC · JPL
563245	2016 CC_{72}	—	February 10, 2008	Kitt Peak	Spacewatch	·	1.4 km	MPC · JPL
563246	2016 CE_{72}	—	October 11, 2002	Palomar	NEAT	·	1.3 km	MPC · JPL
563247	2016 CT_{73}	—	October 28, 2014	Haleakala	Pan-STARRS 1	·	1.5 km	MPC · JPL
563248	2016 CW_{73}	—	July 14, 2013	Haleakala	Pan-STARRS 1	·	1.5 km	MPC · JPL
563249	2016 CB_{74}	—	November 7, 2007	Mount Lemmon	Mount Lemmon Survey	·	1.0 km	MPC · JPL
563250	2016 CJ_{75}	—	October 1, 2014	Haleakala	Pan-STARRS 1	·	1.4 km	MPC · JPL
563251	2016 CL_{75}	—	October 29, 2014	Haleakala	Pan-STARRS 1	·	1.9 km	MPC · JPL
563252	2016 CM_{76}	—	November 8, 2015	Mount Lemmon	Mount Lemmon Survey	·	2.1 km	MPC · JPL
563253	2016 CN_{76}	—	August 20, 2014	Haleakala	Pan-STARRS 1	·	1.2 km	MPC · JPL
563254	2016 CA_{77}	—	August 4, 2005	Palomar	NEAT	·	1.2 km	MPC · JPL
563255	2016 CS_{77}	—	November 5, 2010	Kitt Peak	Spacewatch	·	1.1 km	MPC · JPL
563256	2016 CX_{77}	—	August 16, 2009	Kitt Peak	Spacewatch	·	1.3 km	MPC · JPL
563257	2016 CL_{78}	—	July 17, 2004	Cerro Tololo	Deep Ecliptic Survey	·	1.8 km	MPC · JPL
563258	2016 CU_{79}	—	December 10, 2010	Mount Lemmon	Mount Lemmon Survey	ADE	1.5 km	MPC · JPL
563259	2016 CW_{79}	—	May 15, 2013	Haleakala	Pan-STARRS 1	·	1.2 km	MPC · JPL
563260	2016 CH_{80}	—	February 28, 2012	Haleakala	Pan-STARRS 1	·	1.5 km	MPC · JPL
563261	2016 CM_{84}	—	September 30, 2010	Mount Lemmon	Mount Lemmon Survey	·	1.2 km	MPC · JPL
563262	2016 CX_{85}	—	September 19, 2014	Haleakala	Pan-STARRS 1	·	1.3 km	MPC · JPL
563263	2016 CZ_{85}	—	October 11, 2005	Kitt Peak	Spacewatch	MRX	860 m	MPC · JPL
563264	2016 CB_{86}	—	January 29, 2011	Mount Lemmon	Mount Lemmon Survey	·	1.3 km	MPC · JPL
563265	2016 CG_{88}	—	September 6, 2013	Mount Lemmon	Mount Lemmon Survey	·	2.1 km	MPC · JPL
563266	2016 CY_{89}	—	October 27, 2014	Haleakala	Pan-STARRS 1	·	940 m	MPC · JPL
563267	2016 CL_{90}	—	February 28, 2012	Haleakala	Pan-STARRS 1	·	1.3 km	MPC · JPL
563268	2016 CS_{93}	—	November 25, 2005	Mount Lemmon	Mount Lemmon Survey	·	2.0 km	MPC · JPL
563269	2016 CC_{94}	—	October 29, 2010	Kitt Peak	Spacewatch	·	1.5 km	MPC · JPL
563270	2016 CR_{94}	—	February 28, 2008	Kitt Peak	Spacewatch	·	950 m	MPC · JPL
563271	2016 CV_{94}	—	October 24, 2009	Kitt Peak	Spacewatch	·	1.9 km	MPC · JPL
563272	2016 CO_{96}	—	December 2, 2010	Mayhill-ISON	L. Elenin	·	1.7 km	MPC · JPL
563273	2016 CD_{97}	—	September 25, 2014	Mount Lemmon	Mount Lemmon Survey	EUN	920 m	MPC · JPL
563274	2016 CP_{98}	—	November 10, 2010	Mount Lemmon	Mount Lemmon Survey	·	1.4 km	MPC · JPL
563275	2016 CA_{100}	—	July 15, 2013	Haleakala	Pan-STARRS 1	·	1.9 km	MPC · JPL
563276	2016 CF_{102}	—	November 1, 2005	Kitt Peak	Spacewatch	GEF	1.0 km	MPC · JPL
563277	2016 CL_{102}	—	November 2, 2010	Mount Lemmon	Mount Lemmon Survey	·	820 m	MPC · JPL
563278	2016 CW_{102}	—	March 16, 2007	Kitt Peak	Spacewatch	·	1.4 km	MPC · JPL
563279	2016 CE_{104}	—	November 21, 2001	Apache Point	SDSS	·	1.8 km	MPC · JPL
563280	2016 CN_{104}	—	November 17, 2014	Mount Lemmon	Mount Lemmon Survey	·	1.6 km	MPC · JPL
563281	2016 CP_{105}	—	June 20, 2013	Haleakala	Pan-STARRS 1	·	1.3 km	MPC · JPL
563282	2016 CE_{106}	—	August 31, 2005	Kitt Peak	Spacewatch	·	1.4 km	MPC · JPL
563283	2016 CU_{106}	—	May 5, 2008	Mount Lemmon	Mount Lemmon Survey	·	1.5 km	MPC · JPL
563284	2016 CA_{107}	—	March 19, 2007	Mount Lemmon	Mount Lemmon Survey	·	1.9 km	MPC · JPL
563285 Reinerschwarz	2016 CS_{107}	Reinerschwarz	March 23, 2007	Mauna Kea	D. D. Balam, K. M. Perrett	·	1.4 km	MPC · JPL
563286	2016 CW_{107}	—	August 27, 2009	Catalina	CSS	·	2.0 km	MPC · JPL
563287	2016 CE_{108}	—	March 17, 2012	Mount Lemmon	Mount Lemmon Survey	·	1.3 km	MPC · JPL
563288	2016 CO_{108}	—	January 7, 2016	Haleakala	Pan-STARRS 1	EUN	960 m	MPC · JPL
563289	2016 CS_{108}	—	August 27, 2014	Haleakala	Pan-STARRS 1	EUN	820 m	MPC · JPL
563290	2016 CA_{109}	—	September 25, 2006	Kitt Peak	Spacewatch	·	920 m	MPC · JPL
563291	2016 CJ_{109}	—	January 20, 2009	Mount Lemmon	Mount Lemmon Survey	·	750 m	MPC · JPL
563292	2016 CH_{110}	—	February 27, 2012	Haleakala	Pan-STARRS 1	·	1.5 km	MPC · JPL
563293	2016 CX_{110}	—	October 29, 2005	Mount Lemmon	Mount Lemmon Survey	·	2.0 km	MPC · JPL
563294	2016 CZ_{113}	—	July 8, 2013	Haleakala	Pan-STARRS 1	·	1.1 km	MPC · JPL
563295	2016 CC_{114}	—	September 17, 2014	Haleakala	Pan-STARRS 1	·	1.5 km	MPC · JPL
563296	2016 CY_{114}	—	November 1, 2014	Mount Lemmon	Mount Lemmon Survey	·	2.2 km	MPC · JPL
563297	2016 CG_{116}	—	October 6, 2008	Mount Lemmon	Mount Lemmon Survey	·	2.2 km	MPC · JPL
563298	2016 CT_{116}	—	August 18, 2006	Kitt Peak	Spacewatch	·	1.2 km	MPC · JPL
563299	2016 CE_{117}	—	November 17, 2009	Mount Lemmon	Mount Lemmon Survey	·	2.4 km	MPC · JPL
563300	2016 CT_{117}	—	September 30, 2009	Mount Lemmon	Mount Lemmon Survey	·	1.7 km	MPC · JPL

== 563301–563400 ==
back to top

Designation			Discovery			Properties		Ref
Permanent	Provisional	Named after	Date	Site	Discoverer(s)	Category	Diam.	Ref
563301	2016 CK_{118}	—	June 17, 2013	Haleakala	Pan-STARRS 1	ADE	1.5 km	MPC · JPL
563302	2016 CO_{119}	—	October 27, 2005	Kitt Peak	Spacewatch	·	1.9 km	MPC · JPL
563303	2016 CE_{121}	—	April 11, 2012	Mount Lemmon	Mount Lemmon Survey	·	1.5 km	MPC · JPL
563304	2016 CR_{124}	—	November 17, 2014	Haleakala	Pan-STARRS 1	·	1.5 km	MPC · JPL
563305	2016 CA_{125}	—	October 24, 1995	Kitt Peak	Spacewatch	·	1.5 km	MPC · JPL
563306	2016 CL_{126}	—	December 8, 2010	Kitt Peak	Spacewatch	·	2.7 km	MPC · JPL
563307	2016 CG_{128}	—	September 2, 2014	Haleakala	Pan-STARRS 1	·	1.4 km	MPC · JPL
563308	2016 CH_{128}	—	December 13, 2010	Mount Lemmon	Mount Lemmon Survey	·	1.4 km	MPC · JPL
563309	2016 CF_{129}	—	February 27, 2012	Haleakala	Pan-STARRS 1	·	1.4 km	MPC · JPL
563310	2016 CO_{130}	—	February 17, 2007	Mount Lemmon	Mount Lemmon Survey	·	1.6 km	MPC · JPL
563311	2016 CC_{131}	—	February 21, 2007	Kitt Peak	Spacewatch	·	1.6 km	MPC · JPL
563312	2016 CY_{138}	—	March 27, 2012	Mount Lemmon	Mount Lemmon Survey	EUN	980 m	MPC · JPL
563313	2016 CZ_{138}	—	March 23, 2003	Apache Point	SDSS Collaboration	ADE	1.5 km	MPC · JPL
563314	2016 CL_{141}	—	August 25, 2014	Haleakala	Pan-STARRS 1	·	1.0 km	MPC · JPL
563315	2016 CP_{142}	—	September 10, 2013	Haleakala	Pan-STARRS 1	·	3.7 km	MPC · JPL
563316	2016 CP_{143}	—	February 9, 2011	Mount Lemmon	Mount Lemmon Survey	·	1.9 km	MPC · JPL
563317	2016 CU_{143}	—	January 16, 2005	Kitt Peak	Spacewatch	EOS	2.1 km	MPC · JPL
563318 ten Kate	2016 CD_{144}	ten Kate	October 27, 2014	Piszkéstető	M. Langbroek, K. Sárneczky	HOF	2.4 km	MPC · JPL
563319	2016 CL_{144}	—	May 28, 2012	Kitt Peak	Spacewatch	·	1.7 km	MPC · JPL
563320	2016 CT_{144}	—	November 16, 2014	Haleakala	Pan-STARRS 1	·	1.6 km	MPC · JPL
563321	2016 CB_{145}	—	January 19, 2012	Haleakala	Pan-STARRS 1	·	910 m	MPC · JPL
563322	2016 CC_{145}	—	March 16, 2012	Haleakala	Pan-STARRS 1	·	2.0 km	MPC · JPL
563323	2016 CA_{146}	—	May 26, 2003	Kitt Peak	Spacewatch	·	1.4 km	MPC · JPL
563324	2016 CN_{146}	—	November 20, 2001	Socorro	LINEAR	·	1.5 km	MPC · JPL
563325	2016 CB_{149}	—	August 20, 2004	Kitt Peak	Spacewatch	·	1.5 km	MPC · JPL
563326	2016 CA_{150}	—	January 23, 2006	Kitt Peak	Spacewatch	·	2.2 km	MPC · JPL
563327	2016 CM_{151}	—	October 11, 2005	Kitt Peak	Spacewatch	·	1.3 km	MPC · JPL
563328	2016 CO_{152}	—	December 24, 2006	Kitt Peak	Spacewatch	·	1.4 km	MPC · JPL
563329	2016 CJ_{153}	—	January 4, 2016	Haleakala	Pan-STARRS 1	·	1.2 km	MPC · JPL
563330	2016 CZ_{154}	—	November 30, 2005	Mount Lemmon	Mount Lemmon Survey	·	1.4 km	MPC · JPL
563331	2016 CE_{155}	—	February 21, 2007	Kitt Peak	Spacewatch	·	1.7 km	MPC · JPL
563332	2016 CQ_{155}	—	December 2, 2005	Kitt Peak	Spacewatch	HOF	2.4 km	MPC · JPL
563333	2016 CR_{155}	—	February 23, 2007	Kitt Peak	Spacewatch	·	1.8 km	MPC · JPL
563334	2016 CL_{156}	—	November 5, 2010	Mount Lemmon	Mount Lemmon Survey	·	1.3 km	MPC · JPL
563335	2016 CH_{157}	—	September 24, 2009	Mount Lemmon	Mount Lemmon Survey	·	1.6 km	MPC · JPL
563336	2016 CJ_{157}	—	October 25, 2014	Mount Lemmon	Mount Lemmon Survey	·	1.1 km	MPC · JPL
563337	2016 CL_{157}	—	October 24, 2003	Anderson Mesa	LONEOS	·	1.2 km	MPC · JPL
563338	2016 CG_{159}	—	October 1, 2014	Haleakala	Pan-STARRS 1	HOF	1.9 km	MPC · JPL
563339	2016 CQ_{159}	—	August 28, 2009	Kitt Peak	Spacewatch	HOF	1.9 km	MPC · JPL
563340	2016 CH_{160}	—	March 9, 2007	Mount Lemmon	Mount Lemmon Survey	·	1.7 km	MPC · JPL
563341	2016 CU_{160}	—	December 5, 2005	Kitt Peak	Spacewatch	KOR	1.4 km	MPC · JPL
563342	2016 CA_{161}	—	July 7, 2014	Haleakala	Pan-STARRS 1	·	1.2 km	MPC · JPL
563343	2016 CW_{161}	—	February 8, 2002	Kitt Peak	Spacewatch	AST	1.3 km	MPC · JPL
563344	2016 CT_{162}	—	January 4, 2016	Haleakala	Pan-STARRS 1	·	1.8 km	MPC · JPL
563345	2016 CD_{163}	—	September 29, 2005	Kitt Peak	Spacewatch	·	1.7 km	MPC · JPL
563346	2016 CK_{163}	—	May 31, 2009	Kitt Peak	Spacewatch	·	1.4 km	MPC · JPL
563347	2016 CT_{164}	—	March 2, 2009	Kitt Peak	Spacewatch	·	970 m	MPC · JPL
563348	2016 CA_{165}	—	October 17, 2012	Haleakala	Pan-STARRS 1	L5	7.3 km	MPC · JPL
563349	2016 CX_{165}	—	August 18, 2014	Haleakala	Pan-STARRS 1	(5)	1.1 km	MPC · JPL
563350	2016 CC_{166}	—	August 21, 2006	Kitt Peak	Spacewatch	·	920 m	MPC · JPL
563351	2016 CD_{166}	—	January 2, 2011	Mount Lemmon	Mount Lemmon Survey	·	1.7 km	MPC · JPL
563352	2016 CT_{166}	—	March 6, 1999	Kitt Peak	Spacewatch	MIS	2.0 km	MPC · JPL
563353	2016 CW_{166}	—	December 2, 2010	Mount Lemmon	Mount Lemmon Survey	·	1.6 km	MPC · JPL
563354	2016 CA_{167}	—	January 28, 2007	Mount Lemmon	Mount Lemmon Survey	·	1.6 km	MPC · JPL
563355	2016 CV_{167}	—	April 21, 2013	Haleakala	Pan-STARRS 1	·	1.3 km	MPC · JPL
563356	2016 CA_{168}	—	August 28, 2014	Haleakala	Pan-STARRS 1	·	870 m	MPC · JPL
563357	2016 CH_{168}	—	August 18, 2009	Kitt Peak	Spacewatch	HOF	3.1 km	MPC · JPL
563358	2016 CL_{168}	—	September 16, 2010	Mount Lemmon	Mount Lemmon Survey	·	1.6 km	MPC · JPL
563359	2016 CO_{169}	—	January 7, 2016	Haleakala	Pan-STARRS 1	·	1.9 km	MPC · JPL
563360	2016 CA_{170}	—	August 29, 2005	Kitt Peak	Spacewatch	·	1.5 km	MPC · JPL
563361	2016 CB_{171}	—	January 19, 2012	Haleakala	Pan-STARRS 1	·	1.2 km	MPC · JPL
563362	2016 CK_{171}	—	October 28, 2014	Haleakala	Pan-STARRS 1	·	1.7 km	MPC · JPL
563363	2016 CX_{171}	—	January 28, 2007	Mount Lemmon	Mount Lemmon Survey	·	2.0 km	MPC · JPL
563364	2016 CH_{172}	—	February 27, 2012	Kitt Peak	Spacewatch	·	1.4 km	MPC · JPL
563365	2016 CT_{174}	—	April 6, 2008	Kitt Peak	Spacewatch	·	1.9 km	MPC · JPL
563366	2016 CU_{174}	—	July 27, 2009	Kitt Peak	Spacewatch	WIT	940 m	MPC · JPL
563367	2016 CH_{175}	—	August 30, 2014	Mount Lemmon	Mount Lemmon Survey	EUN	1.1 km	MPC · JPL
563368	2016 CB_{180}	—	January 18, 2008	Mount Lemmon	Mount Lemmon Survey	·	980 m	MPC · JPL
563369	2016 CY_{180}	—	January 25, 2003	Palomar	NEAT	·	1.9 km	MPC · JPL
563370	2016 CA_{183}	—	April 6, 2008	Kitt Peak	Spacewatch	·	1.7 km	MPC · JPL
563371	2016 CR_{183}	—	February 23, 2012	Catalina	CSS	·	1.6 km	MPC · JPL
563372	2016 CY_{183}	—	October 2, 2014	Catalina	CSS	·	1.7 km	MPC · JPL
563373	2016 CX_{185}	—	July 1, 2005	Palomar	NEAT	EUN	1.4 km	MPC · JPL
563374	2016 CW_{186}	—	November 25, 2010	Mount Lemmon	Mount Lemmon Survey	·	1.6 km	MPC · JPL
563375	2016 CZ_{186}	—	September 22, 2006	Catalina	CSS	·	1.3 km	MPC · JPL
563376	2016 CC_{189}	—	November 20, 2014	Haleakala	Pan-STARRS 1	·	1.4 km	MPC · JPL
563377	2016 CL_{189}	—	October 24, 2009	Kitt Peak	Spacewatch	·	1.7 km	MPC · JPL
563378	2016 CY_{189}	—	March 28, 2012	Mount Lemmon	Mount Lemmon Survey	·	1.3 km	MPC · JPL
563379	2016 CJ_{190}	—	November 30, 2005	Kitt Peak	Spacewatch	KOR	1.4 km	MPC · JPL
563380	2016 CV_{190}	—	November 30, 2010	Mount Lemmon	Mount Lemmon Survey	·	1.3 km	MPC · JPL
563381	2016 CC_{191}	—	January 4, 2016	Haleakala	Pan-STARRS 1	·	1.6 km	MPC · JPL
563382	2016 CF_{192}	—	February 23, 2012	Mount Lemmon	Mount Lemmon Survey	·	1.4 km	MPC · JPL
563383	2016 CH_{195}	—	January 25, 2003	Palomar	NEAT	H	570 m	MPC · JPL
563384	2016 CU_{195}	—	May 9, 2006	Mount Lemmon	Mount Lemmon Survey	H	470 m	MPC · JPL
563385	2016 CH_{196}	—	December 2, 2005	Kitt Peak	Spacewatch	·	1.7 km	MPC · JPL
563386	2016 CL_{196}	—	July 14, 2013	Haleakala	Pan-STARRS 1	·	1.3 km	MPC · JPL
563387	2016 CB_{198}	—	December 6, 2010	Mount Lemmon	Mount Lemmon Survey	·	1.7 km	MPC · JPL
563388	2016 CF_{198}	—	October 27, 2005	Mount Lemmon	Mount Lemmon Survey	·	1.3 km	MPC · JPL
563389	2016 CX_{198}	—	February 27, 2012	Haleakala	Pan-STARRS 1	·	1.4 km	MPC · JPL
563390	2016 CY_{198}	—	September 22, 2009	Kitt Peak	Spacewatch	·	1.7 km	MPC · JPL
563391	2016 CA_{200}	—	January 20, 2006	Kitt Peak	Spacewatch	·	1.7 km	MPC · JPL
563392	2016 CJ_{200}	—	January 4, 2011	Mount Lemmon	Mount Lemmon Survey	·	1.7 km	MPC · JPL
563393	2016 CK_{201}	—	December 10, 2010	Mount Lemmon	Mount Lemmon Survey	·	1.6 km	MPC · JPL
563394	2016 CS_{201}	—	February 27, 2012	Haleakala	Pan-STARRS 1	·	1.6 km	MPC · JPL
563395	2016 CA_{202}	—	March 15, 2007	Kitt Peak	Spacewatch	·	1.7 km	MPC · JPL
563396	2016 CN_{202}	—	January 25, 2007	Kitt Peak	Spacewatch	·	1.6 km	MPC · JPL
563397	2016 CH_{203}	—	November 29, 2005	Mount Lemmon	Mount Lemmon Survey	·	1.4 km	MPC · JPL
563398	2016 CT_{203}	—	April 27, 2012	Haleakala	Pan-STARRS 1	AGN	1.0 km	MPC · JPL
563399	2016 CY_{204}	—	January 9, 2002	Apache Point	SDSS Collaboration	·	1.7 km	MPC · JPL
563400	2016 CT_{205}	—	January 29, 2007	Kitt Peak	Spacewatch	·	1.7 km	MPC · JPL

== 563401–563500 ==
back to top

Designation			Discovery			Properties		Ref
Permanent	Provisional	Named after	Date	Site	Discoverer(s)	Category	Diam.	Ref
563401	2016 CA_{206}	—	March 10, 2007	Mount Lemmon	Mount Lemmon Survey	WIT	810 m	MPC · JPL
563402	2016 CM_{206}	—	October 21, 2014	Mount Lemmon	Mount Lemmon Survey	·	1.6 km	MPC · JPL
563403	2016 CS_{206}	—	September 29, 2005	Kitt Peak	Spacewatch	·	1.6 km	MPC · JPL
563404	2016 CA_{209}	—	December 26, 2006	Kitt Peak	Spacewatch	·	1.2 km	MPC · JPL
563405	2016 CL_{209}	—	November 22, 2006	Kitt Peak	Spacewatch	·	1.1 km	MPC · JPL
563406	2016 CA_{211}	—	September 16, 2009	Kitt Peak	Spacewatch	·	1.6 km	MPC · JPL
563407	2016 CX_{211}	—	January 28, 2007	Kitt Peak	Spacewatch	·	1.2 km	MPC · JPL
563408	2016 CZ_{211}	—	April 9, 2008	Kitt Peak	Spacewatch	·	1.1 km	MPC · JPL
563409	2016 CB_{212}	—	March 12, 2008	Mount Lemmon	Mount Lemmon Survey	·	830 m	MPC · JPL
563410	2016 CK_{212}	—	January 14, 2011	Kitt Peak	Spacewatch	·	1.7 km	MPC · JPL
563411	2016 CL_{212}	—	February 8, 2007	Kitt Peak	Spacewatch	·	1.6 km	MPC · JPL
563412	2016 CB_{213}	—	March 24, 2012	Mount Lemmon	Mount Lemmon Survey	·	1.3 km	MPC · JPL
563413	2016 CT_{213}	—	January 31, 2006	Kitt Peak	Spacewatch	KOR	1.4 km	MPC · JPL
563414	2016 CG_{214}	—	January 26, 2012	Haleakala	Pan-STARRS 1	NYS	910 m	MPC · JPL
563415	2016 CH_{214}	—	August 8, 2013	La Sagra	OAM	JUN	1.2 km	MPC · JPL
563416	2016 CB_{215}	—	September 21, 2009	Mount Lemmon	Mount Lemmon Survey	AGN	1.0 km	MPC · JPL
563417	2016 CZ_{215}	—	January 30, 2011	Kitt Peak	Spacewatch	·	2.3 km	MPC · JPL
563418	2016 CF_{218}	—	December 27, 2011	Mount Lemmon	Mount Lemmon Survey	·	950 m	MPC · JPL
563419	2016 CM_{218}	—	July 14, 2013	Haleakala	Pan-STARRS 1	AST	1.4 km	MPC · JPL
563420	2016 CV_{219}	—	February 7, 2011	Mount Lemmon	Mount Lemmon Survey	KOR	1.1 km	MPC · JPL
563421	2016 CX_{219}	—	September 1, 2014	Kitt Peak	Spacewatch	·	1.5 km	MPC · JPL
563422	2016 CY_{219}	—	February 25, 2007	Mount Lemmon	Mount Lemmon Survey	·	1.6 km	MPC · JPL
563423	2016 CQ_{220}	—	January 9, 2011	Mount Lemmon	Mount Lemmon Survey	HOF	2.2 km	MPC · JPL
563424	2016 CV_{220}	—	February 10, 2011	Mount Lemmon	Mount Lemmon Survey	·	1.7 km	MPC · JPL
563425	2016 CC_{221}	—	October 2, 2014	Haleakala	Pan-STARRS 1	·	1.4 km	MPC · JPL
563426	2016 CG_{222}	—	March 14, 2012	Mount Lemmon	Mount Lemmon Survey	·	1.4 km	MPC · JPL
563427	2016 CD_{223}	—	December 10, 2002	Palomar	NEAT	·	1.1 km	MPC · JPL
563428	2016 CG_{223}	—	January 31, 2008	Mount Lemmon	Mount Lemmon Survey	·	680 m	MPC · JPL
563429	2016 CL_{225}	—	October 7, 2004	Kitt Peak	Spacewatch	·	1.8 km	MPC · JPL
563430	2016 CW_{225}	—	August 19, 2014	Haleakala	Pan-STARRS 1	·	1.3 km	MPC · JPL
563431	2016 CR_{226}	—	April 20, 2012	Mount Lemmon	Mount Lemmon Survey	·	1.9 km	MPC · JPL
563432	2016 CU_{226}	—	April 6, 2008	Kitt Peak	Spacewatch	·	1.5 km	MPC · JPL
563433	2016 CB_{228}	—	August 23, 2014	Haleakala	Pan-STARRS 1	·	1.6 km	MPC · JPL
563434	2016 CF_{228}	—	March 15, 2007	Catalina	CSS	·	1.9 km	MPC · JPL
563435	2016 CA_{229}	—	October 25, 2001	Apache Point	SDSS Collaboration	ADE	1.8 km	MPC · JPL
563436	2016 CZ_{229}	—	August 22, 2014	Haleakala	Pan-STARRS 1	·	1.9 km	MPC · JPL
563437	2016 CB_{230}	—	October 2, 2014	Haleakala	Pan-STARRS 1	·	1.5 km	MPC · JPL
563438	2016 CO_{230}	—	January 3, 2016	Haleakala	Pan-STARRS 1	HNS	1.5 km	MPC · JPL
563439	2016 CA_{232}	—	October 26, 2014	Mount Lemmon	Mount Lemmon Survey	·	1.3 km	MPC · JPL
563440	2016 CV_{232}	—	January 28, 2011	Catalina	CSS	·	2.6 km	MPC · JPL
563441	2016 CL_{236}	—	November 8, 2009	Mount Lemmon	Mount Lemmon Survey	TRE	2.0 km	MPC · JPL
563442	2016 CJ_{238}	—	December 13, 2006	Kitt Peak	Spacewatch	EUN	1.2 km	MPC · JPL
563443	2016 CR_{238}	—	August 26, 2014	Haleakala	Pan-STARRS 1	EUN	930 m	MPC · JPL
563444	2016 CX_{239}	—	November 7, 2010	Mount Lemmon	Mount Lemmon Survey	·	2.0 km	MPC · JPL
563445	2016 CL_{241}	—	March 15, 2012	Mount Lemmon	Mount Lemmon Survey	·	2.1 km	MPC · JPL
563446	2016 CJ_{242}	—	April 14, 2008	Mount Lemmon	Mount Lemmon Survey	·	1.7 km	MPC · JPL
563447	2016 CP_{242}	—	October 14, 2014	Catalina	CSS	MAR	990 m	MPC · JPL
563448	2016 CS_{242}	—	September 28, 2014	Haleakala	Pan-STARRS 1	·	1.6 km	MPC · JPL
563449	2016 CH_{244}	—	January 5, 2011	Catalina	CSS	·	1.9 km	MPC · JPL
563450	2016 CM_{245}	—	January 5, 2011	Mount Lemmon	Mount Lemmon Survey	(18466)	1.7 km	MPC · JPL
563451	2016 CX_{245}	—	December 30, 2005	Kitt Peak	Spacewatch	·	2.0 km	MPC · JPL
563452	2016 CR_{248}	—	September 25, 2006	Kitt Peak	Spacewatch	·	830 m	MPC · JPL
563453	2016 CU_{248}	—	December 21, 2006	Mount Lemmon	Mount Lemmon Survey	·	1.8 km	MPC · JPL
563454	2016 CV_{249}	—	February 16, 2012	Haleakala	Pan-STARRS 1	·	1.2 km	MPC · JPL
563455	2016 CT_{250}	—	August 31, 2005	Palomar	NEAT	·	2.0 km	MPC · JPL
563456	2016 CF_{251}	—	April 9, 2008	Mount Lemmon	Mount Lemmon Survey	·	1.1 km	MPC · JPL
563457	2016 CM_{251}	—	November 5, 2010	Kitt Peak	Spacewatch	·	2.2 km	MPC · JPL
563458	2016 CW_{252}	—	July 20, 2001	Anderson Mesa	LONEOS	·	1.4 km	MPC · JPL
563459	2016 CY_{252}	—	June 8, 2013	Siding Spring	SSS	TIN	1.3 km	MPC · JPL
563460	2016 CF_{253}	—	August 17, 2009	Kitt Peak	Spacewatch	·	2.2 km	MPC · JPL
563461	2016 CG_{253}	—	October 25, 2001	Apache Point	SDSS Collaboration	·	1.2 km	MPC · JPL
563462	2016 CQ_{253}	—	November 2, 2010	Kitt Peak	Spacewatch	·	1.4 km	MPC · JPL
563463	2016 CH_{255}	—	March 16, 2012	Haleakala	Pan-STARRS 1	·	1.3 km	MPC · JPL
563464	2016 CA_{256}	—	November 20, 2006	Kitt Peak	Spacewatch	EUN	1.1 km	MPC · JPL
563465	2016 CT_{256}	—	October 27, 2005	Mount Lemmon	Mount Lemmon Survey	AGN	980 m	MPC · JPL
563466	2016 CJ_{258}	—	March 21, 2001	Kitt Peak	Spacewatch	·	1.9 km	MPC · JPL
563467	2016 CL_{258}	—	August 5, 2014	Haleakala	Pan-STARRS 1	EUN	1.0 km	MPC · JPL
563468	2016 CW_{258}	—	April 5, 2010	Bergisch Gladbach	W. Bickel	·	3.5 km	MPC · JPL
563469	2016 CT_{259}	—	October 8, 2004	Kitt Peak	Spacewatch	·	2.2 km	MPC · JPL
563470	2016 CG_{260}	—	March 17, 2005	Mount Lemmon	Mount Lemmon Survey	·	2.7 km	MPC · JPL
563471	2016 CP_{260}	—	January 15, 2015	Mount Lemmon	Mount Lemmon Survey	·	2.3 km	MPC · JPL
563472	2016 CK_{262}	—	August 25, 2004	Kitt Peak	Spacewatch	·	1.7 km	MPC · JPL
563473	2016 CM_{262}	—	December 27, 2011	Mount Lemmon	Mount Lemmon Survey	EUN	1.2 km	MPC · JPL
563474	2016 CM_{266}	—	September 21, 1996	Kitt Peak	Spacewatch	H	440 m	MPC · JPL
563475	2016 CR_{266}	—	March 6, 2011	Bergisch Gladbach	W. Bickel	H	290 m	MPC · JPL
563476	2016 CR_{267}	—	February 14, 2016	Haleakala	Pan-STARRS 1	H	410 m	MPC · JPL
563477	2016 CO_{268}	—	September 17, 2014	Haleakala	Pan-STARRS 1	H	570 m	MPC · JPL
563478	2016 CQ_{270}	—	February 5, 2016	Haleakala	Pan-STARRS 1	EUN	830 m	MPC · JPL
563479	2016 CH_{272}	—	January 20, 2002	Kitt Peak	Spacewatch	DOR	1.9 km	MPC · JPL
563480	2016 CW_{272}	—	June 2, 2008	Mount Lemmon	Mount Lemmon Survey	·	1.5 km	MPC · JPL
563481	2016 CF_{273}	—	March 13, 2007	Mount Lemmon	Mount Lemmon Survey	·	1.6 km	MPC · JPL
563482	2016 CO_{273}	—	February 9, 2016	Haleakala	Pan-STARRS 1	·	3.1 km	MPC · JPL
563483	2016 CU_{273}	—	February 10, 2007	Mount Lemmon	Mount Lemmon Survey	·	1.4 km	MPC · JPL
563484	2016 CE_{274}	—	February 9, 2016	Haleakala	Pan-STARRS 1	·	1.5 km	MPC · JPL
563485	2016 CW_{277}	—	July 25, 2003	Palomar	NEAT	·	2.4 km	MPC · JPL
563486	2016 CC_{278}	—	November 18, 2009	Mount Lemmon	Mount Lemmon Survey	·	1.7 km	MPC · JPL
563487	2016 CS_{278}	—	May 24, 2006	Kitt Peak	Spacewatch	·	2.5 km	MPC · JPL
563488	2016 CM_{279}	—	November 1, 2005	Mount Lemmon	Mount Lemmon Survey	·	1.5 km	MPC · JPL
563489	2016 CQ_{279}	—	January 12, 2011	Mount Lemmon	Mount Lemmon Survey	·	1.5 km	MPC · JPL
563490	2016 CX_{279}	—	November 21, 2014	Haleakala	Pan-STARRS 1	·	950 m	MPC · JPL
563491	2016 CL_{280}	—	May 23, 2006	Mount Lemmon	Mount Lemmon Survey	·	2.1 km	MPC · JPL
563492	2016 CT_{280}	—	May 1, 2011	Haleakala	Pan-STARRS 1	EOS	1.5 km	MPC · JPL
563493	2016 CU_{280}	—	September 15, 2009	Kitt Peak	Spacewatch	·	2.3 km	MPC · JPL
563494	2016 CW_{280}	—	December 27, 2006	Mount Lemmon	Mount Lemmon Survey	·	1.1 km	MPC · JPL
563495	2016 CX_{280}	—	July 12, 2013	Haleakala	Pan-STARRS 1	·	2.1 km	MPC · JPL
563496	2016 CY_{280}	—	September 28, 1997	Kitt Peak	Spacewatch	EOS	2.0 km	MPC · JPL
563497	2016 CD_{281}	—	October 1, 2014	Haleakala	Pan-STARRS 1	·	1.5 km	MPC · JPL
563498	2016 CL_{281}	—	September 27, 2009	Kitt Peak	Spacewatch	HOF	2.0 km	MPC · JPL
563499	2016 CN_{281}	—	March 14, 2007	Mount Lemmon	Mount Lemmon Survey	·	1.4 km	MPC · JPL
563500	2016 CX_{281}	—	February 13, 2007	Mount Lemmon	Mount Lemmon Survey	·	1.4 km	MPC · JPL

== 563501–563600 ==
back to top

Designation			Discovery			Properties		Ref
Permanent	Provisional	Named after	Date	Site	Discoverer(s)	Category	Diam.	Ref
563501	2016 CY_{281}	—	August 27, 2009	Kitt Peak	Spacewatch	·	1.7 km	MPC · JPL
563502	2016 CE_{282}	—	November 18, 2006	Mount Lemmon	Mount Lemmon Survey	·	1.2 km	MPC · JPL
563503	2016 CR_{282}	—	September 21, 2009	Mount Lemmon	Mount Lemmon Survey	HOF	2.2 km	MPC · JPL
563504	2016 CW_{282}	—	December 30, 2005	7300	W. K. Y. Yeung	·	2.4 km	MPC · JPL
563505	2016 CX_{282}	—	March 25, 2007	Mount Lemmon	Mount Lemmon Survey	·	2.3 km	MPC · JPL
563506	2016 CF_{284}	—	November 2, 2007	Mount Lemmon	Mount Lemmon Survey	·	3.2 km	MPC · JPL
563507	2016 CR_{284}	—	October 29, 2010	Mount Lemmon	Mount Lemmon Survey	·	950 m	MPC · JPL
563508	2016 CA_{285}	—	November 23, 2014	Haleakala	Pan-STARRS 1	·	1.2 km	MPC · JPL
563509	2016 CP_{285}	—	October 28, 2014	Haleakala	Pan-STARRS 1	·	1.1 km	MPC · JPL
563510	2016 CX_{285}	—	September 19, 2014	Haleakala	Pan-STARRS 1	(5)	850 m	MPC · JPL
563511	2016 CZ_{285}	—	July 28, 2005	Palomar	NEAT	·	920 m	MPC · JPL
563512	2016 CC_{286}	—	February 11, 2016	Haleakala	Pan-STARRS 1	·	2.0 km	MPC · JPL
563513	2016 CF_{286}	—	November 22, 2009	Kitt Peak	Spacewatch	·	3.2 km	MPC · JPL
563514	2016 CT_{287}	—	September 21, 2008	Kitt Peak	Spacewatch	EOS	1.6 km	MPC · JPL
563515	2016 CU_{287}	—	August 14, 2013	Haleakala	Pan-STARRS 1	·	1.5 km	MPC · JPL
563516	2016 CL_{288}	—	September 14, 2013	Haleakala	Pan-STARRS 1	EOS	1.7 km	MPC · JPL
563517	2016 CQ_{288}	—	December 21, 2014	Haleakala	Pan-STARRS 1	EOS	1.5 km	MPC · JPL
563518	2016 CU_{288}	—	December 26, 2014	Haleakala	Pan-STARRS 1	·	2.3 km	MPC · JPL
563519	2016 CG_{289}	—	December 10, 2014	Mount Lemmon	Mount Lemmon Survey	·	2.1 km	MPC · JPL
563520	2016 CM_{289}	—	August 15, 2013	Haleakala	Pan-STARRS 1	KOR	1.2 km	MPC · JPL
563521	2016 CN_{289}	—	February 10, 2007	Mount Lemmon	Mount Lemmon Survey	·	1.5 km	MPC · JPL
563522	2016 CQ_{289}	—	February 5, 2016	Haleakala	Pan-STARRS 1	·	2.8 km	MPC · JPL
563523	2016 CR_{289}	—	February 5, 2016	Haleakala	Pan-STARRS 1	·	2.4 km	MPC · JPL
563524	2016 CZ_{289}	—	February 9, 2016	Haleakala	Pan-STARRS 1	·	1.2 km	MPC · JPL
563525	2016 CC_{290}	—	October 14, 2009	Mount Lemmon	Mount Lemmon Survey	HOF	2.1 km	MPC · JPL
563526	2016 CE_{291}	—	March 6, 2011	Wildberg	R. Apitzsch	·	1.6 km	MPC · JPL
563527	2016 CL_{291}	—	November 11, 2009	Kitt Peak	Spacewatch	·	1.6 km	MPC · JPL
563528	2016 CM_{291}	—	March 2, 2011	Mount Lemmon	Mount Lemmon Survey	AGN	990 m	MPC · JPL
563529	2016 CN_{291}	—	February 5, 2016	Haleakala	Pan-STARRS 1	·	2.0 km	MPC · JPL
563530	2016 CU_{291}	—	December 10, 2014	Mount Lemmon	Mount Lemmon Survey	·	1.7 km	MPC · JPL
563531	2016 CV_{291}	—	October 14, 2009	Catalina	CSS	·	2.2 km	MPC · JPL
563532	2016 CZ_{291}	—	April 24, 2012	Mount Lemmon	Mount Lemmon Survey	·	1.4 km	MPC · JPL
563533	2016 CB_{292}	—	February 10, 2011	Mount Lemmon	Mount Lemmon Survey	·	1.2 km	MPC · JPL
563534	2016 CJ_{292}	—	March 10, 2011	Mount Lemmon	Mount Lemmon Survey	GEF	1.1 km	MPC · JPL
563535	2016 CN_{292}	—	March 8, 2005	Kitt Peak	Spacewatch	·	2.3 km	MPC · JPL
563536	2016 CP_{292}	—	August 27, 2013	Haleakala	Pan-STARRS 1	·	2.2 km	MPC · JPL
563537	2016 CT_{292}	—	March 26, 2003	Kitt Peak	Spacewatch	·	2.5 km	MPC · JPL
563538	2016 CY_{292}	—	September 29, 2008	Mount Lemmon	Mount Lemmon Survey	·	2.7 km	MPC · JPL
563539	2016 CG_{293}	—	September 29, 2003	Kitt Peak	Spacewatch	KOR	1.3 km	MPC · JPL
563540	2016 CQ_{293}	—	October 9, 2005	Kitt Peak	Spacewatch	·	1.2 km	MPC · JPL
563541	2016 CV_{293}	—	January 23, 2011	Mount Lemmon	Mount Lemmon Survey	MRX	880 m	MPC · JPL
563542	2016 CB_{294}	—	April 16, 2012	Haleakala	Pan-STARRS 1	·	1.4 km	MPC · JPL
563543	2016 CG_{294}	—	August 13, 2013	Kitt Peak	Spacewatch	·	1.8 km	MPC · JPL
563544	2016 CH_{294}	—	August 25, 2003	Cerro Tololo	Deep Ecliptic Survey	·	1.9 km	MPC · JPL
563545	2016 CJ_{294}	—	March 13, 2005	Mount Lemmon	Mount Lemmon Survey	·	2.6 km	MPC · JPL
563546	2016 CD_{295}	—	October 1, 2014	Haleakala	Pan-STARRS 1	·	1.6 km	MPC · JPL
563547	2016 CK_{295}	—	October 1, 2014	Haleakala	Pan-STARRS 1	·	1.2 km	MPC · JPL
563548	2016 CB_{296}	—	October 28, 2014	Haleakala	Pan-STARRS 1	·	1.5 km	MPC · JPL
563549	2016 CL_{296}	—	August 22, 2014	Haleakala	Pan-STARRS 1	·	960 m	MPC · JPL
563550	2016 CW_{296}	—	January 30, 2011	Mount Lemmon	Mount Lemmon Survey	·	2.1 km	MPC · JPL
563551	2016 CZ_{297}	—	January 14, 2011	Mount Lemmon	Mount Lemmon Survey	AGN	840 m	MPC · JPL
563552	2016 CO_{298}	—	October 25, 2014	Mount Lemmon	Mount Lemmon Survey	·	2.1 km	MPC · JPL
563553	2016 CP_{298}	—	January 13, 2011	Mount Lemmon	Mount Lemmon Survey	·	1.5 km	MPC · JPL
563554	2016 CX_{298}	—	April 1, 2012	Mount Lemmon	Mount Lemmon Survey	·	1.9 km	MPC · JPL
563555	2016 CR_{299}	—	October 28, 2014	Haleakala	Pan-STARRS 1	·	2.4 km	MPC · JPL
563556	2016 CF_{301}	—	July 16, 2013	Haleakala	Pan-STARRS 1	·	1.2 km	MPC · JPL
563557	2016 CP_{301}	—	January 30, 2011	Haleakala	Pan-STARRS 1	·	1.5 km	MPC · JPL
563558	2016 CT_{301}	—	September 7, 2004	Kitt Peak	Spacewatch	AST	1.5 km	MPC · JPL
563559	2016 CV_{301}	—	May 13, 2012	Mount Lemmon	Mount Lemmon Survey	MRX	890 m	MPC · JPL
563560	2016 CV_{302}	—	February 7, 2011	Mount Lemmon	Mount Lemmon Survey	HOF	2.4 km	MPC · JPL
563561	2016 CC_{304}	—	September 1, 2013	Haleakala	Pan-STARRS 1	·	2.2 km	MPC · JPL
563562	2016 CM_{304}	—	February 11, 2004	Kitt Peak	Spacewatch	·	2.9 km	MPC · JPL
563563	2016 CS_{304}	—	December 25, 2005	Mount Lemmon	Mount Lemmon Survey	·	1.5 km	MPC · JPL
563564	2016 CC_{306}	—	March 6, 2011	Mount Lemmon	Mount Lemmon Survey	·	2.0 km	MPC · JPL
563565	2016 CW_{306}	—	February 9, 2011	Bergisch Gladbach	W. Bickel	·	1.8 km	MPC · JPL
563566	2016 CP_{307}	—	October 25, 2005	Kitt Peak	Spacewatch	·	1.4 km	MPC · JPL
563567	2016 CR_{307}	—	October 7, 2004	Kitt Peak	Spacewatch	·	1.8 km	MPC · JPL
563568	2016 CG_{308}	—	August 9, 2013	Haleakala	Pan-STARRS 1	·	1.9 km	MPC · JPL
563569	2016 CJ_{308}	—	April 15, 2012	Haleakala	Pan-STARRS 1	·	1.1 km	MPC · JPL
563570	2016 CG_{309}	—	November 26, 2014	Haleakala	Pan-STARRS 1	EOS	1.6 km	MPC · JPL
563571	2016 CJ_{309}	—	February 13, 2011	Mount Lemmon	Mount Lemmon Survey	·	1.6 km	MPC · JPL
563572	2016 CF_{310}	—	August 28, 2000	Cerro Tololo	Deep Ecliptic Survey	·	2.2 km	MPC · JPL
563573	2016 CC_{311}	—	January 26, 2011	Mount Lemmon	Mount Lemmon Survey	·	2.1 km	MPC · JPL
563574	2016 CQ_{311}	—	February 10, 2016	Haleakala	Pan-STARRS 1	·	1.2 km	MPC · JPL
563575	2016 CE_{312}	—	August 15, 2013	Haleakala	Pan-STARRS 1	·	1.5 km	MPC · JPL
563576	2016 CY_{312}	—	March 11, 2011	Kitt Peak	Spacewatch	·	1.2 km	MPC · JPL
563577	2016 CN_{313}	—	November 17, 2009	Mount Lemmon	Mount Lemmon Survey	KOR	1.2 km	MPC · JPL
563578	2016 CG_{314}	—	January 19, 2015	Haleakala	Pan-STARRS 1	·	1.8 km	MPC · JPL
563579	2016 CW_{314}	—	October 29, 2008	Mount Lemmon	Mount Lemmon Survey	·	2.5 km	MPC · JPL
563580	2016 CD_{315}	—	November 26, 2013	Nogales	M. Schwartz, P. R. Holvorcem	·	2.2 km	MPC · JPL
563581	2016 CR_{315}	—	January 27, 2007	Kitt Peak	Spacewatch	·	1.5 km	MPC · JPL
563582	2016 CZ_{315}	—	October 28, 2014	Haleakala	Pan-STARRS 1	·	1.4 km	MPC · JPL
563583	2016 CA_{316}	—	February 11, 2016	Haleakala	Pan-STARRS 1	·	1.9 km	MPC · JPL
563584	2016 CG_{316}	—	March 28, 2012	Kitt Peak	Spacewatch	·	1.4 km	MPC · JPL
563585	2016 CV_{316}	—	February 25, 2007	Kitt Peak	Spacewatch	·	1.4 km	MPC · JPL
563586	2016 CD_{317}	—	August 9, 2013	Haleakala	Pan-STARRS 1	·	1.3 km	MPC · JPL
563587	2016 CF_{318}	—	February 20, 2012	Haleakala	Pan-STARRS 1	·	1.3 km	MPC · JPL
563588	2016 CK_{318}	—	February 8, 2010	Kitt Peak	Spacewatch	EOS	1.8 km	MPC · JPL
563589	2016 CN_{318}	—	January 22, 2015	Haleakala	Pan-STARRS 1	·	2.4 km	MPC · JPL
563590	2016 CR_{318}	—	February 11, 2016	Haleakala	Pan-STARRS 1	TIR	2.5 km	MPC · JPL
563591	2016 CH_{319}	—	November 18, 2014	Mount Lemmon	Mount Lemmon Survey	·	2.7 km	MPC · JPL
563592	2016 CJ_{319}	—	May 21, 2011	Mount Lemmon	Mount Lemmon Survey	·	2.2 km	MPC · JPL
563593	2016 CT_{319}	—	September 18, 2001	Apache Point	SDSS	·	3.5 km	MPC · JPL
563594	2016 CM_{320}	—	October 15, 2013	Oukaïmeden	M. Ory	·	1.9 km	MPC · JPL
563595	2016 CX_{320}	—	October 5, 2013	Haleakala	Pan-STARRS 1	·	2.4 km	MPC · JPL
563596	2016 CD_{321}	—	February 27, 2012	Haleakala	Pan-STARRS 1	·	1.7 km	MPC · JPL
563597	2016 CE_{321}	—	January 13, 2011	Kitt Peak	Spacewatch	·	1.7 km	MPC · JPL
563598	2016 CG_{321}	—	November 28, 2014	Mount Lemmon	Mount Lemmon Survey	·	1.6 km	MPC · JPL
563599	2016 CM_{321}	—	August 25, 2012	Kitt Peak	Spacewatch	·	2.9 km	MPC · JPL
563600	2016 CA_{322}	—	November 17, 2014	Haleakala	Pan-STARRS 1	TIR	2.6 km	MPC · JPL

== 563601–563700 ==
back to top

Designation			Discovery			Properties		Ref
Permanent	Provisional	Named after	Date	Site	Discoverer(s)	Category	Diam.	Ref
563601	2016 CE_{322}	—	November 14, 2010	Mount Lemmon	Mount Lemmon Survey	·	1.4 km	MPC · JPL
563602	2016 CH_{322}	—	February 14, 2016	Haleakala	Pan-STARRS 1	·	2.9 km	MPC · JPL
563603	2016 CM_{322}	—	December 24, 2014	Mount Lemmon	Mount Lemmon Survey	·	2.7 km	MPC · JPL
563604	2016 CR_{322}	—	November 26, 2014	Haleakala	Pan-STARRS 1	·	2.4 km	MPC · JPL
563605	2016 CY_{322}	—	February 2, 2016	Haleakala	Pan-STARRS 1	·	1.5 km	MPC · JPL
563606	2016 CB_{323}	—	May 30, 2006	Mount Lemmon	Mount Lemmon Survey	·	2.1 km	MPC · JPL
563607	2016 CS_{330}	—	February 11, 2016	Haleakala	Pan-STARRS 1	LIX	2.9 km	MPC · JPL
563608	2016 CZ_{330}	—	January 20, 2015	Haleakala	Pan-STARRS 1	·	2.7 km	MPC · JPL
563609	2016 CB_{333}	—	October 1, 2014	Kitt Peak	Spacewatch	MAR	630 m	MPC · JPL
563610	2016 CB_{346}	—	March 3, 2011	Mount Lemmon	Mount Lemmon Survey	·	1.4 km	MPC · JPL
563611	2016 CB_{348}	—	February 5, 2016	Haleakala	Pan-STARRS 1	·	2.7 km	MPC · JPL
563612	2016 CK_{357}	—	February 6, 2016	Haleakala	Pan-STARRS 1	·	750 m	MPC · JPL
563613	2016 CC_{363}	—	February 14, 2016	Haleakala	Pan-STARRS 1	·	2.5 km	MPC · JPL
563614	2016 DD_{2}	—	June 27, 2014	Haleakala	Pan-STARRS 1	H	540 m	MPC · JPL
563615	2016 DA_{3}	—	July 31, 2014	Haleakala	Pan-STARRS 1	·	1.8 km	MPC · JPL
563616	2016 DC_{3}	—	March 10, 1999	Kitt Peak	Spacewatch	·	1.6 km	MPC · JPL
563617	2016 DL_{3}	—	October 19, 2010	Mount Lemmon	Mount Lemmon Survey	·	1.2 km	MPC · JPL
563618	2016 DH_{5}	—	January 17, 2016	Haleakala	Pan-STARRS 1	·	1.6 km	MPC · JPL
563619	2016 DK_{5}	—	January 4, 2016	Haleakala	Pan-STARRS 1	·	1.1 km	MPC · JPL
563620	2016 DE_{6}	—	November 18, 2006	Kitt Peak	Spacewatch	·	1.2 km	MPC · JPL
563621	2016 DL_{6}	—	January 27, 2007	Mount Lemmon	Mount Lemmon Survey	ADE	2.5 km	MPC · JPL
563622	2016 DL_{8}	—	August 20, 2014	Haleakala	Pan-STARRS 1	·	1.2 km	MPC · JPL
563623	2016 DP_{8}	—	September 8, 1996	Kitt Peak	Spacewatch	·	1.4 km	MPC · JPL
563624	2016 DQ_{8}	—	March 10, 2007	Kitt Peak	Spacewatch	·	2.2 km	MPC · JPL
563625	2016 DA_{9}	—	August 12, 2013	Haleakala	Pan-STARRS 1	·	1.5 km	MPC · JPL
563626	2016 DD_{9}	—	April 15, 2012	Haleakala	Pan-STARRS 1	·	2.4 km	MPC · JPL
563627	2016 DG_{9}	—	August 16, 2009	Kitt Peak	Spacewatch	·	1.9 km	MPC · JPL
563628	2016 DS_{9}	—	March 26, 2007	Kitt Peak	Spacewatch	·	1.7 km	MPC · JPL
563629	2016 DF_{10}	—	August 20, 2009	Kitt Peak	Spacewatch	HOF	1.9 km	MPC · JPL
563630	2016 DN_{11}	—	January 10, 2007	Kitt Peak	Spacewatch	·	2.1 km	MPC · JPL
563631	2016 DY_{11}	—	February 22, 2007	Kitt Peak	Spacewatch	·	1.6 km	MPC · JPL
563632	2016 DY_{12}	—	January 26, 2011	Kitt Peak	Spacewatch	BRA	1.6 km	MPC · JPL
563633	2016 DE_{13}	—	October 28, 2014	Haleakala	Pan-STARRS 1	·	1.6 km	MPC · JPL
563634	2016 DW_{13}	—	February 6, 2002	Kitt Peak	Deep Ecliptic Survey	·	1.4 km	MPC · JPL
563635	2016 DY_{13}	—	October 1, 2014	Haleakala	Pan-STARRS 1	·	1.8 km	MPC · JPL
563636	2016 DG_{15}	—	October 9, 2008	Mount Lemmon	Mount Lemmon Survey	EOS	2.1 km	MPC · JPL
563637	2016 DM_{15}	—	February 27, 2016	Mount Lemmon	Mount Lemmon Survey	DOR	2.1 km	MPC · JPL
563638	2016 DQ_{15}	—	March 1, 2012	Mount Lemmon	Mount Lemmon Survey	EUN	1.1 km	MPC · JPL
563639	2016 DX_{15}	—	April 30, 2012	Kitt Peak	Spacewatch	GEF	980 m	MPC · JPL
563640	2016 DF_{16}	—	February 5, 2016	Haleakala	Pan-STARRS 1	·	750 m	MPC · JPL
563641	2016 DN_{16}	—	September 20, 2008	Mount Lemmon	Mount Lemmon Survey	·	2.0 km	MPC · JPL
563642	2016 DF_{17}	—	December 13, 2015	Haleakala	Pan-STARRS 1	GAL	1.2 km	MPC · JPL
563643	2016 DL_{17}	—	January 6, 2006	Catalina	CSS	·	2.4 km	MPC · JPL
563644	2016 DO_{17}	—	November 17, 2014	Haleakala	Pan-STARRS 1	·	1.7 km	MPC · JPL
563645	2016 DT_{18}	—	December 17, 2009	Mount Lemmon	Mount Lemmon Survey	·	2.0 km	MPC · JPL
563646	2016 DP_{19}	—	January 8, 2016	Haleakala	Pan-STARRS 1	·	1.6 km	MPC · JPL
563647	2016 DR_{20}	—	September 24, 2014	Haleakala	Pan-STARRS 1	·	2.6 km	MPC · JPL
563648	2016 DV_{20}	—	March 29, 2011	Mount Lemmon	Mount Lemmon Survey	·	1.6 km	MPC · JPL
563649	2016 DL_{21}	—	August 23, 2008	Siding Spring	SSS	·	2.7 km	MPC · JPL
563650	2016 DK_{22}	—	April 6, 2008	Kitt Peak	Spacewatch	·	1.4 km	MPC · JPL
563651	2016 DN_{23}	—	February 21, 2012	Mount Lemmon	Mount Lemmon Survey	·	1.4 km	MPC · JPL
563652	2016 DY_{23}	—	February 27, 2006	Mount Lemmon	Mount Lemmon Survey	·	3.4 km	MPC · JPL
563653	2016 DB_{24}	—	August 27, 2014	Haleakala	Pan-STARRS 1	·	1.4 km	MPC · JPL
563654	2016 DN_{24}	—	February 26, 2012	Kitt Peak	Spacewatch	(29841)	1.3 km	MPC · JPL
563655	2016 DQ_{24}	—	September 16, 2014	Haleakala	Pan-STARRS 1	·	1.7 km	MPC · JPL
563656	2016 DS_{25}	—	March 13, 2012	Mount Lemmon	Mount Lemmon Survey	·	1.5 km	MPC · JPL
563657	2016 DR_{26}	—	November 26, 2009	Mount Lemmon	Mount Lemmon Survey	·	2.9 km	MPC · JPL
563658	2016 DY_{26}	—	May 3, 2003	Kitt Peak	Spacewatch	·	1.4 km	MPC · JPL
563659	2016 DA_{27}	—	March 14, 2012	Mount Lemmon	Mount Lemmon Survey	·	1.9 km	MPC · JPL
563660	2016 DE_{28}	—	October 1, 2005	Kitt Peak	Spacewatch	·	1.5 km	MPC · JPL
563661	2016 DE_{29}	—	February 4, 2006	Mount Lemmon	Mount Lemmon Survey	·	1.9 km	MPC · JPL
563662	2016 DF_{29}	—	March 10, 2007	Mount Lemmon	Mount Lemmon Survey	·	1.5 km	MPC · JPL
563663	2016 DN_{29}	—	February 4, 2006	Kitt Peak	Spacewatch	KOR	1.3 km	MPC · JPL
563664	2016 DM_{30}	—	April 12, 2011	Mount Lemmon	Mount Lemmon Survey	·	1.9 km	MPC · JPL
563665	2016 DT_{30}	—	May 25, 2007	Mount Lemmon	Mount Lemmon Survey	·	2.2 km	MPC · JPL
563666	2016 DN_{31}	—	February 18, 2016	Mount Lemmon	Mount Lemmon Survey	H	480 m	MPC · JPL
563667	2016 DA_{32}	—	September 23, 2008	Kitt Peak	Spacewatch	EOS	1.8 km	MPC · JPL
563668	2016 DD_{32}	—	February 23, 2011	Kitt Peak	Spacewatch	·	2.1 km	MPC · JPL
563669	2016 DP_{32}	—	November 26, 2014	Haleakala	Pan-STARRS 1	·	2.9 km	MPC · JPL
563670	2016 DQ_{32}	—	February 12, 2011	Mount Lemmon	Mount Lemmon Survey	·	1.6 km	MPC · JPL
563671	2016 DW_{32}	—	April 18, 2007	Mount Lemmon	Mount Lemmon Survey	·	1.9 km	MPC · JPL
563672	2016 DE_{33}	—	April 15, 2012	Haleakala	Pan-STARRS 1	·	1.7 km	MPC · JPL
563673	2016 DP_{33}	—	May 1, 2012	Kitt Peak	Spacewatch	EUN	1.0 km	MPC · JPL
563674	2016 DO_{34}	—	January 27, 2007	Kitt Peak	Spacewatch	·	1.2 km	MPC · JPL
563675	2016 DY_{34}	—	March 27, 2011	Mount Lemmon	Mount Lemmon Survey	critical	1.4 km	MPC · JPL
563676	2016 DG_{35}	—	October 24, 2009	Catalina	CSS	·	2.1 km	MPC · JPL
563677	2016 DP_{37}	—	February 29, 2016	Haleakala	Pan-STARRS 1	HOF	2.4 km	MPC · JPL
563678	2016 EU	—	March 1, 2016	Haleakala	Pan-STARRS 1	H	440 m	MPC · JPL
563679	2016 ES_{3}	—	August 8, 2004	Anderson Mesa	LONEOS	·	2.4 km	MPC · JPL
563680	2016 EV_{3}	—	April 4, 2002	Palomar	NEAT	·	2.4 km	MPC · JPL
563681	2016 EH_{4}	—	November 21, 2014	Haleakala	Pan-STARRS 1	·	3.1 km	MPC · JPL
563682	2016 ER_{4}	—	January 14, 2010	Mount Lemmon	Mount Lemmon Survey	·	2.7 km	MPC · JPL
563683	2016 EQ_{5}	—	January 18, 2012	Kitt Peak	Spacewatch	HNS	980 m	MPC · JPL
563684	2016 EG_{6}	—	October 16, 2009	Mount Lemmon	Mount Lemmon Survey	·	1.6 km	MPC · JPL
563685	2016 ED_{7}	—	March 27, 2012	Mount Lemmon	Mount Lemmon Survey	·	1.9 km	MPC · JPL
563686	2016 EM_{7}	—	July 8, 2003	Kitt Peak	Spacewatch	·	1.9 km	MPC · JPL
563687	2016 EB_{8}	—	October 11, 2004	Kitt Peak	Deep Ecliptic Survey	·	2.0 km	MPC · JPL
563688	2016 EE_{8}	—	November 22, 2006	Mount Lemmon	Mount Lemmon Survey	·	1.1 km	MPC · JPL
563689	2016 EJ_{8}	—	October 2, 2014	Haleakala	Pan-STARRS 1	·	1.6 km	MPC · JPL
563690	2016 EV_{9}	—	February 17, 2010	Catalina	CSS	·	3.3 km	MPC · JPL
563691	2016 EO_{10}	—	November 19, 2003	Palomar	NEAT	·	2.7 km	MPC · JPL
563692	2016 EP_{10}	—	March 26, 2011	Mount Lemmon	Mount Lemmon Survey	EOS	2.0 km	MPC · JPL
563693	2016 EQ_{10}	—	November 23, 2009	Mount Lemmon	Mount Lemmon Survey	·	1.9 km	MPC · JPL
563694	2016 EU_{10}	—	October 30, 2014	Haleakala	Pan-STARRS 1	·	1.6 km	MPC · JPL
563695	2016 EJ_{13}	—	April 20, 2012	Haleakala	Pan-STARRS 1	·	1.3 km	MPC · JPL
563696	2016 EK_{13}	—	September 27, 2003	Apache Point	SDSS Collaboration	·	2.1 km	MPC · JPL
563697	2016 EL_{15}	—	November 17, 2014	Haleakala	Pan-STARRS 1	·	2.0 km	MPC · JPL
563698	2016 EQ_{15}	—	May 20, 2012	Mount Lemmon	Mount Lemmon Survey	·	1.8 km	MPC · JPL
563699	2016 EA_{16}	—	November 7, 2010	Mount Lemmon	Mount Lemmon Survey	·	1.6 km	MPC · JPL
563700	2016 EJ_{16}	—	October 2, 2014	Haleakala	Pan-STARRS 1	·	1.6 km	MPC · JPL

== 563701–563800 ==
back to top

Designation			Discovery			Properties		Ref
Permanent	Provisional	Named after	Date	Site	Discoverer(s)	Category	Diam.	Ref
563701	2016 ER_{16}	—	October 7, 2014	Haleakala	Pan-STARRS 1	·	1.8 km	MPC · JPL
563702	2016 EP_{17}	—	May 23, 2011	Mount Lemmon	Mount Lemmon Survey	·	3.3 km	MPC · JPL
563703	2016 EQ_{17}	—	May 24, 2006	Mount Lemmon	Mount Lemmon Survey	·	1.9 km	MPC · JPL
563704	2016 EV_{17}	—	October 3, 2014	Mount Lemmon	Mount Lemmon Survey	·	1.7 km	MPC · JPL
563705	2016 ED_{18}	—	December 8, 2010	Kitt Peak	Spacewatch	·	1.4 km	MPC · JPL
563706	2016 EE_{19}	—	November 25, 2014	Haleakala	Pan-STARRS 1	·	1.7 km	MPC · JPL
563707 Némethgeri	2016 EZ_{19}	Némethgeri	September 28, 2013	Piszkés-tető	K. Sárneczky, T. Csörgei	·	2.6 km	MPC · JPL
563708	2016 EQ_{21}	—	November 19, 2008	Mount Lemmon	Mount Lemmon Survey	EOS	2.0 km	MPC · JPL
563709	2016 EB_{22}	—	October 22, 2008	Kitt Peak	Spacewatch	·	2.3 km	MPC · JPL
563710	2016 EM_{22}	—	October 23, 2013	Haleakala	Pan-STARRS 1	·	2.6 km	MPC · JPL
563711	2016 ES_{22}	—	September 20, 2014	Haleakala	Pan-STARRS 1	HNS	910 m	MPC · JPL
563712	2016 EU_{22}	—	November 22, 2014	Mount Lemmon	Mount Lemmon Survey	·	2.0 km	MPC · JPL
563713	2016 EO_{23}	—	November 6, 2008	Mount Lemmon	Mount Lemmon Survey	·	2.8 km	MPC · JPL
563714	2016 EW_{23}	—	November 19, 2008	Mount Lemmon	Mount Lemmon Survey	·	2.2 km	MPC · JPL
563715	2016 EA_{24}	—	March 3, 2016	Haleakala	Pan-STARRS 1	·	2.6 km	MPC · JPL
563716 Szinyeimersepál	2016 EE_{24}	Szinyeimersepál	October 31, 2013	Piszkéstető	S. Kürti, K. Sárneczky	·	3.2 km	MPC · JPL
563717	2016 EK_{25}	—	October 6, 2013	Mount Lemmon	Mount Lemmon Survey	·	3.3 km	MPC · JPL
563718	2016 EL_{25}	—	December 15, 2014	Mount Lemmon	Mount Lemmon Survey	EOS	1.8 km	MPC · JPL
563719	2016 EP_{25}	—	October 21, 2008	Mount Lemmon	Mount Lemmon Survey	·	1.8 km	MPC · JPL
563720	2016 EQ_{28}	—	January 28, 2007	Kitt Peak	Spacewatch	·	1.9 km	MPC · JPL
563721	2016 EF_{29}	—	September 22, 2009	Kitt Peak	Spacewatch	NEM	2.0 km	MPC · JPL
563722	2016 EM_{29}	—	February 19, 2001	Kitt Peak	Spacewatch	·	1.9 km	MPC · JPL
563723	2016 EQ_{29}	—	October 24, 2005	Mauna Kea	A. Boattini	BRA	1.9 km	MPC · JPL
563724	2016 EY_{29}	—	December 19, 2001	Palomar	NEAT	·	1.5 km	MPC · JPL
563725	2016 EA_{30}	—	February 4, 2016	Haleakala	Pan-STARRS 1	H	510 m	MPC · JPL
563726	2016 EP_{30}	—	November 27, 2014	Haleakala	Pan-STARRS 1	·	1.1 km	MPC · JPL
563727	2016 ET_{30}	—	April 15, 1996	Kitt Peak	Spacewatch	EOS	2.3 km	MPC · JPL
563728	2016 EP_{31}	—	January 27, 2011	Mount Lemmon	Mount Lemmon Survey	·	1.4 km	MPC · JPL
563729	2016 ER_{31}	—	November 28, 2014	Mount Lemmon	Mount Lemmon Survey	·	1.8 km	MPC · JPL
563730	2016 EK_{33}	—	November 21, 2003	Kitt Peak	Spacewatch	·	2.2 km	MPC · JPL
563731	2016 EP_{33}	—	August 19, 2014	Haleakala	Pan-STARRS 1	·	1.6 km	MPC · JPL
563732	2016 EK_{34}	—	December 30, 2005	Kitt Peak	Spacewatch	·	2.0 km	MPC · JPL
563733	2016 ET_{34}	—	October 29, 2005	Kitt Peak	Spacewatch	·	2.0 km	MPC · JPL
563734	2016 EA_{36}	—	October 8, 2008	Kitt Peak	Spacewatch	·	2.1 km	MPC · JPL
563735	2016 EC_{37}	—	September 5, 2008	Kitt Peak	Spacewatch	EOS	1.6 km	MPC · JPL
563736	2016 EW_{37}	—	June 6, 2011	Mount Lemmon	Mount Lemmon Survey	·	3.0 km	MPC · JPL
563737	2016 EC_{38}	—	April 27, 2011	Mount Lemmon	Mount Lemmon Survey	·	2.3 km	MPC · JPL
563738	2016 EA_{39}	—	September 16, 2009	Mount Lemmon	Mount Lemmon Survey	·	2.3 km	MPC · JPL
563739	2016 EY_{39}	—	January 3, 2012	Mount Lemmon	Mount Lemmon Survey	PHO	940 m	MPC · JPL
563740	2016 EA_{40}	—	November 12, 2010	Kitt Peak	Spacewatch	GEF	900 m	MPC · JPL
563741	2016 EX_{40}	—	July 9, 2013	Haleakala	Pan-STARRS 1	EUN	1.2 km	MPC · JPL
563742	2016 EZ_{40}	—	August 5, 2004	Palomar	NEAT	·	2.5 km	MPC · JPL
563743	2016 EC_{41}	—	September 3, 2010	Mount Lemmon	Mount Lemmon Survey	·	1.4 km	MPC · JPL
563744	2016 EF_{41}	—	September 18, 2001	Kitt Peak	Spacewatch	·	1.7 km	MPC · JPL
563745	2016 EE_{42}	—	March 1, 2008	Kitt Peak	Spacewatch	EUN	880 m	MPC · JPL
563746	2016 ER_{42}	—	October 28, 2005	Mount Lemmon	Mount Lemmon Survey	·	1.7 km	MPC · JPL
563747	2016 EY_{42}	—	September 9, 2001	Anderson Mesa	LONEOS	·	1.3 km	MPC · JPL
563748	2016 EV_{43}	—	September 1, 2005	Palomar	NEAT	EUN	1.3 km	MPC · JPL
563749	2016 EC_{44}	—	April 19, 2004	Kitt Peak	Spacewatch	·	1.2 km	MPC · JPL
563750	2016 EY_{45}	—	November 28, 2014	Haleakala	Pan-STARRS 1	(5651)	2.9 km	MPC · JPL
563751	2016 ER_{46}	—	November 17, 2014	Haleakala	Pan-STARRS 1	·	2.0 km	MPC · JPL
563752	2016 EY_{46}	—	November 18, 2014	Mount Lemmon	Mount Lemmon Survey	·	1.6 km	MPC · JPL
563753	2016 EP_{47}	—	October 7, 2008	Mount Lemmon	Mount Lemmon Survey	·	2.1 km	MPC · JPL
563754	2016 ES_{47}	—	December 6, 2010	Catalina	CSS	·	1.3 km	MPC · JPL
563755	2016 EK_{48}	—	February 11, 2016	Haleakala	Pan-STARRS 1	BRA	1.4 km	MPC · JPL
563756	2016 ES_{48}	—	September 30, 2013	Catalina	CSS	·	2.0 km	MPC · JPL
563757	2016 EN_{50}	—	March 4, 2016	Haleakala	Pan-STARRS 1	·	1.8 km	MPC · JPL
563758	2016 EQ_{51}	—	October 2, 2013	Mount Lemmon	Mount Lemmon Survey	·	3.5 km	MPC · JPL
563759	2016 EY_{51}	—	March 30, 2011	Haleakala	Pan-STARRS 1	·	1.8 km	MPC · JPL
563760	2016 EJ_{52}	—	March 3, 2016	Haleakala	Pan-STARRS 1	GEF	1.2 km	MPC · JPL
563761	2016 EM_{52}	—	May 25, 2007	Mount Lemmon	Mount Lemmon Survey	·	1.7 km	MPC · JPL
563762	2016 ER_{52}	—	November 20, 2003	Kitt Peak	Spacewatch	·	2.1 km	MPC · JPL
563763	2016 EA_{53}	—	June 14, 2012	Mount Lemmon	Mount Lemmon Survey	·	2.4 km	MPC · JPL
563764	2016 EN_{53}	—	February 12, 2016	Haleakala	Pan-STARRS 1	·	1.9 km	MPC · JPL
563765	2016 EC_{54}	—	February 13, 2010	Catalina	CSS	TIR	2.9 km	MPC · JPL
563766	2016 ER_{54}	—	October 20, 2007	Mount Lemmon	Mount Lemmon Survey	·	2.3 km	MPC · JPL
563767	2016 ES_{54}	—	May 13, 2011	Kitt Peak	Spacewatch	TEL	1.3 km	MPC · JPL
563768	2016 EQ_{55}	—	July 2, 2014	Haleakala	Pan-STARRS 1	H	440 m	MPC · JPL
563769	2016 EG_{57}	—	July 19, 2006	Bergisch Gladbach	W. Bickel	·	3.1 km	MPC · JPL
563770	2016 EX_{57}	—	December 10, 2010	Mount Lemmon	Mount Lemmon Survey	·	2.0 km	MPC · JPL
563771	2016 EV_{58}	—	February 28, 2012	Haleakala	Pan-STARRS 1	·	1.1 km	MPC · JPL
563772	2016 EA_{59}	—	September 16, 2009	Kitt Peak	Spacewatch	·	1.8 km	MPC · JPL
563773	2016 EL_{59}	—	August 15, 2013	Haleakala	Pan-STARRS 1	·	1.7 km	MPC · JPL
563774	2016 EB_{60}	—	August 15, 2013	Haleakala	Pan-STARRS 1	·	1.6 km	MPC · JPL
563775	2016 EY_{60}	—	March 23, 2003	Kitt Peak	Spacewatch	·	1.7 km	MPC · JPL
563776	2016 EO_{61}	—	December 1, 2005	Kitt Peak	Spacewatch	·	2.3 km	MPC · JPL
563777	2016 EB_{63}	—	January 14, 2015	Haleakala	Pan-STARRS 1	·	3.3 km	MPC · JPL
563778	2016 EE_{63}	—	December 3, 2014	Haleakala	Pan-STARRS 1	·	2.4 km	MPC · JPL
563779	2016 EM_{65}	—	October 5, 2002	Palomar	NEAT	TEL	1.6 km	MPC · JPL
563780	2016 ED_{66}	—	October 1, 2013	Kitt Peak	Spacewatch	·	2.4 km	MPC · JPL
563781	2016 EH_{66}	—	August 28, 2014	Haleakala	Pan-STARRS 1	H	390 m	MPC · JPL
563782	2016 ET_{66}	—	February 20, 2006	Kitt Peak	Spacewatch	·	1.3 km	MPC · JPL
563783	2016 ES_{67}	—	January 14, 2011	Mount Lemmon	Mount Lemmon Survey	·	1.5 km	MPC · JPL
563784	2016 EX_{67}	—	October 3, 2014	Mount Lemmon	Mount Lemmon Survey	·	2.1 km	MPC · JPL
563785	2016 EN_{68}	—	December 9, 2010	Mount Lemmon	Mount Lemmon Survey	·	1.4 km	MPC · JPL
563786	2016 EF_{69}	—	December 30, 2005	Kitt Peak	Spacewatch	·	2.2 km	MPC · JPL
563787	2016 EJ_{69}	—	November 2, 2008	Kitt Peak	Spacewatch	EOS	1.9 km	MPC · JPL
563788	2016 EP_{69}	—	March 5, 2016	Haleakala	Pan-STARRS 1	EOS	2.3 km	MPC · JPL
563789	2016 EF_{70}	—	November 27, 2009	Mount Lemmon	Mount Lemmon Survey	EOS	1.9 km	MPC · JPL
563790	2016 EH_{70}	—	June 6, 2005	Kitt Peak	Spacewatch	·	3.9 km	MPC · JPL
563791	2016 EL_{70}	—	November 24, 2008	Kitt Peak	Spacewatch	·	2.5 km	MPC · JPL
563792	2016 EU_{70}	—	January 16, 2011	Mount Lemmon	Mount Lemmon Survey	·	1.5 km	MPC · JPL
563793	2016 EG_{71}	—	March 10, 2005	Mount Lemmon	Mount Lemmon Survey	EOS	1.7 km	MPC · JPL
563794	2016 EU_{71}	—	August 13, 2012	Haleakala	Pan-STARRS 1	·	3.0 km	MPC · JPL
563795	2016 EJ_{72}	—	April 10, 2005	Kitt Peak	Deep Ecliptic Survey	·	3.5 km	MPC · JPL
563796	2016 EV_{73}	—	April 17, 2005	Kitt Peak	Spacewatch	·	2.8 km	MPC · JPL
563797	2016 EX_{73}	—	April 27, 2011	Haleakala	Pan-STARRS 1	EOS	2.5 km	MPC · JPL
563798	2016 ER_{74}	—	September 8, 2004	Apache Point	G. A. Esquerdo, J. C. Barentine	·	2.3 km	MPC · JPL
563799	2016 EN_{75}	—	July 14, 2013	Haleakala	Pan-STARRS 1	NEM	1.8 km	MPC · JPL
563800	2016 EX_{75}	—	July 30, 2013	Kitt Peak	Spacewatch	MRX	920 m	MPC · JPL

== 563801–563900 ==
back to top

Designation			Discovery			Properties		Ref
Permanent	Provisional	Named after	Date	Site	Discoverer(s)	Category	Diam.	Ref
563801	2016 ES_{77}	—	October 3, 2006	Mount Lemmon	Mount Lemmon Survey	·	860 m	MPC · JPL
563802	2016 EE_{78}	—	September 1, 2013	Haleakala	Pan-STARRS 1	·	3.1 km	MPC · JPL
563803	2016 EJ_{78}	—	October 3, 2014	Mount Lemmon	Mount Lemmon Survey	·	1.9 km	MPC · JPL
563804	2016 EH_{79}	—	January 18, 2015	Mount Lemmon	Mount Lemmon Survey	·	3.5 km	MPC · JPL
563805	2016 EK_{79}	—	January 13, 2015	Haleakala	Pan-STARRS 1	·	1.5 km	MPC · JPL
563806	2016 EY_{79}	—	October 27, 2008	Mount Lemmon	Mount Lemmon Survey	·	3.0 km	MPC · JPL
563807	2016 ET_{80}	—	May 20, 2012	Mount Lemmon	Mount Lemmon Survey	·	2.3 km	MPC · JPL
563808	2016 EV_{80}	—	February 3, 2002	Haleakala	NEAT	·	2.2 km	MPC · JPL
563809	2016 EW_{80}	—	April 16, 2008	Mount Lemmon	Mount Lemmon Survey	·	1.6 km	MPC · JPL
563810	2016 EZ_{80}	—	December 30, 2010	Piszkés-tető	K. Sárneczky, Z. Kuli	·	1.8 km	MPC · JPL
563811	2016 EQ_{81}	—	December 10, 2014	Mount Lemmon	Mount Lemmon Survey	·	2.5 km	MPC · JPL
563812	2016 EV_{81}	—	November 26, 2014	Haleakala	Pan-STARRS 1	EOS	2.1 km	MPC · JPL
563813	2016 EW_{81}	—	November 21, 2009	Kitt Peak	Spacewatch	EOS	2.0 km	MPC · JPL
563814	2016 EC_{82}	—	February 3, 2016	Haleakala	Pan-STARRS 1	·	1.5 km	MPC · JPL
563815	2016 EZ_{82}	—	February 3, 2016	Haleakala	Pan-STARRS 1	NAE	2.8 km	MPC · JPL
563816	2016 EB_{83}	—	November 4, 2013	Mount Lemmon	Mount Lemmon Survey	·	1.6 km	MPC · JPL
563817	2016 EU_{86}	—	December 15, 2010	Mount Lemmon	Mount Lemmon Survey	BRA	1.9 km	MPC · JPL
563818	2016 ER_{87}	—	December 23, 2008	Dauban	C. Rinner, Kugel, F.	·	2.9 km	MPC · JPL
563819	2016 EC_{88}	—	October 1, 2005	Kitt Peak	Spacewatch	·	2.0 km	MPC · JPL
563820	2016 EJ_{88}	—	September 26, 2009	Zadko	Todd, M.	H	530 m	MPC · JPL
563821	2016 EN_{90}	—	March 29, 2011	Mount Lemmon	Mount Lemmon Survey	KOR	1.4 km	MPC · JPL
563822	2016 EB_{93}	—	October 23, 2003	Kitt Peak	Spacewatch	·	2.6 km	MPC · JPL
563823	2016 EC_{93}	—	March 9, 2011	Mount Lemmon	Mount Lemmon Survey	·	1.7 km	MPC · JPL
563824	2016 EW_{94}	—	November 22, 2014	Mount Lemmon	Mount Lemmon Survey	·	2.3 km	MPC · JPL
563825	2016 EL_{95}	—	November 26, 2014	Haleakala	Pan-STARRS 1	·	1.4 km	MPC · JPL
563826	2016 EH_{96}	—	October 5, 2014	Mount Lemmon	Mount Lemmon Survey	EOS	1.6 km	MPC · JPL
563827	2016 EM_{97}	—	November 17, 2014	Haleakala	Pan-STARRS 1	·	2.6 km	MPC · JPL
563828	2016 ET_{97}	—	January 5, 2003	Kitt Peak	Deep Lens Survey	·	1.4 km	MPC · JPL
563829	2016 EZ_{97}	—	December 18, 2004	Kitt Peak	Spacewatch	·	2.1 km	MPC · JPL
563830	2016 EH_{98}	—	April 23, 2012	Kitt Peak	Spacewatch	·	1.8 km	MPC · JPL
563831	2016 ER_{98}	—	March 26, 2011	Mount Lemmon	Mount Lemmon Survey	·	1.8 km	MPC · JPL
563832	2016 EG_{99}	—	October 20, 2014	Kitt Peak	Spacewatch	TEL	1.2 km	MPC · JPL
563833	2016 EY_{102}	—	November 23, 2014	Haleakala	Pan-STARRS 1	·	1.4 km	MPC · JPL
563834	2016 EO_{103}	—	November 19, 2014	Mount Lemmon	Mount Lemmon Survey	·	1.8 km	MPC · JPL
563835	2016 EV_{103}	—	October 18, 2009	Mount Lemmon	Mount Lemmon Survey	·	2.0 km	MPC · JPL
563836	2016 EW_{103}	—	January 30, 2011	Mayhill-ISON	L. Elenin	·	2.1 km	MPC · JPL
563837	2016 EV_{106}	—	March 7, 2016	Haleakala	Pan-STARRS 1	526	1.9 km	MPC · JPL
563838	2016 EK_{108}	—	September 15, 2004	Kitt Peak	Spacewatch	AST	1.7 km	MPC · JPL
563839	2016 EY_{108}	—	September 29, 2003	Kitt Peak	Spacewatch	KOR	1.7 km	MPC · JPL
563840	2016 EW_{109}	—	November 12, 2014	Haleakala	Pan-STARRS 1	·	1.7 km	MPC · JPL
563841	2016 EJ_{110}	—	February 13, 2011	Mount Lemmon	Mount Lemmon Survey	·	2.2 km	MPC · JPL
563842	2016 EU_{111}	—	March 24, 2003	Kitt Peak	Spacewatch	·	1.9 km	MPC · JPL
563843	2016 EY_{112}	—	February 7, 2006	Catalina	CSS	·	1.4 km	MPC · JPL
563844	2016 EZ_{113}	—	December 14, 2010	Mount Lemmon	Mount Lemmon Survey	·	1.3 km	MPC · JPL
563845	2016 EE_{114}	—	January 7, 2006	Kitt Peak	Spacewatch	·	1.4 km	MPC · JPL
563846	2016 EW_{114}	—	January 22, 2006	Mount Lemmon	Mount Lemmon Survey	·	1.7 km	MPC · JPL
563847	2016 EP_{117}	—	December 9, 2015	Haleakala	Pan-STARRS 1	HNS	1.2 km	MPC · JPL
563848	2016 EC_{118}	—	November 18, 2009	Kitt Peak	Spacewatch	·	1.5 km	MPC · JPL
563849	2016 ES_{118}	—	September 29, 2005	Kitt Peak	Spacewatch	·	1.3 km	MPC · JPL
563850	2016 EG_{119}	—	March 26, 2007	Mount Lemmon	Mount Lemmon Survey	·	1.6 km	MPC · JPL
563851	2016 EH_{120}	—	December 21, 2006	Kitt Peak	L. H. Wasserman, M. W. Buie	·	1.4 km	MPC · JPL
563852	2016 EK_{120}	—	March 14, 2007	Mount Lemmon	Mount Lemmon Survey	·	2.2 km	MPC · JPL
563853 Andrewdubeyjames	2016 EV_{120}	Andrewdubeyjames	January 8, 2011	Mayhill	Falla, N.	·	2.6 km	MPC · JPL
563854	2016 EC_{121}	—	January 27, 2011	Kitt Peak	Spacewatch	·	2.3 km	MPC · JPL
563855	2016 EJ_{121}	—	September 30, 2005	Mount Lemmon	Mount Lemmon Survey	·	1.4 km	MPC · JPL
563856	2016 ET_{121}	—	October 10, 2010	Mount Lemmon	Mount Lemmon Survey	·	1.5 km	MPC · JPL
563857	2016 EA_{123}	—	February 8, 2002	Kitt Peak	Spacewatch	PAD	1.6 km	MPC · JPL
563858	2016 EB_{123}	—	October 9, 2008	Mount Lemmon	Mount Lemmon Survey	EOS	1.4 km	MPC · JPL
563859	2016 EN_{123}	—	March 10, 2007	Mount Lemmon	Mount Lemmon Survey	·	1.4 km	MPC · JPL
563860	2016 EP_{123}	—	August 14, 2013	Haleakala	Pan-STARRS 1	·	2.6 km	MPC · JPL
563861	2016 EQ_{124}	—	April 15, 2013	Haleakala	Pan-STARRS 1	·	440 m	MPC · JPL
563862	2016 EB_{125}	—	May 14, 2005	Mount Lemmon	Mount Lemmon Survey	·	830 m	MPC · JPL
563863	2016 ED_{125}	—	August 15, 2013	Haleakala	Pan-STARRS 1	·	1.6 km	MPC · JPL
563864	2016 EF_{126}	—	March 28, 2012	Mount Lemmon	Mount Lemmon Survey	(1547)	1.2 km	MPC · JPL
563865	2016 EN_{126}	—	September 12, 2002	Palomar	NEAT	·	1.8 km	MPC · JPL
563866	2016 EM_{127}	—	January 27, 2011	Mount Lemmon	Mount Lemmon Survey	AGN	950 m	MPC · JPL
563867	2016 EP_{128}	—	February 26, 2007	Mount Lemmon	Mount Lemmon Survey	·	1.9 km	MPC · JPL
563868	2016 EB_{132}	—	October 28, 2014	Mount Lemmon	Mount Lemmon Survey	·	1.3 km	MPC · JPL
563869	2016 EG_{132}	—	September 4, 2008	Kitt Peak	Spacewatch	AEO	1.1 km	MPC · JPL
563870	2016 EF_{135}	—	March 9, 2007	Kitt Peak	Spacewatch	WIT	820 m	MPC · JPL
563871	2016 EW_{135}	—	September 15, 2007	Mount Lemmon	Mount Lemmon Survey	EOS	1.7 km	MPC · JPL
563872	2016 EZ_{135}	—	September 1, 2013	Mount Lemmon	Mount Lemmon Survey	·	3.2 km	MPC · JPL
563873	2016 EE_{136}	—	October 18, 2003	Apache Point	SDSS Collaboration	KOR	1.4 km	MPC · JPL
563874	2016 EU_{136}	—	April 3, 2011	Haleakala	Pan-STARRS 1	EOS	2.0 km	MPC · JPL
563875	2016 EV_{136}	—	September 25, 2013	Catalina	CSS	EOS	1.8 km	MPC · JPL
563876	2016 EJ_{137}	—	April 22, 2007	Kitt Peak	Spacewatch	·	1.6 km	MPC · JPL
563877	2016 EL_{137}	—	February 10, 2016	Haleakala	Pan-STARRS 1	·	1.8 km	MPC · JPL
563878	2016 EF_{138}	—	August 21, 2008	Kitt Peak	Spacewatch	KOR	1.8 km	MPC · JPL
563879	2016 EJ_{139}	—	March 10, 2016	Mount Lemmon	Mount Lemmon Survey	·	2.8 km	MPC · JPL
563880	2016 EO_{139}	—	October 29, 2008	Mount Lemmon	Mount Lemmon Survey	NAE	1.8 km	MPC · JPL
563881	2016 EK_{140}	—	August 28, 2002	Palomar	NEAT	·	3.2 km	MPC · JPL
563882	2016 EM_{140}	—	February 25, 2006	Mount Lemmon	Mount Lemmon Survey	·	1.7 km	MPC · JPL
563883	2016 EV_{140}	—	February 5, 2011	Haleakala	Pan-STARRS 1	HOF	1.8 km	MPC · JPL
563884	2016 EY_{140}	—	September 18, 2003	Kitt Peak	Spacewatch	EOS	1.4 km	MPC · JPL
563885	2016 ET_{142}	—	September 9, 2013	Haleakala	Pan-STARRS 1	·	1.8 km	MPC · JPL
563886	2016 EA_{143}	—	April 15, 2007	Kitt Peak	Spacewatch	HOF	2.4 km	MPC · JPL
563887	2016 EG_{143}	—	September 19, 2008	Kitt Peak	Spacewatch	·	1.8 km	MPC · JPL
563888	2016 EJ_{143}	—	October 4, 2007	Kitt Peak	Spacewatch	VER	2.9 km	MPC · JPL
563889	2016 EH_{144}	—	March 13, 2005	Kitt Peak	Spacewatch	HYG	2.4 km	MPC · JPL
563890	2016 EM_{144}	—	March 27, 2012	Kitt Peak	Spacewatch	·	1.1 km	MPC · JPL
563891	2016 EO_{145}	—	March 10, 2016	Haleakala	Pan-STARRS 1	·	1.7 km	MPC · JPL
563892	2016 EU_{146}	—	April 9, 2003	Palomar	NEAT	JUN	1.1 km	MPC · JPL
563893	2016 EG_{147}	—	August 14, 2013	Haleakala	Pan-STARRS 1	·	2.1 km	MPC · JPL
563894	2016 EV_{147}	—	March 16, 2007	Mount Lemmon	Mount Lemmon Survey	·	2.1 km	MPC · JPL
563895	2016 EX_{147}	—	January 17, 2015	Mount Lemmon	Mount Lemmon Survey	·	2.8 km	MPC · JPL
563896	2016 ER_{148}	—	September 5, 2013	Kitt Peak	Spacewatch	EMA	2.9 km	MPC · JPL
563897	2016 ED_{149}	—	March 10, 2016	Haleakala	Pan-STARRS 1	·	2.5 km	MPC · JPL
563898	2016 EA_{150}	—	May 10, 2005	Cerro Tololo	Deep Ecliptic Survey	·	2.6 km	MPC · JPL
563899	2016 EH_{150}	—	January 17, 2004	Palomar	NEAT	EOS	2.1 km	MPC · JPL
563900	2016 EY_{150}	—	August 15, 2013	Haleakala	Pan-STARRS 1	·	1.9 km	MPC · JPL

== 563901–564000 ==
back to top

Designation			Discovery			Properties		Ref
Permanent	Provisional	Named after	Date	Site	Discoverer(s)	Category	Diam.	Ref
563901	2016 EK_{151}	—	September 24, 2008	Mount Lemmon	Mount Lemmon Survey	EOS	1.7 km	MPC · JPL
563902	2016 EN_{151}	—	September 4, 2013	Mount Lemmon	Mount Lemmon Survey	·	2.8 km	MPC · JPL
563903	2016 EY_{151}	—	November 21, 2009	Mount Lemmon	Mount Lemmon Survey	·	2.1 km	MPC · JPL
563904	2016 EK_{152}	—	February 13, 2011	Mount Lemmon	Mount Lemmon Survey	·	1.6 km	MPC · JPL
563905	2016 EW_{152}	—	October 15, 2001	Palomar	NEAT	ADE	1.8 km	MPC · JPL
563906	2016 EB_{153}	—	November 7, 2010	Catalina	CSS	MAR	1.2 km	MPC · JPL
563907	2016 EW_{153}	—	March 4, 2006	Kitt Peak	Spacewatch	·	1.7 km	MPC · JPL
563908	2016 ED_{154}	—	January 27, 2007	Kitt Peak	Spacewatch	·	1.3 km	MPC · JPL
563909	2016 EB_{159}	—	May 17, 2012	Mount Lemmon	Mount Lemmon Survey	MRX	900 m	MPC · JPL
563910	2016 EQ_{160}	—	February 10, 2011	Mount Lemmon	Mount Lemmon Survey	·	1.5 km	MPC · JPL
563911	2016 EZ_{163}	—	December 8, 2010	Mount Lemmon	Mount Lemmon Survey	·	1.3 km	MPC · JPL
563912	2016 EJ_{165}	—	September 29, 2009	Mount Lemmon	Mount Lemmon Survey	(5)	1.1 km	MPC · JPL
563913	2016 ES_{165}	—	September 6, 2008	Mount Lemmon	Mount Lemmon Survey	·	1.4 km	MPC · JPL
563914	2016 EU_{165}	—	March 26, 2007	Mount Lemmon	Mount Lemmon Survey	AEO	930 m	MPC · JPL
563915	2016 EK_{166}	—	March 6, 2011	Mount Lemmon	Mount Lemmon Survey	AGN	940 m	MPC · JPL
563916	2016 EN_{166}	—	March 16, 2005	Mount Lemmon	Mount Lemmon Survey	·	2.5 km	MPC · JPL
563917	2016 EC_{167}	—	September 6, 2008	Mount Lemmon	Mount Lemmon Survey	KOR	1.2 km	MPC · JPL
563918	2016 EB_{168}	—	March 11, 2005	Kitt Peak	Spacewatch	·	3.5 km	MPC · JPL
563919	2016 EN_{168}	—	February 10, 2011	Mount Lemmon	Mount Lemmon Survey	HOF	1.9 km	MPC · JPL
563920	2016 EX_{169}	—	September 5, 2013	Kitt Peak	Spacewatch	·	2.5 km	MPC · JPL
563921	2016 EZ_{170}	—	August 6, 2005	Palomar	NEAT	·	1.2 km	MPC · JPL
563922	2016 EB_{171}	—	August 7, 2008	Kitt Peak	Spacewatch	KOR	1.4 km	MPC · JPL
563923	2016 EB_{172}	—	November 29, 1999	Kitt Peak	Spacewatch	KOR	1.1 km	MPC · JPL
563924	2016 EH_{172}	—	April 25, 2007	Kitt Peak	Spacewatch	DOR	1.8 km	MPC · JPL
563925	2016 EL_{173}	—	April 27, 2012	Mount Lemmon	Mount Lemmon Survey	·	2.0 km	MPC · JPL
563926	2016 EY_{174}	—	March 14, 2012	Haleakala	Pan-STARRS 1	HNS	1.4 km	MPC · JPL
563927	2016 EB_{175}	—	June 20, 2001	Haleakala	NEAT	·	2.4 km	MPC · JPL
563928	2016 EH_{176}	—	November 11, 2004	Kitt Peak	Deep Ecliptic Survey	·	1.4 km	MPC · JPL
563929	2016 EP_{176}	—	September 5, 2008	Kitt Peak	Spacewatch	·	1.8 km	MPC · JPL
563930	2016 EY_{176}	—	May 6, 2006	Kitt Peak	Spacewatch	·	1.8 km	MPC · JPL
563931	2016 EG_{177}	—	November 20, 2003	Socorro	LINEAR	·	2.2 km	MPC · JPL
563932	2016 EB_{179}	—	April 2, 2005	Mount Lemmon	Mount Lemmon Survey	·	2.3 km	MPC · JPL
563933	2016 EJ_{179}	—	August 22, 2004	Kitt Peak	Spacewatch	MIS	2.4 km	MPC · JPL
563934	2016 ET_{179}	—	September 6, 2008	Kitt Peak	Spacewatch	·	1.4 km	MPC · JPL
563935	2016 EQ_{180}	—	February 15, 2010	Mount Lemmon	Mount Lemmon Survey	·	1.9 km	MPC · JPL
563936	2016 EU_{181}	—	November 27, 2014	Haleakala	Pan-STARRS 1	·	1.4 km	MPC · JPL
563937	2016 ED_{182}	—	August 19, 2006	Anderson Mesa	LONEOS	·	1.9 km	MPC · JPL
563938	2016 EC_{183}	—	May 8, 2008	Kitt Peak	Spacewatch	MAR	1.1 km	MPC · JPL
563939	2016 ED_{184}	—	May 26, 2008	Kitt Peak	Spacewatch	·	1.5 km	MPC · JPL
563940	2016 EK_{184}	—	March 12, 2016	Haleakala	Pan-STARRS 1	·	2.7 km	MPC · JPL
563941	2016 EA_{185}	—	October 27, 2009	Kitt Peak	Spacewatch	·	1.7 km	MPC · JPL
563942	2016 EU_{185}	—	February 26, 2011	Mount Lemmon	Mount Lemmon Survey	·	1.7 km	MPC · JPL
563943	2016 EW_{185}	—	September 6, 2013	Mount Lemmon	Mount Lemmon Survey	·	1.9 km	MPC · JPL
563944	2016 EE_{186}	—	August 28, 2009	Kitt Peak	Spacewatch	HNS	910 m	MPC · JPL
563945	2016 EP_{187}	—	April 21, 2012	Catalina	CSS	·	1.7 km	MPC · JPL
563946	2016 EX_{188}	—	November 25, 2005	Kitt Peak	Spacewatch	·	2.3 km	MPC · JPL
563947	2016 EX_{192}	—	October 13, 2013	Kitt Peak	Spacewatch	·	1.7 km	MPC · JPL
563948	2016 EZ_{192}	—	January 8, 2003	Socorro	LINEAR	·	1.5 km	MPC · JPL
563949	2016 EN_{195}	—	November 26, 2005	Mount Lemmon	Mount Lemmon Survey	·	1.4 km	MPC · JPL
563950	2016 EU_{198}	—	September 20, 2008	Catalina	CSS	·	2.3 km	MPC · JPL
563951	2016 EV_{198}	—	March 15, 2016	Haleakala	Pan-STARRS 1	·	1.5 km	MPC · JPL
563952	2016 EA_{199}	—	January 23, 2011	Mount Lemmon	Mount Lemmon Survey	·	1.6 km	MPC · JPL
563953	2016 EF_{199}	—	April 1, 2008	Kitt Peak	Spacewatch	·	1.0 km	MPC · JPL
563954	2016 ED_{200}	—	October 29, 2008	Mount Lemmon	Mount Lemmon Survey	EOS	1.7 km	MPC · JPL
563955	2016 EU_{200}	—	April 2, 2003	Cerro Tololo	Deep Lens Survey	·	1.9 km	MPC · JPL
563956	2016 EY_{200}	—	March 29, 2012	Kitt Peak	Spacewatch	·	1.1 km	MPC · JPL
563957	2016 EX_{201}	—	October 22, 2014	Mount Lemmon	Mount Lemmon Survey	·	2.6 km	MPC · JPL
563958	2016 EL_{202}	—	September 29, 2009	Kitt Peak	Spacewatch	HOF	1.9 km	MPC · JPL
563959	2016 EN_{202}	—	March 28, 2011	Kitt Peak	Spacewatch	·	2.7 km	MPC · JPL
563960	2016 EQ_{202}	—	April 30, 2003	Kitt Peak	Spacewatch	·	1.8 km	MPC · JPL
563961	2016 EE_{203}	—	October 30, 2005	Mount Lemmon	Mount Lemmon Survey	·	2.2 km	MPC · JPL
563962	2016 EY_{203}	—	February 28, 2008	Kitt Peak	Spacewatch	H	380 m	MPC · JPL
563963	2016 EA_{204}	—	October 31, 2012	Haleakala	Pan-STARRS 1	H	450 m	MPC · JPL
563964	2016 EB_{204}	—	September 28, 2009	Mount Lemmon	Mount Lemmon Survey	H	530 m	MPC · JPL
563965	2016 EJ_{204}	—	October 13, 2014	Mount Lemmon	Mount Lemmon Survey	H	400 m	MPC · JPL
563966	2016 ER_{205}	—	April 21, 2006	Kitt Peak	Spacewatch	H	340 m	MPC · JPL
563967	2016 EK_{206}	—	March 4, 2016	Haleakala	Pan-STARRS 1	H	380 m	MPC · JPL
563968	2016 EQ_{211}	—	August 8, 2013	Kitt Peak	Spacewatch	KOR	1.1 km	MPC · JPL
563969	2016 EH_{212}	—	September 4, 2008	Kitt Peak	Spacewatch	·	1.7 km	MPC · JPL
563970	2016 EQ_{214}	—	November 16, 2006	Mount Lemmon	Mount Lemmon Survey	·	2.3 km	MPC · JPL
563971	2016 EA_{215}	—	September 16, 2006	Catalina	CSS	·	2.8 km	MPC · JPL
563972	2016 EN_{215}	—	January 20, 2015	Mount Lemmon	Mount Lemmon Survey	·	2.1 km	MPC · JPL
563973	2016 EV_{215}	—	May 11, 2005	Mount Lemmon	Mount Lemmon Survey	·	2.8 km	MPC · JPL
563974	2016 ER_{216}	—	March 13, 2016	Haleakala	Pan-STARRS 1	·	1.5 km	MPC · JPL
563975	2016 ES_{216}	—	March 8, 2005	Mount Lemmon	Mount Lemmon Survey	·	2.2 km	MPC · JPL
563976	2016 EW_{216}	—	April 6, 1994	Kitt Peak	Spacewatch	·	3.2 km	MPC · JPL
563977	2016 ET_{217}	—	March 4, 2016	Haleakala	Pan-STARRS 1	AGN	920 m	MPC · JPL
563978	2016 EB_{218}	—	March 7, 2016	Haleakala	Pan-STARRS 1	·	1.4 km	MPC · JPL
563979	2016 EK_{218}	—	August 12, 2013	Haleakala	Pan-STARRS 1	·	1.5 km	MPC · JPL
563980	2016 ER_{218}	—	October 23, 2009	Mount Lemmon	Mount Lemmon Survey	·	1.6 km	MPC · JPL
563981	2016 ES_{218}	—	April 5, 2011	Kitt Peak	Spacewatch	EOS	1.5 km	MPC · JPL
563982	2016 EE_{219}	—	July 31, 2014	Haleakala	Pan-STARRS 1	BRG	1.3 km	MPC · JPL
563983	2016 EY_{219}	—	August 23, 2007	Kitt Peak	Spacewatch	EOS	1.8 km	MPC · JPL
563984	2016 EZ_{219}	—	January 16, 2015	Haleakala	Pan-STARRS 1	·	2.1 km	MPC · JPL
563985	2016 EE_{220}	—	September 13, 2007	Kitt Peak	Spacewatch	·	2.4 km	MPC · JPL
563986	2016 EF_{220}	—	January 14, 2015	Haleakala	Pan-STARRS 1	·	1.8 km	MPC · JPL
563987	2016 EO_{220}	—	September 12, 2007	Mount Lemmon	Mount Lemmon Survey	·	2.1 km	MPC · JPL
563988	2016 EY_{220}	—	April 2, 2011	Kitt Peak	Spacewatch	EOS	1.9 km	MPC · JPL
563989	2016 ED_{221}	—	February 19, 2010	Mount Lemmon	Mount Lemmon Survey	·	2.5 km	MPC · JPL
563990	2016 EG_{221}	—	November 3, 2007	Mount Lemmon	Mount Lemmon Survey	·	2.9 km	MPC · JPL
563991	2016 ET_{221}	—	March 14, 2016	Mount Lemmon	Mount Lemmon Survey	·	1.8 km	MPC · JPL
563992	2016 EA_{222}	—	December 11, 1998	Kitt Peak	Spacewatch	EOS	1.9 km	MPC · JPL
563993	2016 EZ_{222}	—	February 28, 2012	Haleakala	Pan-STARRS 1	·	850 m	MPC · JPL
563994	2016 EX_{224}	—	December 3, 2014	Haleakala	Pan-STARRS 1	·	1.5 km	MPC · JPL
563995	2016 EG_{225}	—	December 24, 2014	Mount Lemmon	Mount Lemmon Survey	·	1.9 km	MPC · JPL
563996	2016 EK_{225}	—	October 3, 1999	Kitt Peak	Spacewatch	·	1.4 km	MPC · JPL
563997	2016 EP_{225}	—	September 19, 2009	Kitt Peak	Spacewatch	HOF	2.1 km	MPC · JPL
563998	2016 EY_{225}	—	September 27, 2009	Mount Lemmon	Mount Lemmon Survey	·	1.4 km	MPC · JPL
563999	2016 EJ_{226}	—	November 24, 2011	Haleakala	Pan-STARRS 1	·	550 m	MPC · JPL
564000	2016 EB_{227}	—	October 19, 2000	Kitt Peak	Spacewatch	·	1.3 km	MPC · JPL

back to top

== Meaning of names ==
As minor planet discoveries are confirmed, they are given a permanent number by the IAU's Minor Planet Center (MPC), and the discoverers can then submit names for them, following the IAU's naming conventions. The list below concerns those minor planets in the specified number-range that have received names, and explains the meanings of those names.

Official naming citations of newly named small Solar System bodies are approved and published in a bulletin by IAU's Working Group for Small Bodies Nomenclature (WGSBN). Before May 2021, citations were published in MPC's Minor Planet Circulars for many decades. Recent citations can also be found on the JPL Small-Body Database (SBDB). Until his death in 2016, German astronomer Lutz D. Schmadel compiled these citations into the Dictionary of Minor Planet Names (DMP) and regularly updated the collection.

Based on Paul Herget's The Names of the Minor Planets, Schmadel also researched the unclear origin of numerous asteroids, most of which had been named prior to World War II. This article incorporates text from this source, which is in the public domain: SBDB New namings may only be added to this list below after official publication as the preannouncement of names is condemned. The WGSBN publishes a comprehensive guideline for the naming rules of non-cometary small Solar System bodies.

Named minor planet	Provisional	This minor planet was named for...	Ref · Catalog
563197 ʻIke Leʻa	2016 CL_{41}	ʻIke Leʻa is the name of the Science Building and observatory at the University of Hawaii Maui College (UHMC) and was chosen to represent the philosophy of engaging students in active learning and understanding. ʻIke leʻa means "to see clearly" in the Hawaiian language.	IAU · 563197
563285 Reinerschwarz	2016 CS_{107}	Reiner Schwarz, Canadian radio and television personality known for his late-night talk shows on CHUM-FM in Toronto, Canada.	IAU · 563285
563318 ten Kate	2016 CD_{144}	Inge Loes ten Kate (born 1976) is a Dutch astrobiologist and planetologist at Utrecht University. She is a specialist on Martian geoscience and has helped to develop instruments for the Mars rover Curiosity (Src).	IAU · 563318
563707 Némethgeri	2016 EZ_{19}	Gregor “Geri” Németh, Slovak amateur astronomer	IAU · 563707
563716 Szinyeimersepál	2016 EE_{24}	Pál Szinyei Merse (1845–1920) a Hungarian painter and one of the most influential figures in Hungarian art, being the first true colorist in the history of Hungarian painting.	IAU · 563716
563853 Andrewdubeyjames	2016 EV_{120}	Andrew Dubey James, son-in-law of the discoverer.	IAU · 563853
