= Henriette Ivanans =

Canadian actress and writer (born 1968)

- Born: October 29, 1968 (age 57); Toronto, Ontario, Canada
- Other names: Henriete Ivanāns
- Occupation: actress

Henriette Ivanans (Latvian: Henriete Ivanāns, born October 29, 1968) is a Canadian actress and writer.

== Early life and education ==
Ivanans is of Latvian and Danish heritage; her father is from Riga, and her mother is from Copenhagen. She is a graduate of Ryerson Theatre School in Toronto.

== Career ==
Ivanans appeared for two seasons on the hit CBC series Liberty Street as well as making many notable theatre performances in Toronto including the Shaw Festival in Niagara-on-the-Lake, Ontario. After many years in Canadian and American television work, she moved to Los Angeles and continues to work in television and film, most recently in JAG, Strong Medicine, Star Trek: Voyager and the film Smother, which stars Diane Keaton, Liv Tyler, and Dax Shepard.

She is the author of In Pillness and in Health, a memoir about her recovery from drugs and alcohol during her kidney transplant where her husband was the donor.

== Filmography ==
=== Film ===
| Year | Title | Role | Notes |
|---|---|---|---|
| 2008 | Smother | Therapy Receptionist | |
| 2020 | Trust Me, I'm Sick | — | Documentary |
| 2023 | Polarized | Doctor | |

=== Television ===
| Year | Title | Role | Notes |
|---|---|---|---|
| 1992 | Borderline High | Dixie | Television film |
| 1992 | Amy Fisher: My Story | Darlene | Television film |
| 1993 | Class of '96 | Lisa | Episode: "The Accused" |
| 1993 | Shattered Trust: The Shari Karney Story | Kelly | Television film |
| 1993 | JFK: Reckless Youth | Fan #1 | 2 episodes |
| 1994 | I Know My Son Is Alive | Psychology Student | Television film |
| 1994 | Model by Day | Assistant | Television film |
| 1994–1995 | Liberty Street | Annie Hammer | 26 episodes |
| 1995 | Road to Avonlea | Miss Barlow | Episode: "A Fox Tale" |
| 1995 | Choices of the Heart: The Margaret Sanger Story | Sadie Sachs | Television film |
| 1997 | What Happened to Bobby Earl? | Jenny Kozinski | Television film |
| 2000 | Star Trek: Voyager | Maggie O'Halloran | 2 episodes |
| 2003 | JAG | Lt. Pamela Hamilton | Episode: "Complications" |
| 2020 | Sweet Autumn | Aunt Dee | Television film |
| 2021 | Love Strikes Twice | Judge | Television film |
