= Liberty Street (TV series) =

- Written by: William Flaherty; Jackie May
- Directed by: Gail Harvey; Nicholas Kendall
- Starring: Pat Mastroianni; Kimberly Huie; Joel Bissonnette; Henriette Ivanans; Billy Merasty; Marcia Laskowski; L. Dean Ifill
- Opening theme: "Ritual" by Cowboy Junkies
- Country of origin: Canada
- Original language: English
- No. of seasons: 2
- No. of episodes: 26

Production
- Production locations: Toronto, Ontario, Canada
- Running time: 30 minutes
- Production company: Epitome Pictures

Original release
- Network: CBC Television
- Release: January 11, 1995 – December 1995

Liberty Street is a Canadian drama television series that aired on CBC Television in 1995. An ensemble cast drama, it centred on the tenants of an apartment building in Toronto, Ontario.

Produced by Kit Hood and Linda Schuyler, the team behind the long-running Degrassi series of television shows, Liberty Street was an attempt to create a similar series depicting the lives of a group of young adults living on their own for the first time.

== Background ==
The pilot film, X-Rated, aired on February 27, 1994. Although it was picked up to series, it was retitled as Liberty Street and some of the roles were rewritten and recast.

The series premiered on January 11, 1995, with 13 episodes in its first season. It was renewed for a second season, which premiered on September 16, 1995. After the second season completed its run in late fall 1995, the CBC announced in February 1996 that it would not renew the series for a third season.

== Cast and characters ==
- Joel Bissonnette as Mack Fischer (season 1), superintendent of the building and a recovering crack addict
- Kimberly Huie as Janet Beecher, single mother and law student from Dartmouth
- Melissa Daniel as Christine "Chris" Beecher, Janet's 7-year-old daughter
- Henriette Ivanans as Annie Hammer, hippie idealist, Frank's ex-fling
- Jhene Erwin as Teena Siracus (season 1), Frank’s jealous and sexually possessive girlfriend
- Katherine Ashby as Lucille Trudeau, runs a retro diner in the Pit's basement
- Richard Zeppieri as Ernie Kravitz, Lucille's husband
- Dean Paras as Stuart Ball, an anti-social, nihilistic, conspiracy theorist
- L. Dean Ifill as Wade Malone, aspiring musician and radical
- Marcia Laskowski as Marsha Velasquez, promiscuous bike courier
- Billy Merasty as Nathan Jones, Native-Canadian bike courier and Marsha's roommate, who is having problems with his supervisor because he's gay
- Pat Mastroianni as Frank Pagnozzi, nephew of the building's owner
- Reiner Schwarz as Drive Home Dave, DJ and owner of the building

The apartment building was known as the "Epitome" — an insider reference to Epitome Pictures, the company which produced the series — but was nicknamed by the characters as "the Pit".

The original pilot X-Rated (named in reference to Gen X) featured Gordon Michael Woolvett as Tony Foster, a recent business school graduate who purchases the building, Stacie Mistysyn as River Owen, his free-spirited love interest, Richard Yearwood as Wilson Carlisle and Richard Chevolleau as Flex Roy, owners of a silk-screening business in the building, and Barry Flatman and Kate Lynch as Harold Mason and Louise Foster, Tony's stepfather and mother. In the television series, Drive Home Dave replaces Tony as the owner of the building, with Frank and Annie replacing Tony and River's dynamic from the pilot.

In the second season, four new recurring characters were added: Ben (Hamish McEwan), a civil servant; Cynthia (Nahanni Johnstone), a style-conscious woman with designs on marrying Frank; Lionel (Jim Codrington), Janet's ex-boyfriend; and James (Keith Knight), Nathan's new partner.

== Production ==
Most of the show was shot in and around the Liberty Village area of Toronto.

The series received a $250,000 grant from the federal Ministry of Health to include health promotion messaging in the scripts, including Mack's addiction recovery, Marsha's struggle to quit smoking cigarettes, and an anti-homophobia episode in which Nathan was gay-bashed.

After writer Russell Smith criticized the show's dialogue in a panel discussion on CBC Radio's media analysis show Now the Details, head writer Barry Stevens hired Smith as a dialogue consultant.

Liberty Street was also one of the first Canadian television series ever to have its own dedicated website.

== Episodes ==
=== Season One ===
1. "That Was Then, This Is Now"
2. "Sex, Lies and Pasta Putanesca"
3. "Voyage to the Bottom of the Pit"
4. "Planes, Kids and Automobiles"
5. "Caged Heat"
6. "The Dating Game"
7. "No Ifs, Ands or Butts"
8. "Naked Truth"
9. "Even Bradys Get the Blues"
10. "The Mouse That Roared"
11. "Saturday Night Fever"
12. "All You Need Is Love: Part 1"
13. "All You Need Is Love: Part 2"

=== Season Two ===
1. "Reality Bites Back"
2. "Crimes and Misdemeanours"
3. "For Love and Money"
4. "All Work and No Play"
5. "Return of the Soldier"
6. "Lies I Told My Father"
7. "Friends and Lovers"
8. "Hiring and Firing"
9. "Secret Games"
10. "In the Heat of the Night"
11. "Decisions, Decisions"
12. "Bringing Up Baby"
13. "The Long Goodbye"
