= Reiner Schwarz =

Reiner Schwarz (1948 - August 30, 2014) was a Canadian radio and television personality, who was most noted as a pioneer of the free-form radio format in Canada.

== Early career ==
Originally from Montreal, Quebec, where he worked as a newspaper reporter in his early career, he joined CHUM-FM in 1968 at the time of its transition from its old classical music format to a new progressive rock format. With that station he hosted a freeform show playing eclectic musical selections, interspersed with extended philosophical monologues. He remained with the station until 1972, when a new station manager brought in more tightly formatted playlists, and then returned to Montreal to host a similar show on its rock station CHOM-FM.

== Nightmusic ==
He returned to Toronto in 1974 as host of Nightmusic, a new late-night show on TVOntario which was Canada's first television program devoted to the then-nascent form of music video. The show blended video art, interviews, live performances by musicians and comedians, and what would later be described as "moments of abject surrealism". Dan Aykroyd also once told Schwarz that ideas he had seen on Nightmusic inspired some of his contributions to the development of Saturday Night Live.

He hosted around 300 episodes of Nightmusic before it was cancelled in 1982.

During this era, he also hosted a freeform show on CFNY-FM; on one show Schwarz had conceived as a "salute to spring", he was playing a genre-hopping mix of music ranging from Bruce Cockburn to Claude Debussy, interspersed with nature sounds. Station owner Leslie Allen stormed into the studio to demand that Schwarz play more conventional music, to which Schwarz responded by inviting Allen to go on the air himself; Allen took the mic and offered free tickets to a screening of Saturday Night Fever to the first ten listeners who called in to tell him why they didn't like Schwarz's show — 30 people called in, of whom 29 praised the show and only one complained. Schwarz did one more show the following week, ignoring Allen's directive to follow a conventional playlist, and then quit on the air at the end of his shift.

== Later career ==
After the end of Nightmusic he hosted a Sunday morning freeform show on CHFI-FM, later moving to CKFM-FM.

In 1988 he debuted as host of Connecting, a talk show about youth and teen issues on CHCH-TV.

In 1989, after Maclean-Hunter acquired CFNY from Selkirk Communications, Schwarz was hired as the station's program director, tasked with overseeing the return of its alternative rock format following Selkirk's disastrous attempt to reformat it as a mainstream contemporary hit radio station. He remained with the station until 1992, when he was let go by Maclean-Hunter due to dissatisfaction with the station's ratings.

He also had occasional acting roles, most notably as radio DJ and apartment landlord "Drive Home Dave" in the television series Liberty Street.

== Retirement and return ==
He later retired for a time, until returning to radio in the early 2000s as host of a Friday night jazz show on CJRT-FM.

At the time of his death in 2014, he was hosting Across the Universe, a show blending spoken word and world music, for CIUT-FM.
