= List of Degrassi characters (1987–1992) =

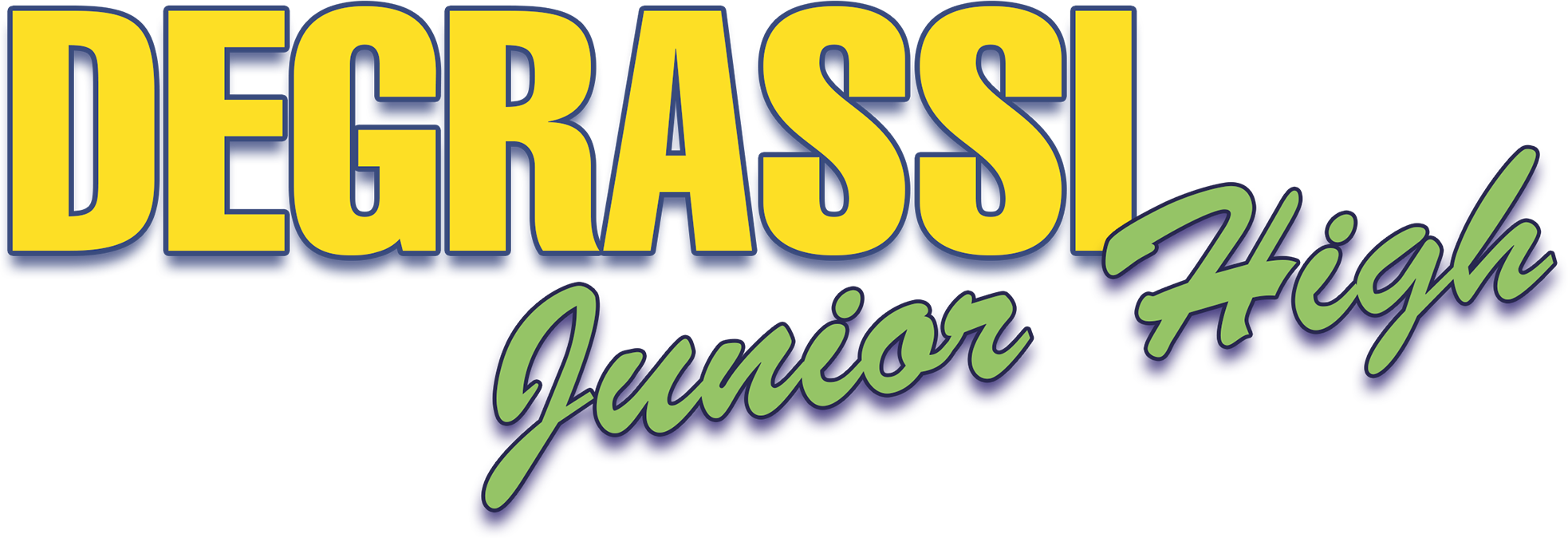
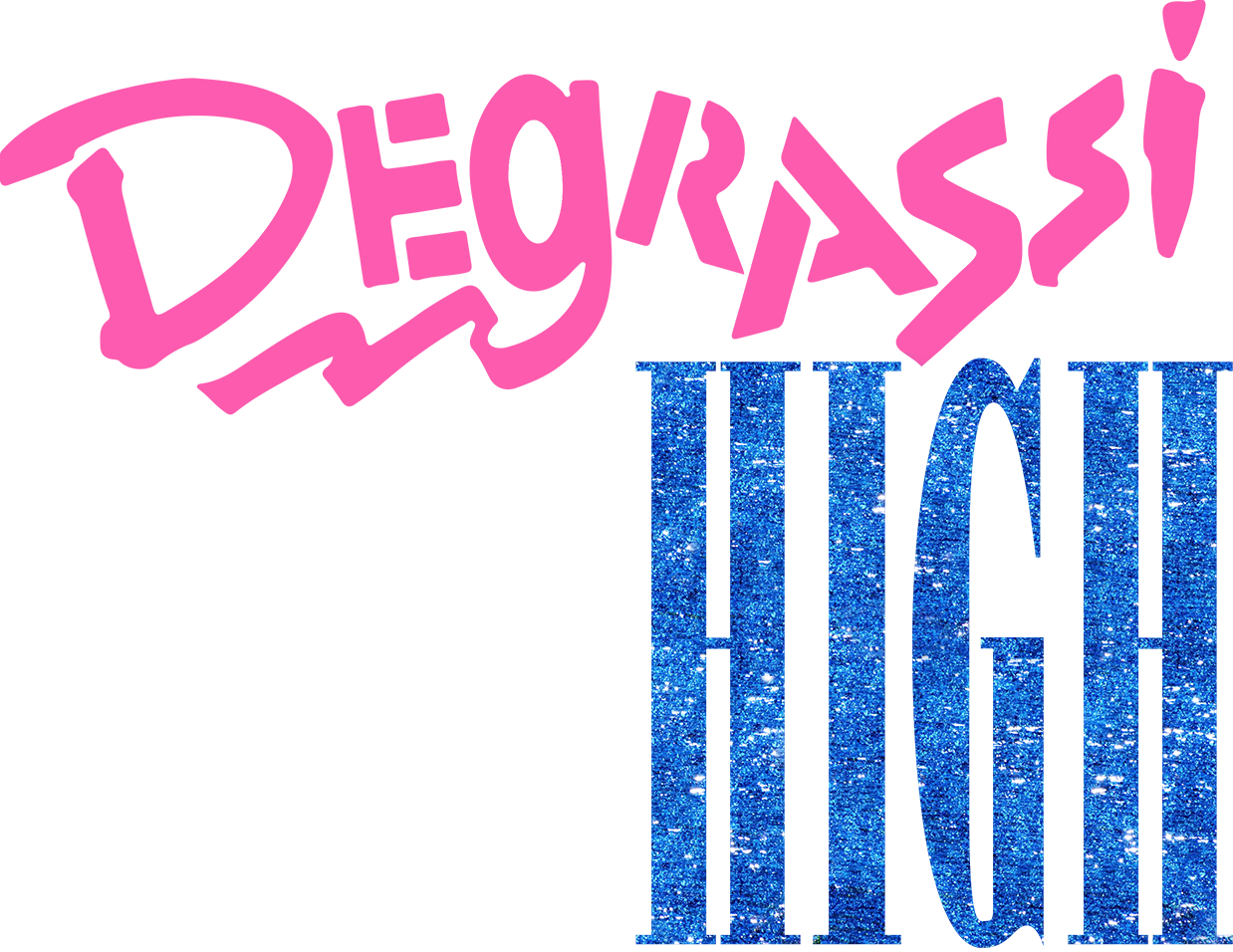

The following is a list of characters from Degrassi Junior High and Degrassi High, the second and third entries of the Degrassi television franchise created by Linda Schuyler and Kit Hood.

Degrassi Junior High aired on the CBC on from 18 January 1987 to 27 February 1989, and centres around an ethnically and economically diverse group of adolescents attending the fictional Degrassi Junior High School in east end Toronto, as they deal with various issues including teenage pregnancy, abuse, and sexuality.

Degrassi High aired on the CBC from 6 November 1989 to 18 February 1991 and follows most of the same characters in high school, as they deal with topics such as abortion, AIDS, and death. This was followed in 1992 by the made-for-television film School's Out, which followed the students post-graduation.

The show followed a rotating "repertory company" model, in which minor characters and extras may have had their roles expanded, and major characters may be relegated to the background on occasion. For example, Christine "Spike" Nelson, a major character in the series whose child, Emma, influenced the development of Degrassi: The Next Generation, began as an extra with no speaking lines.

== Cast timeline ==
Main cast (first billing at least once in the series or otherwise featured prominently)
Supporting cast (repertory cast members in background or with secondary storylines)
Guest star (brief or uncredited appearance)

Actor	Character	Degrassi Junior High			Degrassi High		School's Out!
Actor	Character	1	2	3	4	5	School's Out!
Main characters
Nicole Stoffman	Stephanie Kaye	M	M				
Niki Kemeny	Voula Grivogiannis	M	G				
Pat Mastroianni	Joey Jeremiah	M	M	M	M	M	M
Duncan Waugh	Arthur Kobalewscuy	M	M	M	M	M	
Siluck Saysanasy	Yick Yu	M	M	M	M	M	G
Stefan Brogren	Archie "Snake" Simpson	M	M	M	M	M	M
Sarah Charlesworth	Susie Rivera	M	M				
Neil Hope	Derek "Wheels" Wheeler	M	M	M	M	M	M
Billy Parrott	Shane McKay	M	M	M	G		
Anais Granofsky	Lucy Fernandez	M	M	M	M	M	M
Angela & Maureen Deiseach	Erica & Heather Farrell	M	M	M	M	M	G
Sara Ballingall	Melanie Brodie	M	M	M	M	M	
Rebecca Haines	Kathleen Mead	M	M	M	M	M	(Note: Appears as an uncredited background extra only.)
Craig Driscoll	Rick Munro	M	M				
Stacie Mistysyn	Caitlin Ryan	M	M	M	M	M	M
Amanda Cook	Lorraine "L.D." Delacorte	M	M	M	M		
Amanda Stepto	Christine "Spike" Nelson	M	M	M	M	M	S
Irene Courakos	Alexa Pappadopoulos	S	M	M	M	M	G
Michael Carry	Simon Dexter		M	M	M	M	G
Cathy Keenan	Liz O'Rourke		M	M	M	M	
Darrin Brown	Dwayne Myers		M		S	M	
Dayo Ade	Bryant Lester "B.L.T." Thomas		S	M	M	M	G
Maureen McKay	Michelle Accette		S	M	M	M	
Chrissa Erodotou	Diana Economopoulos		S	S	M	M	
David Armin-Parcells	Claude Tanner				M	M	
John Ioannou	Alex Yankou	S	S	S	S	M	
L. Dean Ifill	Basil "Bronco" Davis				S	M	G
Kirsti Bourne	Tessa Campanelli			S	S	S	M
Supporting characters
Dan Woods	Mr. Daniel Raditch	S	S	S	S	S	
Michelle Goodeve	Ms. Karen Avery	S	S	S	S		
Deborah Lobban	Doris Bell	S	S	S			
Keith White	Tim O'Connor	S	S	S	S	S	G
Tyson Talbot	Jason Cox	S					
Ken Hung	Wai Lee	S	S				
Danah-Jean Brown	Trish Skye	S	S	S		S	
Arlene Lott	Nancy Kramer	S	S	S	S	S	G
Christopher Charlesworth	Scott "Scooter" Webster		S	S	S	S	
Kyra Levy	Maya Goldberg		S	S	S	S	
Trevor Cummings	Bartholomew Bond			S	S	S	
Michael Blake	Paul			S			
Steve Bedernjak	Clutch			S	S	S	
Annabelle Waugh	Dorothy			S	S	S	
Sara Holmes	Allison Hunter			S	S	S	G
Jacy Hunter	Amy Holmes			S	S	S	G
Roger Montgomery	Mr. Garcia			S			
Andy Chambers	Luke Matthews			S	S	S	G
George Chaker	Nick				S	S	G
Michele Johnson-Murray	Tabi				S	S	G
Krista Houston	Joanne Rutherford				S	S	
Adam David	Mr. Jim Walfish				S	S	
Byrd Dickens	Scott Smith				S	S	
Vincent Walsh	Patrick				S	S	
Marsha Ferguson	Cindy					S	

Cast notes

== Students ==
=== Primary characters ===
The following characters receive top billing in at least one episode:

Character name	Portrayed by	Seasons featured
Stephanie Kaye	Nicole Stoffman	1–2
Stephanie Kaye was born as Stephanie Kobalewsky in 1973. After her parents' divorce, she took her mother's maiden name Kaye. Popular, beautiful, but naive, Stephanie was the school president of Degrassi Junior High. She reinvented her image for grade 8 to become more "mature", arriving at school in relatively conservative apparel before changing into something provocative in the school's bathroom. She could be stuck up and selfish, which caused a student revolt in the season one finale Revolution, after she promotes Joey to sports rep just to make Wheels' jealous. Stephanie was one of the most notorious characters in the Degrassi franchise, as well as one of the most controversial. Her sexualized image and apparent disregard for self-respect was a heavy storyline in the show's first two seasons. Later, she became suicidal and battled depression after being rejected by Simon for Alexa, and during her parents' custody battle. In season three, Stephanie was said to have gone to private school in Europe after her mother wins the lottery. In reality, actress Stoffman left the show to star in the sitcom Learning the Ropes with Lyle Alzado.: Stephanie appeared in 22 episodes. She receives top billing in the episodes "Kiss Me Steph" (1.1), "The Big Dance" (1.2), "Best Laid Plans" (1.7), "What a Night" (1.9), "Revolution" (1.13) and "Dog Days" (2.9).; The character is the center of the 2nd Degrassi novelization, Stephanie Kaye, written by Ken Roberts and released in 1988.; Nicole Stoffman was nominated for the Best Performance by a Lead Actress in a Continuing Dramatic Role at the 1987 Gemini Awards for her role as Stephanie Kaye.
Arthur Kobalewsky	Duncan Waugh	1–5
Arthur is Stephanie's younger brother. On his first day at school, he is rejected by his more popular-conscious sister, then trapped in the storage closet by Joey before being rescued by Yick, who becomes his best friend. Arthur is nerdy and socially awkward, with many of his storylines revolving around his struggles to fit in, as well as his sexual awakening, such as an interest in pornography, getting wet dreams and a unrequited crush on Caitlin. His friendship with Yick becomes strained when he comes into wealth after his mother wins the lottery, and later in high school when Yick becomes friends with Luke and falls in with an older, druggier crowd. Although he does not appear, he is mentioned in a deleted scene by Yick in Degrassi: The Next Generation, who shares that they are still friends and have set up a web design company together.: Arthur appeared in 65 episodes. He receives top billing in the episodes "The Experiment" (1.3), "Season's Greetings" (3.4), "Making Whoopee" (3.13) and "Dream On" (4.4).
Rick Munro	Craig Driscoll	1–2
Rick is the school bad boy, who has a criminal record and is repeating Grade 7. When Joey goes to his house to buy a denim jacket, he discovers Rick is being secretly physically abused by his father. After child services get involved, Rick is sent to live with his older brother Frank and appears much happier. He shows a romantic interest in Caitlin, joining her environmental action committee to get close to her, although their relationship never gets off the ground. Later, he helps Kathleen as she struggles with her alcoholic mother. He is never seen or mentioned again after the second season.: Rick appeared in 18 episodes. He receives top billing in the episode "The Cover-Up" (1.4).
Melanie Brodie	Sara Ballingall	1–5
Melanie is an awkward, insecure girl with braces who is eager to grow up. Joey takes advantage of this by selling her "drugs" (that are actually Vitamin C pills), and later embarrasses her at the big swim match between the boys and the girls by making fun of her flat chest. Melanie has a huge crush on Snake, and while he returns her feelings, their attempts to date throughout the series always end in disaster, first when she lies to Yick and is caught out when they all end up at the same movie theater together, and then when she steals $20 from her mother for a Gourmet Scum concert ticket and is grounded. Melanie is best friends with Kathleen, and she tries to support her through her various troubles, such as her alcoholic mother, her eating disorder and her abusive relationship with Scott. However, when she experiments with pot and gets too stoned at Diana's slumber party, she exposes Kathleen's secrets to the rest of the friend group, ending their friendship for good.: Melanie appeared in 56 episodes. She receives top billing in the episodes "The Great Race" (1.5) and "Twenty Bucks" (3.10).; The character is the center of the 5th Degrassi novelization, Melanie, written by Susie Nielsen and released in 1989.
Caitlin Ryan	Stacie Mistysyn	1–5
Main article: Caitlin Ryan (Degrassi) Caitlin is a smart and passionate student, known for her strong opinions on feminism, the environment and animal rights. She is epileptic and has seizures without her medication. Caitlin initially questions her sexual identity when she has dreams about her teacher Ms. Avery, before developing feelings for Rick, and then entering an on-again, off again relationship with Joey. In high school, she dumps Joey for Claude Tanner, a social activist who shares her political views. However, they break up when Caitlin is left to take the fall when they get caught spray painting a nuclear plant. The next year, she becomes estranged from her parents and moves in with her brother Patrick when her father's infidelity is exposed. Later, Claude commits suicide, and Caitlin and Joey reconcile. In School's Out, Caitlin graduates high school early, loses her virginity to Joey and accepts his engagement proposal. However, they break up after she discovers his infidelity (leading to the infamous line, "You were fucking Tessa Campanelli?"). Caitlin goes on to become a world famous journalist and host of Ryan's Planet, returning in a recurring role through the first few seasons of Degrassi: The Next Generation.: Caitlin appeared in 57 episodes. She receives top billing in the episodes "Rumor Has It" (1.6), "Smokescreen" (1.10), "Stage Fright" (2.5), "Censored" (2.10), "The Whole Truth" (3.7), "All in a Good Cause" (4.11), "Stressed Out" (4.15) and "Showtime" (5.11).; The character is the center of the 8th Degrassi novelization, Caitlin, written by Catherine Dunphy and released in 1990.; Stacie Mistysyn hosts the Degrassi Talks special on sexuality.; Stacie Mistysyn reprises her role for 69 episodes of Degrassi: The Next Generation.; Stacie Mistysyn previously appeared as Lisa Canard for 17 episodes of The Kids of Degrassi Street.
Lorraine "L.D." Delacorte	Amanda Cook	1–4
L.D. is the tomboy daughter of a car mechanic, who regularly calls out the sexism of her male classmates. Her mother died of cancer when she was a child, and she has had a fear of hospitals ever since. Later, she becomes best friends with Lucy, and develops a crush on Wheels, although nothing ever really happens between them. In high school, L.D. develops leukemia, eventually going bald and having to wear wigs because of the chemo. She eventually recovers and leaves school to go sailing around the world with her father, with Lucy seen providing her updates via her video camcorder. L.D. did not return for the class reunion in Degrassi: The Next Generation, however the show's alumni guestbook reveals that she goes by "Lor" now and lives in Eugene, Oregon. She works in real estate, while restoring old bikes in her spare time, and currently has a girlfriend.: L.D. appeared in 41 episodes. She receives top billing in the episode "Nothing to Fear" (1.8).
Christine "Spike" Nelson	Amanda Stepto	1–5
Main article: Christine Nelson A punk-rock girl with spiked blonde hair. She is initially a background character in the show's early episodes, before taking the lead role in the episode "It's Late" when she discovers she is pregnant as a result of having unprotected sex with Shane McKay at Lucy's party. The next season chronicles her pregnancy, including her struggles with Shane and his parents, getting kicked out of school when there are complaints from other parents that she is setting a bad example, and her growing friendship with new student and fellow punk-rocker Liz O'Rourke. In the season finale, she goes into labor at the school dance, giving birth to a daughter, Emma, who would later become the protagonist of Degrassi: The Next Generation. When Shane takes acid and jumps off a bridge and can no longer financially support her, Spike tries to get a job at a diner to make ends meet but is discriminated against for her hairstyle. Later, in high school, Spike briefly dates an Irish emigrant and Pogues fan named Patrick, although they have a falling out when he pursues Liz. Spike appears in a supporting role in School's Out, working at a photo shop with Tessa Campanelli and offering her advice on her relationship with Joey. She attends Alexa and Simon's wedding, where she reveals to Caitlin that she is attending university locally while Emma is in pre-kindergarten.: Spike appeared in 62 episodes. She receives top billing in the episodes "It's Late" (1.11) and "Eggbert" (2.1).; The character is the center of the 3rd Degrassi novelization, Spike, written by Loretta Castellarin and Ken Roberts and released in 1988.; Amanda Stepto hosts the Degrassi Talks special on sex.; Amanda Stepto reprises her role for 121 episodes of Degrassi: The Next Generation.
Derek "Wheels" Wheeler	Neil Hope	1–5
Main article: Derek Wheeler Wheels was born Derek Michael Nelson to a pair of teenage parents, but shortly after his birth he is adopted by John and Ellen Wheeler in a closed adoption. He is best friends with Joey and Snake, who together form the garage band The Zit Remedy, later shortened to The Zits in high school. His initial storylines include ill-fated dates with class president Stephanie Kaye, meeting his biological father Mike Nelson, a struggling musician, shortly after his fourteenth birthday, and his poor grades due to being nearsighted and having to wear glasses. After after-school tutoring with Ms. Avery, his grades improve and he is able to pass eighth grade. Things take a tragic turn at the start of season three, when his adopted parents are killed in a car accident caused by a drunk driver. He is then placed in care with his maternal grandparents, but never really recovers from the tragedy and begins to act out. He runs away to see his biological father in Port Hope, Ontario, and is nearly molested by a traveling salesman while hitchhiking. However, Mike is starting a new life with his pregnant fiancé, Maggie, and sends Wheels back to his grandparents. In the final season, his elderly grandparents eventually tire of his lies, disobedience and theft, and evict him. He stays with Joey, until he steals money from Joey's mother's purse and is kicked out. He sleeps on Snake's porch for a night before realising he needs to change and promises to pay Joey's mother back for the money he stole from her. In the made-for-television movie Degrassi: School's Out, Wheels is assumed to have graduated from high school, is working as an auto mechanic, and is preparing for a move to Calgary to be with his girlfriend Karen. He has since become a heavy drinker, and while driving with Lucy under the influence, collides with another car. He temporarily blinds and partially cripples Lucy, and kills a young child in the other car. When Joey visits him in pre-trial confinement, Wheels' inability to accept culpability shocks Joey, and angers and disgusts Snake, who refuses to forgive him. Later, he pleads guilty and is charged with "criminal negligence causing death, criminal negligence causing injury times two, and drunk driving". Wheels is released from prison and appears in the pilot of Degrassi: The Next Generation where he asks Lucy for forgiveness (this scene is shown in the Canadian version on CTV only, not in the American version shown on The N). Two years later, when Snake is battling leukaemia, Joey finally manages to reunite him with Wheels over a game of bowling, with the three, now balder and hopefully wiser, loudly sing "Everybody Wants Something" on the ride home in Joey's convertible.: Wheels appeared in 61 episodes. He receives top billing in the episodes "Parents Night" (1.12), "Can't Live with 'Em" (3.1–3.2), "Taking Off" (3.11–3.12), "A Tangled Web" (5.4) and "Home, Sweet Home" (5.8).; The character is the center of the 9th Degrassi novelization, Wheels, written by Susan Nielsen and released in 1990.; Neil Hope hosts the Degrassi Talks special on alcohol.; Neil Hope reprises his role for 2 episodes of Degrassi: The Next Generation.; Neil Hope previously appeared as Griff for 10 episodes of The Kids of Degrassi Street.; Neil Hope died on November 25, 2007.
Lucy Fernandez	Anais Granofsky	1–5
Lucy is a stylish and wealthy girl, with workaholic parents who are depicted as being always out of town on business trips. As a result, she is lonely and acts out recklessly, including inviting half the class for wild parties at her house, shoplifting from department stores to get attention and ignoring the warning signs when she becomes the target of Mr. Colby, a predatory teacher, who she later reports to the authorities after he goes after Susie. She is the first of her grade to date older boys, including Paul and Clutch, from Borden High School. Later, she is depicted as a budding filmmaker, shooting the music video for The Zit Remedy's "Everybody Wants Something", as well as the feminist horror film "It Creeps!!". She begins dating Bronco, the school president, and by School's Out, has graduated as the class valedictorian. However, tragedy strikes when an intoxicated Wheels gets behind the wheel of a car with Lucy and crashes into another vehicle, killing a child. The accident renders Lucy temporarily blind. Lucy returns for the reunion in Degrassi: The Next Generation, where she is shown as having recovered from her injuries, with her eyesight seemingly restored and able to walk with the use of a cane. She has completed an honours bachelor's degree, a master's degree and is relocating to New Mexico to complete her doctoral dissertation at the University of New Mexico. The next season, she is seen attending Spike and Snake's wedding.: Lucy appeared in 62 episodes. She receives top billing in the episodes "A Helping Hand..." (2.2), "...He's Back" (2.12), "A Big Girl Now" (3.3), "Pa-arty!" (3.15), "It Creeps!!" (4.14) and "Body Politics" (5.5).; The character is the center of the 7th Degrassi novelization, Lucy, written by Nazneen Sadiq and released in 1989.; Anais Granofsky reprises her role for 4 episodes of Degrassi: The Next Generation. In 2020, A.J. Saudin who plays Snake's godson Connor DeLaurier, speculated his character was intended to be the child of Lucy and Bronco, although the identity of his parents were never confirmed onscreen.; Anais Granofsky previously appeared as Karen for 6 episodes of The Kids of Degrassi Street.
Joey Jeremiah	Pat Mastroianni	1–5
Main article: Joey Jeremiah Joey is the class clown, known for his fedora, Hawaiian shirts and antics in class. He is best friends with Snake and Wheels and plays keyboards in the band The Zit Remedy (later known as The Zits). During the show, he struggles with his school work, having to repeat eighth grade, and is later diagnosed with the learning disability dysgraphia. Later seasons revolve around his on-again, off-again relationship with Caitlin Ryan.: Joey appeared in 67 episodes. He receives top billing in the episodes "Great Expectations" (2.3), "Trust Me" (2.11), "Pass Tense" (2.13), "Loves Me, Loves Me Not" (3.5), "Bye-Bye Junior High" (3.16), "Everybody Wants Something" (4.5), "Testing One, Two, Three..." (4.13) and "One Last Dance" (5.13).; The character is the center of the 6th Degrassi novelization, Joey Jeremiah, written by Kathryn Ellis and released in 1989.; Pat Mastroianni hosts the Degrassi Talks special on depression.; Pat Mastroianni reprises his role for 87 episodes of Degrassi: The Next Generation.
Shane McKay	Bill Parrott	1–4
The troubled teenage father of Spike's daughter, Emma. He is the son of an Anglican minister and his wife, who are very conservative and always threatening to send him to a private school. After his baby is born, he tries to be there for Spike, paying half of his allowance as child support, however he is constantly getting rebuffed. Shane eventually falls in with Luke, a bad influence, who convinces him to use this allowance to buy a ticket to the Gourmet Scum concert, where he experiments with LSD. The next day, Shane is found under a bridge and spends the next few weeks in a coma. When he wakes, he is seen attending the school dance using a walker, now developmentally disabled. He returns briefly the next year to pay Spike a visit, where it is revealed that he was now attending a school for special needs kids.: Shane appeared in 38 episodes. He receives top billing in the episode "Dinner & a Show" (2.4).; The character is the center of the 4th Degrassi novelization, Shane, written by Susan Nielsen and released in 1989.; Jonathan Torrens took over the role for 2 episodes of Degrassi: The Next Generation.
Dwayne Myers	Darrin Brown	2, 4–5
A school bully who challenges Joey to a fight, who appears briefly in Junior High with his minions Stu and Meat. He returns in Degrassi High when the students are transferred there after the fire. He serves mainly as one of the show's antagonists, alongside his friends Nick and Tabi, constantly bullying Joey and putting the rest of the student body through a series of humiliating initiation rituals. In "Bad Blood", Dwayne discovers he is HIV-positive after having sex with an infected girl, Penny, over the summer. He reveals his status to Joey after the two get into a brawl, leaving them both bleeding. He bribes Joey to keep quiet by giving him money to buy a new car. The two eventually become friends, and Joey is supportive when Dwayne reveals his status to the rest of the school and becomes an outcast. Dwayne returns for the class reunion in Degrassi: The Next Generation. In a deleted scene, he reveals that he was still AIDS free after 12 years and hoped to be still around in 10 years time.: Dwayne appeared in 16 episodes. He receives top billing in the episodes "Fight!" (2.6) and "Bad Blood" (5.1–5.2).; Darrin Brown reprises his role for 1 episode of Degrassi: The Next Generation.
Kathleen Mead	Rebecca Haines	1–5
Kathleen is Melanie's best friend, who serves as the sour, troubled foil to Caitlin throughout much of the series, often seen competing with her for grades. She is gossipy and judgemental but hides a troubled home life, with an alcoholic mother who humiliates her in front of her school quiz team, and later, becoming obsessed with her weight and developing anorexia nervosa. Kathleen eventually does get counseling, but her problems continue into high school when she begins dating an older boy named Scott Smith, who becomes overly possessive and physically abusive. Kathleen seems to have conservative political and social views, being critical of Ms Avery's potential lesbianism, sex before marriage and animal rights activism. Her sober, uptight presence made her unpopular with many of her peers, however she often showed a rebellious side. In an early episode, she buys "drugs" from Joey (that are actually vitamin pills), and later, after finding marijuana joints hidden in the tampon dispenser in the girls' washroom, takes them to Diana's sleepover party and encourages the girls to smoke them. This backfires when Melanie exposes her dark secrets to the rest of the girls, ending their friendship for good. Kathleen returns for the class reunion in Degrassi: The Next Generation. In a deleted scene, she is depicted as still being jealous of Caitlin's success after high school, and working on her own show to compete with her.: Kathleen appeared in 54 episodes. She receives top billing in the episodes "Bottled Up" (2.7), "Food for Thought" (3.9) and "Nobody's Perfect" (4.6).; Rebecca Haines hosts the Degrassi Talks special on abuse. During the episode, Haines reveals that she herself was a victim of sexual abuse, and talking to one of the teens for the show inspired her to get counseling of her own.; Rebecca Haines reprises her role for 1 episode of Degrassi: The Next Generation.
Erica & Heather Farrell	Angela & Maureen Deiseach	1–5
Twin sisters, who act as confidantes to Stephanie, Spike and Lucy. Erica is the more boy-crazy and outgoing of the two, while Heather is more conservative and prudish. The two occasionally impersonate each other to mixed results, including when they both date Aaron from St. Mary's and have a mono scare, and when they go bowling with Clutch, who ends up more interested in Lucy. In the summer before high school, Erica loses her virginity to Jason, a fellow camp counsellor and gets pregnant. She decides to have an abortion, despite the protests of Heather, who is pro-life and religious. The news later spreads around school, with Liz starting an harassment campaign against Erica over it leading to a physical altercation between the two. Later, Erica shows concern when Heather hooks up with Wheels at a party, worried she'll go too far, and Heather goes through the same struggles when Erica starts dating a new guy, Blaine. Erica and Heather are seen at the graduation party in School's Out, but only Heather attends Simon and Alexa's wedding, with Erica having moved to the Dominican Republic to teach English with her boyfriend Carlos. The twins later return in Degrassi: The Next Generation for Spike's baby shower.: Erica and Heather appear in 65 episodes. They receive top billing in the episodes "Sealed with a Kiss" (2.8), "Star-Crossed" (3.8), "A New Start" (4.1–4.2), "Just Friends" (4.7) and "Natural Attraction" (4.12).; Angela and Maureen Deiseach reprise their roles for 1 episode of Degrassi: The Next Generation.
Archie "Snake" Simpson	Stefan Brogren	1–5
A tall, lanky red-headed student. Originally depicted as a loner, he eventually becomes best friends with Joey and Wheels, together forming the band The Zit Remedy (later known as The Zits). He has an older brother, Glen, a basketball star and valedictorian of his graduating class, who later comes out as gay, something Snake initially struggles with. While several classmates develop feelings for him over the course of the show, Snake is generally unlucky in love and lacking self-confidence. He is initially interested in Melanie, but their relationship fizzles out after a few disastrous dates. In high school, he briefly dates Michelle, not aware that Spike has more of a crush on him. In the summer after graduation, as depicted in School's Out, he works as a lifeguard and becomes increasingly frustrated with his virginity, leading to a falling out with both Joey and Wheels. Months later, he attends Alexa and Simon's wedding with a new girlfriend Pam, who he met at university, and appears considerably more self-assured. Snake returns in Degrassi: The Next Generation as Emma's teacher, eventually marrying Spike and becoming her stepfather and the school's principal. He is the only character to continue his role through all fourteen seasons, as well as four seasons of Degrassi: Next Class.: Snake appeared in 67 episodes. He receives top billing in the episodes "He Ain't Heavy..." (3.6), "Loyalties" (5.3) and "Three's a Crowd" (5.12).; The character is the center of the 10th Degrassi novelization, Snake, written by Susan Nielsen and released in 1991, which establishes Snake as bisexual, who has feelings for both Tamara Hastings and Alonzo Garcia, characters who never appear in the series. A previous novelisation, Stephanie Kaye, gives his full name as "Michael Snakowski", contradicting the events of the series.; Stefan Brogren reprises his role for 325 episodes of Degrassi: The Next Generation and 8 episodes of Degrassi: Next Class, as well as Drake's music video for "I'm Upset".
Michelle Accette	Maureen McKay	2–5
A shy, mousy girl, who is best friends with Alexa. She eventually comes out of her shell and enters a relationship with B.L.T., despite her parents' disapproval because of his race. In high school, her mother leaves her father after cheating on him, and Michelle sides with him in the divorce. He becomes too overbearing and strict, so after turning sixteen, Michelle decides to move out into an apartment of her own, getting a job at Donut Express to pay the rent. When it starts having an impact on her school work, her father offers to help pay with the rent if she would cut back on work shifts. Later, she gets addicted to caffeine pills, breaks up with B.LT. after he cheats on her with Cindy, starts dating Snake and moves back home after struggling to balance her work hours with school and paying rent. Michelle did not return for the class reunion in Degrassi: The Next Generation, however the show's alumni guestbook reveals that she moved to Montreal to work at a record store, became a singer, then went to college and became a social worker.: Michelle appeared in 57 episodes. She receives top billing in the episodes "Black & White" (3.14), "Breaking Up is Hard to Do" (4.3) and "Sixteen" (4.9–4.10).; Maureen McKay appears as a background extra throughout the first season.
Diana Economopoulos	Chrissa Erodotou	2–5
Originally a background character, Diana is a boy-crazy Greek-American girl, who becomes more prominent in the show's high school years, as a close friend of Melanie, Kathleen and Caitlin. She gets her own episode in "Little White Lies", which reveals her home life under her strict older brother George, who has been raising her since her father died 12 years prior. She gets in trouble for smoking cigarettes, skipping class with Yick and Luke, and drinking at Melanie's party, but eventually her and her brother come to an understanding. Diana returns for the class reunion in Degrassi: The Next Generation, in a deleted scene, she reveals she is now married to a man called Dan Pratt, has two children and is working towards her accounting certification.: Diana appeared in 44 episodes. She receives top billing in the episode "Little White Lies" (4.8).
Liz O'Rourke	Cathy Keenan	2–5
A new student with a distinctive skinhead aesthetic, who becomes Spike's best friend. She is initially pursued romantically by Joey, but they have a falling out when he assumes she'll put out because of her looks. Liz is a radical animal rights activist and also strongly pro-life, putting her odds at different times with Caitlin and Erica over her methods. Later, she develops feelings for Patrick and then Tim, which triggers disturbing memories of being molested by her mother's boyfriend as a child. Liz returns for the class reunion in Degrassi: The Next Generation, in a deleted scene, she reveals she works with the developmentally disabled. She makes appearances in later seasons as a mid-wife helping Spike give birth to her second child, Jack, and supporting her in her brief separation from Snake.: Liz appeared in 49 episodes. She receives top billing in the episode "Crossed Wires" (5.6).; Cathy Keenan reprises her role for 4 episodes of Degrassi: The Next Generation.; Cathy Keenan appears as a background extra throughout the first season (presumably playing a different character, as Liz is presented as being new to the school when she is introduced).
Alex Yankou	John Ioannou	1–5
Originally a background character, Alex is the school's biggest nerd, who becomes more prominent in the show's high school years, when he develops feelings for Tessa Campanelli. The two have a rocky start together, when he takes the physical side of their relationship too slowly for her liking, and she eventually leaves him after 3 months for his friend, Yick. Alex did not return for the class reunion in Degrassi: The Next Generation, however the show's alumni guestbook reveals that he is now an architect who designs bridges.: Alex appeared in 57 episodes. He receives top billing in the episode "The All Nighter" (5.7).
Basil "Bronco" Davis	L. Dean Ifill	4–5
The class president, who eventually starts dating Lucy after helping her with the girls' volleyball team. When the band the Savages decide to film their music video at Degrassi, he is the only one to know, but lets it slip to Lucy. She decides to crash it with Erica, Heather, Snake and Joey, getting him in trouble with Raditch. Bronco and Lucy are still dating by School's Out and he is last seen by her hospital bed after the horrific car crash that left her blind.: Bronco appeared in 23 episodes. He receives top billing in the episode "Extracurricular Activities" (5.9).
Claude Tanner	David Armin-Parcells	4–5
A sensitive, goth student and social activist, who becomes Caitlin's boyfriend when she leaves Joey. They break up after they vandalize a nuclear plant together, and he leaves her stranded on a barb wire fence where she is caught by police. After he refuses to go with her to her court date, she punches him, causing him to bleed. The next year, he continues to pursue Caitlin but is rejected. This, along with his difficult relationship with his father and struggles with his parents' divorce, causes him to have a mental breakdown. He brings a gun into the boys' bathroom at Degrassi and commits suicide, where his body is found by Snake.: Claude appeared in 21 episodes. He receives top billing in the episode "Showtime" (5.10).

=== Secondary characters ===
The following characters feature prominently throughout the show, although never receive top billing:

Character name	Portrayed by	Seasons featured
Voula Grivogiannis	Niki Kemeny	1
Voula is best friends with Stephanie, and in the first episode, offers to help her run for school president. However, the two have a falling out over Stephanie's provocative antics (including offering to kiss any boy who would vote for her). Voula comes from a conservative Greek family, and is constantly getting in trouble with her father, for sneaking out to the school dance, then being caught shoplifting with Lucy. Later, she leaves Degrassi when her family moves out to the suburbs.: Voula appeared in 10 episodes. She made a voice only appearance in season two, leaving a message on Lucy's answering machine. Her highest billing in the credits is 2nd, in the episodes "Kiss Me Steph" (1.1), "The Big Dance" (1.2) and "Nothing to Fear" (1.8).
Yick Yu	Siluck Saysanasy	1–5
Arthur's best friend, who is a Laotian refugee who fled with his family to Canada by boat. Like Arthur, he is initially nerdy and socially awkward, with an unrequited crush on Melanie. However, by high school, he has grown up, gotten an earring and fallen in with a cooler crowd, hanging out with Luke and skipping class to smoke cigarettes. He admits to a crush on Maya, but ends up with Tessa Campanelli, after she dumps Alex for him. They break up over the summer and he is seen at a party in School's Out smoking a joint. Yick returns for the class reunion in Degrassi: The Next Generation (in a deleted scene, he reveals to have set up a web design company with Arthur) and makes a cameo at Spike's birthday party a season later (Saysanasy worked on the show as a trainee assistant director from 2002–2004).: Yick appeared in 65 episodes. His highest billing in the credits is 2nd, in the episodes "The Experiment" (1.3) and "Season's Greetings" (3.4).; Siluck Saysanasy hosts the Degrassi Talks special on drugs.; Siluck Saysanasy reprises his role for 2 episodes of Degrassi: The Next Generation.
Susie Rivera	Sarah Charlesworth	1–2
Caitlin's best friend, who is elected Student Council Vice President and works on the class yearbook. Her friendship with Caitlin is occasionally strained, such as when Kathleen spreads rumors that Caitlin is a lesbian, and when Caitlin suffers an epileptic fit at her sleepover. Later, she becomes a sexual fixation for Mr. Colby, the predatory substitute teacher, who makes a pass at her after class. She initially is hesitant to report him, however Lucy convinces her when she suggests her younger sister, Norah-Jean, could become a future victim. She is never seen or mentioned again after the second season.: Susie appeared in 21 episodes. Her highest billing in the credits is 2nd, in the episodes "Rumor Has It" (1.6), "Smokescreen" (1.10) and "He's Back" (2.12).; Sarah Charlesworth previously appeared as Casey Rothfels for 15 episodes of The Kids of Degrassi Street.
Tim O'Connor	Keith White	1–5
An overachieving black student and writer for the Degrassi Digest, generally seen in tie-dye shirts with Nancy in the background of most episodes. In his first appearance, he appears to be a replacement for Hank as Joey's partner-in-crime, who he confides in about Rick getting abused by his dad. Later appearances depict him as brainiac (representing the school on the educational game show Quest for the Best) and as a voice of reason (trying to discourage Shane from taking acid at the Gourmet Scum concert). In high school, he performs magic as "Tim the Terrific" for the school's talent shows, with Bartholomew Bond as his assistant. His most notable storyline is when he asks Liz out to a Pogues concert. His attempt to kiss her goodnight triggers repressed memories of sexual abuse, and she runs away screaming. The two later reconcile and are seen dancing together at the last school dance.: Tim appeared in 39 episodes. His highest billing in the credits is 3rd, in the episodes "The Cover-Up" (1.4), "It Creeps!!" (4.14) and "Crossed Wires" (5.6).; Keith White wrote and performs the theme song for Degrassi Talks (with Stacie Mistysyn).
Alexa Pappadopoulos	Irene Courakos	1–5
Stephanie's friend and later rival, for the affections of new student Simon. She is Greek-Canadian and initially a background character in the first season. In season two, while trying to shed her bad girl image, Stephanie gives all her clothes to Alexa. When Simon begins ignoring her, Stephanie regrets it and tries to get them back but Alexa refuses. Alexa is eventually forced to return the clothes after her mother discovers them, but Simon still chooses to go out with her instead. The friendships between Alexa, her best friend Michelle, Simon, and his best friend B.L.T, are tested when Alexa gets bored with Simon and decides to pursue B.L.T instead. Eventually, Alexa regrets breaking up with Simon and the two get back together. Alexa and Simon then become the comic relief of the show, with their side-plots acting as a lighter contrast to the more serious main-plots (such as Alexa having body image issues while Kathleen is battling anorexia). In School's Out, Alexa and Simon are shown getting married, and they return for the class reunion in Degrassi: The Next Generation, where Alexa confirms she and Simon are expecting their third child.: Alexa appeared in 60 episodes. Her highest billing in the credits is 3rd, in the episodes "Sealed with a Kiss" (2.8) and "Sixteen" (4.9–4.10).; Irene Courakos reprises her role for 1 episode of Degrassi: The Next Generation.
Trish Skye	Danah-Jean Brown	1–5
A red-headed girl involved in the school's newspaper, yearbook and Environmental Action Committee. She is generally seen in the background of most episodes, mostly interacting with Caitlin, Susie, Kathleen and Melanie. Later, she quits the Degrassi Digest after Caitlin organises a protest against Laura V, a cosmetic company Trish's father works for. In high school, she reinvents herself as a punk rocker, with a dramatic spiked mohawk. She is seen hanging out mostly with Joanne, while attending Mrs. Perry's special education class (her grades presumably fallen due to an unknown learning disability). Trish returns in School's Out where she is seen attending Alexa and Simon's wedding and is dressed more conservatively, and for the class reunion in Degrassi: The Next Generation. A deleted scene reveals she is now a freelance writer and an alcoholic who has been clean and sober for 2 years.: Trish appeared in 46 episodes. Her highest billing in the credits is 3rd, in the episode "The Whole Truth" (3.7).; Danah-Jean Brown previously appeared as Connie Jacobs for 9 episodes of The Kids of Degrassi Street.; Danah-Jean Brown reprises her role for 1 episode of Degrassi: The Next Generation.
Nancy Kramer	Arlene Lott	1–5
The overweight editor of the Degrassi Digest, generally seen with Tim in the background of most episodes. She is depicted as a studious and responsible over-achiever with high grades, always involved in various extra-circular activities, including the Quest for the Best quiz competition. She served as class president in her third year at Degrassi Junior High, beating Kathleen, and as vice-president in her second year at Degrassi High under Bronco.: Nancy appeared in 66 episodes. Her highest billing in the credits is 4th, in the episode "Bottled Up" (2.7).; Arlene Lott previously appeared as Rachel Hewitt for 7 episodes of The Kids of Degrassi Street.
Simon Dexter	Michael Carry	2–5
A new student from New York, who works as a part-time model and is famous around school for appearing in advertisements. He is depicted as sweet, naive and a bit of a himbo, who gets the attention of both Stephanie and Alexa. He chooses Alexa, and their on-again, off-again relationship serves as the show's comic relief. In high school, he plays a jock in Lucy's feminist slasher film It Creeps!! and joins the school's football and basketball teams.: Simon appeared in 48 episodes. His highest billing in the credits is 3rd, in the episode "Loves Me, Loves Me Not" (3.5).; Michael Carry reprises his role for 1 episode of Degrassi: The Next Generation.
Scott "Scooter" Webster	Christopher Charlesworth	2–5
A younger student transferred to Degrassi from Simcoe Elementary as part of an advanced placement program. He is a stereotypical nerd interested in Dungeons & Dragons, comic books and computer games, and is bullied by his peers due to his small stature. In season two, he is generally seen with Max, another advanced placement student. After being called nerds by Arthur and Yick, they try to emulate Rick and experiment with smoking cigarettes in the boys' bathroom. In season three, he befriends Bartholomew Bond. Together they try to grow sea monkeys in the library's fish tank. In the season finale, him and Tessa are playing tag in the school halls when they discover a fire in the boiler room. Later in high school, Tessa and Scooter go to a school dance together but their relationship doesn't go anywhere, and Scooter and Bart spend the rest of the series as background characters.: Scooter appeared in 38 episodes. His highest billing in the credits is 5th, in the episode "Black & White" (3.14).; Christopher Charlesworth previously appeared as Benjamin Martin for 5 episodes of The Kids of Degrassi Street. He is the brother of Sarah Charlesworth, who plays Susie.
Bryant Lester "B.L.T." Thomas	Dayo Ade	2–5
A school jock and Simon's best friend. He is Nigerian-Canadian. He briefly dates Alexa, before entering a relationship with Michelle. Michelle's parents do not approve of their relationship because of his race, and he also experiences racism when a Borden High student calls him a racial slur. They continue dating despite this, until later in high school when B.L.T. falls for Cindy, captain of the girls' volleyball team. When Michelle overhears Cindy describing her as "crying like Niagara Falls", she pours milk all over him in the cafeteria, ending their relationship. BLT did not return for the class reunion in Degrassi: The Next Generation, however the show's alumni guestbook reveals that he is teaching basketball in France.: B.L.T. appeared in 48 episodes. His highest billing in the credits is 2nd, in the episodes "Black & White" (3.14), "Breaking Up is Hard to Do" (4.3) and "Sixteen" (4.9–4.10).; The character is the center of the 12th and final Degrassi novelization, BLT, written by Catherine Dunphy and released in 1992.
Maya Goldberg	Kyra Levy	2–5
A student born with spina bifida, who uses a wheelchair. In the show's Christmas episode, she reveals she is Jewish and celebrates Hanukkah. She replaces Susie as Caitlin's best friend and confidante, and offers her advice on her relationship struggles with Claude and Joey. She is also friends with Diana, Melanie and Kathleen, although their friendship group becomes strained when they begin not inviting Maya to events, worried about wheelchair accessibility. She tells them off and they eventually make up. At Diana's 16th birthday sleepover, she reveals she has a crush on Yick and later experiments with smoking pot. Maya returns for the class reunion in Degrassi: The Next Generation. On the show's alumni guestbook, she reveals she is a singer in a band and working at a radio station, and has married a doctor.: Maya appeared in 44 episodes. Her highest billing in the credits is 2nd, in the episode "Stressed Out" (4.15).; The character is the center of the 11th Degrassi novelization, Maya, written by Kathryn Ellis and released in 1992.; Kyra Levy reprises her role for 1 episode of Degrassi: The Next Generation.
Bartholomew Bond	Trevor Cummings	3–5
A short, nerdy 7th grade student with curly blonde hair, who is bullied by Arthur and Yick on his first day at school (in retribution of how they were treated the year before). He is also mocked by Raditch when he accidentally goes to the wrong classroom. He becomes best friends with Scooter, bonding over their interest in superhero comics. In high school (it is never made clear if him, Dorothy and Tessa skip ahead a grade or if its an intentional retcon), he and Scooter appear mostly as background characters with little to no dialogue.: Bart appeared in 15 episodes. His highest billing in the credits is 6th, in the episode "Black & White" (3.14).
Paul	Michael Blake	3
A student at Borden High who briefly dates Lucy. They break up when he tries to pressure her into having sex at a party. Later, he becomes jealous when Lucy begins dating his best friend, Clutch, who is struggling with alcoholism.: Paul appeared in 6 episodes. His highest billing in the credits is 3rd, in the episode "Pa-arty!" (3.15).
Clutch	Steve Bedernjak	3–5
A rebellious, older student at Borden High, who drives a car splattered with neon paint. He is a bad influence on his best friend Paul, encouraging him and Lucy to throw a party. When they break up, he pursues Lucy for himself, but they break up over his drinking problem. Later he is expelled and transferred to Degrassi High. He briefly gets back together with Lucy, before becoming more of a background character.: Clutch appeared in 27 episodes. His highest billing in the credits is 2nd, in the episode "Pa-arty!" (3.15).
Dorothy	Annabelle Waugh	3–5
Arthur's cousin, who he treats as an embarrassment (similar to how his sister Stephanie did the year prior). She is constantly interjecting herself in her cousin's life, such as mending his friendship with Yick when they have a fight over his newfound wealth. Later, she appears as Tessa's best friend and confidante, giving her advice on her relationship issues with Alex.: Dorothy appeared in 19 episodes. His highest billing in the credits is 3rd, in the episode "Season's Greetings" (3.4).; Annabelle Waugh is the younger sister of Duncan Waugh (who plays Arthur).
Allison Hunter & Amy Holmes	Sara Holmes & Jacy Hunter	3–5
Inseparable blonde best friends and cheerleaders. Both are portrayed as catty, stuck-up and obsessed with boys, seen in the background of most episodes or rejecting Joey's advances. Allison has a crush on Snake, and in one episode, tries to steal him away from Melanie, before Kathleen intervenes. In another episode, Allison and Amy have a falling out when Snake asks Amy to the dance, and later embarrass themselves in the bathroom when trying to return each other's borrowed clothes. In School's Out, Allison is saved by Snake when she gets drunk and almost drowns in a lake at Bronco's party. Allison returns alone for the class reunion in Degrassi: The Next Generation. She serves as one of the episode's antagonists, seducing Caitlin's fiancé Keith and getting him to admit that he has doubts about the marriage. In a deleted scene, she says she is a waitress and aspiring actress with dreams of making it in Hollywood, but has so far only appeared in an incontinence diaper commercial.: Allison appeared in 34 episodes, while Amy appeared in 37 episodes. Their highest billing in the credits is 8th and 9th respectively, in the episode "Making Whoopee" (3.13).; Sara Holmes reprises her role for 1 episode of Degrassi: The Next Generation.; Jacy Hunter's backside in jeans is used as the backdrop of the show's title card in every episode of Degrassi High.
Luke Matthews	Andy Chambers	3–5
A drug-using student, and bad influence on Shane and later Yick. He initially appears as a background character in season two, before befriending Shane in season three, encouraging him to skip out on Spike's child support to buy a ticket to the Gourmet Scum concert. At the concert, he offers Shane acid, who takes it and ends up falling off a bridge and getting permanent brain damage. In high school, he becomes friends with Yick, encouraging him to skip class to smoke cigarettes. He eventually clashes with Yick's nerdy best friend Arthur, although Arthur later earns his respect when he beats him in poker.: Luke appeared in 47 episodes. His highest billing in the credits is 5th, in the episode "All in a Good Cause" (4.11).; Some promotional materials list the character as "Luke Cassellis", despite being referred to as "Luke Matthews" onscreen.
Tessa Campanelli	Kristen Bourne	3–5
A blonde, younger student, often seen running around in the background with Dorothy, Scooter and Bart. In the finale of Degrassi Junior High, she and Scooter discover the fire in the school's boiler room while playing tag. In high school, she initially develops a crush on Scooter, although their relationship doesn't go anywhere. Later, she begins dating Alex, although she quickly becomes frustrated by his apparent lack of interest in her sexually, and eventually leaves him for Yick. Tessa is a main character in School's Out, having grown up into a promiscuous young woman, who works at a photo lab with Spike during the day, and dresses provocatively to attract boys. After breaking up with Yick over the summer, she is dating Todd, but she dumps him at a party when he is too busy getting stoned to pay attention to her. She ends up getting a ride home from Joey, and the two begin an affair behind his girlfriend Caitlin's back. She ends up getting pregnant and is last seen in the waiting room at an abortion clinic. Tessa did not return for the class reunion in Degrassi: The Next Generation, however the show's alumni guestbook reveals that she is working as a nurse and still holds a torch for Joey.: Tessa appeared in 33 episodes. Her highest billing in the credits is 3rd, in the episode "Three's a Crowd" (5.12).
Nick & Tabi	George Chaker & Michele Johnson-Murray	4–5
School bullies, who serve as Dwayne's underlings throughout high school. In the first episode of Degrassi High, the three carry out the hazing of the recently transferred students. While at some point Nick goes to a school dance with Allison, he and Tabi are later shown to be a couple. They attend Mrs. Perry's Special Education class, where they constantly bully Joey. When Dwayne is exposed as being HIV positive, Nick severs all ties with him, however at the school dance, Tabi attempts to reconcile with Dwayne by asking him to dance. Both Nick and Tabi are seen attending Alexa and Simon's wedding in School's Out.: Nick and Tabi appeared in 23 episodes. Their highest billing in the credits is 8th and 9th respectively, in the episodes "Bad Blood" (5.1–5.2).
Joanne Rutherford	Krista Houston	4–5
Originally a background character, Joanne becomes more prominent on the show in season five, seen often with Trish in Mrs. Perry's Special Education class. An opinionated daughter of a nurse, she spends most of her time lecturing the rest of the class on misconceptions surrounding HIV and AIDS. Later, it is revealed that she and Claude were friends, and after he commits suicide, she becomes his most vocal supporter, making an emotional speech at the school's talent show on behalf on his parents. At the school dance, she is the most welcoming to Dwayne, after he is exposed as having HIV and becomes a school pariah.: Joanne appeared in 27 episodes. Her highest billing in the credits is 4th, in the episodes "Showtime" (5.10–5.11).
Scott Smith	Byrd Dickens	4–5
A school jock who becomes Kathleen's boyfriend. He eventually reveals a jealous, violent streak when she begins spending time with Luke for school assignment. Kathleen breaks up with him after he begins beating her, but he is still pursues her until the police are called. While he is never charged, Scott leaves Kathleen alone from that point on, and he is seen as a background character for the rest of the show's run. At Diana's birthday party sleepover, Kathleen reveals that the two smoked marijuana together.: Scott appeared in 26 episodes. His highest billing in the credits is 2nd, in the episode "Nobody's Perfect" (4.6).
Patrick	Vincent Walsh	4–5
A student who has recently emigrated from Ireland. He is a fan of The Pogues and briefly dates Spike, writing a song for her on his guitar called "Christine". After their relationship fizzles out, he pursues her best friend Liz, sparking a conflict between the two.: Patrick appeared in 13 episodes. His highest billing in the credits is 7th, in the episode "Nobody's Perfect" (4.6).

=== Minor supporting roles ===
- Hank (Billie Mintz, season 1), Joey's partner-in-crime, bullies Arthur on his first day at school
- Annie (Ximena Bensusan, season 1), background student
- Avrianna (Jenny Lass, season 1), background student in a wheelchair
- Vicky Friedland (Karryn Sheridan, seasons 1–5), background student
- Vivian Wong (Colleen Lam, seasons 1–4), background student
- Jyoti (Sabrina Dias, seasons 1–4), background student, attends Susie's sleepover where Caitlin has a seizure
- Mahmoud "Mack" Sama (Samer Kamal, seasons 1–4), background student, friends with Arthur and Alex
- Mark (Andy Jekabsons, seasons 1–5), background student, footballer who later dates Amy
- Jason Cox (Tyson Talbot, season 1), the school's sports representative and captain of the boys' soccer team
- Wai Lee (Kei Kei Hung, seasons 1–2), chosen for the swim race against the girls' team, along with Jason and Wheels
- Joy Saint-Jean (Lisa Williams, seasons 1–5), background student, reprises her role in Degrassi: The Next Generation
- Max (Joshua Whitehead, season 2), grade 6 advanced placement student, Scooter's friend
- Meat & Stu (Raffi Malkassian & Kevin Marshall, season 2), Dwayne's friends, school bullies
- Nicole (Stephanie Samuels, season 3), background Borden High student, friends with Clutch and Paul
- Glen (Marc Betsworth, season 3), background Borden High student, friends with Clutch and Paul, later deals drugs to Shane
- Mick (Wayne Reid, season 3), background Borden High student
- Dave (Adam Silver, season 3), background Borden High student, later calls BLT a racial slur
- Faith (Astra Crosby, season 3), goth Borden High student, who tells Erica what Clutch's astrological sign is
- Rainbow (Anna Keenan, seasons 3–5), background student, reprises her role in Degrassi: The Next Generation
- Ricky (Danny Ciraco, seasons 3–5), background student, friends with Alex, reprises his role in Degrassi: The Next Generation
- David (Carl Langschmidt, seasons 3, 5), background student
- Michi Noguchi (Nokkeo Vong, seasons 3–4), background student, friends with Dorothy
- Lily (Ysu Luu, season 3), background student, friends with Dorothy and Tessa
- Casey (Andrew Lockie, seasons 3–5), background student, friends with Alex
- Trudi Owens (Tammy Campbell, seasons 3–5), background student with red streaked hair, friends with Caitlin and Susie
- Lois (Carina Annis, season 4), background student, friends with Tabi
- Grace (Niville Diggs, seasons 4–5), background student, friends with Tabi
- Ralph (Henry Hwang, seasons 4–5), background student, friends with Snake and Tim
- Sylvia (Aimee Darcel, seasons 4–5), background student, friends with Claude
- T.J. (Charles Bonsu, seasons 4), background student, friends with BLT
- Cindy (Marsha Ferguson, season 5), captain of the girls' volleyball team who BLT leaves Michelle for
- Sprinka (Rahnuma Panthaky, season 5), Cindy's friend
- Dale (Cameron Graham, season 5), sexist jock who is interested in Lucy but clashes with her over use of the basketball court
- Todd (Christian Campbell, season 5), Dale's friend, dates Tessa in School's Out

== Adults ==
Character name	Portrayed by	Seasons featured
Daniel "Dan" Raditch	Dan Woods	1–5
Mr. Raditch is the English teacher in Degrassi Junior High and the assistant principal in the Degrassi High series. He is portrayed as stern and overly disciplinary, regularly clashing with Joey over his antics in class.: Raditch appeared in 55 episodes, including voice only appearances. His highest billing in the credits is 7th, in the episode "Trust Me" (2.11).; Dan Woods reprises his role for the first four seasons of Degrassi: The Next Generation as the school's principal, before being fired for his handling of the school shooting. It is here that his forename, Daniel, is finally revealed.
Karen Avery	Michelle Goodeve	1–4
Ms. Avery is the Geography and Social Studies teacher in Degrassi Junior High and the school librarian in the Degrassi High series. One episode revolves around rumours by students that she is a lesbian, which she neither confirms or outright denies. She implies to Spike during an argument that she cannot conceive children. Later, she leaves the school when she is offered work as a substitute teacher instead of a full-time class.: Avery appeared in 34 episodes. Her highest billing in the credits is 9th, in the episode "Smokescreen" (1.10).
Doris Bell	Deborah Lobban	1–3
Doris is the school secretary in Degrassi Junior High for the school's principal, Mr Lawrence, who is unseen and only heard over the school's PA system (voiced by director and Kids of Degrassi Street writer John Bertram for 13 episodes). She is portrayed as a gossip, who involves herself in her students' lives, including reporting Joey's bruises to child services, and blabbing about the expansion of the school's grade 9 class. She is not seen again after the school burns down and the students are transferred elsewhere.: Doris appeared in 19 episodes. Her highest billing in the credits is 10th, in the episodes "Smokescreen" (1.10) and "Sealed with a Kiss" (2.8).
Louella Hawkins	Susin Nielsen	2–3
Louella is the school janitor and custodian in Degrassi Junior High. According to the actress, she died when the high school burnt down in the fire.: Louella appeared in 4 episodes. Her highest billing in the credits is 13th, in the episode "Dog Days" (2.9).; Susin Nielsen is one of the show's writers.
Mr. Garcia	Roger Montgomery	3
Mr. Garcia is the grade 9 Math teacher in Degrassi Junior High. During his time on the show, he taught the students about the AIDS virus and took Wheels' under his wing after his parents' death.: Garcia appeared in 13 episodes. His highest billing in the credits is 15th, in the episode "Making Whoopee" (3.13).
Jim Walfish	Adam David	4–5
Mr. Walfish is the English and Literature teacher in Degrassi High. During his time of the show, he broke up a fight between Erica and Liz over abortion, helped Joey with his dysgraphia and encouraged Lucy's filmmaking career.: Walfish appeared in 15 episodes. His highest billing in the credits is 10th, in the episode "A Tangled Web" (5.4).
Mr. Webster	John Weir	4–5
Mr. Webster is the Science teacher in Degrassi High. He has a strong Scottish accent, and is referred to derisively as "Webfoot" by Joey. In one episode, the students discover he has used the same science test repeatedly over the years and use it to cheat. It backfires when he decides the test is too easy, and he instead updates the test to make it harder.: Webster appeared in 6 episodes. His highest billing in the credits is 13th, in the episode "Extracurricular Activities" (5.9).
Mrs. Perry	Florence Darnell	5
Mrs. Perry is the Special Education teacher in Degrassi High, who teaches a class for students with learning and reading disabilities, including Joey, Dwayne, Nick, Tabi, Trish, Joanne and Ralph. She has a tutorial assistant named Carmelita (played by Angela Moore for 1 episode). She also taught HIV and AIDS awareness, which included speakers living with the virus taking questions, and later announced the suicide of Claude Tanner to the class.: Perry appeared in 4 episodes. Her highest billing in the credits is 24th, in the episode "One Last Dance" (5.13).

=== Minor supporting roles ===
- Voula's parents (Paul Brock & Nancy Beltrame, season 1)
- Rick's dad (Sid Bruyn, season 1), who beats him
- Joey's mom (Gretchen Helbig, seasons 1–5)
- Joey's dad (George King, season 1)
- Swim coach (Evannah Sakamoto, season 1), coaches the girls swimming team at Degrassi Junior High
- Stephanie & Arthur's mom (Pat Beaven, seasons 1–2), a pharmacist
- Frank Delacorte (Kenneth Taylor, season 1, 4), L.D.'s dad, a mechanic
- Spike's mom (Rhonda Kristi, seasons 1–3), who owns a hairdressing salon
- Helen & John Wheeler (Nancy Sinclair & Tim Zemanek, seasons 1–3), Wheels' adopted parents, who die in a car accident
- Mike Nelson (Dave James, seasons 1, 3), Wheels' birth father, a drummer
- Steven & Mary McKay (Peter Brierley & Jane Carnwath, seasons 2–3), Shane's parents, a minister and his wife
- Mr. Colby (Marcus Bruce, season 2), substitute teacher and predator, who inappropriately touches Lucy, and later Susie
- Liz's mom (Laine Williams, season 2), a waitress
- Caitlin's mom (Dona Hird, seasons 2, 4–5), vice-principal of another school
- Caitlin's dad (Steve Behal, season 2, Martin Brown, season 5), teacher who cheats on his wife
- Kathleen's mother (Sheila Brogren, seasons 2–3), an alcoholic
- Snake's parents (Vivian Palin & Clarke Mackey, season 2, Maggie Thomas & Ingvar Brogren, seasons 3, 5)
- Wheels' grandparents (Dorothy Phillips & Rod Rekofski, seasons 3–5), who take care of Wheels' after his adopted parents are killed
- Kathleen's father (Ross Churchill, season 3)
- Melanie's mom (Vanessa Dylyn, season 3)
- Stephanie & Arthur's dad (James Johnston, season 3)
- Michelle's mom (Rose Ann Newlove, seasons 3–4)
- Michelle's dad (Frank Quinlan, season 3, Richard Kovsky, season 4–5)
- Diana's mom (Angela Demos, season 4)
- BLT's dad (Ronald Williams, season 4)
- Gym coach (Tom Cranston, season 5), teaches physical education at Degrassi High
- Geography teacher (Gwen Tolbert, season 5)

== Cast appearances ==
The Degrassi franchise includes its predecessor, The Kids of Degrassi Street, and its spin-offs Degrassi Junior High, Degrassi High, School's Out! Degrassi Talks, Degrassi: The Next Generation and Degrassi: Next Class. Several Degrassi Junior High and Degrassi High cast members have appeared on multiple shows.

Main cast (first or second billing at least once in the series)
Supporting cast (repertory cast members in background or with secondary storylines)
Guest star (brief or uncredited appearance)

Cast member
Cast member	The Kids of Degrassi Street (1979–1986)	Degrassi Junior High (1987–1989)	Degrassi High (1989–1991)	School's Out! (1992)	Degrassi Talks (1992)	Degrassi: The Next Generation (2001–2015)	Degrassi: Next Class (2016–2017)
Stacie Mistysyn	Lisa Canard	Caitlin Ryan	Caitlin Ryan	Caitlin Ryan	Self	Caitlin Ryan	
Sarah Charlesworth	Casey Rothfels	Susie Rivera					
John Ioannou	Pete Riley	Alex Yankou	Alex Yankou				
Tyson Talbot	Billy Martin	Jason Cox					
Christopher Charlesworth	Benjamin Martin	Scooter Webster	Scooter Webster				
Neil Hope	Robin "Griff" Griffith	Derek "Wheels" Wheeler	Derek "Wheels" Wheeler	Derek "Wheels" Wheeler	Self	Derek "Wheels" Wheeler	
Danah-Jean Brown	Connie Jacobs	Trish Skye	Trish Skye	Trish Skye		Trish Skye	
Arlene Lott	Rachel Hewitt	Nancy Kramer	Nancy Kramer	Nancy Kramer			
Anais Granofsky	Karen Gillis	Lucy Fernandez	Lucy Fernandez	Lucy Fernandez	Self	Lucy Fernandez	
Pat Mastroianni		Joey Jeremiah	Joey Jeremiah	Joey Jeremiah	Self	Joey Jeremiah	
Siluck Saysanasy		Yick Yu	Yick Yu	Yick Yu	Self	Yick Yu	
Stefan Brogren		Archie "Snake" Simpson	Archie "Snake" Simpson	Archie "Snake" Simpson	Self	Archie "Snake" Simpson	Archie "Snake" Simpson
Angela Deiseach		Erica Farrell	Erica Farrell	Erica Farrell	Self	Erica Farrell	
Maureen Deiseach		Heather Farrell	Heather Farrell	Heather Farrell	Self	Heather Farrell	
Rebecca Haines		Kathleen Mead	Kathleen Mead		Self	Kathleen Mead	
Amanda Stepto		Christine "Spike" Nelson	Christine "Spike" Nelson	Christine "Spike" Nelson	Self	Christine "Spike" Nelson	
Irene Courakos		Alexa Pappadopoulos	Alexa Pappadopoulos	Alexa Pappadopoulos		Alexa Pappadopoulos	
Michael Carry		Simon Dexter	Simon Dexter	Simon Dexter		Simon Dexter	
Cathy Keenan		Liz O'Rourke	Liz O'Rourke			Liz O'Rourke	
Darrin Brown		Dwayne Myers	Dwayne Myers		Self	Dwayne Myers	
