= L. Dean Ifill =

Canadian actor

- Born: Laurence Dean Ifill; January 5, 1971 (age 55); Toronto, Ontario, Canada
- Occupations: Actor, director, producer, voiceover artist
- Years active: 1986–present

L. Dean Ifill (born Laurence Dean Ifill, January 5, 1971) is a Canadian actor, director, producer and voiceover artist. He played Basil "Bronco" Davis in the original Degrassi High television series and the made-for-television broadcast School's Out. Bronco was the school president and boyfriend of character Lucy Fernandez, played by Anais Granofsky.

Ifill has produced and directed plays and both television and online commercials geared towards North American youth based upon topics that include HIV / AIDS Awareness, Drug Prevention, Bullying, and Making Healthy Choices. Ifill is also the voice of Burn on the Walt Disney and Jetix animated television series Get Ed.

== Filmography ==
=== Film ===
Film
Year	Title	Role	Notes
2020	Little King	Levi	Short film Director; Writer; Producer

=== Television ===
Television
Year	Title	Role	Notes
1990	T. and T.	Boy No. 1	
1990-1991	Degrassi High	Basil "Bronco" Davis	11 episodes
1992	School's Out	Basil "Bronco" Davis	TV movie
1995-1996	Liberty Street	Wade Malone	26 episodes
2002	The Endless Grind	Guillume	Episode 13: "The Endless Grind of People"
2003	The Eleventh Hour	Roman	Also known as Bury the Lead; Season 1, episode 10: "Shelter"
2005	Get Ed	Burn	Voice; main role
2011	Daisy, a Hen Into the Wild	Owl / Ace	Voice; English version Credited as Dean Ifill
2021	Murder on Maple Drive	Coop	TV movie Credited as Laurence Dea Ifill
