= The Zit Remedy =

Fictional Canadian rock band

The Zit Remedy seen performing live at the Degrassi Junior High graduation dance.

The Zit Remedy, later known as The Zits, are a fictional rock band who appear in the Degrassi television franchise. A three-piece group with no live drummer, they are known in the show for their single song "Everybody Wants Something", of which they are shown performing on numerous occasions throughout the series. The band consists of Joey Jeremiah (Pat Mastroianni) on keyboards, Archie "Snake" Simpson (Stefan Brogren) on guitar, and Derek "Wheels" Wheeler (Neil Hope) on bass, with all three sharing lead vocals. For a brief period, Wheels is forced to give up the band for extra tutoring and is replaced by Simon Dexter (Michael Carry). The band is also referenced several times in Degrassi: The Next Generation.

== Role in Degrassi ==
The Zit Remedy first appear as a band in "Parent's Night", the twelfth episode of the first season of Degrassi Junior High. At this point, "Everybody Wants Something" was not performed, and the band are seen excitedly creating tuneless noise, much to the amusement of some and chagrin of others. The song makes its debut in the following episode, "Revolution!". Early in the second season, Wheels' parents and Ms. Avery (Michelle Goodeve) decide he must concentrate on improving his marks, and he is forced to give up on the band in the meantime. During this time, they replace him with new student Simon Dexter (Michael Carry), who they discover playing bass in the school auditorium, though he is never seen performing with them. By the time Wheels is able to perform with the band again, Snake's mom makes him take classical guitar lessons after school. In the second-season finale, Joey is informed he is being held back, which makes him depressed and prompts him to withdraw from the band. He returns in time to perform "Everybody Wants Something" for the graduation dance.

In the third-season premiere, Wheels decides to record a demo with the band instead of seeing a movie with his parents. When returning home from recording the demo, he discovers his parents were killed in a collision with a drunk driver. Angry and withdrawn, he rejects a copy of the demo tape from Joey by throwing it against the wall. Throughout the third season, Joey tries in vain to promote the tape, The Zit Remedy: LIVE!, to other students and eventually the local radio station CRAZ. Joey's girlfriend Caitlin Ryan, also owns a copy of the tape and listens to it, but throws it in the trash when he stands her up at the school dance. Later on, Wheels says he sold his bass and tells Joey that the band is a "joke" that will "never go anywhere".

The band resumes activity in Degrassi High, where they change their name to The Zits and eventually film a music video for "Everybody Wants Something". Later in Degrassi High, Joey says he got a community television channel to air the video. The band is no longer mentioned after this, as Wheels' friendship with Joey and Snake continues to deteriorate. Wheels is sent to prison following his deadly drunk-driving crash in School's Out. "Everybody Wants Something" is mentioned and sung multiple times in Degrassi: The Next Generation, including in the episode "Should I Stay Or Should I Go?", where Wheels briefly reunites with Joey and Snake.

== Background ==
In his book Rocklopedia Fakebandica, T. Mike Childs describes the Zit Remedy as a "new wave-y trio".

=== Everybody Wants Something ===
"Everybody Wants Something", the only song performed by the band, is based on three chords. According to Kathryn Ellis' Degrassi Generations: The Official 411, the show's main composers Lewis Manne and Wendy Watson had sought a song that would be realistically written by a teenager, and received the lyrics, written by their nephew, on the back of a school permission slip. However, Pat Mastroianni, who played Joey Jeremiah, has claimed that he, Brogren, and Hope wrote most of the song themselves. According to Ellis, the three actors were musically inexperienced, and were taught by Manne the fundamental chords for the song. Mastroianni has stated that he and the other two disliked filming the scenes, recalling in 2017: "I was sick of it in the ’80s. … Every time we’d have a read-through and the director’s notes would say ‘and then The Zit Remedy busts out into their song,’ and everybody would be like ‘ugghh,’ we'd moan and groan. And then when we were filming, the crew would be like ‘ugh, not again.’".

While only one song is explicitly named and shown in the series, it is implied in the very beginning of "A Helping Hand" that they have a second song when Snake mentions that "we only have two songs". Likewise, in the novel Exit Stage Left, they are described as performing another song titled "I Don't Want To Be A Porcupine With Anyone Else But You, Baby", which Joey claims will "revolutionize the pop music industry".

== Legacy ==
In 2011, Sydney Morning Herald's Kylie Northover remarked that "a quick Google search reveals a wide affection for - and hundreds of covers of - their "hit" "Everybody Wants Something", and said that the Zit Remedy were "firmly imprinted on the cultural psyche of the decade". Junkee listed the band in their "8 Of The Most Iconically Awkward Degrassi Moments Of All Time" list, saying "the infectious ‘Everybody Wants Something’ engraved itself on the memories of many ‘80s kids" and joked that if it were released commercially, it would have overtaken Roxette's "Listen To Your Heart" at number one on the Canadian charts. Mastroianni opined in 2017: "I think people related to The Zit Remedy because we were so bad as a group, but we had passion and people related to the passion."

== Sources ==
- Childs, T. Mike (2004). The Rocklopedia Fakebandica. St. Martin's Press. ISBN 978-1-4668-7301-8. OCLC 883308109.
- Ellis, Kathryn (2005). The official 411 Degrassi generations. Fenn Pub. Co. ISBN 1-55168-278-8. OCLC 59136593.
