= Byrd Dickens =

Canadian actor and convicted sex offender (born 1971)

Jason Edward Wayne "Byrd" Dickens
- Born: Jason Edward Wayne Dickens; August 11, 1971 (age 55); Windsor, Ontario, Canada
- Occupations: Actor, cameraman
- Years active: 1987–2018
- Criminal penalty: Sentenced to 7.5 years in prison in 2018; released on time served in 2020

Jason Edward Wayne Dickens (born August 11, 1971), better known as Byrd Dickens, is a Canadian former actor, cameraman, and convicted sex offender, who was known for his role as Scott Smith, an abusive boyfriend, on Degrassi High from the late 1980s to early 1990s. Dickens also did minor acting roles and camera and electrical work for various films and television productions. In 2016, Dickens was arrested and charged after committing acts of filming child pornography, possessing child pornography, child molestation, and acts of bestiality with three other women.

== Career ==
Byrd Dickens worked mainly in the electrical, camera, and rigging aspects of various film and television productions. He used various names and company titles and also registered some unlisted company names on his profile on The Internet Movie Database. These unregistered names included "Byrd Dawg" and "Angry Byrd Rigging".

Dickens is best known for his acting role and electrical work on the Canadian teen drama TV series Degrassi High. Dickens played Scott Smith, a jock attending Degrassi High School in Toronto and dating character Kathleen Mead (played by Rebecca Haines). Scott begins abusing Kathleen in the Season 1 episode "Nobody's Perfect", where he mocks her and chokes her with a heart-shaped necklace he has bought for her; the character then breaks Kathleen's arm in a violent altercation in the episode "All In A Good Cause", after which Kathleen presses charges. Dickens continued to appear as Scott in background scenes throughout various episodes of the series, but did not appear in the 1992 television movie finale School's Out.

== Filmography ==
Year	Title	Role
1989–1991	Degrassi High	Scott Smith (10 episodes)

Dickens is also credited with various camera and electrical work on a number of films and television shows, including Scott Pilgrim vs. The World, Beauty & the Beast and xXx: Return of Xander Cage.

== Legal issues ==
=== Early 1990s sexual assault charges ===
In August 1991, shortly following his role on Degrassi High, it was reported that Dickens was facing charges of sexual assault from three women, aged from 19 to 21, who alleged that he raped them in the Brampton and Toronto areas. One of the women, who said she ran a joke fan club for Dickens because he did not receive the same fan mail as his co-stars, stated that they were both Cawthra Park Secondary School alumni and that he raped her on graduation night on June 2, 1990. Dickens denied the charge and was acquitted in November 1992.

=== 2016–2018 arrest and trial ===
Dickens was discovered in 2016 to have engaged in sadistic sexual fetishes and activities of BDSM with his partner whom he'd met in 2004 and married in 2008. Toronto police executed a search warrant in April 2016. Dickens had acquired over 1,000 pornographic photographs and video recordings involving minor children.

Dickens had also been offered a minor child from London, Ontario, in 2003 after the then fourteen-year-old girl, identified to the media only as "DB", had nude photographs taken of her and mailed to Dickens by the girl's mother. Dickens took DB to dinner and a movie (title unknown), then engaged in sexual acts with her in a bedroom while DB's mother watched. DB was a key witness in a 2020 case that unfolded after Dickens's initial conviction in 2018. Dickens entered a guilty plea to charges related to this matter and was sentenced in August 2022.

During the first initial press release from the Toronto Police Service in August 2016, Child Exploitation Section Inspector Pauline Gray and Detective Mike Sabadin confirmed that Dickens was being held in prison without bail. Sabadin, who gave the majority of the briefing, was asked by a reporter whether or not there were dozens or hundreds of pornographic images discovered in Dickens's possession, to which Sabadin replied, "thousands", adding that numerous digital devices including laptop computers, hard drives and cell phones had been seized in the investigation, confirming that Dickens was indeed the former Degrassi actor. Sabadin revealed that Dickens used multiple aliases to explore fetish websites and search for "like-minded individuals" who would share child pornography with him, although Sabadin added that most of the fetish and bondage websites visited by Dickens were not themselves illegal, nor did the websites condone Dickens's pedophilia or bestiality activities.

== Conviction ==
Dickens was discovered to have an extensive stash of illegal child pornography, including images and videos of himself engaging in acts of child abuse and sexual assault. An eight-month investigation unfolded in which Dickens's house and workplace were searched, as well as his internet activity. Three other women were also charged in the offences. It was revealed that Dickens had recorded at least two videos of engaging in child molestation himself, while distributing them on the internet and visiting websites under the screen names "Retrodeviant", "Byrd-Dawg" and "Sir Dirk". During the investigation, Dickens continued to work on various gaffer rigging jobs for film and television productions, including Taxi 22 and xXx: Return of Xander Cage; the cast and crew of both productions were unaware of Dickens's criminal behaviour, as was Rebecca Haines of Degrassi High, who had not seen or heard from Dickens since Degrassi High had ended in the early 1990s.

Dickens pleaded guilty in 2018 to charges including possession and recording of child pornography. Sentenced to 7.5 years, Dickens was released on bail in 2020. Ontario Court Judge Steven Clark denied The Crown's request to designate Dickens as a dangerous offender, arguing that he is not a threat for reoffending and that he had fully cooperated with counselling services and the courts. Dickens was released unsupervised, but was implicated in another criminal charge in 2020 relating to his 2003 offences.

== See also ==
- List of Degrassi Junior High & Degrassi High characters
