= Degrassi Talks =

Canadian documentary miniseries (1992)

- Genre: Video journalism
- Created by: Linda Schuyler; Kit Hood
- Presented by: Rebecca Haines; Neil Hope; Pat Mastroianni; Stacie Mistysyn; Siluck Saysanasy; Amanda Stepto
- Theme music composer: Stacie Mistysyn; Keith White
- Country of origin: Canada
- No. of episodes: 6

Production
- Executive producer: Linda Schuyler
- Cinematography: Rebecca Haines Neil Hope; Pat Mastroianni; Stacie Mistysyn; Siluck Saysanasy Amanda Stepto
- Running time: 30 minutes (including commercials)
- Production company: Playing With Time, Inc.

Original release
- Network: CBC
- Release: February 24 – March 30, 1992

Degrassi Talks is a Canadian non-fiction documentary television miniseries and part of the Degrassi franchise created by Linda Schuyler and Kit Hood. Running six episodes from February 24 to March 30, 1992, it featured actors from Degrassi Junior High and Degrassi High taking the role of journalists and conducting interviews with other teenagers and young adults across Canada on various topics addressed by the series such as abuse, substance addiction, homophobia, and teenage pregnancy. It combined candid and man-on-the-street interviews as well as relevant archive footage from the television series and on-screen statistics. Each episode was hosted by an actor whose character had some relation to the focused subject.

The theme song was composed by actors Stacie Mistysyn and Keith White. Companion books based on each episode were also published by Boardwalk Books, prefaced with biographical interviews of the actor who presented the original episode. The show received critical acclaim, but proved less popular with teenage viewers, who felt the information provided to be redundant and at times perpetuating certain stereotypes. Broadcast after the television movie School's Out but filmed before, it was the last Degrassi series until the franchise was revived in 2001 with Degrassi: The Next Generation.

== Premise and production ==
Degrassi actors Rebecca Haines (Kathleen), Neil Hope (Wheels), Pat Mastroianni (Joey), Stacie Mistysyn (Caitlin), Siluck Saysanasy (Yick), and Amanda Stepto (Spike) travelled around Canada to discuss health and social issues with other teenagers.

Degrassi Talks was created by Linda Schuyler and Kit Hood. The series was funded by the ministry of then Health Minister Benoît Bouchard, who contributed $300,000 to the development of the series.

Promotion began for the series as early as November 1990, with an extensive transit and flyer ad campaign. Following this, a toll-free number was advertised. Five hundred teenagers called, of which most of the forty seen in the series were selected to be interviewed on camera. Each episode was hosted by an actor from the series whose character experienced the issue discussed. The cast members were put through production workshops and taught how to handle video equipment. The filming of the show took place in early-mid 1991, shortly before principal photography began on the telemovie School's Out.

The actors conducted interviews across the country, staging both candid and man-on-the-street interviews in a journalistic fashion. and recording what Schuyler described as "miles of footage". The actors stopped at 26 cities, including the country's major cities as well as smaller cities such as Grand Centre in Alberta, Whitehorse in the Yukon, and Peggy's Cove in Nova Scotia. The show also displayed relevant clips from the Degrassi series, as well as facts and statistics on-screen. Schuyler said at the time that PBS, who aired Degrassi in the United States, had been interested in the series.

=== Theme song ===
The show's theme is a duet composed by Keith White, who played Tim O'Connor, and sung by him and Stacie Mistysyn. At the time, Mistysyn had been rehearsing with an unnamed band, and she and White had begun collaborating in creating music. The opening sequence features shots of Mistysyn and White recording the song in a studio.

== Release ==
The first episode, "...On Sex", was screened for a group of Ottawa high school students on February 12, 1992, with the six main hosts in attendance. It then ran on CBC from February 24 to March 30, 1992. The series was re-run in 1995 on CBC. That same year, the series also aired in the United States on WNET as well as Australia on ABC TV.

== Reception ==
Degrassi Talks garnered a positive reception from television critics at the time of its release. In a profile of the series for the Montreal Gazette, writer Mike Boone gave the series a positive review. Boone called it a "rare series" in what he described as a "teenless wasteland" on Canadian television, citing a lack of teen-oriented programming on the country's television networks. He further stated that the series featured "faces and voices seldom heard or seen on prime-time network TV". Erick Kohanik of The Hamilton Spectator praised the premiere episode Sex for its "frank talk", also noting how it had a "good street feel". Hester Riches of the Vancouver Sun compared it to "a typical Degrassi episode [...] working in a non-judgmental way". Joan Weller of The Ottawa Citizen similarly praised the companion books, noting how the actors also discuss their own relations to the problems in the introductions.

Despite being critically acclaimed, the initial Ottawa screening drew a mixed reaction. One student asked the cast members why the only person with HIV depicted in the episode was effeminate. A journalist from the Waterloo Region Record interviewed a group of students from the area, the majority of whom panned the series or viewed it as unnecessary, with one student stating: "I thought it insulted my intelligence."

Degrassi Talks was nominated for the Gemini Award for Best Youth Program or Series in 1993.

== Episodes ==
No.	Title	Directed by	Written by	Original release date
1	"...On Sex"	Linda Schuyler, Philip Earnshaw & Kit Hood	Susin Nielsen & Laura L. Vickers	February 24, 1992
Amanda Stepto (Spike) hosts an episode that explores the stories of teenagers who are facing the consequences of sexual activity. Topics include teenage pregnancy, AIDS, and infertility. Anais Granofsky (Lucy) interviews 16 year old mother Vicki, who is unable to date and socialize due to her responsibilities. Stepto herself interviews a woman named Shantih, who had given her baby up for adoption. Stepto reveals to her that she herself is adopted. A 17 year old girl named Angie details how she became infertile as a result of contracting sexually transmitted diseases. A couple named Lucy and Kurt, who enjoy an unproblematic sex life, are also interviewed. Darrin Brown (Dwayne Myers) makes an appearance interviewing Bentley, a young HIV-positive man who taught sex education to high school students. Note: Stepto's character dealt with teenage pregnancy. The actress had previously discussed her adopted background in an interview with Janice Kannedy of the Montreal Gazette in 1988.
2	"...On Alcohol"	Linda Schuyler, Philip Earnshaw & Kit Hood	Susin Nielsen & Laura L. Vickers	March 2, 1992
Neil Hope (Wheels) explores the effects of alcohol abuse among Canadian youth, as well as drunk driving. Rebecca Haines (Kathleen) interviews 17 year old Teresa, who struggled with alcohol. Neil Hope interviews 18 year old Nathan, whose parents split as a result of alcohol and who struggled with drinking himself. Hope mentions 15 year old Jimmy Whiffen, who died from alcohol poisoning. Two sisters, Missy and Michele, who lost their mother in a drunk driving crash, and a driver, Michael, involved in a crash himself and later incarcerated, are also interviewed. Note: Hope's character lost his parents in a vehicular crash with a drunk driver. In the episode, Neil Hope reveals that he had lost his father to an alcoholic disease. He previously discussed this in the 1989 documentary Degrassi Between Takes. Nicole Stoffman, who played Degrassi Junior High character Stephanie Kaye, appears via archive footage from the Season 1 episode "The Big Dance".
3	"...On Abuse"	Linda Schuyler, Philip Earnshaw & Kit Hood	Susin Nielsen & Laura L. Vickers	March 9, 1992
Rebecca Haines (Kathleen) hosts an episode which explores young victims of abuse, such as emotional, physical, and sexual. Neil Hope interviews Matt, a 20 year old man who was severely whipped by his stepfather, and began abusing drugs, which lead him to be jailed for stealing. Siluck Saysanasy interviews Cathy, a 17 year old girl from the Yukon who suffered abuse from every boy she had dated. Stacie Mistysyn interviews La'Quita, a 21 year old woman with cerebral palsy who suffered years of emotional abuse from her parents, and Mathieu, a 17 year old French-Canadian boy who was abused by his father from 9 to 15 years old. Haines interviews Debi, an 18 year old woman who was date-raped. Amanda Stepto interviews Kimberley, a 19 year old woman who was forced to give her boyfriend oral sex constantly. Pat Mastroianni interviews Peter, an 18 year old man who was sexually abused by a babysitter, and a man in Vancouver named Jim, an abuser whose face is obscured. Debi is later revisited several months later, where she had begun dating a new boyfriend who was supportive. Note: Haines's character was the victim of physical abuse by her boyfriend. In the episode, Rebecca Haines reveals that two years prior, she was the victim of date rape, and had been inspired to become public with it and get counseling after interviewing another woman who had been date raped.
4	"...On Depression"	Linda Schuyler, Philip Earnshaw & Kit Hood	Susin Nielsen & Laura L. Vickers	March 16, 1992
Pat Mastroianni (Joey) explores the subject of depression, including those expressing fear of environmental damage, peer pressure, and alienation. In Alberta, Mastroianni interviews Dean, a 21 year old man with fears about pollution, and Don and Carol, a couple, and whom the latter suffers from depression. Angela Deiseach (Erica) interviews Leith, a 23 year old man who suffered bullying for his race, sexual orientation, and grades in school. Amanda Stepto interviewed Linda, a 17 year old girl who suffers anorexia nervosa and low self-esteem. Stefan Brogren talked to Derek, whose brother suffered depression caused by a chemical imbalance and later committed suicide. A disclaimer notes that on May 15, 1991, interviewee Carol took her own life via a drug overdose, in the lead up to her wedding with Don. Note: Mastroianni's character experienced brief depression when his girlfriend ended their relationship. In the episode and in the companion book, Mastroianni revealed that he was emotionally affected by Carol's suicide and Don's reaction to it.
5	"...On Drugs"	Linda Schuyler, Philip Earnshaw & Kit Hood	Susin Nielsen & Laura L. Vickers	March 23, 1992
Siluck Saysanasy (Yick) explores the subject of drug abuse, such as the effect it has on families, relationships, and the abuser themselves. Maureen McKay (Michelle) interviews Keith, a 22 year old man who became addicted to Ritalin. Stacie Mistysyn interviews Rita, a 17 year old girl whose parents became heroin addicts and introduced her to cocaine when she was nine years old. Saysanasy interviews James, a 17 year old boy who became an alcoholic, and his 20 year old sister Cathy. In Winnipeg, Pat Mastroianni interviews Brian, a 23 year old man who previously abused solvents. Neil Hope interviews Shawn, a 17 year old boy. Cathy, from Abuse, is revisited, where she describes taking psychedelics and injecting cocaine with older friends. Matt from Abuse is also revisited, where he describes taking drugs to escape his problems. Note: Saysanasy's character began smoking in high school. In the episode, Saysanasy is asked by an interviewee if he smoked, and he later reveals that he did, and struggled to quit.
6	"...On Sexuality"	Linda Schuyler, Philip Earnshaw & Kit Hood	Susin Nielsen & Laura L. Vickers	March 30, 1992
Stacie Mistysyn (Caitlin Ryan) explores the subject of sexuality, including puberty, and homosexuality. Mistysyn interviewed her co-stars Pat Mastroianni, Stefan Brogren, Angela Deiseach and Kristen Bourne (Tessa). Shawn from Drugs and Bentley from Sex are also revisited, the former about masturbation and the latter on homophobia. Brogren interviewed a man who had suffered homophobia from his peers and his teachers. Mistysyn mentions the Murder of Kenneth Zeller, a gay teacher who was beaten to death. Mistysyn also interviews her own sister, Kim, a lesbian whose gay, lesbian and bisexual alliance at school received threats of violence and discriminatory messages. Note: Mistysyn's character briefly questioned her sexuality.

== Books ==
Cover of the Degrassi Talks book Sex.

To coincide with the debut of the series in February 1992, Boardwalk Books published companion books based from the six episodes. The books, which contain more content than the television series, feature an image the host of the episode, usually while holding camera equipment on the front cover, and a preface written by Degrassi writer Catherine Dunphy, profiling the actor who hosted the episode. The books also feature expanded versions of several interviews seen in the series, as well as other interviews that were not shown in the series due to time constraints.

No. in series	Title	Front cover	ISBN
1	"Sex"	Amanda Stepto	ISBN 1551200007, 978-1551200002
2	"Alcohol"	Neil Hope	ISBN 1895681006, 978-1895681000
3	"Abuse"	Rebecca Haines	ISBN 1895681022, 978-1895681024
4	"Depression"	Pat Mastroianni	ISBN 1551200031, 9781551200033
5	"Drugs"	Siluck Saysanasy	ISBN 155120004X, 9781551200040
6	"Sexuality"	Stacie Mistysyn	ISBN 1551200058, 9781551200057

== Home media and streaming ==
Degrassi Talks was packaged in the Degrassi Junior High DVD set released in October 2005.

DVD name	Ep #	Region 1	Region 2	Region 4	DVD Special Features
The Complete Series	42	25 October 2005	N/A	28 April 2006	Degrassi Talks Series; Degrassi Behind The Scenes; Photo Gallery

It was announced that the series would be available to stream on Amazon Prime Video on July 18, 2023.
