= Derek Wheeler =

Fictional character from the Degrassi franchise

- Degrassi character
- Publicity photograph of Derek "Wheels" Wheeler in an episode of the third season of Degrassi Junior High.
- First appearance: Degrassi Junior High: January 18, 1987 (episode 1.01: "Kiss Me Steph")
- Last appearance: Degrassi: The Next Generation: October 29, 2003 (episode 3.07: "Should I Stay Or Should I Go?")
- Portrayed by: Neil Hope

In-universe information
- Nickname: Wheels
- Occupation: Auto Mechanic
- Family: Mike Nelson (biological father); Unnamed biological mother Helen Wheeler (adoptive mother); John Wheeler (adoptive father); Unnamed maternal grandmother Unnamed maternal grandfather

Derek Wheeler is a fictional character from the Degrassi teen drama franchise. He was portrayed by Neil Hope. He appears throughout Degrassi Junior High and Degrassi High, with two cameo appearances in Degrassi: The Next Generation. His role throughout the former two series primarily concerns his friendship with Joey Jeremiah (Pat Mastroianni) and Archie "Snake" Simpson (Stefan Brogren), and later the death of his adoptive parents in a traffic collision with a drunk driver. Throughout the series, he plays with Joey and Snake in a band called The Zit Remedy, who are always seen performing one song.

In the aftermath of his parents' death, Wheels' behavior undergoes a significant decline, causing tension between himself and his grandparents, who eventually evict him from their house. Joey lets Wheels stay at his house, until too kicking him out when he discovers Wheels had been stealing money from his mother. In the television movie School's Out, Wheels begins to drink heavily, and ends up killing a two-year-old boy and blinding the school valedictorian Lucy Fernandez in a car accident. This causes a disgusted Snake, who already is angry at Joey for another reason, to sever ties with him, effectively ending the three's friendship. In Next Generation, he briefly appears at the ten-year school reunion to apologize to Lucy, and then again in the third season, where he reconciles with the ailing Snake. An eponymous novel was released in 1992 which explored the character in greater detail.

Upon the news of actor Neil Hope's death, which occurred in 2007 but was not publicized until 2012, critics wrote of Wheels as a tragic figure of the series, and noted the correlation between his character's troubled life, as well as his own.

== Development ==
Hope developed a fascination in the behind-the-scenes aspects of television production when he was young, and with the help of his father, pursued a career in acting. Hope's sister-in-law worked at a shelter for battered women nearby the set of The Kids of Degrassi Street, where a billboard was displayed that advertised auditions for the show. According to Hope, his sister-in-law informed him about the audition, but he was hesitant: "I didn't want to go down because I had been auditioning for a year and wasn't getting any work. I was getting very discouraged."

Hope's father, who supported his son's acting career and paid for his training, pushed him to audition, and Hope gave his resume and picture to the producers of the show. According to Hope, he was one of 30 or 40 kids who had auditioned that day. Hope was later called back and asked to read for a guest role in one episode. A day later, he was informed that he had gotten the part. Hope portrayed Robin "Griff" Griffiths on The Kids of Degrassi Street from 1985 to 1986.

During development of Degrassi Junior High, several of the actors were offered roles in the new series, but were asked whether they wanted to reprise the same roles, or wanted to play new characters. Hope would return for Degrassi Junior High, now playing the character Derek "Wheels" Wheeler.

In 1987, Hope's father died from cirrhosis of the liver, due to alcoholism. In the third season of Degrassi Junior High, Wheels' adoptive parents are killed in a vehicular collision by a drunk driver. Hope explained that he had chosen to explore this story for his character as a result of his father's death. Hope would later remark that in filming the funeral of his characters' parents, he saw his father and brother in the two caskets meant to represent his character's parents; in 1989, Hope remarked, "In a way it helped, because I was putting my emotions along with Wheels' emotions into it." However, in 1992, he would recall: "We had to stop shooting because Wheels wasn't supposed to cry because he was angry. But I couldn't keep it back any more."

In his final interview in 2005, Hope told former co-star Stefan Brogren that he felt "another season or two" of Degrassi High might have been "beneficial" in his life.

== Role in Degrassi ==
=== Degrassi Junior High ===
Wheels was born Derek Michael Nelson to a pair of teenage parents, but shortly after his birth he is adopted by John and Helen Wheeler in a closed adoption. Wheels, Joey and Snake together form a garage band called "The Zit Remedy", later shortened to "The Zits" in high school.

Wheels first appears as a grade eight student in Mr. Raditch's homeroom class. Wheels attempts the first of two ill-fated dates with class president Stephanie Kaye, which ends early when she gets sick from having consumed too much alcohol. Several episodes later, Stephanie asks him out again. Facing peer pressure to "go all the way", Wheels purchases a box of condoms from a drug store. When he shows up at Stephanie's house on date night, he learns that Stephanie's mother is also the pharmacist who sold him the condoms. When Wheels loses interest in her, Stephanie attempts to make him jealous by openly flirting with Joey, which ultimately backfires on her. Shortly after his fourteenth birthday, Wheels meets his biological father Mike Nelson, a struggling musician. He later counsels pregnant classmate Christine "Spike" Nelson (Amanda Stepto) on whether to keep her unborn child or put her up for adoption. Wheels explains that he is grateful to both his natural parents for having given him a chance at a better life, and to his adoptive parents for providing that better life to him.

Wheels' poor grades become an issue in season two and Wheels learns that he is nearsighted and begins to wear glasses. Wheels also enrolls in after-school tutoring with Ms. Avery, forcing him to put music on hold. During a break from a tutoring session, he witnesses substitute homeroom teacher Mr. Colby attempting to sexually molest classmate Lucy and breaks it up. Lucy confided in him, and Wheels promised to corroborate her story when she eventually came forward. Thanks to the extra tutoring, his grades improve enough that he is allowed to resume playing music with the Zit Remedy. Later, Wheels and Joey sleep over at Snake's home when his parents leave him on his own for the weekend. They stay up all night and when they wake up late the next morning, Wheels realizes that he is going to be late for an optometrist appointment. Joey drives them both in Snake's parents' car, despite having neither a driver's license nor any formal driving skills. After they get caught—for fixing a broken tail light—Wheels' parents forbid him to associate with Joey as a result. Wheels heads into final exams still concerned about his grades; he gets promoted while Joey learns he's being left back. Despite these factors, the Zit Remedy perform live for the first time at the end-of-the-year dance.

At the start of season three, John and Ellen Wheeler are killed in a car accident caused by a drunk driver. Wheels was to have been with them that evening; instead he lies about having to study before sneaking off to Joey's house where the band records a demo of "Everybody Wants Something." The grieving Wheels withdraws from his friends, then blames Joey for him not being with his parents that night. Wheels eventually reconciles with Joey and Snake, but is unable to articulate his grief. Wheels is then cared for by his maternal grandparents, but the tragedy affects him for the remainder of the show's run. He takes to using his parents' death as an excuse for his own failings, and is hostile to his grandparents' attempts to discipline him. After receiving a postcard from his biological father, Wheels hitchhikes to see him in Port Hope, Ontario; along the way, he is nearly molested by a traveling salesman who gives him a ride. Mike is surprised to see him and dashes Wheels' dream of living with him; after introducing Wheels to his pregnant fiancé, Maggie, Mike sends Wheels back to his adoptive grandparents. Later in the season, Wheels cites his parents' death as the reason he turns down an offer to drink beer with Snake and Joey.

=== Degrassi High ===
Wheels, Joey, and Snake enter high school with their bond intact. In a move to display maturity, they change their band's name from the Zit Remedy to "The Zits". They each survive a hazing by bully Dwayne, shoot a music video for "Everybody Wants Something", try to get into a strip joint together, and perform in a "feminist" horror movie directed by Lucy. Wheels also shares a passionate kiss with Heather, but does not reciprocate her interest in him.

The final season revisits Wheels' conflicts with his elderly grandparents. They eventually tire of his lies, disobedience and theft, and evict him. Joey's parents allow him to stay at the Jeremiah house. Wheels is eventually kicked out when he is suspected of stealing from Joey's mother. The theft and Wheels' attempt to shift the blame drive a wedge between Wheels and Joey, though he later confesses. Snake's parents refuse to let Wheels in the Simpson house but Snake, though fed up with Wheels' attitude, takes pity on him and lets him sleep the night on the porch. Wheels and Joey reconcile their relationship when Wheels proves his new-found integrity by paying Joey's mother back the money he stole from her, and performs at the school talent show, alongside Joey and in place of Snake.

In the made-for-television movie Degrassi: School's Out, Wheels is assumed to have graduated from high school, is working as an auto mechanic, and is preparing for a move to Calgary to be with his girlfriend Karen. (Note: CBC Television, Playing With Time, Inc. (January 5, 1992). School's Out (Television movie).) In a twist of irony, Wheels also has become a heavy beer drinker. At a summer party, he drives Lucy under the influence of alcohol to pick up snacks, and collides with another car. In doing so, he temporarily blinds and partially cripples Lucy, and kills a young child in the other car. Although Wheels had long worn out Joey's and Snake's sympathy after incessantly lying, stealing and refusing to take responsibility for anything, Joey nevertheless visits him in pre-trial confinement. However, Wheels' inability to accept culpability shocks Joey, and disgusts Snake, who refuses to forgive him. He is charged with "criminal negligence causing death, criminal negligence causing injury times two, and drunk driving". Taking responsibility for once, he pleads guilty to all charges.

=== The Next Generation ===
Wheels is released from prison by the time the events of The Next Generation. He briefly appears in the series' pilot episode "Mother and Child Reunion", in which he apologizes to Lucy on the front steps of Degrassi Community School. His appearance, however, is only shown in the Canadian version on CTV and not in the American version shown on The N. Wheels is mentioned by Snake and it is shown that Snake has still not forgiven Wheels for his actions ten years prior, and Wheels can be seen in old photographs viewed by the characters. Two years later, Joey finally manages to reunite the old friends when taking Snake out bowling to get the latter's mind off of his leukaemia and chemotherapy. Snake initially wants nothing to do with Wheels, but they bond over both having wanted to die (Wheels after killing the child, and Snake while dealing with his ailment and its treatment). The three are witnessed by Spike and her daughter Emma from inside singing "Everybody Wants Something" on the ride home in Joey's convertible.

== Novelization ==
A tie-in mass-market paperback novelization of Wheels' story, written by Susin Nielsen, was released by James Lorimer & Co. in 1992, with a reprint in 2006. The novel explores Wheels' parents' death, as well as expanding on his subsequent behavioral decline, as he fights with his friends, hangs out with a street gang, and attracts attention from law enforcement.

== Legacy ==
Wheels was considered to be a tragic figure of the Degrassi series. Samantha Allemann of Junkee described Wheels as "arguably Degrassi's most tragic character". In light of the news of Hope's death in 2012, despite having occurred five years prior, critics noted the correlation between the character's troubled life, as well as the actor's own. The New York Times' Paul Vitello called Wheels "the Job of the cast". Katie Daubs, writing for the Toronto Star, described Wheels as a "complex character" who "routinely blamed others for his problems". Writing for The Daily Beast, Glynnis MacNicol described Wheels as the embodiment of the show's honest portrayal of high school students: "We all knew him. He was the kid who never failed out of class but never dazzled either. The kid who sometimes got into trouble, but never enough to make him the bad boy. The kid who hung out with the guy you wanted to date (in this case, Joey Jeremiah). The kid whose parents you never saw and who sometimes showed up to school in the same outfit a few days in a row. He was the kid you lost track of after high school."

However, co-star Dan Woods, who played Principal Raditch, opined that comparing Hope to his character was "so far from the whole picture of Neil", calling him a "bright-eyed performer" who never brought personal issues to the set. In the Degrassi Junior High episode "It's Late", Wheels is shown wearing a sweater for the Footscray Bulldogs (now Western Bulldogs), an Australian rules football team, a scene which "impressed and bewildered" Australian fans of the show.

== See also ==
- Joey Jeremiah, Wheels' friend and Zit Remedy bandmate
