= Dayo Ade =

Canadian actor (born 1972)

- Born: 1972 (age 53–54); Lagos, Nigeria
- Occupation: Actor
- Years active: 1988−present

Dayo Ade (born 1972) is a Canadian actor who is best known for his role as Bryant Lester Thomas "BLT" in the Degrassi television franchise, appearing in Degrassi Junior High (1987–89) and Degrassi High (1989–91). Ade has had numerous film and television appearances, most notably playing the role of Mel Boyd in the CBC sitcom Workin' Moms.

== Biography ==
He was born in Lagos, Nigeria and moved with his family to Toronto, Ontario, Canada at an early age. He played Bryant Lester "BLT" Thomas in Degrassi Junior High and Degrassi High. He described the payment for the series as "(expletive) nothing" in 2025 documentary Degrassi: Whatever It Takes. The statement was contested by series co-creator Linda Schuyler, who noted cast have a retirement fund and a scholarship foundation. Ade's jobs after that role included working for car rental and security companies.

In recent decades, he appeared as nurse Leo Beckett on the CBC Television series Cracked. He voiced as Hunter Hakka in Starlink: Battle for Atlas.

He also had guest appearances in the Star Trek: Enterprise episode "Borderland", in the Alias episode "The Awful Truth", in the Scrubs episode "My Malpractical Decision", and in the Charmed episode "We're Off to See the Wizard". He appeared in the Lost episodes "What Kate Does" and "Lighthouse".

In 2021, he joined the cast of Bob Hearts Abishola as Abishola's Nigerian husband Tayo Adebambo, and starred in the film Cinema of Sleep. At the 2021 Whistler Film Festival, he won the award for Best Performance in a Borsos Competition Film for Cinema of Sleep.

Dayo has spoken of the financial difficulties those in the entertainment industry face in support of the 2023 SAG-AFTRA strike.

== Filmography ==
=== Film ===
Film
Year	Title	Role	Notes
1993	Save My Lost Nigga Soul	Matthew	Short film
1995	Rude	Mike	
1995	Jungleground	Cowboy	
2006	Phat Girlz	Godwin	
2007	Gettin' Some Jail Time	Uncle JG	Short film
2008	Remembering Phil	Officer Williams	
2010	Unthinkable	MP Winston	
2011	Let Go	Charles	
2013	Refuge	Agent Hammond	Short film
2018	Isabelle	Father Lopez	
2018	Fanboy	CAA Security Officer	Short film
2020	Toys of Terror	David	
2022	Labyu with an Accent	Officer Kel Isah	

=== Television ===
Television
Year	Title	Role	Notes
1988–1991	Degrassi Junior High / Degrassi High	Bryant Lester "BLT" Thomas	48 episodes - 21 uncredited
1991	Top Cops	Snaggs / Que	Season 2, episode 9: "Ronald Bratton/John Thompson and Christine Bridges"
1992	Degrassi Talks	Himself	Episode 5: "...On Drugs"
1992	School's Out	Bryant Lester "BLT" Thomas	TV movie
1993–1995	The Kids in the Hall	Male Guard #1 / Rebel	2 episodes
1996	Due South	Trevor - Thug #1	Season 2, episode 13: "White Men Can't Jump to Conclusions"
1997	Color of Justice	Prisoner	TV movie
1998	My Own Country	John Okri	TV movie
2001	V.I.P.	B.J. Finley	Season 3, episode 13: "Val on Fire"
2001	Resurrection Blvd.	Taylor "The Hurt" Bryant	2 episodes
2002	First Monday	Dwayne Yong	Episode 1: "First Monday"
2002	Charmed	Bodyguard #3	Season 4, episode 19: "We're Off to See the Wizard"
2002	The District	Toro	Season 2, episode 22: "Payback"
2003	The Shield	Lionel	Season 2, episode 9: "Co-Pilot"
2003	Boomtown	Banger	Season 2, episode 9: "Co-Pilot"
2003	10-8: Officers on Duty	Spatz	Episode 1: "Brothers in Arms"
2004	Las Vegas	Cedric "The Cannibal" Barimba	Season 1, episode 11: "Blood and Sand"
2004	Girlfriends	Vendor	Season 4, episode 24: "New York Unbound"
2004	Joan of Arcadia	Rueben	Season 2, episode 2: "Out of Sight"
2004	Star Trek: Enterprise	Klingon Tactical Officer	Season 4, episode 4: "Borderland"
2004	Scrubs	Mr. Hovey	Season 4, episode 9: "My Malpractical Decision"
2005	Alias	Bank Manager	Season 4, episode 3: "The Awful Truth"
2007	Without a Trace	Omar Manir	Season 5, episode 24: "The Beginning"
2007	NCIS	ER Orderly	Season 4, episode 24: "Angel of Death"
2007	The Bill Engvall Show	Bouncer	Season 1, episode 7: "The Birthday"
2007	ER	James Rollins	Season 14, episode 3: "Officer Down"
2008	CSI: NY	Robert James	2 episodes
2010	Castle Rock	Anton Wade	Season 2, episode 15: "Suicide Squeeze"
2010	Lost	Justin	2 episodes
2010	NCIS: Los Angeles	Nelson Shabazz	Season 1, episode 19: "Hand-to-Hand"
2010	Chase	Tucker Dawes	Episode 3: "The Comeback Kid"
2012	The L.A. Complex	Dynasty	11 episodes
2013	Cracked	Leo Beckett	21 episodes
2014	Republic of Doyle	Brian Mitchell	Season 3, episode 13: "Welcome Back Crocker"
2014	Agents of S.H.I.E.L.D.	Agent Barbour	Season 1, episode 17: "Turn, Turn, Turn"
2015	The Book of Negroes	Prince	Miniseries; Episode 4
2015	Rookie Blue	Russ	3 episodes
2015	Bones	Cooper Blackthorn	Season 11, episode 8: "High Treason in the Holiday Season"
2016	Criminal Minds: Beyond Borders	Paul Ntombi	Season 1, episode 10: "Iqiniso"
2016	Beauty & the Beast	Dawes	2 episodes
2016–2018	Heartland	Jim Parker	3 episodes
2017–2018	Startup	Officer Jules	5 episodes
2018	Insomnia	Phil	4 episodes
2018	Animal Kingdom	Detective French	Season 3, episode 1: "The Killing"
2019	The Rookie	Jonathan Ryland	Season 2, episode 6: "Fallout"
2019–2021; 2023	Workin' Moms	Mel Boyd	11 episodes
2020	October Faction	Moshe	5 episodes
2020	The Comey Rule	Shaun	Miniseries; 2 episodes
2021	Private Eyes	Ben Riggs	Season 4, episode 9: "A Star Is Torn"
2021–present	Bob Hearts Abishola	Tayo	11 episodes
2022	Chicago Med	Dorian Harwell	Season 7, episode 20: "End of the Day, Anything Can Happen"

=== Video games ===
Video games
Year	Title	Role	Notes
2007	Robert Ludlum's The Bourne Conspiracy		Voice
2018	Starlink: Battle for Atlas	Hunter Hakka	Voice
2019	Tom Clancy's Ghost Recon Breakpoint	Josiah Hill	Voice
