= Spike (novel) =

Book based on Degrassi Junior High

- Cover of Australian release
- Author: Loretta Castellarin; Ken Roberts
- Genre: Problem novel
- Published: December 1988
- Publisher: James Lorimer & Company
- Publication place: Canada
- Pages: 116

Spike is a novel based on the Canadian television series Degrassi Junior High. It was published by James Lorimer & Company in December 1988 as part of a series of novels focusing on individual characters from the show. The novel centres around Christine "Spike" Nelson, who deals with teenage pregnancy and motherhood and its effects on her social life. The book expands upon the storylines of several key episodes about the character.

== Synopsis ==
The novel, written in first-person, loosely follows the storyline of Christine "Spike" Nelson, a punk-dressed student at Degrassi Junior High School. Spike begins to date Shane McKay, a "kind of well-scrubbed" boy who she meets at a soccer game. Their relationship culminates in a sexual encounter at a party held by their classmate Lucy Fernandez, which results in Spike having an unplanned pregnancy. As her pregnancy progresses, her relationship with Shane deteriorates, due to his succumbing to peer pressure and his conservative parents who don't want him to be involved. Spike's classmates eventually become accustomed to her pregnancy.

As Spike begins to show, a three hundred-signature petition emerges, calling for her removal from the school. School administrator Doris Bell advises Spike to try and get a lawyer, as the school board may be unauthorized to remove her per the Education Act. The petition succeeds and she is forced to continue her studies at home. Her mother later proves to be unwilling to support her daughter, lashing out at her when she decides to keep the baby rather than put it up for adoption.

== Development ==
Co-author Loretta Castellarin contributed to the development of the character of Spike by having done extensive research on teenage pregnancy, including statistics and interviewing teenage mothers about their experiences. Castellarin, with help from Ken Roberts, took various scripts from the television series and expanded upon them for the novel.

== Reception ==
The novel received positive reviews upon its release and retrospectively. It was praised for its structure, characters and message; Bronwyn Weaver noted that the novel relied heavily on "character self-reflection". Bob Remington, writing in the Brandon Sun, said: "The book gives a sensitive rendering of sex and the trauma of teen pregnancy." In addition, Remington said that like the TV show, the book "relates the issue without moralizing". Author Kristin Butcher also praised the novel's 2006 reissue, calling it "exceptional" and singling out the credibility of its characters and its plot, but pointed out various typos, which she felt was jarring to the pace of the text.

== Promotion ==
To promote the book, actress Amanda Stepto and co-author Loretta Castellarin embarked on a nationwide publicity tour after the show's final day of filming in December 1988 and into the following year, making appearances at various public libraries and shopping malls to discuss the book and answer questions.
