= Degrassi Classic novels =

Degrassi Junior High and High novels
- Author: Susin Nielsen; Kathryn Ellis; Catherine Dunphy; Nazneen Sadiq; Loretta Castellarin; Ken Roberts; William Pasnak
- Country: Canada
- Language: English
- Publisher: James Lorimer & Company
- Published: 1987-1992, 2006
- Media type: Print
- No. of books: 12

Degrassi Classic novels are a series of mass market paperback novelizations of the Canadian teen drama series Degrassi Junior High and Degrassi High. Released by James Lorimer & Co. from 1988 to 1992, the novels sometimes adapted plots from the series, but also elaborated on plots not addressed completely on the series. The books would often center on a particular character on the show, although the novel Exit Stage Left is based on the overall series. A thirteenth book, based on the characters Arthur and Yick and written by Kathryn Ellis, remains unreleased. Lorimer reprinted several of the books at the height of Degrassi: The Next Generation's popularity in 2006.

The books were also published in other places; in Australia, they were published by ABC in November 1990. The books also saw French Canadian releases by Les Éditions de Minuit.

== List of books ==
Name	Written by	Published	ISBN
Exit Stage Left	William Pasnak	1987	ISBN 1550280155, 978-1550280159
Stephanie Kaye	Ken Roberts	1988	ISBN 1550281097, 978-1550282542
Spike	Loretta Castellarin, Ken Roberts	1988	ISBN 155028925X, 978-1550289251
Melanie	Susin Nielsen	1989	ISBN 1550282549, 978-1550282542
Joey Jeremiah	Catherine Dunphy	1989	ISBN 1550282336, 978-1550282337
Shane	Susin Nielsen	1989	ISBN 1550282352, 978-1550282351
Lucy	Nazneen Sadiq	1989	ISBN 1550289381, 978-1550282337
Wheels	Susin Nielsen	1990	ISBN 0733302211, 978-0733302213
Caitlin	Catherine Dunphy	1990	ISBN 1550289233, 978-1550289237
Snake	Catherine Dunphy	1991	ISBN 1550283707, 978-1550283709
Maya	Kathryn Ellis	1992	ISBN 1550283634, 978-1550283631
BLT	Catherine Dunphy	1992	ISBN 155028374X, 978-1550283747

== Reception ==
The 2006 re-releases of Spike, Caitlin, Joey Jeremiah, and Snake received a favourable review from author Kristin Butcher, particularly singling out Snake and Spike.
