= Siluck Saysanasy =

Laotian-Canadian actor

- Born: January 30, 1974 (age 52); Vientiane, Laos
- Occupations: Actor, Director

Siluck Saysanasy (born January 30, 1974) is a Laotian Canadian television actor.

Saysanasy is best known for playing Yick Yu, a character in the Degrassi series. He went to high school at Vaughan Road Academy in Toronto, Ontario, in the Interact program.

One of his real-life best friends is Pat Mastroianni, who played Joey Jeremiah on Degrassi.

Since 2002, Saysanasy has worked as an assistant director on shows such as Degrassi: The Next Generation, The Strain, Designated Survivor, and Shadowhunters.

== Acting filmography ==
- The Peanut Butter Solution (1985).... Connie
- Degrassi Junior High (1987) TV Series .... Yick Yu
- Degrassi High (1989) TV Series .... Yick Yu
- Degrassi Talks (1992).... Himself
- School's Out (1992) (TV) .... Yick Yu
- Cagney & Lacey: True Convictions (1996) (TV) .... Delivery Guy
- Degrassi: The Next Generation (2001) TV Series.... Yick Yu
