= Nicole Stoffman =

Canadian actor-singer

- Born: Nicole Freda Stoffman; 16 March 1972 (age 54); Toronto, Ontario, Canada
- Education: York University
- Occupations: Actress, musician
- Years active: 1986–2000
- Known for: Degrassi Junior High

Nicole Freda Stoffman (born March 16, 1972) is a Canadian actress and musician. She is best known for her role as Stephanie Kaye on the television series Degrassi Junior High.

== Life and career ==
Stoffman was born in Toronto, Ontario, the daughter of Judy, an arts journalist, and Daniel Stoffman, an author. She began studying ballet and musical theatre when she was 6 years old.

She is best known for her role as Stephanie Kaye on the television series Degrassi Junior High. She was nominated for a Gemini Award for her portrayal of Stephanie on Degrassi, which she left after two seasons (1986–1988). She appeared in the CTV television series Learning the Ropes in 1988–1989. Her movie credits include The Club (1994), Anchor Zone (1994), and Bram Stoker's Shadowbuilder (1998).

After graduating from Jarvis Collegiate Institute in 1993, she attended McGill University and on and off in film studies at York University. After completing her film degree, she embarked on political studies at the University of Toronto.

Stoffman performed with Jeff Healey's Jazz Wizards as a singer, before forming her own group, Le Jazz Bohème, who performed at several Canadian jazz festivals. In 2011, she worked as a tour guide at the Library of Parliament of Canada.
