= Maureen McKay =

Canadian television former actress (born 1971)

Maureen McKay (born c. 1971) is a Canadian television former actress who played Michelle Accette on Degrassi Junior High and Degrassi High. She starred in a few Degrassi episodes and made a few other television and film appearances, but no longer acts.

She is a 1995 graduate of the University of Toronto and received an LL.B. from Osgoode Hall Law School in 1999. She articled with Pallett Valo, LLP, and is now in solo practice, still in Toronto under the name McKay Legal.
