= Learning the Ropes =

Television series

- Genre: Sitcom
- Created by: Ed Self
- Developed by: George Tricker; Neil Rosen
- Directed by: Alan Erlich
- Starring: Lyle Alzado
- Country of origin: Canada
- Original language: English
- No. of seasons: 1
- No. of episodes: 26

Production
- Executive producer: Charles Falzon
- Producer: M. William Hadley
- Editor: Judi Babcock
- Camera setup: Multi-camera
- Running time: 22–24 minutes
- Production company: Cineplex Odeon Television

Original release
- Network: CTV (Canada); Syndication (United States)
- Release: September 18, 1988 – March 31, 1989

Learning the Ropes is a Canadian-produced sitcom that aired on CTV in Canada and in syndication in the United States from September 1988 to March 1989. The series stars Lyle Alzado as Robert Randall, a teacher who works as a professional wrestler in the evening. Although his children knew about Randall's double life, the family was forced to keep it secret at school. The series featured guest appearances by many wrestlers of the National Wrestling Alliance (NWA). The sitcom was shot in Toronto.

== Synopsis ==
Learning the Ropes follows a single father who works as a private school teacher and vice principal, and also moonlights as a professional wrestler. Robert Randall, played by retired National Football League defensive lineman Lyle Alzado, would balance day to day problems with his students and with his kids Ellen, played by Nicole Stoffman and Mark, portrayed by Yannick Bisson. Randall had an ex-wife who was enrolled in a law school in London, leaving him to raise the children by himself. He worked as a wrestler to help pay his bills, but was forced by his school's principal to keep his second job a secret. Randall's children and the people he worked with at the wrestling shows knew about his teaching job, however. The show also featured the relationship between Randall and Carol Dixon, one of his fellow teachers. Dixon, who was the niece of Principal Whitcomb Mallory, was attracted to Randall and frequently pursued him.

Each episode featured several minutes of footage of National Wrestling Alliance wrestlers competing in the ring, including Ric Flair, Tully Blanchard, Ronnie Garvin, and The Road Warriors. In wrestling segments filmed for the sitcom, Randall's character (known as the rulebreaking "Masked Maniac") was played by real-life wrestler Steve Williams. During the filming of the show, Williams sustained some legitimate injuries, including a blown knee and a cut that required 39 stitches. He has referred to his pay from the show as "the most painful $2,000" that he ever earned. Randall was not a successful wrestler, competing as a jobber to the stars.

The show premiered in October 1988. It ran for one season, totaling 26 episodes. It was created by Ed Self and directed by Alan Erlich. The show's connection to the National Wrestling Alliance allowed for cross-promotion, and Alzado appeared on the NWA's Clash of the Champions II event to discuss and promote the sitcom. It has been inducted on the WrestleCrap website, which bills itself as a collection of the "very worst of pro wrestling".

== Cast ==
- Lyle Alzado as Robert Randall
- Steve Williams (as Steve 'Dr. Death' Williams) as The Masked Maniac
- Yannick Bisson as Mark Randall
- Nicole Stoffman as Ellen Randall
- Cheryl Wilson as Carol Dixon
- Richard W. Farrell as Principal Whitcomb Mallory
- Barry Stevens as Dr. Jerry Larson
- Jacqueline Mahon as Beth
- Gordon Michael Woolvett as Brad
- Grant Cowan as Bertie Baxter
- Jefferson Mappin as Cheetah
- Kevin Rushton as Q Ball

The show would also feature actual wrestlers from the National Wrestling Alliance. In each episode there would be matches involving such wrestling stars as Sting, Lex Luger, Ric Flair, Hawk and Animal of The Road Warriors, Ron Simmons, Dick Murdoch and many more.
