= Kristin Butcher =

Canadian writer (born 1951)

- Born: April 23, 1951 (age 74)
- Occupation: Author
- Language: English, Dutch, French, Slovenian, Spanish, Danish, Korean, Swedish, and German
- Genre: Children's Literature

Website
- kristinbutcher.com

Kristin Butcher is a Canadian writer of young adult and juvenile fiction. Born in Winnipeg, she moved to Victoria, British Columbia, at the age of 5. Her first novel, The Runaways, was published in 1997 and went on to become a regional Silver Birch Award winner. Since then she has published 29 other books, including two biographies for primary readers, a fantasy trilogy for middle grade readers, and ten titles in the Soundings and Currents series from Orca Books, including Zee's Way which won the 2006 Chocolate Lily Award. Butcher won the award again in 2011 with Zach & Zoe Bully and the Beagle.

== Bibliography ==
A list of Kristin Butcher's books:

- The Runaways (1997) -- Translated into Dutch
- The Tomorrow Tunnel (1999)
- The Gramma War (2001)
- Sylvia Stark - Freedom Seeker (2001)
- Marie Rollet Hebert - Canadian Pioneer (2001)
- Summer of Suspense (2002)
- Cairo Kelly and The Mann (2002)
- The Hemingway Tradition (2002)
- The Trouble with Liberty (2003) — Translated into German
- Zee's Way (2004) — Translated into Slovenian and Spanish
- Chat Room (2006)
- Zach & Zoe and the Bank Robber (2008)
- Zach & Zoe Bully and the Beagle (2009)
- Return to Bone Tree Hill (2009)
- Pharaohs & Foot Soldiers (2009) — Translated into Korean
- Zach & Zoe and the River Rescue (2011)
- Cheat (2011) -- Translated into Korean
- The Last Superhero (2010)
- Truths I Learned from Sam (2013)
- Caching In (2013) — Translated into Swedish
- Cabin Girl (2014) -- Translated into Danish
- Alibi (2015)
- In Search of Sam (2015)
- Winter Road (2017)
- Isobel's Stanley Cup (2018)
- Girls Like Me (2019)
- The Druid and the Dragon (2020)
- Bridge of Whispers (2021)
- The Sorcerer's Revenge (2022)
- Closer to Far Away (2024)
