= Neil Hope =

Canadian actor (1972–2007)

- Hope during production of Degrassi Talks in 1991
- Born: Philip Neil Hope; 24 September 1972; Toronto, Ontario, Canada
- Died: c. 25 November 2007 (aged 35); Hamilton, Ontario, Canada
- Education: Etobicoke School of the Arts
- Occupation: Actor
- Years active: 1985–1992, 2001, 2003
- Television: The Kids of Degrassi Street; Degrassi Junior High; Degrassi High
- Partner: Christina Boulard (1998–2001)

Philip Neil Hope (24 September 1972 – 25 November 2007 (Note: Cited Toronto Star report states he was likely dead for more than a week prior to discovery.)), better known and credited as Neil Hope, was a Canadian actor who was best known for portraying Derek "Wheels" Wheeler on the CBC teen drama series Degrassi Junior High and Degrassi High from 1987 to 1991, and Robin "Griff" Griffiths in The Kids of Degrassi Street from 1985 to 1986.

After Degrassi High concluded in 1991, Hope struggled with alcoholism and diabetes, and often lacked money. He kept sporadic contact with his family until 2005. He was found dead in a rooming house on 25 November 2007, with his family and the public unaware of his death until nearly five years later, in early 2012; Hope was 35 at the time of his death.

== Biography ==
=== 1972–1984: Early life ===
Hope was born on 24 September 1972, in Toronto, Ontario, Canada, the fourth son and fifth child of his family. His parents struggled with alcoholism and had an unstable relationship, which led to their separation. He and his siblings often moved back and forth from their mother to their father. Hope had a good relationship with his father, who he felt was supportive and loved him and his siblings.

Hope attended the Etobicoke School of the Arts.

=== 1985–2003: Degrassi ===
Hope often watched television with his father and siblings for dinner, which sparked an interest in television production. He took a television training course, paid for by his father, and had professional promotional photos taken of himself. Hope made his acting debut in The Kids of Degrassi Street episode "Martin Meets The Pirates". Hope told interviewers that television had been an escape from his problems, and being involved in the medium made that escape a reality. Hope played the role of Robin "Griff" Griffiths in The Kids of Degrassi Street from 1985 to 1986. Recalling his audition for Degrassi Street, Schuyler described the "huge vulnerability emanating from Neil's gentle grey eyes, his distinct gravelly voice, and his overall physical appeal".

After Degrassi Street, Hope played the role of Derek "Wheels" Wheeler on the teen drama series Degrassi Junior High and Degrassi High from 1987 to 1991. In his obituary for Hope, Paul Vitello of The New York Times wrote that "all [the series'] characters portrayed teenagers confronting crises over issues like sexual abuse, racism, unwanted pregnancy and AIDS, but the troubles dealt Wheels made him the Job of the cast"; in the series, Wheels' adoptive parents are killed by a drunk driver. He later discovers his biological mother is dead, and that his biological father wants no relationship with him. The character later starts drinking himself, which leads to a drunk driving incident in which he kills a young child; Wheels is incarcerated for manslaughter. He later reprised the role for two episodes of Degrassi: The Next Generation in 2001 and 2003.

In 1992, he also appeared in the series Degrassi Talks, where the series' actors encouraged teens to seek help with problems such as addiction and sexuality.

=== 2004–2007: Final years ===
The original Degrassi series was non-union, and its cast were no longer paid regularly when it ended in the early 1990s, even as the series continued to see success in re-runs and syndication in over 50 countries. Christina Boulard, Hope's ex-fiancée, told media: "It made him so upset that they worked so hard on Degrassi and even years later, a whole new generation was watching it in reruns and the cast wasn't getting a dime." At the time of his death, Hope's only income was a disability cheque.

Hope was described as a drifter in his later years. Cast members had lost touch with him in the years since the end of the series; when a reunion took place on the CBC TV series Jonovision, Hope was absent. When host Jonathan Torrens asked the cast about whether they were still in touch with Hope, all of them admitted they weren't. His family stated that he continued to call and visit occasionally up until 2005.

His final public appearance was in the CTV documentary The Degrassi Story, hosted by co-star Stefan Brogren, who interviewed him in Windsor. Hope later moved to Hamilton, where he stayed at a Salvation Army shelter for two nights in 2006. In early November 2007, Hope visited Cheapies Records & Tapes, a music store in Hamilton that he often frequented. He was wearing an eyepatch and was incoherent. Employee Scott Bell said that it was the last time he saw Hope.

== Personal life and health issues ==
Hope met Christina Boulard when the two both worked at the financial service Money Mart in 1998. His family described him as being at his most happy with Boulard, and he proposed to her in 2000. The marriage was mutually called off in 2001, at which point Hope became more distant from family. Hope was a fan of the Toronto Maple Leafs and Warren Zevon.

His parents both struggled with alcoholism, and he was outspoken on his own problems with drinking. He discussed his parents' alcoholism in an episode of the documentary series Degrassi Talks. Hope also made a documentary called The Darker Side about the children of alcoholic parents, which featured contributions from his co-stars Bill Parrott and Rebecca Haines. Hope's father died in 1987, from complications caused by diabetes and cirrhosis, consequences of his alcohol abuse; Hope found his body in his home kitchen.

In 1994, Hope was also diagnosed with diabetes and required four insulin injections per day. His continued drinking, and neglect of his diabetes contributed to his increasing health problems. He stayed at his brother Danny and sister-in-law Tracy's home in Mississauga for a year; while there, he would often spend days in his room, watching television and drinking beer without eating. This became more frequent throughout the year, and on one occasion, he was found unresponsive because of a diabetic episode. On top of these issues, Hope also suffered from depression.

== Death and aftermath ==
On 25 November 2007, Hope was found dead by his landlord in a rooming house in Hamilton. According to the Toronto Star, Hope was dead for more than a week prior to his discovery, and multiple unused insulin vials were located around his room. His death was ruled as a result of natural causes due to a heart attack.

Hope, whom neither police nor coroner's office officials recognized, was buried, unclaimed, in an unmarked plot in March 2008. A friend of Hope's allegedly told employees at Cheapies of his death, but his family remained unaware. His mother died in 2010.

Hope's family began hearing rumours of his death in 2009 and subsequently contacted Hamilton police, who told them they did not have any matching records. They contacted police once again in January 2012, where it was officially confirmed that Hope had died. The news was first made public by his sister-in-law on a Facebook fan page, before being picked up by Canadian media on 16 February.

== Reaction to Hope's death ==
In 2017, co-star and friend Pat Mastroianni stated: "We had found out three months prior to it being released publicly (in 2012), and the family had asked for privacy for a few months just to allow them to absorb what had happened." He recalled being shocked but "not surprised, because I knew he had a lot of health issues and I know that he didn't really take care of himself that way." He also recalled: "My fond memories of him were not on set, they were not during the filming. It was all the things we did off set, it was all the shenanigans we got up to when we were just hanging out. … We were best friends back in the day, and we did hang out a lot and we did have these little adventures together."

Amanda Stepto, a Degrassi co-star, was reported to have notified Epitome Pictures, the company who produced Degrassi: The Next Generation and held the rights to all previous series, about the news circulating online. Stephen Stohn, Epitome's executive producer, tweeted that the "entire team is very emotional about his passing."

Linda Schuyler, co-creator of the Degrassi franchise, said of Hope in a joint statement with Stohn that he had made an "important contribution" to the lives of the producers, cast members and fans of the show, further adding: "His life was not an easy one but the time he spent with us was a shining example of determination, hard work and hopeful optimism and he is sorely missed."

In her 2022 memoir The Mother Of All Degrassi, Schuyler recalled: "I was gut-wrenched. I couldn't move from the bed for the better part of a week," and added: "My main goal for the Degrassi franchise was to reassure young people that they are not alone; yet, despite my professional intentions and the long-standing friendship that Neil and I shared, he'd died alone. I felt that I had failed him."

American filmmaker Kevin Smith, an avid fan of Degrassi, expressed his condolences on Twitter.

Boulard later announced plans for a memorial service with co-star Amanda Stepto, to take place in May 2012. Hope was later buried with a new gravestone at Woodland Cemetery located in Hamilton, Ontario.

== Filmography ==
=== Television ===
Year	Title	Role	Notes
1985–1986	The Kids of Degrassi Street	Griff	10 episodes
1987–1991	Degrassi High	Derek 'Wheels' Wheeler	Main role
1992	School's Out!	Derek 'Wheels' Wheeler	Television film
1992	Degrassi Talks	Self	6 episodes
2001–2003	Degrassi: The Next Generation	Derek 'Wheels' Wheeler	2 episodes

== Awards and nominations ==
Year	Award	Category	Nominated work	Result	Ref.
1990	Young Artist Awards	Outstanding Young Ensemble Cast	Degrassi High	Nominated	
