= School's Out (1992 film) =

1992 television film based on the Degrassi franchise

- Promotional poster
- Genre: Drama
- Based on: Degrassi by: Linda Schuyler; Kit Hood
- Screenplay by: Yan Moore
- Story by: Yan Moore; Linda Schuyler; Kit Hood
- Directed by: Kit Hood
- Starring: Pat Mastroianni; Stacie Mistysyn; Neil Hope; Stefan Brogren; Kirsten Bourne; Anais Granofsky
- Country of origin: Canada
- Original language: English

Production
- Executive producer: Linda Schuyler
- Producers: Linda Schuyler; Kit Hood
- Cinematography: Philip Earnshaw
- Editor: Robert de Lint
- Running time: 92 minutes
- Production company: Playing With Time, Inc.

Original release
- Network: CBC Television
- Release: January 5, 1992

School's Out (also referred to on home video as Degrassi High: School's Out) is a 1992 Canadian drama television film based on the Degrassi teen drama franchise created by Linda Schuyler and Kit Hood in 1979. It was directed by Hood and written by Yan Moore, based on a story by Moore, Schuyler and Hood. It aired on CBC Television on January 5, 1992, and serves as a finale to the series Degrassi High and its predecessor Degrassi Junior High, which are collectively known as the Degrassi Classic era of the franchise.

The movie, centered on the Degrassi students during their first summer post-graduation, primarily focuses on the relationship between Joey Jeremiah (Pat Mastroianni) and Caitlin Ryan (Stacie Mistysyn); after Caitlin politely rejects Joey's marriage proposal, he begins becoming romantically involved with Tessa Campanelli (Kirsten Bourne), while also still being involved with Caitlin; he has sex with both, with Tessa being first, and brags about it with his friends. Later, Joey's friend Archie "Snake" Simpson (Stefan Brogren), frustrated of his inability to get a girlfriend, ultimately reveals this fact at a party while Caitlin is in the same room, causing her to break the relationship off. Joey and Snake's friend, Derek "Wheels" Wheeler (Neil Hope) starts drinking heavily, resulting in a car crash which kills a two-year-old boy and blinds class valedictorian Lucy Fernandez (Anais Granofsky).

The movie was noted for its inclusion of coarse language and more sexually oriented content as opposed to the television series, including two instances of the word "fuck" during the movie's climax, and a scene depicting how a condom is applied, despite the CBC's refusal to run condom commercials. The film received a positive critical reception after its initial broadcast. In Canada, it drew in 2.3 million viewers, double that of what the preceding series usually received. In 1993, it was nominated for a Gemini Award for Best TV Movie. Despite being intended as a finale, the franchise was rebooted in 2001 with Degrassi: The Next Generation, whose premiere episode primarily centered around the ten-year reunion of the original class.

== Plot ==
It is graduation time for the seniors at Degrassi High, and everyone is making plans for the summer and their future. Most are preparing for university or far-off travel. One who is not is Joey Jeremiah, who is preparing for another year in high school. His girlfriend Caitlin Ryan has taken extra classes and completed high school in three years and has graduated with Joey's former peers.

Eager to hold on to her before she leaves for university to study journalism, Joey proposes to Caitlin at a graduation party hosted by Lucy Fernandez. Caitlin demurs, explaining that she is not ready for that kind of commitment. Joey storms out, only to run into classmate Tessa Campanelli fresh from an argument with her boyfriend Todd, and agrees to give her a ride home.

Arriving at the Campanelli house, Tessa pulls Joey toward her for a kiss. The next day, on a break from the photo shop where she works, Tessa visits Joey next door at the drug store where he works and asks him on a date. Joey, though initially hesitant, accepts Tessa's offer, has a great time, and, as he tells Wheels the next day, gets to "third base." Tessa confides in her co-worker, Spike, the details of the relationship. Spike reminds her that Joey and Caitlin have a pattern of breaking up and reuniting. Tessa rejects Spike's argument, noting that Caitlin will be leaving for university in a matter of weeks anyway. With Caitlin working most evenings and weekends waiting tables at a cafe and Joey working days, they spend little time together and Joey starts seeing Tessa more frequently and they soon go all the way. As the summer goes on, Joey sees both Tessa and Caitlin with neither realizing he is dating them both.

By the middle of August, Tessa discovers she is pregnant and decides to have an abortion. When she realises that Joey is still with Caitlin with no intention of breaking up with her, she dumps him. Joey and Caitlin finally have sex on his nineteenth birthday, approximately a week before Caitlin, Lucy, and Snake are all scheduled to depart for university. It is Caitlin's first time, though she is unaware that it is not Joey's. Unbeknownst to Joey, Caitlin has decided to attend a local university in order to remain close to him.

The next day, at an end of the summer lake house party, hosted by Lucy's boyfriend Bronco, Caitlin accepts Joey's earlier marriage proposal. Joey, who had been teasing Snake all summer about his inability to get a girlfriend, brags once more about his abilities with women. Snake (citing that he's been living through the "summer from hell") finally lashes out at Joey for all the teasing and blurts out about him sleeping with Tessa. Caitlin overhears and confronts Joey about it. She storms out after breaking off their engagement and telling Joey of her would-be plans to study locally in order to be with him. Immediately after unintentionally breaking up Joey and Caitlin, Snake realises that former classmate Allison Hunter is drowning and rushes into the lake to rescue her. Everyone congratulates him for saving her life, but he breaks down in a flood of emotion and anxiety.

Wheels, who had been drinking heavily, leaves the party with Lucy to get more chips but ends up crashing into another car. The crash kills a two-year-old boy in the other car, and seriously injures Lucy and the driver of the other car. The next day, Joey visits Wheels in jail, where Wheels tells him he has been charged with one count of criminal negligence causing death, two counts of criminal negligence causing injury, and drunk driving. He asserts that it was not his fault that the child was not wearing a seatbelt or that Lucy wanted to get more chips. Caitlin visits Lucy at the hospital where she is immobilized and unsure if she will ever see or walk again. Later, Joey stops to see Snake as he prepares to leave for university and asks why he will not accept Wheels' phone calls. Snake is disgusted by Wheels, particularly in light of Wheels having lost his own parents to a drunk driver. He apologizes to Joey for saying what he said at Bronco's place. Joey accepts his apology, saying that Caitlin would have found out sooner or later.

Two months later, most of the gang get together for the wedding of Alexa Pappadopoulos and Simon Dexter. Absent are Wheels, Erica, and Lucy. Wheels, still incarcerated, is planning to plead guilty for his crimes. Erica is teaching abroad in the Dominican Republic and has met a new boyfriend in the process. Meanwhile, Lucy has since regained vision in one of her eyes, but is still not well enough to attend the wedding. Snake is accompanied by his girlfriend Pam whom he met at university and is implied to have finally lost his virginity to her, and he appears considerably more self-assured; he still has yet to get into contact with Wheels. Joey and Snake have an awkward reunion, but make unspecific plans to hang out before he goes back to university. Joey also apologizes for hurting Caitlin, who forgives him, and as Simon and Alexa have their first dance as husband and wife, former fiancés Joey and Caitlin share a dance as friends.

== Cast ==
Main cast

- Pat Mastroianni as Joey Jeremiah
- Stacie Mistysyn as Caitlin Ryan
- Neil Hope as Derek "Wheels" Wheeler
- Stefan Brogren as Archie "Snake" Simpson
- Kirsten Bourne as Tessa Campanelli (credited as Kirsti Bourne)
- Anais Granofsky as Lucy Fernandez

Supporting cast

- L. Dean Ifill as Bronco Davis
- Irene Courakos as Alexa Pappadopoulos
- Michael Carry as Simon Dexter
- Amanda Stepto as Christine "Spike" Nelson
- Sara Holmes as Allison Hunter
- Jacy Hunter as Amy Holmes
- Christian Campbell as Todd
- Andy Chambers as Luke Matthews
- Siluck Saysanasy as Yick Yu
- Arlene Lott as Nancy Kramer
- Keith White as Tim O'Connor
- Aimee Darcel as Sylvia
- Maureen Deiseach as Heather Farrell
- Angela Deiseach as Erica Farrell
- Henry Hwang as Ralph
- Karryn Sheridan as Vicky Friedland
- Michele Johnson-Murray as Tabi
- George Chaker as Nick
- Dayo Ade as Bryant "BLT" Thomas
- Gretchen Halbig as Joey's mom
- Maggie Thomas as Snake's mom
- Angela Bruce as Principal
- Meita Winkler as Councelor
- Jean Walker as Receptionist
- Tara Burt as Pam
- Maureen Burgoyne as Waitress
- Gerry Ride as Jewelry Clerk
- Al Black as Car Salesman
- Darren Marsman as Lucy's dad
- Diana Dragman as Mom at Pool
- Rhys Greenway as Kid at Pool
- Karen Johnson as Teen at Pool
- Anthea Rowe and Melissa Schwartz as Girls at Pool

== Production ==
During development of School's Out, six of Degrassi's actors filmed Degrassi Talks, a six-part non-fiction miniseries in which the actors interviewed teenagers and young adults across Canada about issues explored in the show. Principal photography for School's Out began on July 21, 1991. Yan Moore explained the use of the word "fuck" in the film: "There was a tension growing, especially between Joey and Snake. Snake had this tremendous frustration and the word had never been used in a script before. So, when Snake finally lost it with Joey, the word was included. Since Caitlin overheard the conversation, it just seemed right for her to use that totally un-Caitlin-like word."

== Music ==
The film features eight songs from the debut album of Toronto-based rock group Harem Scarem. After the film aired, Toronto radio station Q-107 received multiple requests to play Harem Scarem's music.

The film also features songs from top Canadian artists including Gowan (the song "Moonlight Desires"), The Box, Spoons, Amy Sky, Images in Vogue and Malcolm Burn.

== Release ==
=== Broadcast ===
School's Out aired on CBC Television at 8:00 p.m. on January 5, 1992. The film drew 2.3 million viewers on the network, doubling the average audience that Degrassi High received. In Australia, the film premiered on ABC TV at 8:30.p.m on May 21, 1993, preceded by an introduction from Afternoon Show host Michael Tunn.

=== Home media ===
School's Out was released on VHS by ABC Video and Roadshow Entertainment in Australia in 1993, and WGBH Boston Home Video in the United States on March 7, 2000. It was later released as part of the Degrassi High: The Complete Collection DVD box set by WGBH on October 9, 2007, and on the Degrassi High Collection set by Force Entertainment in Australia on March 12, 2008.

== Critical reception ==
School's Out received critical praise from the Canadian press on its original broadcast. Writing for the Vancouver Sun, Hester Riches felt that like the preceding series, the movie took risks, but "paid off in typical Degrassi style". Writing for The Canadian Press, Bill Anderson stated that despite the main love triangle plot, "deft subplotting" resulted in a "memorable" end to the film's story, and that the movie put "a brilliant cap" on the "honest, compelling" tradition that the Degrassi shows had created. Riches, along with columnist Janice Kennedy, both noted the inclusion of a scene of Lucy Fernandez showing Caitlin Ryan how to put a condom on a banana, despite CBC's refusal to run advertisements about condoms. Writing for Fashion magazine in the wake of the movie's 25th anniversary, Lesa Hannah called it "a truly iconic piece of Canadiana". Australian film critic Adrian Martin, a fan of the TV series, gave the film a mixed to negative review, feeling that the movie was "a little disappointing" and a departure from the "daggy everydayness" typical of the shows, and pointed out a "punishing sense of morality" exemplified by the catastrophic events experienced by several of its characters. Writing for the Sydney Morning Herald, Alison Stewart praised the film and called it "much more real television" than its American counterpart Beverly Hills, 90210.

Amanda Stepto, who played Spike, was critical of the film, calling it "too adult" and "not a very good send off". In a 2019 podcast interview, when asked about the film, Stepto responded; "Fuckin' hate that!". She noted how she had requested to be included in the film's party scene but ultimately did not, and questioned why character Tessa Campanelli, who played a minor role in the series, was given a lead role. The movie was nominated for a Gemini Award for Best TV Movie in 1993, the same year that Degrassi Talks was nominated for Best Youth Program Or Series.
