= Anais Granofsky =

Actress, director, screenwriter

- Born: July 14, 1973 (age 52); Springfield, Ohio
- Other name: Anais Granovsky
- Occupations: Actress; Director; Screenwriter
- Years active: 1982–present

Anais Granofsky (born July 14, 1973) is an American-born Canadian actress, screenwriter, producer and director, who is best known for playing the role of Lucy Fernandez in the Degrassi television franchise, appearing as a main character in Degrassi Junior High (1987–1989) and Degrassi High (1989–1991). She reprised the role in four episodes of Degrassi: The Next Generation (2001–2002).

== Early life ==
Granofsky was born in Springfield, Ohio, to an African American mother and a Canadian father descended from Jews who were originally from Russia and Poland. Her paternal Russian-Jewish great-grandparents fled to Romania in 1920 after an aunt was murdered by the Bolsheviks, having bribed a border guard. Granofsky's family later immigrated to Toronto in 1927. Her paternal grandfather is industrialist Phil Granovsky.

== Career ==
Anais began her career as a child actor in 1985 playing Sophie of the Mighty Mites on "Owl TV". After, she was cast in the Canadian children's television series: The Kids of Degrassi Street.

From 1987 to 1991, Granofsky portrayed Lucy Fernandez in both Degrassi Junior High and Degrassi High. She also appeared in the 1992 series finale television movie School's Out. Granofsky has since made guest appearances in television series including Counterstrike (1992), Forever Knight (1995), and Goosebumps (1996).

After Degrassi, she moved to New York to attend film school at NYU, then returned to Toronto where she acted in film and TV for the next decade. In 1997, she co-starred in the short-lived series Fast Track, starring Keith Carradine. She had recurring roles on La Femme Nikita and Soul Food.

In addition to acting, Granofsky has written and directed several films including On Their Knees (in which she also starred) and The Limb Salesman. Granofsky and Canadian filmmaker/co-star Ingrid Veninger both appear fully nude in a scene in On Their Knees. Granofsky exposes her vulva and pubic hair in the aforementioned scene, making her one of the few filmmakers to have directed herself in a full-frontal nude scene.

She has directed episodes of Degrassi: The Next Generation, Bliss and Da Kink in My Hair.

== Personal life ==
Granofsky is married to husband, Craig, and has three children, including basketball player Toby Fournier.

== Filmography ==
=== Film ===
Anais Granofsky film credits
Year	Title	Role	Notes	Ref.
1991	Deceived	Ellen		
1998	The White Raven	Jill		
1999	Three to Tango	Amy's Girlfriend #4		
1999	Have Mercy	—N/a	Director, writer	
2001	Invitation	Anais		
2001	On Their Knees	Willie Walker	Director, writer	
2004	The Limb Salesman	—N/a	Director, producer, writer	

=== Television ===
Anais Granofsky television credits
Year	Title	Role	Notes	Ref.
1985	Owl Tv	Sophie Mite	1 episode	
1985–1986	The Kids of Degrassi Street	Karen Gillis	6 episodes	
1987–1991	Degrassi Junior High	Lucy Fernandez	Main role	
1989	My Secret Identity	Nina	1 episode	
1992	School's Out	Lucy Fernandez	TV movie	
1992	Counterstrike	Hospital Clerk	Episode: "D.O.A."	
1995	Forever Knight	Nurse	1 episode	
1996	Goosebumps	Ms. Prince	1 episode	
1996	We the Jury	Naomi Budden	rowspan=2TV movie	
1996	Rebound: The Legend of Earl "The Goat" Manigault	E.R. Technician		
1997–1998	Fast Track	Vanessa Carter	Main role	
1997–1998	La Femme Nikita	Carla	Recurring role	
1999	Mind Prey	Ice	TV movie	
1999	Twice in a Lifetime	Isabel Sanchez	1 episode	
2000	The Loretta Claiborne Story	Alice	TV movie	
2001–2002	Soul Food	Christine Hughes	Recurring role	
2001–2003	Degrassi: The Next Generation	Lucy Fernandez	4 episodes	
2003	Bliss	—N/a	Director, 1 episode	
2009	Da Kink in My Hair	—N/a	Director, 2 episodes	
