= Degrassi season 11 =

Degrassi
- Season 11
- Complete Season 11 DVD cover
- Showrunner: Brendon Yorke
- No. of episodes: 45

Release
- Original network: MuchMusic (Canada); TeenNick (United States)
- Original release: July 18, 2011 – May 18, 2012

Season chronology
- ← Previous; Season 10 Next → Season 12

The eleventh season of the Canadian teen drama television series Degrassi, formerly known as Degrassi: The Next Generation, premiered on July 18, 2011, concluded on May 18, 2012, and consists of 45 episodes. Although only three school years have passed in the story timeline since season six, part one of season eleven is set in the final term of the Spring semester, while part two is set in the fall semester to the first term of the winter semester in the years it aired. Writers used a semi-floating timeline, so that the issues depicted were modern for their viewers. The first half of this season again depicts the lives of a group of high school sophomores, juniors, and seniors while the second half of this season depicts the lives of a group of high school freshmen, juniors, and seniors as they deal with some of the challenges and issues that teenagers face such as gang violence, parenthood, transphobia, homosexuality, drug use, dysfunctional families, mental disorders, adoption, organ transplantation, crime, bulimia, alcoholism, sex, drug abuse, and murder.

45 episodes were ordered for this season, and it continues the telenovela/soap opera format that began in season 10, with the show airing new episodes four days a week, for the first 7 weeks. Production for the season began on March 14, 2011, at Epitome Pictures' studios in Toronto, Ontario. In the US, The first 29 episodes (part 1) were promoted as Degrassi: Now or Never, while the last 15 episodes (part 2) were promoted as Degrassi: New Beginnings.

== Cast ==
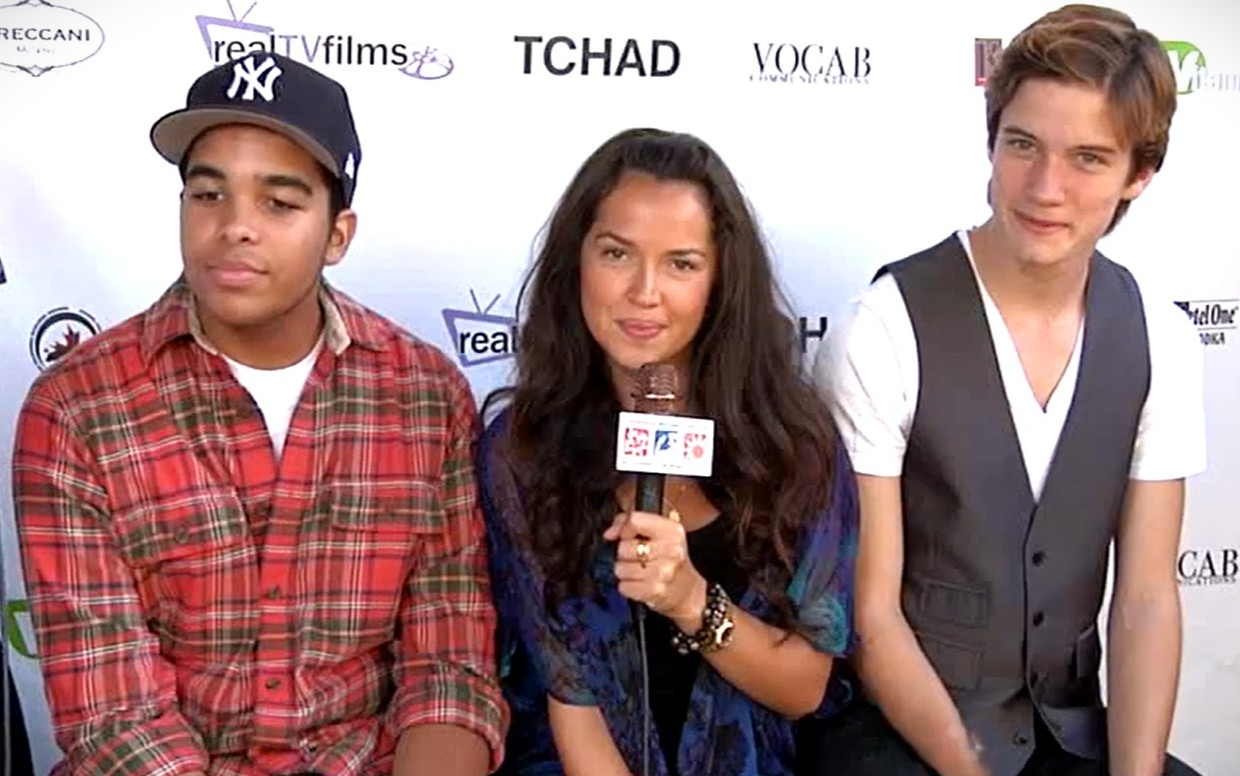
Degrassi cast in 2011, from left: A.J. Saudin, Tamara Duarte, Justin Kelly

For the first half of the eleventh season, twenty-five actors receive star billing, with twenty-one of them returning from the previous season. Joining the main cast are Justin Kelly (Jake), Shanice Banton (Marisol), Chloe Rose (Katie) and Cristine Prosperi (Imogen), replacing Landon Liboiron (Declan). Midway through the season, Lyle O'Donohoe (Tristan), Olivia Scriven (Maya), Alex Steele (Tori), Ricardo Hoyos (Zig) and Jacob Neayem (Mo) join the cast, replacing Samantha Munro (Anya), Charlotte Arnold (Holly J), Jajube Mandiela (Chantay), Shannon Kook-Chun (Zane), Argiris Karras (Riley) and Raymond Ablack (Sav).

=== Main cast ===
- Jordan Todosey as Adam Torres (25 episodes)
- Justin Kelly as Jake Martin (26 episodes)
- Melinda Shankar as Alli Bhandari (28 episodes)
- Aislinn Paul as Clare Edwards (29 episodes)
- Samantha Munro as Anya MacPherson (Note: Appears in the opening credits from episodes 1–29 only.) (12 episodes)
- Charlotte Arnold as Holly J. Sinclair (19 episodes)
- Jajube Mandiela as Chantay Black (7 episodes)
- Sam Earle as K.C. Guthrie (19 episodes)
- Jessica Tyler as Jenna Middleton (23 episodes)
- Shanice Banton as Marisol Lewis (30 episodes)
- Chloe Rose as Katie Matlin (26 episodes)
- Cristine Prosperi as Imogen Moreno (21 episodes)
- Munro Chambers as Eli Goldsworthy (27 episodes)
- Annie Clark as Fiona Coyne (32 episodes)
- Shannon Kook-Chun as Zane Park (5 episodes)
- Argiris Karras as Riley Stavros (9 episodes)
- A.J. Saudin as Connor DeLaurier (15 episodes)
- Spencer Van Wyck as Wesley Betenkamp (8 episodes)
- Raymond Ablack as Savtaj "Sav" Bhandari (13 episodes)
- Cory Lee as Ms. Oh (16 episodes)
- Stefan Brogren as Archie "Snake" Simpson (14 episodes)
- Alicia Josipovic as Bianca DeSousa (15 episodes)
- Daniel Kelly as Owen Milligan (18 episodes)
- Jahmil French as Dave Turner (28 episodes)
- Luke Bilyk as Drew Torres (26 episodes)
- Lyle O'Donohoe as Tristan Milligan (Note: Appears in the opening credits from episodes 30–45 only.) (9 episodes)
- Olivia Scriven as Maya Matlin (10 episodes)
- Alex Steele as Tori Santamaria (10 episodes)
- Ricardo Hoyos as Zigmund "Zig" Novak (8 episodes)
- Jacob Neayem as Mohammed "Mo" Mashkour (13 episodes)

Cast notes

== Crew ==
Season eleven was produced by Epitome Pictures in association with Bell Media. Funding was provided by The Canadian Media Fund, RBC Royal Bank, The Shaw Rocket Fund, The Independent Production Fund: Mountain Cable Program, The Canadian Film or Video Production Tax Credit, and the Ontario Film and Television Tax Credit.

Linda Schuyler, co-creator of the Degrassi franchise and CEO of Epitome Pictures, served as an executive producer with her husband, and President of Epitome Pictures, Stephen Stohn. Brendon Yorke is also credited as an executive producer, and Sarah Glinski is credited as a co-executive producer. Stefan Brogren was series producer, while David Lowe is credited as producer, and Stephanie Williams the supervising producer. The casting director is Stephanie Gorin, and the editors are Jason B. Irvine, Gordon Thorne, and Paul Whitehead.

The executive story editors are Duana Taha and Matt Huether, the story editors are Cole Bastedo, Michael Grassi, and Ramona Barckert, and Lauren Gosnell is the story coordinator. Episode writers for the season are Ramona Barckert, Cole Bastedo, Sarah Glinski, Lauren Gosnell, Michael Grassi, Matt Huether, James Hurst, Shelley Scarrow, Duana Taha, and Brendon Yorke. The directors of photography are Alwyn Kumst, Mitchell T. Ness and John Berrie, and the directors are Stefan Brogren, Phil Earnshaw, Sturla Gunnarsson, Eleanore Lindo, Farhad Mann, Samir Rehem, and Pat Williams.

== Reception ==
Degrassi was nominated for a GLAAD Media Award in the Best Drama Series category, alongside Pretty Little Liars, Shameless, Torchwood: Miracle Day, and winner Grey's Anatomy. These awards, honour works that fairly and accurately represent the LGBT community and issues. At the 2012 Young Artist Awards, both Cristine Prosperi and A.J. Saudin won awards in the Lead Young Actress and Recurring Young Actor in the Best Performance in a TV Series categories respectively, both sharing with another in their category due to ties. It also received a nomination for a Primetime Emmy Award in the outstanding children's program category, alongside Good Luck Charlie, iCarly, Victorious, and winner Wizards of Waverly Place. At the 1st Canadian Screen Awards Degrassi won the award for "Best Children's or Youth Fiction Program or Series". In addition, Charlotte Arnold and Jahmil French were both nominated for "Best Performance in a Children's or Youth Program or Series" for their performances in "U Don't Know" Part Two and "Smash into You" respectively, also nominated were two performances from season 12, and winner, and fellow Degrassi actress, Melinda Shankar for her performance in How to be Indie.

== Episodes ==
The first 29 episodes ran in July to September 2011 for a total of seven weeks. This season again aired episodes on the same nights in Canada and the United States. The summer season began with a two-episode premiere, and an hour-long special aired between the summer and winter seasons. This season continued the tradition from season 10, that saw the opening credits revised halfway through the season to reflect the changing cast. The last 15 episodes ran from February to May 2012.

No. overall	No. in season	Title	Canada airdate	U.S. airdate	Prod. code
233–234	1–2	"Boom Boom Pow"	July 18, 2011	July 18, 2011	1101 & 1102
It's spring break, and despite his mother's warnings, Drew continues to see Bianca; later at a concert, they find themselves in the sort of trouble that changes their lives forever. Meanwhile, Fiona decides to take an art class with Holly J. where she meets a sexy model. Sav is still heartbroken when he runs into Keke Palmer. Special Guest Star: Keke Palmer Note: Aired as a one-hour special titled "Spring Fever" in the US, this was filmed at the end of season 10 in 2010.
235	3	"Love Game"	July 19, 2011	July 19, 2011	1103
Clare is worried that Eli is taking their break-up too calmly but there's also the question of new guy Jake Martin whom her mom wants her to befriend. Meanwhile, Jenna is dealing with the demands of new motherhood and feels that KC isn't contributing his fair share of help.
236	4	"What's My Age Again?"	July 20, 2011	July 20, 2011	1104
Anya's 18th birthday is coming up which means she can finally date Dr. Chris, but her world soon starts crashing down as she gets bad news from every corner. Meanwhile, Drew worries about Vince coming after him and reflects on his relationship with Bianca. Also, K.C. grows tired of his parental responsibilities and vies for a way out. And due to his Asperger syndrome, Connor begins to grow curious about girls in inappropriate ways.
237	5	"Idioteque"	July 21, 2011	July 21, 2011	1105
Drew is paranoid over the fact that Vince and his gang are coming after him and comes to the conclusion that all of his problems are connected to Bianca. Meanwhile, Anya grows worried about people finding that she had sex with Owen. Also, Connor continues to steal women's underwear.
238	6	"Cry Me a River" Part One	July 25, 2011	July 25, 2011	1106
Dave and Adam vie for a position on the school's radio system and realize that they make a good team, but Dave soon has problems with Adam being transgender. Meanwhile, ready for a semester devoid of boy drama, Clare wants to join the school newspaper. Also Fiona has trouble making friends in an eleventh-grade drama class.
239	7	"Cry Me a River" Part Two	July 26, 2011	July 26, 2011	1107
Dave receives backlash from the student body due to his insensitive comments, but instead of helping him, the censorship and persecution drive him further into intolerance. Meanwhile, Clare continues to harass a stubborn Katie for a position on the newspaper. Also, Fiona continues her attempts at reaching out to a distant Charlie.
240	8	"Dirt Off Your Shoulder" Part One	July 27, 2011	July 27, 2011	1108
Eli faces the enormous pressure of writing the school play when he encounters writer's block. Meanwhile, Riley is relieved when his mother begins talking to him again but grows upset when he finds out her intent. Also, K.C. picks up another shift at work and spends time with Marisol.
241	9	"Dirt Off Your Shoulder" Part Two	July 28, 2011	July 28, 2011	1109
Eli receives help in writing the play from the outlandish Imogen, who encourages him to quit his anti-anxiety medication. Meanwhile, Riley realizes that neither his family nor Zane is going to change and must make a difficult decision. Also, the flirtation between K.C. and Marisol continues to grow, which worries Jenna.
242	10	"Paper Planes" Part One	August 1, 2011	August 1, 2011	1110
When Anya begins to feel pressure to telling her parents that she didn't get into college and into choosing between Holly J. and Owen, she decides to experiment with cocaine. Meanwhile, Fiona discovers bed bugs in her loft and assumes it is from her new roommate Charlie. Also, Connor claims his underwear fetish is over and focuses on a contest.
243	11	"Paper Planes" Part Two	August 2, 2011	August 2, 2011	1111
Anya grows increasingly worried about her college interview while the urge to do more cocaine becomes stronger. Meanwhile, after the whole bed bug incident, Fiona struggles to tell Charlie that she is a recovering alcoholic. Also, Alli, Wesley, and Hannah come together to put an end to Connor's obsession.
244	12	"Should've Said No" Part One	August 3, 2011	August 3, 2011	1112
Clare's hormones begin raging when a shirtless Jake helps his father with renovations at her house. Meanwhile, after returning to Degrassi, Drew begins to suffer from posttraumatic stress disorder while trying to get used to things. Also, Dave tries to convince himself that it is ok to be friends with Alli.
245	13	"Should've Said No" Part Two	August 4, 2011	August 4, 2011	1113
Clare discovers a shocking secret about her parents' divorce that causes her to question her casual relationship with Jake. Meanwhile, Drew thinks the only way to escape his constant terror is to leave Degrassi, which upsets Adam. Also, Dave's feelings for Alli intensify, which doesn't sit well with his girlfriend Sadie.
246	14	"U Don't Know" Part One	August 8, 2011	August 8, 2011	1114
Holly J.'s health is getting worse, leading her to look for a kidney donor within her family. But in the process, she gets the shock of a lifetime. Meanwhile, Adam is attracted to Katie and thinks she may be reciprocating this feeling. Also, Imogen wants to play the role of "Clara" in the school play and begins shadowing Clare. Note: Aired as "Rock Your Body, Part 1" in the United States.
247	15	"U Don't Know" Part Two	August 9, 2011	August 9, 2011	1115
Holly J. tracks down her birth mother but struggles in mustering up the courage to ask her to be a kidney donor. Meanwhile, Adam worries that Katie is not attracted to him because of his growing breasts and contemplates chest reconstruction. Also, Imogen attempts to make Eli her boyfriend. Note: Aired as "Rock Your Body, Part 2" in the United States.
248	16	"Lose Yourself" Part One	August 10, 2011	August 10, 2011	1116
Jenna wants desperately to come back to Degrassi but doesn't have enough money for child care. Meanwhile, Sav, who has a crush on Ms. Oh, competes to write the score for the school play. When Clare finds out Eli has hired Jake to construct sets, she worries Eli is out to harm Jake.
249	17	"Lose Yourself" Part Two	August 11, 2011	August 11, 2011	1117
Following Tyson's accident, Jenna and K.C. expect a visit from Child Protective Services. When Jenna finds out about K.C.'s infidelity, they begin to wonder if they are ready to be parents. Meanwhile, Mo helps Sav with his crush on Ms. Oh. Also, Clare attempts to keep Jake safe from Eli.
250	18	"Mr. Brightside" Part One	August 15, 2011	August 15, 2011	1118
Drew's mixed martial arts training is the only thing keeping him together, but when a school exposé forces him to quit, he is left stranded without his remedy. Meanwhile, Alli tries to make Dave the perfect boyfriend before she presents him to her family. Also, Holly J. finds out exchanging money for organs is illegal.
251	19	"Mr. Brightside" Part Two	August 16, 2011	August 16, 2011	1119
Drew tries to find other ways to cope with his fear and joins the school newspaper until he finds out about an underground MMA fighting ring. Meanwhile, Alli talks to Dave, and they agree to start over and introduce Dave to her parents as her boyfriend. Also, Holly J. continues regular meetings with her birth mother.
252	20	"Extraordinary Machine" Part One	August 17, 2011	August 17, 2011	1120
Eli is off his medication and unstable. He is convinced that he can use the play to repair his relationship with Clare. Meanwhile, K.C. and Jenna prepare to interview a couple who wants to adopt Tyson. Also, Anya, still rebellious and without any post-graduation plans, jeopardizes her relationship with Owen due to her constant drug use.
253	21	"Extraordinary Machine" Part Two	August 18, 2011	August 18, 2011	1121
Eli has met his match in Imogen, who is someone just as willing to go to extraordinary and highly questionable lengths to get what she wants. Meanwhile, Anya has her mind set on joining the Canadian Air Force, but her drug use may ruin her one chance of getting in. Also, K.C. realizes he must do what's best for the people he loves.
254	22	"Drop It Like It's Hot" Part One	August 22, 2011	August 22, 2011	1122
Alli needs to break the news about her summer program to Dave sooner or later, so she plans a special night for them. Meanwhile, Wesley is threatened by another male student when he joins him and his girlfriend in a science project. Also, Bianca is threatened by Vince into peddling drugs at Degrassi. Note: Aired as "(If You're Wondering If I Want You To) I Want You To, Part 1" in the United States.
255	23	"Drop It Like It's Hot" Part Two	August 23, 2011	August 23, 2011	1123
Alli finds an underground poker group and becomes addicted. She begins gambling her relationship with Dave--and her future. Meanwhile, Wesley digs himself in too deep with his lie about being able to drive, which could ruin Hannah's trust in him. Also, Bianca's side job could ruin her newly built friendship with Imogen. Note: This episode marks the final appearance of Spencer Van Wyck as Wesley Betenkamp. Aired as "(If You're Wondering If I Want You To) I Want You To, Part 2" in the United States.
256	24	"Don't Panic" Part One	August 24, 2011	August 24, 2011	1124
While running for student council president, Katie keeps her relationship with Drew a secret from long time friend Marisol, who also harbors a crush on Drew. After being diagnosed with Bipolar disorder, Eli attempts to apologize to the people he's hurt. Sav and Ms. Oh flirt over music.
257	25	"Don't Panic" Part Two	August 25, 2011	August 25, 2011	1125
Student council candidates Katie and Marisol are in an all-out war as rumors about Katie's bulimia begin to circulate around Degrassi. Meanwhile, Eli desperately tries to get Jake and Clare to confess their love for each other. Sav and Ms. Oh's secret relationship puts her job in danger when rumors begin flying.
258	26	"Take a Bow" Part One	August 29, 2011	August 29, 2011	1126
After Holly J. and Anya get dates to prom, a lonely Fiona decides to ask her ex-girlfriend Charlie, which could be detrimental to her sobriety. Meanwhile, Anya is accepted into the army and begins physical training with her ex-boyfriend Owen. Also, Katie assumes that prom night with Drew will lead to sex and begins preparations.
259	27	"Take a Bow" Part Two	August 30, 2011	August 30, 2011	1127
As Graduation Day arrives, Fiona has to face her demons when her loneliness and guilt over her relapse, which forces her to push her loved ones away. Meanwhile, after being dumped before prom, Riley makes the decision to come out to his mother again. Also, Katie realizes that she isn't quite ready to take the next step with Drew. Note: This episode marks the final appearance of Jajube Mandiela as Chantay Black.
260	28	"Dead & Gone" Part One	August 31, 2011	August 31, 2011	1128
Drew is cautious when Bianca and Vince encroach on his space. Clare and Jake are left reeling after a surprise announcement from their parents. Now that school year is over, Sav tries to score some alone time with Ms. Oh.
261	29	"Dead & Gone" Part Two	September 1, 2011	September 1, 2011	1129
It's prom night at Degrassi, and with the future looming around the corner for some, The students will have a night filled with tough choices, scores from the past, and taking new risks. But when an unexpected visitor arrives, the evening becomes challenging for more than just their relationships, and a few unlucky students get caught in the crossfire of this deadly encounter. Note: This episode marks the final appearances of Argiris Karras as Riley Stavros, Samantha Munro as Anya MacPherson, and Shannon Kook-Chun as Zane Park.
Part 2
262–263	30–31	"Nowhere to Run"	October 24, 2011	November 18, 2011	1130 & 1131
The Degrassi students return from the summer break a week before the new school year. Meanwhile, Jake and Clare are still not talking, and the arrival of their parents' wedding sends Jake looking for some space away from her. He invites Katie, Drew, Marisol and Alli to his family's remote cabin in the woods. Also, Katie is concerned that Bianca has been spending too much time with Drew, and after finding some weed, she gets high with Marisol. And after Dave breaks her heart, Alli commits a betrayal that could end her friendship with Clare for good, and creepy things begin to happen around the cabin that scare them all. Note: This is a horror-themed one-hour special, and airs as "Bleeding Love" in half-hour syndication.
264	32	"Underneath It All" Part One	February 24, 2012	February 20, 2012	1132
It's the start to another school year at Degrassi, Fiona is ready for a fresh start and has to navigate Degrassi without Holly J, but finds out she has a reputation with the younger students. Meanwhile, Clare and Jake's secret relationship grows which leads to a huge question. New students, Maya, and Tori, Zig, Tristan move into the school.
265	33	"Underneath It All" Part Two	February 24, 2012	February 24, 2012	1133
After letting Imogen take the blame for the senior prank, Fiona's guilt opens her eyes to the kind of people Katie and Marisol really are. Meanwhile, when Clare tells Jake she is ready to have sex, Jake begins to worry about the commitment he is making. Maya decides to help Tori find closure to her broken relationship with her ex-boyfriend Zig.
266	34	"Can't Tell Me Nothing" Part One	March 2, 2012	March 2, 2012	1134
After injuring her knee at the National Soccer Team tryouts, Katie searches for a quick fix that will allow her to play through the pain. Meanwhile, Jenna is still reeling from her break-up with K.C. and decides to pour all of her emotions into her songs. Also, Tristan feels like Zig is taking Tori away from him.
267	35	"Can't Tell Me Nothing" Part Two	March 9, 2012	March 9, 2012	1135
With soccer tryouts and the new event to plan at Degrassi, Katie pushes her limit and continues taking her mother's codeine, which has disastrous results. Meanwhile, after K.C. overhears Jenna's song about him, he writes a poem making Jenna's character a monster. Also, Tori, Tristan, and Zig decide to make their own musical act, but they can't see eye-to-eye.
268	36	"Not Ready to Make Nice" Part One	March 16, 2012	March 16, 2012	1136
Clare realizes that she can't be around Jake after he invites Jenna to his birthday supper and opts for other living arrangements. Meanwhile, Connor makes it onto the football team but has trouble fitting in, especially with Mo. Also, when Fiona realizes she has feelings for Imogen, she attempts to get Imogen and Eli together.
269	37	"Not Ready to Make Nice" Part Two	March 23, 2012	March 23, 2012	1137
Clare continues to find comfort in the group of friends with whom she has found a home, as they encourage her away from her past life. She later finds out that she is living with very dangerous people. Meanwhile, Connor plays a prank on Mo in order to make him skip a football game. Also, Fiona puts her plan in motion.
270	38	"Need You Now" Part One	March 30, 2012	March 30, 2012	1138
Eli feels like his bipolar disorder is under control as his relationship with Imogen grows. When Imogen shows Eli her mural about mental illness featuring his portrait, he lashes out at her. Meanwhile, when Tyson's adoptive parents invite K.C. and Jenna to his christening, K.C. decides to be in his son's life. Also, Tori joins the power squad but struggles in balancing practice and being a good girlfriend to Zig.
271	39	"Need You Now" Part Two	April 6, 2012	April 6, 2012	1139
Eli catches Imogen in a lie and thinks she must be cheating on him and becomes obsessed with finding out the truth. Meanwhile, KC has trouble dealing with the fact that Tyson has a new life that doesn't involve him. Also, after an angry Marisol makes her the mascot, Tori realizes that Zig doesn't put any effort into their relationship.
272	40	"Smash Into You" Part One	April 13, 2012	April 13, 2012	1140
Desperate to get Alli back, Dave volunteers to help her organize the Model UN. When Dave's summer fling, Jacinta, tries to reconnect with him, he decides to remove all connection with her. Meanwhile, Marisol is stuck with Mo as a partner for Model UN. Also, Adam receives a note from a secret admirer and assumes it's a prank.
273	41	"Smash Into You" Part Two	April 20, 2012	April 20, 2012	1141
When Jacinta ignores Dave's rejection, he comes up with a plan to get her out of his life and unknowingly puts her life in jeopardy. Meanwhile, Marisol thinks Mo is developing a crush on her and decides to put a stop to it. Also, Adam is mortified when he finds out who his secret admirer is.
274	42	"Hollaback Girl" Part One	April 27, 2012	April 27, 2012	1142
Bianca has turned her life around completely and looks into colleges. With Drew's help, she befriends Katie, who is only using her for her drug connections. Meanwhile, Alli tries to figure out how to get Dave to open up about the accident when he shuts down and refuses to talk to her. Marisol is embarrassed about being seen with Mo, while he is nervous to create the perfect date.
275	43	"Hollaback Girl" Part Two	May 4, 2012	May 4, 2012	1143
Bianca considers putting her relationship with Drew on hold when Katie is hospitalized after overdosing and is taken out of school to attend rehab. Meanwhile, Dave obsesses over what others are saying about him online, worrying Alli. Also, Marisol separates herself from Mo, and Mo takes pictures of himself with strippers, hoping to improve his image.
276	44	"In the Cold, Cold Night" Part One	May 11, 2012	May 11, 2012	1144
With Katie gone, Fiona and Imogen scheme to end Marisol's reign as president by throwing an end-of-semester holiday carnival. Meanwhile, Fiona finds out her mother is in legal trouble and that their assets have been frozen. Also, Clare agrees to put together a school newspaper in a week, meaning she has to reconcile with old friends. And Maya, an expert cellist, has trouble fitting in with the Grade 9 band.
277	45	"In the Cold, Cold Night" Part Two	May 18, 2012	May 18, 2012	1145
Fiona is upset over having to leave Degrassi on top of dealing with funding for the expensive carnival and her growing feelings for Imogen. Meanwhile, with the clock ticking on the deadline for the newspaper, Clare has to confront her feelings for Eli head on when he wants to get back together with her. Also, desperately searching for a challenge, Maya considers auditioning for a band at a bar.

== DVD releases ==
Season 11, Part 1
Set details	Special features
29 episodes; 2-disc set; 1.78:1 aspect ratio	"Meet the New Kids"; "The Gallery Shoot"; Set Tour, Parking Lot Tour; "From Rehearsal to Shooting"; "Goodbyes"; Deleted scenes; Bloopers
Release dates	"Meet the New Kids"; "The Gallery Shoot"; Set Tour, Parking Lot Tour; "From Rehearsal to Shooting"; "Goodbyes"; Deleted scenes; Bloopers
(Canada) (United States) Region 1	"Meet the New Kids"; "The Gallery Shoot"; Set Tour, Parking Lot Tour; "From Rehearsal to Shooting"; "Goodbyes"; Deleted scenes; Bloopers
May 29, 2012	"Meet the New Kids"; "The Gallery Shoot"; Set Tour, Parking Lot Tour; "From Rehearsal to Shooting"; "Goodbyes"; Deleted scenes; Bloopers

Season 11, Part 2
Set details	Special features
16 episodes; 2-disc set; 1.78:1 aspect ratio	Behind the Scenes; Bloopers; Deleted Scenes; Webisodes
Release dates	Behind the Scenes; Bloopers; Deleted Scenes; Webisodes
(Canada) (United States) Region 1	Behind the Scenes; Bloopers; Deleted Scenes; Webisodes
October 16, 2012	Behind the Scenes; Bloopers; Deleted Scenes; Webisodes

Complete 11th Season
Set details	Special features
45 episodes; 4-disc set; 1.78:1 aspect ratio	"Meet the New Kids"; "The Gallery Shoot"; Set Tour, Parking Lot Tour; "From Rehearsal to Shooting"; "Goodbyes"; Behind the scenes; Deleted scenes; Bloopers; Webisodes
Release dates	"Meet the New Kids"; "The Gallery Shoot"; Set Tour, Parking Lot Tour; "From Rehearsal to Shooting"; "Goodbyes"; Behind the scenes; Deleted scenes; Bloopers; Webisodes
(Canada) (United States) Region 1	"Meet the New Kids"; "The Gallery Shoot"; Set Tour, Parking Lot Tour; "From Rehearsal to Shooting"; "Goodbyes"; Behind the scenes; Deleted scenes; Bloopers; Webisodes
December 3, 2013	"Meet the New Kids"; "The Gallery Shoot"; Set Tour, Parking Lot Tour; "From Rehearsal to Shooting"; "Goodbyes"; Behind the scenes; Deleted scenes; Bloopers; Webisodes
