= Degrassi season 12 =

Degrassi
- Season 12
- Degrassi Season 12 DVD
- Showrunner: Sarah Glinski
- No. of episodes: 40

Release
- Original network: MuchMusic (Canada); TeenNick (United States)
- Original release: July 16, 2012 – June 21, 2013

Season chronology
- ← Previous; Season 11 Next → Season 13

The twelfth season of the Canadian teen drama television series Degrassi, formerly known as Degrassi: The Next Generation, premiered on July 16, 2012, concluded on June 21, 2013, and consists of 40 episodes. Although only three school years have passed in the story timeline since season six, season twelve is set in the spring semester in the years it aired. Writers have been able to use a semi-floating timeline, so that the issues depicted are modern for their viewers. This season again depicts the lives of a group of high school freshmen, sophomores, juniors, and seniors as they deal with some of the challenges and issues that teenagers face such as homophobia, theft, religion, sexual harassment, dysfunctional families, peer pressure, pregnancy scares, stress, self image, self-injury, suicide, drug use, burglary, parenthood, depression, grief and relationships.

This season continues the telenovela/soap opera format that began in season 10, with new episodes premiering four days a week, for the first five weeks. MuchMusic announced renewing the series for a twelfth season in June 2011. The series' American broadcaster, TeenNick, announced a summer run, following the season 11 finale. Production for the season began on February 27, 2012, at Epitome Pictures' studios in Toronto, Ontario. The first 20 episodes were promoted as Degrassi Showdown.

== Cast ==
The twelfth season has twenty-seven actors receiving star billing with twenty-three of them returning from the previous season. Joining the main cast are Sarah Fisher (Becky), Craig Arnold (Luke), Demetrius Joyette (Dallas) and Dylan Everett (Campbell), replacing Spencer Van Wyck (Wesley).

=== Main cast ===
- Jahmil French as Dave Turner (24 episodes)
- Jacob Neayem as Mo Mashkour (24 episodes)
- Shanice Banton as Marisol Lewis (24 episodes)
- Justin Kelly as Jake Martin (24 episodes)
- Chloe Rose as Katie Matlin (26 episodes)
- Stefan Brogren as Archie "Snake" Simpson (13 episodes)
- Lyle O'Donohoe as Tristan Milligan (27 episodes)
- Alex Steele as Tori Santamaria (26 episodes)
- Munro Chambers as Eli Goldsworthy (31 episodes)
- Sarah Fisher as Becky Baker (20 episodes)
- Jessica Tyler as Jenna Middleton (22 episodes)
- Craig Arnold as Luke Baker (18 episodes)
- Demetrius Joyette as Mike "Dallas" Dallas (29 episodes)
- Dylan Everett as Campbell Saunders (Note: Appears in the opening credits from episodes 1–32 only.) (19 episodes)
- Daniel Kelly as Owen Milligan (10 episodes)
- Olivia Scriven as Maya Matlin (30 episodes)
- Ricardo Hoyos as Zig Novak (21 episodes)
- Cristine Prosperi as Imogen Moreno (25 episodes)
- Cory Lee as Ms. Oh (7 episodes)
- Sam Earle as K.C. Guthrie (Note: Appears in the opening credits from episodes 1–14 only.) (6 episodes)
- A.J. Saudin as Connor DeLaurier (20 episodes)
- Alicia Josipovic as Bianca DeSousa (27 episodes)
- Annie Clark as Fiona Coyne (26 episodes)
- Luke Bilyk as Drew Torres (25 episodes)
- Jordan Todosey as Adam Torres (20 episodes)
- Aislinn Paul as Clare Edwards (29 episodes)
- Melinda Shankar as Alli Bhandari (26 episodes)

Cast notes

== Crew ==
Season twelve is produced by Epitome Pictures in association with Bell Media. Funding was provided by The Canadian Media Fund, The Shaw Rocket Fund, RBC Royal Bank, The Canadian Film or Video Production Tax Credit, and the Ontario Film and Television Tax Credit.

Linda Schuyler, co-creator of the Degrassi franchise and CEO of Epitome Pictures, served as an executive producer with her husband, and President of Epitome Pictures, Stephen Stohn. Michael Grassi is also credited as a co-executive producer, Ramona Barckert and Matt Huether as consulting producers, Sarah Glinski an executive producer, and Ella Schwarzman an executive post producer. Stefan Brogren was series producer, while David Lowe is credited as producer, and Stephanie Williams the supervising producer. The casting director was Stephanie Gorin, and the editors are Jason B. Irvine, Gordon Thorne, and Paul Whitehead.

The executive story editor is Ramona Barckert, the story editors are Matt Schiller and Lauren Gosnell, and Ian Malone is the story coordinator. Episode writers for the season are Ramona Barckert, Sarah Glinski, Michael Grassi, Lauren Gosnell, Matt Huether, James Hurst, Ian Malone, Shelley Scarrow, Matt Schiller, and Brendon Yorke. The directors of photography are John Berrie and Mitchell T. Ness, and the directors are Stefan Brogren, Phil Earnshaw, Sturla Gunnarsson, Eleanore Lindo, Mitchell T. Ness, Samir Rehem, and Pat Williams.

== Reception ==
A writer for AfterElton gave the summer block a positive review, saying that it "has easily been the best-written run of Degrassi episodes in several seasons." At the 44th NAACP Image Awards, Degrassi was nominated for an award in "Outstanding Children's Program". At the 1st Canadian Screen Awards director Phil Earnshaw received an award for "Best Direction in a Children’s or Youth Program or Series" for the episode "Scream" Part Two. In addition, Dylan Everett and Aislinn Paul were both nominated for "Best Performance in a Children's or Youth Program or Series" for their performances in "Rusty Cage" Part Two and "Waterfalls" Part Two respectively, also nominated were two performances from season 11, and winner, and fellow Degrassi actress, Melinda Shankar for her performance in How to be Indie.

Degrassi was nominated for a GLAAD Media Award in the Outstanding Drama Series category, alongside Grey's Anatomy, The L.A. Complex, True Blood, and winner Smash. These awards, honour works that fairly and accurately represent the LGBT community and issues. At the 17th Annual PRISM Awards, Degrassi received an award in the Teen Program category for their portrayal of "drug, alcohol and tobacco use and addiction, as well as mental health issues".

== Episodes ==
The first run, of 20 episodes, aired in July and August 2012, for a total of five weeks. Except for the summer finale, this season again aired episodes on the same nights in Canada and the United States. Three one-hour specials aired, the fall finale, another three weeks later, and the finale three weeks before season 13. The opening credits were revised twice this season, to reflect the changing cast, Sam Earle was removed in the 15th episode, and Dylan Everett was removed in the 33rd episode.

No. overall	No. in season	Title	Canada airdate	U.S. airdate	Prod. code
278	1	"Come as You Are" Part One	July 16, 2012	July 16, 2012	1201
As the Degrassi students return from Winter break, they get exciting news from school. With Kate returning from rehab, Drew plans to break up with her. Claire is happy to see Eli, but questions if the kiss was real or not.
279	2	"Come as You Are" Part Two	July 17, 2012	July 17, 2012	1202
As he suffers a massive hangover, Drew tries to piece together the night of the party. Clare tries to work her first date with Eli alongside her first day of internship. Also, Maya begins to wear chicken cutlets and auditions for Mo's band.
280	3	"Walking on Broken Glass" Part One	July 18, 2012	July 18, 2012	1203
Katie can't get over her heartache and decides to get revenge on Drew and Bianca. Meanwhile, Eli is forced to work with Becky Baker on the school play. Also, Tristan develops a crush on the new student Campbell Saunders and poses as Maya online to talk to him.
281	4	"Walking on Broken Glass" Part Two	July 19, 2012	July 19, 2012	1204
Drew deals with his concussion symptoms while trying to win back Bianca. Meanwhile, Eli and Becky clash while casting Romeo and Juliet, but after learning of her religious beliefs, he finds a way to force her out. Also, Tristan tries out for the play and continues to pose as Maya online in order to talk to Campbell.
282	5	"Got Your Money" Part One	July 23, 2012	July 23, 2012	1205
Zig has difficulty concealing his poverty when Tori makes a big deal of their four-month anniversary. Meanwhile, Dave has trouble adjusting to the idea of playing a gay Romeo in the school play. Also, Fiona returns to Degrassi, thrilled to see Imogen but unsure the feeling is mutual.
283	6	"Got Your Money" Part Two	July 24, 2012	July 24, 2012	1206
Zig is put in a difficult position when it comes to impressing Tori and contemplates stealing again. Meanwhile, the anticipation for his first time with Alli is ruined when the hockey players make fun of Dave playing a gay character. Also, Fiona learns that Imogen may be questioning her sexuality.
284	7	"Say It Ain't So" Part One	July 25, 2012	July 25, 2012	1207
Alli finds out that she can finish school a year early and get an exclusive place at MIT. However, she grows sick and questions if she's pregnant. Meanwhile, Jake decides to forego college and work for his father. Also, Campbell has trouble fitting in with the hockey team.
285	8	"Say It Ain't So" Part Two	July 26, 2012	July 26, 2012	1208
Scared about the fact that she may be pregnant, Alli makes a big decision regarding her future. Meanwhile, Jake tries to construct a rooftop garden at Degrassi but finds it hard to do without his father. Campbell lashes out at Maya due to the stress that he is being put under.
286	9	"Closer to Free" Part One	July 30, 2012	July 30, 2012	1209
Jenna is opposed to a friendship with Becky until she meets her attractive brother Luke. Meanwhile, Clare receives advice from Asher and is embarrassed when Connor and Adam post their comments on Twitter. Also, due to his concussion, Drew's schoolwork begins to suffer.
287	10	"Closer to Free" Part Two	July 31, 2012	July 31, 2012	1210
Jenna gets baptized in order to be with Luke but soon realizes her intentions for doing so were a mistake. Meanwhile, Drew considers dropping out of school in order to work at the mall. Also, Clare is letting the Twitter trend affect her personal and professional lives.
288	11	"Waterfalls" Part One	August 1, 2012	August 1, 2012	1211
Clare, who wants Asher's approval, pitches a story about the play. Meanwhile, when K.C.'s mother smothers him, he decides to set her up with his teacher. Also, Maya and Campbell go on their first date with Katie as nuisance chaperon.
289	12	"Waterfalls" Part Two	August 2, 2012	August 2, 2012	1212
Clare attempts to move past the fact that Asher kissed her and keep working with him until he inappropriately touches her. Meanwhile, K.C. and Bianca celebrate the success in their plan until he receives life-changing news. Also, Maya and Campbell's relationship is threatened.
290	13	"Rusty Cage" Part One	August 6, 2012	August 6, 2012	1213
Campbell begins to feel the pressure of leading the hockey team to victory and skips practice to be with his friends. Meanwhile, K.C. contemplates giving his father a second chance after he is released from prison. Also, Fiona and Drew blame each other for the mess in the loft.
291	14	"Rusty Cage" Part Two	August 7, 2012	August 7, 2012	1214
Campbell decides to get rid of the pressure and attention he gets from hockey by committing a dangerous act. Meanwhile, K.C. realizes his father is a bad influence on his mother and decides to cut ties with him for good. Also, Drew and Fiona attempt to move past their arguing. Note: This marks the final appearance of Sam Earle as K.C. Guthrie.
292	15	"Never Ever" Part One	August 8, 2012	August 8, 2012	1215
Imogen designs an elaborate set for the play and is forced to ask her estranged mother for money. Meanwhile, Becky interferes with the play's ticket sales by asking for donations to feed the homeless and butts heads with Adam. Also, Katie likes Jake but is convinced it's not mutual, and instead, Dallas catches her eye.
293	16	"Never Ever" Part Two	August 9, 2012	August 9, 2012	1216
Imogen is in denial when her father is diagnosed with dementia while attempting to juggle completing the set, Fiona, and an overbearing mother. Meanwhile, Becky feels guilty and wants to connect with Adam, not knowing that he's transgender. Katie and Jake become a couple, which doesn't sit well with Dallas.
294	17	"Sabotage" Part One	August 13, 2012	August 13, 2012	1217
Clare continues to avoid telling anyone the truth about her internship and makes enemies with the Ice Hounds when she writes a nasty article about them. Meanwhile, Dave enters a contest with Tori and Tristan to win a role on "Westdrive." Also, Drew feels left out and spends money to impress his friends.
295	18	"Sabotage" Part Two	August 14, 2012	August 14, 2012	1218
Eli convinces Fiona to organize a surprise 17th birthday for Clare and discovers she's keeping a secret. Meanwhile, Dave feels that he and Alli aren't considering each other first and makes a decision about their relationship. Also, Drew's mother wants him to return home and go to school, but he has other plans.
296	19	"Scream" Part One	August 15, 2012	August 15, 2012	1219
Eli has to juggle opening night, fighting off Dallas, the Bakers, and a group of parents set on stopping the play while also seeking revenge for Clare. Meanwhile, Tristan wants to find someone to be his first kiss in the next 24 hours before the play opens. Also, Becky can't accept the fact that Adam is transgender.
297	20	"Scream" Part Two	August 16, 2012	August 16, 2012	1220
Tristan is nowhere to be found on the opening night of the school play. Meanwhile, Clare, along with Katie, concoct a plan to get revenge on Asher by planting nude photos of her on his computer. Also, Becky feels guilty for her actions and tries to earn Adam's forgiveness.
298	21	"Building a Mystery" Part One	October 12, 2012	October 12, 2012	1221
Becky begins to fall for Adam and worries about how her conservative parents will react. Meanwhile, Eli struggles to make a two-minute production for a school project and smokes marijuana after learning Jake has taken it up. Also, Bianca doesn't know how to tell Audra that she and Drew are engaged.
299	22	"Building a Mystery" Part Two	October 19, 2012	October 19, 2012	1222
Becky decides to tell her parents that Adam is transgender but realizes that she may also not be ready to accept the truth. Meanwhile, after coming off the high, Eli realizes that his film is terrible, and Clare helps him make a new film. Also, Bianca wants Audra to accept the fact that she and Drew are getting married.
300	23	"Doll Parts" Part One	October 26, 2012	October 26, 2012	1223
Maya feels unappreciated by her boyfriend and her band, so Tori gives her a pageant-style makeover. Meanwhile, Marisol thinks Mo, her boyfriend, is hiding something from her and finds syringes in his bag. Also, Adam tries out for the boys volleyball team but needs to convince his mother to give him permission. Guest star: Ben Mulroney as himself. Note: This is the 300th episode in "The Next Generation" series, and the number 300 was said in dialogue three times.
301	24	"Doll Parts" Part Two	November 2, 2012	November 2, 2012	1224
Tori and Maya become enemies as they compete against each other in a beauty pageant and Maya goes after Zig. Meanwhile, Marisol accuses Mo of being a drug addict when, in actuality, he is hiding his diabetes from her. Also, Adam's nose gets broken in volleyball practice, and he attempts to keep it from his mother. Guest star: Ben Mulroney as himself.
302	25	"I Want It That Way" Part One	November 9, 2012	November 9, 2012	1225
Alli, who is extremely stressed with her school work and her tutor sessions with Campbell, decides to have a little fun. Meanwhile, to be the lead in Eli's latest film and to catch the eye of Fab, Tristan decides to go on a cleanse with Tori to lose weight. Also, Imogen's mother disapproves of Fiona.
303	26	"I Want It That Way" Part Two	November 16, 2012	November 16, 2012	1226
Alli convinces Dallas to give her pills in order to stay awake, but they soon threaten her health and relationships. Meanwhile, Tristan becomes obsessed with losing weight, which could lead to deadly consequences. Also, Fiona bonds with Imogen's mother more than Imogen does. Note: This episode features a reference to Drake, the second time in the series, and the third time that a former Degrassi actor is referred to in the Degrassi universe. The first being Shenae Grimes in Degrassi Goes Hollywood, and the second being Drake in Degrassi Takes Manhattan.
304	27	"Tonight, Tonight" Part One	November 23, 2012	November 20, 2012	1227
Whisperhug have made the finals of the Battle of the Bands, and Adam catches the eye of the lead singer of another band. Meanwhile, still reeling from the kiss, Maya attempts to get Zig interested in Tori again. Also, Clare feels like there is a double standard at home in regard to what she and Jake are allowed to do. Note: This is the 400th episode in the Degrassi franchise.
305	28	"Tonight, Tonight" Part Two	November 23, 2012	November 20, 2012	1228
As WhisperHug prepare for the band competition, things get messy between Adam and Missy. Meanwhile, Zig tells Maya that he wants to break up with Tori in order for them to be together. Also, when Jake receives no punishment for smoking weed, Clare decides to arrange a family meeting. Guest stars: Chaz Bono and Lauren Toyota as themselves.
306—307	29—30	"Degrassi: Las Vegas" "Lovefool"	December 14, 2012	December 14, 2012	1229 & 1230
A series of events leads the upperclassmen students of Degrassi to a spring break in Las Vegas, where all bets are off. Guest stars: Hedley as themselves, and Erik Knudsen as Darrin Howe, inventor of FaceRange, Facebook in the Degrassi universe Note: This is a Las Vegas themed one-hour special, and airs as "Lovefool" in half-hour syndication. It may also be referred to as "Viva Las Vegas".
Part 2
308	31	"Bitter Sweet Symphony" Part One	February 15, 2013	February 15, 2013	1231
As a new semester begins, Cam grows insecure of his relationship with Maya. Spirit week brings fierce competition to the school that has devastating results. Note: This episode marks the final appearance of Dylan Everett as Campbell Saunders.
309	32	"Bitter Sweet Symphony" Part Two	February 22, 2013	February 22, 2013	1232
A tragedy hits Degrassi, which forces everyone to come together as they struggle to cope with an unimaginable loss.
310	33	"Ray of Light" Part One	March 1, 2013	March 1, 2013	1233
While trying to get rid of the image of Cam's dead body, Eli invites Mo and Jake to a mysterious party. Jenna and Connor begin to grow close. Still recovering from Vegas, Kate begins spending more time with Maya and her friends.
311	34	"Ray of Light" Part Two	March 8, 2013	March 8, 2013	1234
Katie tries to open up the Greenhouse again. While he has a big interview for NYU, Eli uses a "little helper"
312	35	"Karma Police" Part One	March 15, 2013	March 15, 2013	1235
When Drew moves back home, Fiona is forced to get a job but suffers a major event. Dallas has a huge secret from Ali. Following the backlash from Cam's death, Zig continues to get the cold shoulder from all his friends.
313	36	"Karma Police" Part Two	March 22, 2013	March 22, 2013	1236
Fiona takes desperate measures to keep her safety. Zig tries to help out a teacher while still feeling guilty about Cam. Note: This episode marks the final appearance of Alex Steele as Tori Santamaria.
314	37	"Zombie" Part One	March 29, 2013	March 29, 2013	1237
Maya posts a salacious video while at a senior party. Meanwhile, Drew and Clare are at odds as they compete for senior class president for the next school year.
315	38	"Zombie" Part Two	April 5, 2013	April 5, 2013	1238
After posting her almost sex tape, Maya deals with the fallout of her actions. Meanwhile, Drew begins to doubt his candidacy. Trying to get more time with Jenna, Connor tries to get Claire and Eli back together.
316–317	39–40	"The Time of My Life"	June 21, 2013	June 21, 2013	1239 & 1240
With graduation and the future on the horizon, the seniors gather one final time for Prom in an unforgettable celebration where surprises will be made, secrets will be exposed, and some relationships will be called into question. Note: This episode marks the final appearances of Annie Clark as Fiona Coyne, Justin Kelly as Jake Martin, Shanice Banton as Marisol Lewis, and Daniel Kelly as Owen Milligan. This is a one-hour graduation special, and airs as "It's The End Of The World As We Know It" in half-hour syndication.

== DVD release ==
Complete 12th Season
Set details	Special features
40 episodes; 3-disc set; 1.78:1 aspect ratio	Back to Degrassi; New Kids on the Block; Shooting the Opening Sequence; 300th Episode Celebration; A Day with the Ice Hounds; Goodbye Uniforms; Inside Fiona's Birthday Brawl; Say Cheese – Photoshoot with Demetrius, Vanessa and Justice; The Making of Romeo & Jules; Bloopers; The Inside Look – Bitter Sweet Symphony; The Table Read – Bitter Sweet Symphony; Graduation Day; Prom Night; The One and Only – Dylan Everett; Eli's Short Film – LIFE; Eli's Short Film – NYU Portfolio; Video yearbook; Commentary
Release dates
(Canada) (United States) Region 1
October 29, 2013
