= List of Degrassi: The Next Generation characters =

Degrassi: The Next Generation is a Canadian teen drama television series created by Linda Schuyler and Yan Moore.

Degrassi: The Next Generation is the fourth entry of the Degrassi television franchise created by Schuyler and Kit Hood, and a revival of Degrassi Junior High and Degrassi High. In Canada, it premiered on CTV on October 14, 2001, and ended on MTV Canada on August 2, 2015.

Like its predecessors, it follows the lives of students attending the titular fictitious Toronto school and depicts some of the typical issues and challenges common to a teenager's life. It also features several cast members from the previous series in recurring adult roles.

The following is a list of characters who have appeared in the television series.

== Cast and characters ==
Main cast (opening credits in every episode)
Special guest cast (credited as "starring" or "also starring" after opening credits when they appear)
Recurring guest star (3+ episodes)
Guest star (1–2 episodes)

Actor	Character	Degrassi: The Next Generation									Degrassi					Gen
Actor	Character	1	2	3	4	5	6	7	8	9	10	11	12	13	14	Gen
Main characters																Gen
Miriam McDonald	Emma Nelson	M	M	M	M	M	M	M	M	M						2
Aubrey "Drake" Graham	Jimmy Brooks	M	M	M	M	M	M	M	S							1
Christina Schmidt	Terri MacGregor	M	M	M												1
Melissa McIntyre	Ashley Kerwin	M	M	M	M	G	S	S	(Note: Appears only in Degrassi: Minis additional content during this season.)							1
Sarah Barrable-Tishauer	Liberty Van Zandt	M	M	M	M	M	M	M	M	S						2
Cassie Steele	Manny Santos	M	M	M	M	M	M	M	M	M						2
Stefan Brogren	Archie "Snake" Simpson	M	M	M	M	M	M	M	M	M	M	M	M	M	M	–
Jake Goldsbie	Toby Isaacs	M	M	M	M	M	S	S	S							2
Shane Kippel	Gavin "Spinner" Mason	M	M	M	M	M	M	M	M	M					G	1
Ryan Cooley	J.T. Yorke	M	M	M	M	M	M									2
Lauren Collins	Paige Michalchuk	M	M	M	M	M	M	M	S							1
Daniel Clark	Sean Cameron	M	M	M	M		M	S								2
Dan Woods	Dan Raditch	M	M	M	M											–
Pat Mastroianni	Joey Jeremiah	G	M	M	M	M										–
Jake Epstein	Craig Manning		M	M	M	M	S	S	S							1
Stacey Farber	Ellie Nash		R	M	M	M	M	M	S							1
Andrea Lewis	Hazel Aden	R	R	M	M	M										1
Amanda Stepto	Christine "Spike" Nelson	R	R	M	M	M	M	M	S	S						–
Stacie Mistysyn	Caitlin Ryan	G	R	M	M	M		G								–
Adamo Ruggiero	Marco Del Rossi		R	M	M	M	M	M	S	S						1
Mike Lobel	Jay Hogart			R	R	M	M	M	S	S						1
Deanna Casaluce	Alex Nuñez			R	R	M	M	S								1
Jamie Johnston	Peter Stone					M	M	M	M	M	M					3
Melissa DiMarco	Daphne Hatzilakos		R	R	R	M	M	M	S	S						–
Shenae Grimes	Darcy Edwards				R	R	M	M	S							3
Charlotte Arnold	Holly J. Sinclair							M	M	M	M	M				4
Nina Dobrev	Mia Jones						R	M	M	S						3
Mazin Elsadig	Damian Hayes						G	M								2
Paula Brancati	Jane Vaughn							M	M	M						3
Marc Donato	Derek Haig					R	R	M	M							3
Dalmar Abuzeid	Danny Van Zandt				R	R	R	M	M	M						3
Evan Williams	Kelly Ashoona								M	S						–
Judy Jiao	Leia Chang								M	M	M					–
Jajube Mandiela	Chantay Black				G	R	R	G	M	M	M	M				4
Samantha Munro	Anya MacPherson						(Note: Appears as an uncredited background extra only.)	S	M	M	M	M				4
A.J. Saudin	Connor DeLaurier								M	M	M	M	M	M	M	6
Sam Earle	K.C. Guthrie								M	M	M	M	M			6
Aislinn Paul	Clare Edwards						G	G	M	M	M	M	M	M	M	6
Melinda Shankar	Alli Bhandari								M	M	M	M	M	M	M	6
Raymond Ablack	Sav Bhandari							S	M	M	M	M				4
Natty Zavitz	Bruce the Moose							R	M	M						3
Scott Paterson	Johnny DiMarco						G	R	M	M	S					3
Jordan Hudyma	Blue Chessex								M	M						–
Argiris Karras	Riley Stavros								M	M	M	M				4
Annie Clark	Fiona Coyne									M	M	M	M			5
Landon Liboiron	Declan Coyne									M	M					4
Jessica Tyler	Jenna Middleton									M	M	M	M	M	M	6
Jahmil French	Dave Turner									M	M	M	M	M		–
Munro Chambers	Eli Goldsworthy										M	M	M	M	M	5
Cory Lee	Winnie Oh										M	M	M	M		–
Spencer Van Wyck	Wesley Betenkamp									G	M	M				–
Jordan Todosey	Adam Torres										M	M	M	M		6
Alicia Josipovic	Bianca DeSousa										M	M	M	M		5
Luke Bilyk	Drew Torres										M	M	M	M	M	6
Shannon Kook-Chun	Zane Park									G	M	M				4
Daniel Kelly	Owen Milligan										M	M	M			5
Justin Kelly	Jake Martin											M	M			5
Shanice Banton	Marisol Lewis										R	M	M			5
Chloe Rose	Katie Matlin											M	M	M		5
Cristine Prosperi	Imogen Moreno											M	M	M	M	6
Lyle Lettau	Tristan Milligan											M	M	M	M	7
Olivia Scriven	Maya Matlin											M	M	M	M	7
Alex Steele	Tori Santamaria	(Note: Steele initially appears in the recurring role of Joey's daughter, Angela Jeremiah, for the show's first five seasons.)										M	M			7
Ricardo Hoyos	Zig Novak											M	M	M	M	7
Jacob Neayem	Mo Mashkour											M	M			5
Sarah Fisher	Becky Baker												M	M	M	6
Craig Arnold	Luke Baker												M	M	M	–
Demetrius Joyette	Mike Dallas												M	M	M	6
Dylan Everett	Cam Saunders												M			7
Ana Golja	Zoë Rivas													M	M	7
Andre Kim	Winston Chu													M	M	7
Eric Osborne	Miles Hollingsworth III													M	M	7
Sara Waisglass	Frankie Hollingsworth													M	M	8
Nikki Gould	Grace Cardinal													M	M	7
Niamh Wilson	Jack Jones													M	M	6
Spencer MacPherson	Hunter Hollingsworth													R	M	8
Richard Walters	Tiny Bell													R	M	7
Amanda Arcuri	Lola Pacini														M	8
Reiya Downs	Shay Powers														M	8

Cast notes

== Main characters ==
The following actors have all received star billing and appeared in the opening credits of Degrassi: The Next Generation.

- A regular is an actor who appeared in the opening credits of the show in any given season. In season 6, three actors were credited only for the episodes they appeared in, and in seasons 13–14, all actors are credited only for the episodes in which they appear.
- A recurring character is an actor who does not appear in the opening credits, but appears in several episodes of any particular season.
- A guest appearance means that the actor does not appear in the opening credits, but appears in no more than two episodes of any particular season.

=== Students ===
Character name	Portrayed by	Seasons featured
Adam Torres	Jordan Todosey	10–13 (regular)
Born "Gracie," Adam was a trans boy. He and his brother Drew transfer to Degrassi due to the excessive bullying he has received at his old school. After being outed by Bianca, he is again the victim of transphobia, although he eventually earns respect and admiration from his classmates. As a trans man, finding love is difficult for Adam. After many attempts at romance, he finds love with Becky Baker, despite their opposing beliefs. During summer break, Adam is involved in a car accident in which he inadvertently crashes his car into a tree while texting Becky and later passes away during surgery. When Torres was killed off from the series in 2013, controversy ensued, including a statement from GLAAD. When Degrassi introduced its large and loyal audience to Adam Torres, an authentic, multi-dimensional transgender character, the show not only made television history, but set a new industry standard for LGBT inclusion. With so few transgender characters on television, we are disappointed that Adam's story had to end this way, and we hope other shows will follow Degrassi's lead in bringing stories like Adam's to viewers... Linda Schuyler, one of the show's creators, defended the choice to kill the character, saying in a statement: The combination of Adam being a favorite character, and Jordan being at the end of her contract, presented a unique opportunity to tell this story through such a beloved character. As saddened as we are to say goodbye to Adam, we feel this storyline will affect even more lives in an authentic way...: Adam appeared in 78 episodes.
Alexandra "Alex" Nuñez	Deanna Casaluce	3–4 (recurring); 5–6 (regular); 7 (guest appearance)
Alex is originally a poor, violent outcast whose home life involves protecting her mother from her abusive boyfriends. She is considered a "bad girl" at Degrassi; she hangs out with her rebellious boyfriend Jay and his gang. Her exterior softens as she befriends Ellie, Marco, and her once-nemesis Paige, with whom she begins a same-sex relationship. She briefly becomes a stripper to prevent her family from being evicted. After realizing things are never going to change at home, she moves in with Paige, Marco, and Ellie. She later breaks up with Paige as they are headed down different paths. She is last seen going to live with her aunt in Ajax.: Alex appeared in 41 episodes.
Allia "Alli" Bhandari	Melinda Shankar	8–14 (regular)
Alli is Sav Bhandari's younger sister and Clare Edwards' best friend. For most of her Degrassi tenure, she has rebelled against her conservative Muslim upbringing and became involved in difficult situations, particularly with boys. After her parents were alerted to her unruly ways through her disciplinary file at school, she soon realized that she needed to improve her life. Despite this, she makes many of the same mistakes repeatedly, although she has consistently been a good student. She dates a lot of boys including: Johnny DiMarco, who didn't want to be seen with her; Andrew "Drew" Torres, who cheated on her with Bianca; and Dave Turner, who got upset when he found out she was counting cards in an illegal gambling game. They took a break while she attended science summer camp; on her return, Dave tells her he slept with someone else. Alli breaks up with him and goes to Jake's cabin where they share a kiss due to her being upset over Dave. She and Dave make up and begin dating again. She begins dating Leo after a school trip to Paris, and nearly gets married. After he hits her on several occasions, Alli breaks up with him and begins dating Mike Dallas.: Alli appeared in 162 episodes.
Anya MacPherson	Samantha Munro	6 (guest appearance); 7 (recurring); 8–11 (regular)
Anya has transferred from Lakehurst to Degrassi with her classmates. She is Holly J.'s on/off best friend and a frequent target of her bossiness and criticism. She has a rocky relationship with her first love, Sav, mostly due to his family's Muslim beliefs which differ from her own. She develops a hobby for LARPing. During a spring formal at Degrassi, she convinces Sav to have sex in the limousine to keep him away from his arranged wife. She lies to him about being on the pill, resulting in her needing to take the morning-after pill. Holly J. convinces her to fake a pregnancy to force Sav to drop out of the presidential election, but the plan backfires when Anya and Sav use the pregnancy to increase Sav's votes. Her mother is diagnosed with cancer; she tries to date her mother's doctor, but her feelings are unrequited after he learns she is only 17. During her senior year, she gets rejected by the only college she has applied to and out of grief, has a one-night stand with Owen Milligan, which later turned into a relationship. To deal with her problems, she begins dabbling in cocaine which has a negative effect on her relationship and potential career plans. She graduates from Degrassi and enlists in the Royal Canadian Air Force.: Uncredited appearance by the actress in Season 6.; Anya appeared in 82 episodes.
Ashley Kerwin	Melissa McIntyre	1–4, (regular); 5 (guest appearance); 6-7 (recurring)
Ashley is Toby Isaacs's stepsister. She is popular until she takes ecstasy and damages her relationship with her then-boyfriend Jimmy Brooks and most of her friends. She then becomes a goth and dates Craig Manning until he cheats on her with Manny Santos. She later becomes cordial with Craig again and joins his band, Downtown Sasquatch, until Spinner Mason and Marco Del Rossi kick her out. Craig and Ashley rekindle their relationship; Craig proposes to her, but she refuses, resulting in the discovery of his bipolar disorder. She moves to England to work with her dad in the summer. She breaks up with Craig via email when she meets a new guy, Allister. She returns to Degrassi to finish school. She rekindles her relationship with Jimmy. Her music talent is almost discovered, but she is overlooked when Jimmy's talent is spotlighted, with the tension resulting in their final breakup. She goes on a road trip with Emma, Manny, and Liberty Van Zandt to Smithdale University for the Purple Dragon concert. She sees Craig, who is recently sober performing at the concert and decides to drop out of school and tour with him in Europe.: Ashley appeared in 72 episodes.
Rebecca "Becky" Baker	Sarah Fisher	12–14 (regular)
Becky is an enthusiastic and conservative Christian originally from Florida with a passion for the theater. Becky and Eli Goldsworthy are paired together to write a play, but when Eli changes "Romeo and Juliet" to "Romeo and Jules", she quits. She protests the play due to her conservative beliefs, but becomes accepting of Tristan Milligan's sexuality and Adam Torres's gender identity. Becky enters a relationship with Adam, to the disagreement of her parents. After Adam's death, she becomes wracked with guilt and throws a bonfire for his friends. She is never told that Adam had cheated on her with Imogen Moreno. She later investigates the rape of Zoë Rivas that occurred at Miles Hollingsworth's party. She discovers that her brother, Luke, is involved in the rape and assists Zoë in turning him in. She briefly dates Drew Torres, Adam's brother, and at graduation it is said that she would be attending the University of Vermont for biology.: Becky appeared in 59 episodes including voice only appearances.
Bianca DeSousa	Alicia Josipovic	10–13 (regular)
Bianca is a bad girl and categorized as a "slut" around school. She has admitted to having a criminal record. She aggressively pursues Drew Torres, culminating in her giving him a blowjob while he is dating Alli Bhandari. She continues to pursue Drew and they start dating, to the chagrin of his mother. An ex-boyfriend, Anson, stalks her and attempts to rape her. Drew attempts to save her and is nearly beaten to death before Bianca kills Anson. Anson's gang leader, Vince, threatens them with revenge. Drew covers for Bianca when he tells the police about the incident. Bianca is forced into a sexual relationship with Vince to ensure he won't harm Drew. Drew breaks up with Bianca, claiming she causes too much drama. Later, Bianca improves her grades and attitude in school. Drew and Bianca eventually rekindle their relationship and get engaged. Drew's mother, Audra, crashes the elopement, but accepts their relationship and convinces them to hold off the wedding. After she graduates from Degrassi, she leaves for university. She briefly returns to Toronto to comfort Drew at his brother Adam's funeral. On Thanksgiving, Bianca returns and remorsefully breaks up with Drew after realizing she wasn't the same person she was before and that she wanted to continue to pursue her education by trying new experiences without anything holding her back.: Bianca appeared in 65 episodes including voice only appearances.
Bradley "Blue" Chessex	Jordan Hudyma	8–9 (regular)
Blue is a relaxed, artsy guy. Holly J. Sinclair becomes interested in him when she is interested in losing her virginity. Blue rejects her advances in favor of first getting to know her before they have sex. They break up, but get back together when he saves her life in a robbery at The Dot. During Season 9, he tries to change Holly J. which results in their ultimate breakup. He is last seen getting a girl's phone number at a school carnival.: Blue appeared in 11 episodes.
Bruce the Moose	Natty Zavitz	7 (recurring); 8–9 (regular)
A friend of Johnny and Derek's, he is the typical bully, and is on the football team. He makes fun of other students at Degrassi whenever he gets the chance. He catches Dave pouring urine all over his locker and threatens to meet him after school the next day. Dave tries to make peace with Bruce and, although Bruce doesn't beat him up, he throws a water balloon filled with urine at him. Johnny starts to disassociate himself from Bruce, which initiates a conflict between them. Johnny refers to him as "Mr. Two Credits Shy.": Bruce appeared in 25 episodes.
Campbell "Cam" Saunders	Dylan Everett	12 (regular)
Cam was a gentle-nature kind of guy and the best player on the hockey team, the Ice Hounds. He's said to have already been considered for the NHL despite being in grade 10. He thought he was flirting online with Maya Matlin but found out later it was Tristan Milligan, Maya's gay friend who was scared to talk to him. Despite this, Cam develops feelings for Maya and they begin a relationship. He feels too pressured to perform at hockey and has additional stress from living almost 10 hours from home, which causes him to develop depression. In one of his depressed moods, he jumps off the catwalk and breaks his arm. Cam, Maya, and Zig Novak enter a romantic love triangle. Cam feels increasingly stressed by hockey, the love triangle with Zig, and overall hopelessness. Cam leaves a video message for Maya to meet him outside of Degrassi. While waiting for Maya, Zig calls him a "psycho," claiming that if Cam loved Maya, he would stay out of her life forever. Cam is finally pushed too far. He sends Maya a text message saying, "I'm not coming. Sorry. It's over." Later that night, Cam kills himself in the school greenhouse. His body is found the next morning by Eli Goldsworthy.: Cam appeared in 20 episodes.
Chantay Black	Jajube Mandiela	4–5, 7 (guest appearances); 6 (recurring); 8–11 (regular)
Chantay is the known gossip queen of Degrassi and a member of the Power Squad. She is the writer of The Anti-Grape Vine Blog. She convinces Leia Chang to break up with Danny Van Zandt, claiming that it would help their relationship, but she has hidden feelings for Danny herself. She feels guilty and tries to get them back together, but fails when Danny informs her he has feelings for her too. In Season 10, she becomes captain of the Power Squad. After Principal Archie Simpson cancels all school clubs as part of his crack down for the events of Casino Night, Chantay becomes one of the leading figures in convincing Principal Simpson to hold a forum to get the clubs back. She is last seen graduating from Degrassi and attending prom with her friends.: Chantay appeared in 64 episodes.
Clare Edwards	Aislinn Paul	6–7 (guest appearances); 8–14 (regular)
Clare is Darcy Edwards's younger sister and best friends with Alli Bhandari. She attended private school before attending Degrassi. She continues to wear her private school uniform at Degrassi during her first year. She later begins to change her conservative looks and stuck-up attitude to a more normal teenage girl appearance. She develops a crush on K.C. Guthrie and they date for a time. Principal Sheppard calls her a "bitch" for protesting against him after he is rude to the gifted class. She stops wearing glasses after having laser eye surgery. She meets Eli Goldsworthy and they develop feelings for one another when he helps her deal with her parents' fights and eventual divorce. After a while, she wants a break from Eli because she feels the relationship is suffocating. He crashes his car in hopes that she will visit him in the hospital. When Clare realizes his motives, she calls him manipulative and ends their relationship. Clare becomes a reporter for the school newspaper. She begins a relationship with Jake Martin, her mother's boyfriend's son. After their parents get married, they continue a secret relationship. Jake later breaks up with Clare when she rushes into sex with him. She temporarily moves into another home, where she witnesses cannabis production and social withdrawal. She gets a journalism internship. When her boss sexually harasses her, she loses this internship. She intends to frame him with naked photos of herself, but has a change of heart. She and Eli are elected prom king and queen and they reconcile. Clare is diagnosed with cancer in Season 13, but survives her illness. Eli later cheats on her with his roommate and editor. She breaks up with him and kisses Drew Torres during Thanksgiving, but later reconciles with Eli again. Clare develops stronger feelings for Drew and breaks up with Eli again when she feels he's being distant. She and Drew have sex and Drew breaks off their relationship because he knows she still loves Eli. She and Eli get back together after a storm forces her to stay with him in New York. After hitting her head and passing out, Clare goes to the hospital. Later, she gets a call from her doctor saying that everything is safe for her and her baby. She discovers she is pregnant and assumes it is Drew's child; however, it is revealed to be Eli's child when she discovers that she is further along than she thought. She is accepted to Columbia University. Clare and Eli rekindle their relationship, but later find out Clare has had a miscarriage. After Clare graduates, she decides to take a gap year; she and Eli agree that they can make long-distance work and they kiss.: Clare appeared in 181 episodes.
Connor DeLaurier	A.J. Saudin	8–14 (regular)
Connor is the godson to Archie "Snake" Simpson and Christine "Spike" Nelson. He has Asperger syndrome. He befriends K.C., Alli, and Clare, and develops a crush on Clare. He starts the band, The Three Tenners, playing as a DJ for them. He becomes addicted to an online role-playing game and forms a relationship with a middle-aged woman with whom he plays. He starts to steal underwear from the female students and faculty at Degrassi which leads to him being suspended. He joins the football team and is teased by Mo and the other teammates. Connor retaliates against Mo by creating a fake profile online, only to realize that this destroyed Mo's confidence. The two then reconcile and become friends. He begins dating Jenna Middleton. He was the valedictorian of Degrassi's Class of 2014.: Connor appeared in 106 episodes including voice only appearances.
Craig Manning	Jake Epstein	2–5 (regular); 6-8 (guest appearances)
Craig is a ladies' man with a passion for music. He is Angie's half-brother. He is physically and emotionally abused by his father until he moves in with Joey Jeremiah, a used car salesman and his deceased mother's husband. He tries to rekindle his relationship with his father until his father's death. He starts dating Ashley, but cheats on her with Manny, whom he gets pregnant. He wants to keep the baby, but Manny makes the decision to have an abortion. He is the co-founder and lead singer of the band Downtown Sasquatch. He rekindles his relationship with Ashley and soon proposes to her, but she refuses, resulting in the discovery of his bipolar disorder. They continue dating after she leaves for England to work with her father. She breaks up with him via email after she meets a new guy, Allister. Ellie Nash develops a crush on him, but he ignores her for his rekindled relationship with Manny. He moves out of Toronto to start his music career; he develops a cocaine addiction while away. He is seen performing at a Purple Dragon concert at Smithdale University. Ashley leaves with him to tour Europe. In the film Degrassi Goes Hollywood, Ellie runs into him in Los Angeles. He has been in rehab and has a new girlfriend, much to the disappointment of Ellie who still has feelings for him. However, the two share a passionate kiss at the airport.: Craig appeared in 69 episodes.; Craig reappeared in an episode of Degrassi: Next Class' second season during an alumni event at Degrassi and once again during the 4th season.
Mike Dallas	Demetrius Joyette	12–14 (regular)
When Mike Dallas (often simply called Dallas) was 14, he had a child with his then-partner Vanessa. Years later, Dallas is the captain of the hockey team Ice Hounds. He lives in the Torres home with Drew and Adam. Dallas has a party attitude and harasses girls at Degrassi. He starts hanging out with Katie Matlin, but when she starts dating Jake, he becomes jealous and wrecks their garden. Dallas crashes Clare's birthday party and gets in a fight with Eli. He starts to show an interest in Alli and makes up with the people he has hurt while at Degrassi. He takes Cam's suicide hard, believing it is his own fault and contemplates his own suicide on the roof of the school until Fiona Coyne talks him out of it. Throughout the summer, he comforts Drew when Adam dies. During his senior year, he gets cut from the hockey team which leads to him having a short term drinking problem. Later, he deals with the effects of racial profiling. He is dating Alli.: Dallas appeared in 73 episodes.
Damian Hayes	Mazin Elsadig	6 (guest appearance); 7 (regular)
Damian is Lakehurst's student council president until the school burns down and Lakehurst students move to Degrassi. He hooks up with Manny Santos the night of J.T.'s death. Later, he begins a relationship with Emma, but he develops a secret attraction to Liberty. He eventually cheats on Emma with Liberty and she breaks up with him. He graduates from Degrassi and attends college at Banting.: Damian appeared in 9 episodes.
Daniel "Danny" Van Zandt	Dalmar Abuzeid	4–6 (recurring); 7–9 (regular)
Danny is Liberty's younger brother. He is friends with J.T. Yorke and Derek Haig. He gets into a fight when he sees Lakehurst students mocking J.T.'s death. He is framed for shoplifting by Derek after he becomes close with a girl Derek has a crush on. He starts seeing Mia Jones until he finds out that she slept with a celebrity to further her modeling career. He starts dating Leia Chang, who lies about her persona to impress him. He confronts her and tells her that he likes her for who she is. Chantay Black convinces Leia to break up with him claiming that it will improve their stale relationship, but Chantay has hidden feelings for him as well. Chantay tries to get them back together, but he informs Chantay that he has feelings for her too. He is offended when Chantay refers to him as "another student" in her blog instead of "boyfriend." He also gets offended when another blog seemingly makes him out to be a cheapskate when he had Chantay pay her share of the bill. He graduates from Degrassi and attends Cornell University.: Danny appeared in 71 episodes.
Darcy Edwards	Shenae Grimes	4–5 (recurring); 6–7 (regular); 8 (guest appearances)
Darcy is a straight-laced Christian, a member of the Friendship Club, older sister to Clare Edwards, and the leader of the Spirit Squad. She dates Spinner Mason and helps to convert him into a born-again Christian. She posts risqué photos of herself online that attracts a 40-year-old man who tries to contact her. Spinner breaks up with her because of her hypocritical behavior. Afterwards, she develops a relationship with Peter Stone. She is raped at a snowboarding party and contracts chlamydia. After the discovery, she tries to commit suicide and is put in counseling to deal with her issues. She falsely accuses Archie Simpson of inappropriate behavior, which results in an investigation and his temporary suspension from Degrassi. Darcy eventually rebuilds her spirit and is forgiven by most of her friends. She moves to Kenya for a semester to build homes, leaving Peter behind.: Darcy appeared in 40 episodes.
David "Dave" Turner	Jahmil French	9–13 (regular)
Dave is Chantay's cousin. His goal at Degrassi is to "rise to the top." Bruce catches him pouring urine all over his locker and threatens to meet him after school the next day. He tries to make peace with Bruce, but although Bruce doesn't beat him up, he throws a water balloon filled with urine at him. He is on the basketball team and makes a game-winning shot that makes him popular. He forms a band with Wesley and Connor, called "The Three Tenners", as lead vocals. He tries to suck up to the new media teacher, Miss Oh, but fails. He is initially embarrassed that his father is a police officer at the school. He dates a girl named Sadie, but still harbors feelings for Alli; which causes Sadie to break up with him. He develops a relationship with Alli, but he cheats on her with a girl named Jacinta over the summer. Dave wins Alli over again after several dates, but Jacinta comes to Degrassi during a Model UN convention. She attempts to ruin Dave's relationship because of her broken heart, but she gets hit by a passing car making Dave feel guilty. He is last seen at a celebration of life after Adam's death. He was never seen or heard from again.: Dave appeared in 94 episodes including voice only appearances.
Declan Coyne	Landon Liboiron	9–10 (regular)
Declan is Fiona Coyne's twin brother. He is rich and usually calm and conceited. He develops an attraction to Jane Vaughn, resulting in Jane cheating on Spinner Mason. Jane breaks up with him after Holly J. Sinclair convinces her not to break Spinner's heart. Declan later develops an attraction to Holly J. and they begin dating. She tells him she loves him before they have sex; he doesn't reply. His mother announces that they are moving back to New York, much to his disappointment. He tries to convince his mother to stay and he finally tells Holly J. he loves her. He submits a video to a broadcasting network in New York for Holly J., who gladly accepts the internship offer. He is kissed on the lips by a drunk Fiona because she is jealous he is spending his time with Holly J. rather than with her. The following school year, he attends Vanderbilt Prep in New York. During his long-distance relationship with Holly J., he offers her money to remedy her financial woes, but she breaks up with him. He then shows up at Degrassi in hopes of rebuilding his relationship with Holly J. and ends up hooking up with her. He later finds out that Holly J. felt pressured into having sex. He returns to New York. Later, Holly J. receives flowers from Declan when she is in the hospital.: Declan appeared in 26 episodes.
Derek Haig	Marc Donato	5–6 (recurring); 7–8 (regular)
Derek is a class clown and occasional bully. It is revealed that he is adopted. He mocks Jimmy Brooks's basketball coaching because he feels a "cripple" can't teach anyone. He is best friends with Danny Van Zandt until Derek frames Danny for shoplifting when Danny becomes close to a girl Derek likes. He joins the football team in Season 8. He bullies teammate Jane Vaughn because she is a girl on the boys' football team. He is last seen trying to rekindle his friendship with Danny.: Derek appeared in 35 episodes.
Andrew "Drew" Torres	Luke Bilyk	10–14 (regular)
Drew is Adam's step-brother. He tries out for the football team and becomes Riley Stavros's rival for quarterback. He blackmails Riley by threatening to out him as gay. He allows Bianca DeSousa to perform oral sex on him while he is in a relationship with Alli Bhandari, which results in their break up. He starts to date Bianca after realizing that no other girl wants to date him. Drew attacks Anson, Bianca's ex-boyfriend, who attempts to rape her. This leads to Bianca killing Anson when he gets the upper hand on Drew. Drew files a restraining order on Vince who threatens him. He breaks up with Bianca because she causes too much drama in his life. He is beaten up by a gang, and develops posttraumatic stress disorder. Later, he beats up Vince when he shows up at prom to take Bianca away. He convinces Bianca to turn Vince in with all the information she knows of his gang activities. Drew develops a relationship with Katie Matlin, but still harbors feelings for Bianca. During a house party, Drew has sex with Katie while drunk, but breaks up with Katie to be with Bianca. He drops out of Degrassi and moves in with Fiona Coyne. He proposes to Bianca and his mother crashes the wedding. Audra convinces them to hold off on the wedding. He returns to school and is elected student council president. After Adam dies in a car accident, Drew develops insomnia. Drew pursues a relationship with Clare Edwards after Bianca breaks up with him. He breaks up with Clare after sex when he realizes she still loves Eli Goldsworthy. He has a crush on Becky Baker, but is afraid to pursue it because of Adam's history with her. He believed that he was the father of Clare's baby until it is confirmed that Eli was the baby's father. He was last seen telling Dallas to keep in contact with him.: Drew appeared in 135 episodes.
Elijah "Eli" Goldsworthy	Munro Chambers	10–14 (regular)
Because Eli is often seen wearing black and driving a hearse, other Degrassi students believe he has an obsession with death. He develops feelings for Clare Edwards after they become partners in English class. He tries to stand up to Fitz's bullying. After becoming distant with Clare, he tells her that his ex-girlfriend died right after an argument they had. At the school's Vegas Casino Night, Eli taints Fitz's drink, causing him to vomit. Fitz threatens Eli with a knife and Fitz is arrested. It's revealed that Eli is a hoarder. He becomes overprotective of Clare. After feeling smothered by Eli, she wants to take a break and Eli crashes his hearse hoping that would make her visit him in the hospital. She calls him manipulative and leaves him. He takes anti-anxiety pills, causing him to show no emotion toward their break up. He writes a play loosely based on his relationship with Clare, originally framing her as a villain, but then makes her the hero. Eli is diagnosed with bipolar disorder and manic depression. He becomes good friends with Fiona Coyne and starts a relationship with Imogen Moreno while hiding his strong feelings for Clare. After coming back from school break, he gets back together with Clare and clashes with fellow theater producer Becky Baker. Taking charge of the play, Eli produces an alternative version of Romeo and Juliet called "Romeo and Jules" which features two males in the leading roles. He begins smoking marijuana with Jake Martin. With the stress from Clare and finding Cam Saunders's lifeless body, he takes MDMA. While under the influence of MDMA, he takes a shower in the girls' bathroom and runs around the school naked. He learns to cope with everything and gets his life back on track, but breaks up with Clare. They get back together at prom while they are elected prom king and queen. He goes to New York after graduation, but returns to Toronto when he finds out Clare has cancer. When he returns from NYU, it is revealed that he cheated on Clare. Clare eventually takes him back, but she later breaks up with him over voicemail for Drew. It is revealed Clare is pregnant with his child. Clare and Eli rekindle their relationship but later find out Clare has miscarried her baby; Eli is there to help her through it.: Eli appeared in 113 episodes.
Eleanor "Ellie" Nash	Stacey Farber	2 (recurring); 3–7 (regular); 8 (guest appearance)
Ellie is originally a goth whose father is deployed to Afghanistan, leaving her with her alcoholic mother. She begins to self-harm by cutting herself with the point of a drawing compass. She develops feelings for Marco Del Rossi, but when he comes out to her as gay, she agrees to begin a fake relationship with Marco to hide his homosexuality from his friends. She receives help for her self-harming behavior after Paige Michalchuk finds out and tells the school counselor. She starts dating Sean Cameron and moves in with him after her mother accidentally sets their apartment on fire. After her breakup with Sean, she develops a crush on Craig Manning; she is ignored by him when he rekindles his relationship with Manny Santos. She graduates from Degrassi with the class of 2006. She attends Toronto University and is roommates with Paige, Marco, and Griffin. She becomes a journalist at the school newspaper, The Core. She dates Jesse until she discovers Caitlin Ryan making out with him. She and Marco are invited to visit Paige in Los Angeles after she starts an acting career. She discovers that her father is back from Afghanistan and has post-traumatic stress disorder. She discovers that Craig has a new girlfriend, much to her disappointment. However, the two share a passionate kiss at the airport and it was hinted that they would eventually begin a relationship. Marco finally convinces Ellie to visit her father at the hospital.: Ellie appeared in 74 episodes.
Emma Nelson	Miriam McDonald; Samantha Morrison & Ashlee Henricks in photos from the earlier series	1–9 (regular)
As the daughter of Shane McKay and Christine "Spike" Nelson (who gave birth to Emma immediately after season 2 of Degrassi Junior High), Emma is the main protagonist of Degrassi: The Next Generation. She has attended at least four weddings of the earlier series' characters, including Joey Jeremiah's unseen wedding to Julia Manning during the interim between the series, at which time she met and danced with future classmate Craig Manning, the son of the bride. Emma is best friends with Manny Santos throughout the series. She is smart, determined, and idealistic, though sometimes to a fault. She champions a broad range of causes such as protecting the environment and boycotting genetically modified food. She even goes nude for a cause. Having been foreshadowed in the penultimate Degrassi High episode "Three's a Crowd", Archie Simpson marries Emma's mom, much to Emma's initial discomfort. She has an on-and-off romance with Sean Cameron throughout her time on the series. She contracts gonorrhea after performing oral sex on Jay Hogart. She develops an obsession with dieting and exercise and is diagnosed with anorexia and bulimia. She is cheated on by Damian Hayes when he pursues Liberty Van Zandt. She graduates from Degrassi and attends Smithdale University with Manny Santos and Liberty. She starts dating their male roommate Kelly. She puts her enrollment at Smithdale at risk when she bakes weed brownies, but Kelly is blamed instead. Kelly breaks up with her, after taking a job with his dad, stating that she is being too controlling. She isn't doing well in school and decides to take a break from university. She returns to Toronto for the summer and accidentally sets The Dot on fire while taking Spinner Mason's shift. After discovering his break up with Jane Vaughn, she tries to comfort him and takes him to a casino. They become inebriated and elope. After multiple tries to get a divorce, they realize they love each other and have a celebration to recommit their vows.: Emma appeared in 125 episodes.; Emma reappeared in an episode of Degrassi: Next Class' second season during an alumni event at Degrassi.
Fiona Coyne	Annie Clark	9–12 (regular)
Fiona is Declan's twin sister. She is rich, fashionable, and snobbish. She has a personality disorder, believed to be borderline personality disorder and exhibits behaviors including a fear of being alone and has unstable personal relationships. She starts dating Riley Stavros, although she becomes suspicious of his sexuality. They break up after Riley calls her a bitch because she tells him he "can't cure homosexuality." She drunkenly kisses Declan on the lips because she feels jealous that Declan is spending his time with Holly J. Sinclair instead of with her. She and Declan move back to New York and attend Vanderbilt Prep, where she starts dating Bobby Beckonridge. Bobby becomes abusive and cheats on her with his ex-girlfriend, causing her to fall into depression and to secretly fly back to Toronto. Her mother decides to let her stay at Degrassi and she and Holly J. become close friends. Fiona becomes stressed when she is required to testify against Bobby and self-medicates with champagne. After a talk from Holly J., Fiona takes her prescribed medication and is able to cope with the trial and later win the case. She heads to rehab for her alcoholism after an intervention. Upon returning to Degrassi, she attempts a relationship with Adam Torres until he realizes her preference for girls. She begins a romantic friendship with a girl named Charlie, inviting her to live with her, but it doesn't work out. Her family loses their money when her mom is put under house arrest due to suspicion of fraud. As a result, Drew Torres becomes her roommate to help her pay rent. Soon her family gets their money back, but it doesn't phase her as she realizes she could do well without it. She later develops a relationship with Imogen Moreno. Imogen and Fiona break up at prom when Imogen meddles with her future. Fiona graduates from Degrassi and goes to Italy where she is interning for a fashion designer.: Fiona appeared in 96 episodes.
Francesca "Frankie" Hollingsworth	Sara Waisglass	13–14 (regular)
Frankie is a freshman student at Degrassi and a member of Power Squad. Frankie is Miles' younger sister and Hunter's twin sister. She is friends with Zoë Rivas and shows Zoë pictures of the night she was assaulted. She begins dating Winston Chu, Miles' best friend, and wishes to keep this a secret.: Frankie appeared in 44 episodes.
Grace Cardinal	Nikki Gould	13–14 (regular)
Grace is a sophomore goth and who hangs out in the "Rubber Room" hallway of Degrassi, and is an assumed friend of Miles Hollingsworth. She helps Maya Matlin find out who started the Facerange page about her. She is later seen to be in the Remedial Room with Maya and Zig Novak and quickly befriends them both and helps with computer and gang issues. She helps Zoë make the website where boys pay for naked pictures of Power Squad members.: Grace appeared in 36 episodes.
Hazel Aden	Andrea Lewis	1–2 (recurring); 3–5 (regular)
Hazel is a member of the Spirit Squad and Paige's best friend. She is popular and occasionally catty towards other girls. She is insecure about her Muslim heritage. She dated Jimmy Brooks for almost two years. She almost loses her friendship with Paige because of her hatred towards Alex Nuñez. She graduates from Degrassi with the class of 2006 and attends college outside of Toronto.: Hazel appeared in 58 episodes.
Holly Jeanette "Holly J." Sinclair	Charlotte Arnold	7–11 (regular); 11 (guest appearances)
Holly J. is the younger sister of the unseen character Heather Sinclair. She is rude, sarcastic, and sometimes cruel to other students at Degrassi, but she is also insecure and easily hurt by others' opinions towards her. She insists on being called Holly J. rather than Holly. She is best friends with Anya MacPherson until she realizes how abusive Holly J. is towards her. She starts dating Blue, but she is rejected after she tries to lose her virginity to him. She reconciles with Blue after he saves her life at the robbery of The Dot but later breaks up with him because he tries to change her. She finds out that Jane Vaughn is cheating on Spinner Mason with Declan Coyne, but convinces Jane to break up with Declan because she will break Spinner's heart. Holly J. eventually starts dating Declan. She tells him she loves him before they have sex for the first time, but he doesn't reply. After his mom tells him and his twin sister Fiona that they're moving back to New York, Holly J. walks in on Declan trying to convince his mom to let him stay with Holly J.; he finally tells Holly J. he loves her. During her internship in New York during the summer, Fiona tries to take her job and the two feud, but they become best friends after Fiona moves back to Toronto. She loses her spot as student council president to Sav Bhandari. She joins an SAT prep course using $2,000 that she stole from Fiona's bank account. Fiona is furious with Holly J. but forgives her after she apologizes. Holly J. and Declan's long-distance relationship hits a snag when she believes he is cheating on her. However, he ends up coming to visit her instead. They break up when Holly J. becomes uncomfortable after Declan starts offering to pay for things for her. She and Sav later develop a casual romantic relationship. After a while, she breaks it off when she doesn't have stronger feelings for him. Later, she becomes very ill with a staphylococcal infection, which causes her to experience kidney failure. She is then put on a treatment of dialysis. She graduates as the valedictorian of her class, and attends Yale University. Holly J. reveals she is still at Yale during the second season of Degrassi: Next Class.: Holly J. appeared in 100 episodes.; Holly J. reappeared in an episode of Degrassi: Next Class' second season during an alumni event at Degrassi.
Hunter Hollingsworth	Spencer MacPherson	13 (recurring); 14 (regular)
Hunter is the younger brother of Miles Hollingsworth, and the twin brother of Frankie Hollingsworth. He is first seen in season 13 having breakfast with his family. He brings Zoë Rivas breakfast the night after she gets drunk at Miles' party. He plays Realm of Doom. In the game, his character, Sir Excellence, saves Becky Baker's character, and the two begin an online relationship, only to break up when Becky realizes who he is, saying he's too young. Hunter befriends a girl, Arlene, whom he develops a crush on, but he doesn't know how to turn a friendship into a relationship and is worried about ruining their friendship. Later in the season, Hunter argues with his teacher about not finishing his exam. Miles intervenes and Hunter just yells at him telling Miles he makes everything worse. Then, Hunter is with Arlene in class and gives her a pen to use. Miles realizes that Hunter likes her and decides he will try to help Hunter get with her. At the Hollingsworths' house, Miles hosts a party and tries to get Hunter into the pool to spend time with Arlene by taking Hunter's laptop, but Hunter tries to stop him by trying to get his laptop back. Hunter accidentally falls in the pool and is not impressed; he is also angry when everyone laughs at him. Later, after everyone has left, Hunter challenges Miles to a stick fight when Miles won't leave Hunter alone, so they make a deal that if Miles wins, Hunter has to smile for a month and if Hunter wins, Miles must leave him alone. Hunter wins and he tells Miles he wants a better brother, Miles agrees to be better they then hug and to Hunter's surprise, he is happy about it.: Hunter appeared in 22 episodes.
Imogen Moreno	Cristine Prosperi	11–14 (regular)
An energetic and somewhat wild girl, Imogen first makes an appearance in season 11 after helping Eli Goldsworthy get over Clare Edwards and reveals that she has been stalking him. Enamored with Eli, she tries out for his play and gets the part. After having her heart broken by Eli, she eventually becomes friends with him and Fiona Coyne. Fiona decides to set them up when she realizes she has feelings for Imogen. After ending her relationship with Eli, Imogen shares a kiss with Fiona and begins a relationship with her. She finds out her father has dementia, and reveals that her parents are divorced. Fiona and Imogen break up when Fiona graduates and Imogen stays at Degrassi for another year. Imogen then takes an interest in Adam Torres, who is dating Becky Baker. When Imogen kisses Adam, they are caught by Adam's brother Drew Torres. Adam then dies in a car crash while texting Becky. After attending Adam's funeral, Imogen gets the idea of Degrassi TV. When Becky auditions to co-host the show, Imogen is reluctant at first; after acknowledging Becky's talent, she accepts her and they become good friends. She later befriends Jack Jones, and they begin dating. However, they break up after it is discovered that Jack is not out as a lesbian to her parents. She was last seen with Becky dancing in front of the school after their graduation.: Imogen appeared in 95 episodes.
Jacqueline "Jack" Jones	Niamh Wilson	13 (guest appearance); 13–14 (regular)
Jack is a new student who transferred to Degrassi in the beginning of her senior year, and is a member of the Power Squad. She is a lesbian and befriends Becky Baker and Imogen Moreno when they work on a project together. She and Imogen develop mutual feelings for each other which makes Becky jealous. They begin dating. She befriends Clare Edwards and helps her cope with boy troubles by axe-throwing. She has not come out as lesbian to her parents, causing tension with Imogen and their ultimate breakup.: Jack appeared in 23 episodes.
Jacob "Jake" Martin	Justin Kelly	11–12 (regular)
Jake is a straightforward guy who is a family friend of Clare Edwards's. The two begin a romantic relationship, despite their parents also dating. Eli Goldsworthy tries to end their relationship, but soon tries to help save it because he wants Clare to be happy. Jake and Clare break up when his father and Clare's mother get engaged. He kisses Alli Bhandari at a getaway cabin, and is caught by Clare. Jake and Clare get into another relationship, despite the fact that they are now step-siblings. When Jake and Clare decide to have sex, Jake is worried this means they will be together forever, causing them to break up. Jake gets close with Katie Matlin while they work on creating the garden at Degrassi together. They start dating, which causes Mike Dallas to get jealous and he trashes their garden. Jake takes up smoking marijuana, and offers it to Eli. Katie and Jake break up when she lies to him about being with another guy. At prom, Jake and Katie kiss but remain friends. He is last seen graduating from Degrassi.: Jake appeared in 50 episodes.
James Tiberius "J.T." Yorke	Ryan Cooley	1–6 (regular)
J.T. was known as a class clown who got into trouble frequently at Degrassi. He thinks he has a small penis and is caught using a pump in his bedroom by Manny Santos, his girlfriend at the time, who then breaks up with him because he is immature. He starts dating Liberty Van Zandt and gets her pregnant after using a king-sized condom that slips off. He breaks up with her because of how controlling and demeaning she becomes, but he makes up with her after he realizes he loves her and wants to have the child. Jay Hogart approaches him and tries to convince J.T. that he needs to sell drugs to gain financial support for his baby. J.T. refuses at first, but then caves into Jay’s suggestion because he desperately needs money. He begins stealing and selling oxycodone from the pharmacy where he works to make money for Liberty and the baby. He tries to kill himself by overdosing on the drug after Liberty scolds him for his illegal actions, but he survives. Because of his actions, Liberty breaks up with him and puts the baby up for adoption. He starts dating Mia Jones. After Liberty tells him she still loves him at her birthday party, he rebuffs her and she storms off. Later that night, he tells Toby Isaacs that even though he thinks Mia is great, he still loves Liberty. He tries to look for Liberty, but is stabbed by a student from Lakehurst High School before he can tell her. His aorta is punctured and he dies at the hospital leaving Manny, Sean, Liberty, Emma, and Toby in mourning. A school memorial garden is built in his name; when his class graduates, Toby, Manny, Liberty, and Emma place a graduation cap on his memorial and flip the tassel, signaling that he has "graduated" along with their class.: J.T. appeared in 83 episodes.
Anastasia "Jane Vaughn" Valieri	Paula Brancati	7–9 (regular)
Jane arrives at Degrassi after the Lakehurst fire. Her older brother is Lucas Valieri, the father of Mia Jones's daughter, but she prefers that people do not know they are siblings. She reveals that she was molested by her father at a young age. She becomes best friends with Holly J. Sinclair. Spinner Mason immediately develops an attraction to her, and they eventually start dating. She joins the football team and is ridiculed by many of the teammates and the coach. She joins Clare Edwards's protest to get Principal Sheppard fired for calling Clare a "bitch". She becomes the lead singer for Spinner's band, The Studz, after Peter Stone gets kicked out for using meth. She starts cheating on Spinner with Declan Coyne until Holly J. convinces her to break up with Declan before Spinner finds out. After graduation, Spinner overhears Jane and Holly J. talking about when Jane cheated on Spinner, resulting in their ultimate break up. Holly J. and Declan invite her to travel to New York City with them in order to cheer her up. She becomes the lead singer of the band, Flashin' Midnight, but eventually loses her spot to the band's ex-singer. After discovering that Spinner and Emma Nelson are getting married, she travels back to Toronto to try to change his decision, but she realizes that Spinner is better off with Emma. It's mentioned in season 10 that she was at Stanford.: Jane appeared in 34 episodes.
Jason "Jay" Hogart	Mike Lobel	3–4 (recurring); 5–7 (regular); 8-9 (guest appearances)
Jay is known as a rebel and a bully at Degrassi, often torturing other students such as Toby Isaacs and Rick Murray. He is involved with several illegal and inappropriate activities, such as stealing and street racing. Emma Nelson contracts gonorrhea after performing oral sex on Jay. He begins a false relationship with Manny Santos to help her get back at her parents, but it develops into a real relationship. He breaks into a pawn shop to retrieve his mother's ring for Manny after she accidentally pawns it for airplane tickets. They break up, but get back together when Manny needs help getting to Hollywood. Manny and Jay assist Emma in cheering Spinner Mason up after he breaks up with Jane Vaughn. He officiates at Spinner and Emma's renewal of vows.: Jay appeared in 57 episodes.
Jenna Middleton	Jessica Tyler	9–14 (regular)
Jenna plays guitar and sings, and is a member of the Power Squad. She becomes close with Clare Edwards, making Alli Bhandari jealous until Jenna informs her she wants to be friends with her too. She tells them that she was known as a "boyfriend stealer" at her old school. She develops an attraction to K.C. Guthrie, and although she promises Clare she'll stay away from him, K.C. breaks up with Clare for Jenna, ending her friendship with Clare and Alli. She starts taking diet pills in order to lose weight and fit into her Power Squad uniform for the calendar, but ends up suffering from anal leakage and stops. After taking a pregnancy test, she realizes she is actually pregnant with K.C.'s child, and is too far along to have an abortion. K.C. breaks up with her, leaving Jenna and her brother to take care of the baby alone. She enters a talent competition, and despite revealing her secret to the world, she is voted off. She reunites with K.C. Her water breaks during the Spring Dance, and she gives birth to her baby, Tyson. Jenna is tired of taking care of Tyson by herself, and they move in with K.C. and his mother, but this leads to tension and their eventual breakup. She puts baby Tyson up for adoption. She stands by Alli's side after Clare ended her friendship with Alli. The two later rekindle their friendship with Clare. She becomes friends with Becky Baker and becomes a Christian because she has a crush on her brother, Luke, but later realizes he isn't interested in her. Despite that, she stays a Christian and counsels Becky about her homophobia and transphobia. Jenna later begins dating Connor DeLaurier.: Jenna appeared in 118 episodes.
James "Jimmy" Brooks	Aubrey Drake Graham	1–7 (regular); 8 (guest appearance)
Jimmy comes from a wealthy family as he is shown to be wearing expensive outfits and watches. He is Spinner Mason's best friend, though the two fight frequently. He dates Ashley Kerwin until she takes ecstasy and cheats on him at a party. She eventually becomes goth and they get back together, but she breaks up with him after she realizes that he prefers the "old" Ashley. He dates Hazel Aden until he reveals to her that he has feelings for Ellie Nash. After Spinner and Jay Hogart trick Rick Murray into thinking that Jimmy pulled a prank on him, Rick shoots Jimmy in the back, paralyzing him from the waist down. As a result, he uses a wheelchair for the rest of the series. This results in Jimmy ending his friendship with Spinner until they are both forced to repeat their senior year of high school. His dad tries to put him in wheelchair basketball, but Ellie helps Jimmy discover his artistic talent. He graduates from Degrassi, a year later than planned because of the time he had to take off due to physical therapy. He starts to pursue a career in music that blossoms when he rekindles his relationship with Ashley, but they ultimately break up when her musical talent is ignored and his is spotlighted. He starts dating Trina, who also has a physical disability. He comforts Spinner after he doesn't make it into the police academy. He also reveals that he is contemplating proposing to Trina, showing Spinner a sign that he needs to move on with his life.: Jimmy appeared in 100 episodes.
John George "Johnny" DiMarco	Scott Paterson	7 (recurring); 8–9 (regular); 6, 10 (guest appearances)
He is one of the thugs from Lakehurst. He helps beat up Toby Isaacs and was present when Drake Lempkey killed J.T., although he isn't involved in the murder. He attends Degrassi after the Lakehurst fire. He becomes best friends with Bruce the Moose, and the two are often seen bullying other students at Degrassi. He develops a rivalry with Spinner Mason, and they get into a physical altercation that is taped and posted online. Alli Bhandari develops an attraction to him, but he rejects her because she's in 9th grade. He eventually starts going out with her and takes her virginity, claiming that she took his too. Alli starts "sexting" him when he doesn't allow her to be affectionate with him in public. He breaks up with her after she reveals a picture of him holding a teddy bear to the entire school. Angry, he sends a nude picture of her to Bruce. He reveals that he found a genital wart on his penis and that Alli was not the first girl he had sex with. He slowly changes and stops hanging out with his former Lakehurst friends and applies himself academically. He later attends Toronto University.: Johnny appeared in 32 episodes.
Jonah Haak	Ehren Kassam	14 (regular)
Jonah is a sophomore and former troublemaker who is interested in rock music and has now seen the light. He briefly dates Becky Baker but they break up after he steals money from her.: Jonah appeared in 7 episodes.
Katie Matlin	Chloe Rose	11–13 (regular)
Katie is an athletic girl who is clueless when it comes to love. In her free time, she serves as the editor of the school newspaper. Eventually, she starts dating Drew Torres. She helps him deal with his anger issues. As her character progresses, she becomes bulimic. She becomes student council president. Katie tears her ACL playing soccer, which leads to her needing surgery. Katie's parents send her to rehab after she overdoses with codeine in order to keep playing soccer, which leaves her depressed. She later recovers and comes back to school. Drew tries to break up with her, but she doesn't quite digest it and loses her virginity to a drunk Drew at a house party. He breaks up with her again, and she finds out he has moved on to Bianca DeSousa. She publicly humiliates Drew by playing a video of him drunkenly boasting about their sex to the school. She enters a relationship with Jake Martin. She gets accepted to Stanford, but cannot afford it. Katie tries to gamble in order to pay the tuition, but loses all her savings. She seeks help from a millionaire until he asks for sex, which she refuses. However, in the beginning of season 13, Katie gets an athletic scholarship to Stanford by attending soccer camp.: Katie appeared in 55 episodes.; Katie reappeared in the last two episodes of the third season of Degrassi: Next Class and once in the fourth season.
Kirk Cameron "K.C." Guthrie	Sam Earle	8–12 (regular)
K.C. is smart, short-tempered, and a member of the basketball and football teams. He befriends Connor DeLaurier and Alli Bhandari, and develops an attraction to Clare Edwards. It is revealed that he lives in a group home, which makes Clare feel uncomfortable, but they start dating. Jenna Middleton develops an attraction to K.C., and although she promises Clare she'll stay away from him, he breaks up with Clare for Jenna, leaving Clare angry at both of them. Coach Carson develops an interest in him, which initiates a friendship between the two, until the coach tries to set K.C. up with a prostitute. K.C. shows Archie Simpson and Principal Hatzilakos Coach Carson's gun that he had shown K.C. earlier and Carson is quickly arrested. His mother is released from prison. She eventually proves to him that she has changed and he decides to move into her apartment. He initially ends his relationship with Jenna when he finds out she's pregnant and too far along to have an abortion. Eventually, he realizes that he's not over Jenna and tells her that he wants to be involved with the baby's life and the two get back together. After Tyson is born, he applies for a job at Little Miss Steaks, and Jenna and the baby move in with him and his mother. He starts a relationship with Marisol Lewis, causing his breakup with Jenna. He and Jenna give Tyson up for adoption. Later, K.C.'s father is released from prison; K.C. and his mother move to Vancouver to escape from him.: K.C. appeared in 71 episodes.
Kelly Ashoona	Evan Williams	8 (regular); 9 (guest appearance)
Kelly attends Smithdale University and is roommates with Emma Nelson, Manny Santos, and Liberty Van Zandt. He starts dating Emma after he nullifies their "no dating roommates" policy. He takes the blame for Emma when she bakes weed brownies and is forced to leave the residence hall. He breaks up with her on a cycling tour, after his dad offers him a job, because she becomes too controlling and demeaning.: Kelly appeared in 11 episodes.
Leia Chang	Judy Jiao	8–10 (regular)
Leia transfers to Degrassi from a ballet school. She becomes friends with Mia Jones until she discovers that Mia has performed sexual acts on men to advance her modeling career. She develops a relationship with Danny Van Zandt and lies about knowing the band Fall Out Boy to impress him and his friends. He confronts her and tells her that he likes her for who she is and they have a fresh start. When the relationship becomes stale, Leia asks Chantay Black how to rekindle her romance with Danny, so Chantay advises her to break up with him thinking that he'll come crawling back to her. Afterwards, Danny asks Chantay out on a date and Leia is heartbroken. Chantay asks Leia to talk to Danny, but Danny reveals that he has feelings for Chantay. Her ultimate fate is unknown.: Leia appeared in 17 episodes.
Liberty Van Zandt	Sarah Barrable-Tishauer	1–8 (regular); 9 (guest appearance)
Liberty is a smart and highly ambitious student at Degrassi, and is active in student council and extracurricular activities. After having a crush on J.T. Yorke since the beginning of the series, they finally start dating. He gets her pregnant after using a king sized condom that slips off. Although he breaks up with her because she becomes too controlling and demeaning, he still tries to help her through her pregnancy, and they eventually get back together and plan to raise the child together. After J.T. becomes a drug dealer and attempts to kill himself by overdosing on drugs he stole, she breaks up with him and decides to put the baby up for adoption. Later, J.T. and Manny Santos plan a birthday party for Liberty. Although J.T. is already dating Mia Jones, Liberty tells him that she still loves him, but he declines and tells her he loves Mia, and she storms out of the party. After admitting to Toby Isaacs that he really does love Liberty, J.T. tries to find her, but is stabbed by a student from Lakehurst and dies. Afterwards, Liberty is unable to mourn because she is in shock, but she finally cries during his memorial held at Degrassi. She develops feelings for Damian Hayes. They share a kiss at prom, initiating Damian's cheating on Emma Nelson, who ultimately breaks up with him. She attends Smithdale University and rooms with Emma, Manny, and Kelly Ashoona. She tries to get into her mother's sorority, but she rejects the offer when she finds out that she was just their "token." She briefly appears in Degrassi Takes Manhattan at Spinner Mason's and Emma's wedding celebration.: Liberty appeared in 102 episodes.; Liberty reappeared in an episode of Degrassi: Next Class' second season during an alumni event at Degrassi.
Lola Pacini	Amanda Arcuri	14 (regular)
Lola is a freshman at Degrassi. She has bright pink hair. She is close friends with Shay Powers and Frankie Hollingsworth. She is first seen trying out for the Power Squad, and making the team. She participates in Degrassi Nudes with the rest of the team. After the team gets in trouble, she is given detention for the rest of the year. She is kissed by Winston Chu initiating him cheating on Frankie, and Lola tells Frankie what happened after feeling guilty.: Lola appeared in 20 episodes.
Luke Baker	Craig Arnold	12–14 (regular)
Luke is a Christian hockey player and Becky Baker's brother. He has very conservative beliefs like his parents. He manipulates girls' emotions. He attends one of Miles Hollingsworth's parties and sexually assaults Zoë Rivas. He is expelled from Degrassi, and sent to prison for two years. He is last seen when Becky visits him in prison.: Luke appeared in 28 episodes.
Manuela "Manny" Santos	Cassie Steele	1–9 (regular)
Born in Manila, the Philippines, she is a Filipino girl who struggles to define herself throughout the series, and is often criticized by students and her abusive father for her promiscuity. She is best friends with Emma Nelson. She becomes pregnant with Craig Manning's baby and opts for an abortion after deciding that she's not ready to be a mother. She starts a relationship with J.T. Yorke, which ends because she believes that he is too immature. She dates Spinner Mason until she finds out that he is the reason that Jimmy was shot by Rick. She rekindles her relationship with Craig and continues dating him while he's in Vancouver. She discovers his cocaine addiction when he returns and decides to try cocaine herself to fit in with Craig's friends. She ultimately breaks up with him when she feels he is choosing cocaine over her. She forms a fake relationship with Jay Hogart to get freedom from her parents, resulting in both of them developing real feelings for each other and their fake engagement turning into a real one. She breaks up with him when he calls her a "bitch" after he breaks into a pawn shop to steal the engagement ring she pawned off. She graduates from Degrassi and attends Smithdale University rooming with Emma, Liberty Van Zandt, and Kelly Ashoona. In Degrassi Goes Hollywood, she goes on a road trip to audition for a role in Jason Mewes' directorial debut film Mewesical High. She rekindles her relationship with Jay. In Degrassi Takes Manhattan, she encourages Emma to listen to her heart and eventually supports her decision to marry Spinner.: Manny appeared in 128 episodes.
Marco Del Rossi	Adamo Ruggiero	2 (recurring); 3–7 (regular); 8-9 (guest appearance)
First appearing as a great dancer, Marco becomes the love interest of Ellie Nash until he reveals to her that he is gay. They form a fake relationship to mask his homosexuality. After coming out to his friends, he becomes alienated by Spinner Mason, who cannot get over the discomfort of having a gay friend, but he eventually accepts him. Marco becomes a victim of a hate crime after being gay bashed by a group of men while en route to a hockey game. He develops a crush on Paige Michalchuk's brother, Dylan, and they eventually start dating. He comes out to his mother, but doesn't come out to his father until a year later. He graduates Degrassi with the class of 2006. He attends Toronto University and rooms with Ellie, Paige, and Griffin. He is faced with the idea of male prostitution by a friend, but he turns away. In Degrassi Goes Hollywood, Paige invites Ellie and him to visit her in Los Angeles after she starts an acting career. After getting into a fight with Paige for becoming a diva, she smacks him. In Degrassi: Next Class it is discovered they rekindled their friendship. After discovering that Ellie's father is back from Afghanistan and has PTSD, he finally convinces her to visit him. He briefly returns to Degrassi as a student-teacher and struggles with the decision to give Holly J. Sinclair more time to complete her essay.: Marco appeared in 81 episodes.; Marco reappeared in an episode of Degrassi: Next Class' second season during an alumni event at Degrassi.
Marisol Lewis	Shanice Banton	10 (recurring); 11–12 (regular)
Marisol is a cheerleader and a waitress at Little Miss Steaks. She later becomes Vice President of Student Council. Marisol befriends K.C. Guthrie, and he eventually chooses her over his relationship with Jenna Middleton. She goes back to focusing on her long-time crush, Drew Torres, who ends up with her best friend, Katie Matlin. She starts dating Mo Mashkour after a model UN event. She gets upset with Mo when she thinks he is hiding a drug problem, but finds out that Mo has diabetes. She is last seen graduating from Degrassi with her friends.: Marisol appeared in 59 episodes including voice only appearances.
Maya Matlin	Olivia Scriven	11–14 (regular)
Maya is Katie's younger sister. Maya loves music, and wants to start her own band; she is a cello virtuoso. She is best friends with Tori Santamaria and Tristan Milligan. She is ridiculed by the hockey team for having a flat chest and tries to use false breasts to make herself more attractive and mature. She experiences first love with Cam Saunders and begins her first relationship with him. When she feels that Cam is no longer interested in her, she enters a beauty contest, but still does not get the reaction she wants from Cam. Maya soon breaks up with him and kisses Zig Novak, who is dating Tori, but runs back to Cam trying to forget the kiss and calls it a mistake. Shortly after this, Cam kills himself in the school greenhouse, putting the whole school in mourning. Unable to properly cope with Cam's death, Maya goes through a rebellious phase. She attends a senior party, drinks, posts a provocative video, and nearly has sex with an older man. However, she soon breaks down and admits the pain she's in and starts to make an emotional recovery. She goes to Paris for the summer with Tristan and develops a love/hate relationship with Miles Hollingsworth, while also getting into a rivalry with Zoë Rivas. After getting together with Miles, the two soon break up after many difficulties. After getting Mr. Yates fired, she and Tristan have a falling out and their friendship is strained. In the end of season 14, she begins dating Zig and rekindles her friendship with Tristan.: Maya appeared in 102 episodes.
Mia Jones	Nina Dobrev	6 (recurring); 7–8 (regular); 9 (guest appearances)
Mia has a child, Isabella "Izzy" Jones, with Lucas Valieri when she is 13 years old. When Mia first appears, Izzy is a toddler and Mia has just transferred to Degrassi from Lakehurst. She dates J.T. Yorke until he is stabbed to death by a Lakehurst student. She rekindles her relationship with Lucas, but they ultimately break up when he refuses to accept being a parent. After posing with quarterback Danny Van Zandt at a pep rally, she is offered a modeling career. She starts dating Danny and becomes friends with Leia Chang until they discover that Mia has been performing sexual acts to further her modeling career. She starts a relationship with Peter Stone. She briefly drops out of school for her modeling career because of the stress of maintaining both, but later decides to finish school and cut down on modeling instead. She accepts a modeling contract in Europe and has to move. Peter intends on moving with her until he gets involved with crystal meth, resulting in their break up.: Mia appeared in 35 episodes.
Miles Hollingsworth III	Eric Osborne	13–14 (regular)
A spoiled athlete who transferred from a European prep-school, both Tristan Milligan and Zoë Rivas develop a crush on Miles while summering in Paris. He is best friends with Winston Chu. His father verbally abuses him. He begins a relationship with Zoë, but breaks up with her when he sees how mean she can be. As the new school year begins, Miles becomes closer to Maya Matlin and Tristan, eventually forming a relationship with Maya. They break up when his jealousy of Maya and Zig Novak's friendship scares Maya. He starts dating Tristan in season 13. His father abuses him more and Miles hides the truth from Tristan, skipping school often to smoke weed. Tristan, Frankie, Hunter, and Winston stage an intervention; Miles angrily says to Tristan, "I treat you like absolute garbage and you keep crawling back for more, are you really that desperate for someone to love you?" and he storms out of the room. He gets in his car and is about to drive away but accidentally hits Maya. He then drives her to her therapist's appointment and when they are driving back, he is high and hits an open car door, causing it to fall off. Miles convinces Maya to lie about the accident so his father won't find out, but she eventually tells the truth to the police. Tristan breaks up with Miles because he feels like Miles is using him. In the mid-season finale, he accidentally sets the hallway on fire. He then has to work in the cafeteria as part of community service.: Miles appeared in 53 episodes.
Mohammed "Mo" Mashkour	Jacob Neayem	9 (guest appearance); 11 (recurring); 11–12 (regular)
Mo enjoys making music and is on the football team. He assists Sav on his crush-turned-relationship with Ms. Oh. He picks on Marisol; he even puts gum in her hair, but he soon starts dating her. When Marisol finds syringes in his bag, she accuses him of taking street drugs, but Mo actually has diabetes. He graduates from Degrassi, but not before singing a song in front of the entire school to Marisol as an apology for his behavior at prom.: Uncredited appearance by the actor in Season 9.; Mo appeared in 37 episodes.; Mo reappeared in an episode of Degrassi: Next Class' second season during an alumni event at Degrassi.
Owen Milligan	Daniel Kelly	10 (recurring); 10–12 (regular)
Owen is a bully and jock at Degrassi. Despite his homophobic attitude, he is caring towards his gay younger brother, Tristan. At Casino Night, he offers to pay Alli Bhandari $50 to hook up with him, but Drew Torres stops him before anything happens. He then starts having feelings for Anya MacPherson, and despite her originally feeling uncomfortable, she begins a relationship with him after a one-night stand. He slowly grows into a more thoughtful person, helping Tristan survive high school. He graduates from Degrassi.: Owen appeared in 40 episodes.
Paige Michalchuk	Lauren Collins	1–7 (regular); 8 (guest appearances)
Paige is a popular student at Degrassi who often says mean things to other students. She is raped by Dean, a rival soccer player at another school, at a party. She loses her trial against him due to lack of evidence. As an act of revenge, she crashes Spinner Mason's car into Dean's and loses her license. She develops a relationship with Spinner until he cheats. She begins a rocky lesbian relationship with Alex. She graduates from Degrassi with the class of 2006. Although she is high on marijuana during an interview with a representative from Banting University, she is accepted. After repeated panic attacks and failing grades, she drops out of Banting. She is roommates with Ellie Nash, Marco Del Rossi, and Griffin at Toronto University afterwards. She starts a low-level job at a fashion designer company. After sleeping with Griffin, she discovers that he is HIV-positive, and has been since birth. Although they used a condom, she must wait 6 months to hear if she is tested positive or not. In Degrassi Goes Hollywood, she is working for a snobby reality television star in Los Angeles. After scoring the main role in Jason Mewes' directing debut film Mewesical High, she invites Marco and Ellie to visit her. After fame starts to go to her head, she becomes a diva. Marco confronts her about her attitude and she smacks him. She loses the role because of her behavior and becomes Jason Mewes' assistant during the movie. She is last seen trying to call Marco, who doesn't answer. In Degrassi: Next Class, it is discovered they rekindled their friendship over the years.: Paige appeared in 100 episodes.; Paige reappeared in an episode of Degrassi: Next Class' second season during an alumni event at Degrassi.
Peter Stone	Jamie Johnston	5–10 (regular)
Peter is Mrs. Hatzilakos' son. He attends Degrassi after years of homeschooling. He first came off as a kid with a lavish lifestyle funded by his father, but later on develops a heart. He takes advantage of Manny after she becomes drunk and films her baring her breasts. He eventually uses the footage to get revenge by emailing it to the entire school. He secretly dates Emma after the situation, but she breaks up with him after he stores drugs in Sean's locker. He starts dating Darcy, although he almost risks her life by selling risqué photos of her to an internet stalker. He forms the band, The Stüdz, with Sav and Danny to keep himself occupied after school. After discovering that his mother is moving to Regina, he emancipates himself from his parents and lives on his own to stay with Darcy. When Darcy moves to Kenya, he develops a relationship with Mia. Mia reveals that she is moving to Paris after signing a modeling contract in Europe. He intends to move with her until he becomes addicted to crystal meth after being humiliated at Declan and Fiona's party, resulting in their ultimate break up and his separation from The Stüdz. His mom returns from Regina and eventually takes over Degrassi again as Principal. He forms a club called 'Above The Dot' that features live band performances for kids who cannot get into bars in order to raise money for college. He rejoins the band Janie and the Studz, but the band breaks up during Degrassi Takes Manhattan. He becomes a server at the Dot while he attends college. Peter is revealed to be working at a major recording studio in the second season of Degrassi: Next Class. He offers Maya an internship.: Peter appeared in 70 episodes.; Peter reappeared in 4 episodes during the second season of Degrassi: Next Class.
Rick Murray	Ephraim Ellis	
Rick was a major recurring character. He dated Terri MacGregor, but their relationship turned abusive and resulted in Terri landing in a coma. He was expelled for this, but let back in the following year, and soon after, he brought a gun to school. Fortunately, he did not kill anybody. However, before he could kill co-prime target, Emma Nelson, Sean Cameron wrestled him for the gun and killed Rick by accident. Before his death, Rick also had Emma at gunpoint and shot Jimmy Brooks, permanently paralyzing him from the waist down. Rick managed to make one friend in Toby Isaacs. All of Rick's bullying culminated Degrassi through a storyline that changed its history forever.: Rick appeared in 10 episodes.
Riley Stavros	Argiris Karras	8–11 (regular)
Riley struggles to accept his homosexuality. He starts taking steroids in attempt to make himself attracted to girls, but he eventually quits. He starts dating Fiona Coyne, but she eventually realizes he's struggling with his sexuality so she breaks up with him. Riley is attracted to a lifeguard who is also gay. Still struggling with his anger, he punches the lifeguard and is forced to take anger management classes. Riley eventually becomes comfortable with being gay when he develops feeling for Zane Park. However, Riley is still uncomfortable with the student body knowing his sexuality. Drew Torres overhears a conversation and blackmails Riley into giving him the quarterback position. Riley tries to teach the football team to be more sensitive. He struggles with becoming the first openly gay football player, but finally accepts it and kisses Zane in the hallway soon after. His mother walks in on Zane and Riley kissing, but she refuses to accept it and is in denial even after he tells her that he is gay. He breaks up with Zane after deciding that he would rather have a "normal" relationship with his parents. Despite the break up, his mother finally accepts him and he graduates from Degrassi. He seems to have rekindled things with Zane at prom.: Riley appeared in 35 episodes.
Savtaj "Sav" Bhandari	Raymond Ablack	7 (recurring); 8–11 (regular)
Sav is Alli's older brother. He has an on-and-off relationship with Anya MacPherson, despite his parents' disapproval. He forms a band, The Stüdz, with Peter Stone, Danny Van Zandt, and Spinner Mason. Anya convinces him to have sex in the limo at the spring formal after his arranged wife visits. He breaks up with her after she reveals to him that she lied about taking birth control. After his band breaks up, he decides to compete against Holly J. Sinclair for student council president. Holly J. convinces Anya to fake a pregnancy in order to force Sav to drop out of the election, but her plan backfires after they use the fake pregnancy to their advantage. When he wins four backstage concert passes and his father refuses to let him go, he steals his father's truck; the police catch him on the way back. He has a brief relationship with Holly J. Hoping to get over Holly J., he attends a Keke Palmer concert where she invites him onstage. He then starts finding himself falling for Ms. Oh. They have a brief relationship before he graduates.: Sav appeared in 91 episodes.; Sav reappeared in 2 episodes during the second season of Degrassi: Next Class.
Sean Cameron	Daniel Clark	1–4, 6 (regular); 7 (guest appearance)
Sean has a violent past and is sent to Toronto by his parents to keep him out of trouble. He develops an on-and-off relationship with Emma Nelson. During his rebellious phase at Degrassi, he becomes friends with Jay Hogart and Alex Nuñez. He starts dating Ellie Nash after spending time together in Saturday detention. He gets emancipated after his brother moves to Alberta. Ellie moves in with him after her mother sets their apartment on fire because of her alcoholism. He saves Emma's life after he tries to wrestle a gun out of Rick Murray's hand, causing the gun to go off and shoot Rick, killing him. He visits his parents in Wasaga Beach while dealing with his feelings about the school shooting. He decides to stay after his parents explain to him why they sent him to Toronto. He returns to Degrassi a year and a half later, but is put in jail after a street racing accident. He rekindles his relationship with Emma and decides to move in with her. He later decides to join the army to make a better life for himself. He visits Emma after training and reveals he is being sent to Afghanistan for war.: Sean appeared in 63 episodes.
Shay Powers	Reiya Downs	14 (regular)
Shay is a freshman who loves playing sports and is determined to be the best athlete. She aims high in school and her standards also extend to boys. Her closest friends are Lola Pacini and Frankie Hollingsworth. She is a member of the Power Squad.: Shay appeared in 18 episodes.
Gavin "Spinner" Mason	Shane Kippel	1–9 (regular); 14 (guest appearance)
Gavin is nicknamed "Spinner" because of his ADHD. Spinner is known as the school bully in his early years. He is a skilled drummer. He alienates Marco after discovering his homosexuality, but eventually accepts him. He is in a relationship with Paige Michalchuk until she finds out that he was seeing Manny Santos behind her back. He dates Manny until it is revealed that he is the cause of Jimmy's paraplegia. He is expelled from Degrassi after he confesses to the principal that he bullied Rick Murray before the school shooting. He returns to Degrassi the next year and starts dating Darcy Edwards, who helps him become a born-again Christian. He later breaks up with her because of her hypocritical behavior. He is diagnosed with testicular cancer and goes through a period of reckless behavior because of his fear of not being seen as a man. He rebuilds his spirit after he starts dating Jane Vaughn. He is shot during a burglary at The Dot, but he soon recovers. He overhears Jane and Holly J. Sinclair talking about when Jane cheated on him, resulting in their ultimate breakup. After Emma Nelson accidentally sets The Dot on fire, causing him to fall into a deeper depression, she takes him to a casino. After winning big, they get drunk and elope. After several attempts to get a divorce, they realize they love each other and have a celebration to recommit their vows. In season 14, Spinner is seen interviewing Eli Goldsworthy after he applies for a job at The Dot. In season 2 of Degrassi: Next Class, Spinner and Emma are still together and are buying a house together.: Spinner appeared in 139 episodes.; Spinner reappeared in 2 episodes during the 2nd season of Degrassi: Next Class.
Theresa "Terri" McGreggor	Christina Schmidt	1–3 (regular)
Terri is the daughter of a widowed father. She is best friends with Ashley Kerwin. She is insecure about her overweight appearance, but her career as a plus-size model improves her self-image. She starts dating Rick Murray who becomes abusive and eventually pushes her down, causing her head to hit a cinder block. She goes into a coma and eventually recovers, but transfers to a private school outside of Toronto and cuts all contact with her friends in order to have a fresh start.: Terri appeared in 34 episodes.
Deon "Tiny" Bell	Richard Walters	13 (recurring); 14 (regular)
Tiny is a sophomore at Degrassi. He is friends with most of the Rubber Room kids. He was previously in a gang, and helps Zig Novak when he is on his own. When his older brother, Vince, pulls him into more dangerous activity, Zig tries to pull him out, which he eventually agrees on doing after Damon gets shot.: Tiny appeared in 22 episodes.
Tobias "Toby" Isaacs	Jake Goldsbie	1–5 (regular); 6-7 (recurring); 8 (guest appearance)
Toby is the step-brother of Ashley Kerwin and J.T. Yorke's best friend. He is Jewish, and it is revealed that his great-grandparents were murdered in The Holocaust. He is an intelligent student and known as a geek because of his interest in computers and anime. He develops bulimia when he joins the wrestling team. He dates Kendra Mason, the younger sister of Spinner, but they break up during the summer before his sophomore year. He is deeply affected by J.T.'s death and develops a disliking to all Lakehurst students. He graduates from Degrassi and becomes a host of robot war competitions.: Toby appeared in 88 episodes.
Victoria "Tori" Santamaria	Alex Steele	11–12 (regular)
Tori was a student at Degrassi Community School. While Tori may be spoiled thanks to her parents indulging her every whim, dance lessons, modeling and beauty pageants, she's definitely not a brat. Her positive attitude, and her bright smile are infectious as she enters Degrassi, believing she's the best at everything. Unfortunately, Tori is a bit sheltered and realizes she's a bit unhip compared to the other students. She is best friends with Maya Matlin and Tristan Milligan, and is also friends with Dave Turner, Cam Saunders (before his death), Marisol Lewis, and had a brief, but somewhat intimate relationship with Zig Novak. She was also on the Power Squad. She went to junior high with Tristan and Zig Novak. Tori left Degrassi after finishing her freshman year.: Tori appeared in 36 episodes.; Steele formerly portrayed Angela Jeremiah, Craig's half-sister and Joey's daughter, during the first five seasons. Like Tori, Angela moved away with her family.; Alex's elder sister, Cassie Steele, portrayed Manuela "Manny" Santos
Tristan Milligan	Lyle Lettau (formerly Lyle O'Donohoe)	11 (guest appearance); 11–14 (regular)
Tristan is the openly gay younger brother of Owen. He is insecure about his appearance and his sexuality. He receives the lead role in Eli Goldsworthy's reimagining of Romeo and Juliet as "Jules". To impress a guy, Tristan tries to get in shape with a cleanse and starves himself. He has a heart attack as a result. The summer before his sophomore year, he lost a ton of weight and goes to Paris with Maya Matlin. They begin a fake relationship to hide his sexuality. During his sophomore year, he develops a crush on the new English teacher, Mr. Yates. Yates reciprocates those feelings and they have sex in Yates' apartment. Maya reveals the affair to Mr. Simpson and Mr. Yates is suspended, causing Tristan to hate Maya. Tristan begins dating Miles at the end of season 13. He breaks up with Miles near the end of season 14A because he couldn't handle Miles's family drama and his downward spiral. He later goes on a date with a guy he met online, but they break up with each other due to lack of interest. He becomes friends with Maya again near the end of the series.: Tristan appeared in 86 episodes.
Wesley Betenkamp	Spencer Van Wyck	9 (guest appearance); 10–11 (regular)
Wesley is considered a nerd at Degrassi. He is best friends with Connor DeLaurier and Dave Turner; he even starts a band, The Three Tenners, with them. He develops a crush on Anya MacPherson and even takes sexual performance-enhancing pills in an attempt to impress her. Dave tazes him after he tells his new "friends" that Dave's dad is a cop as payback for being ditched. He tries to break a world record, but fails and breaks his hand. He develops a relationship with a girl named Hannah.: Wesley appeared in 37 episodes.
Winston "Chewy" Chu	Andre Kim	13–14 (regular)
Winston is Miles Hollingsworth's best friend. He is a reporter for Degrassi News. He slanders Drew Torres's reputation because he feels that Drew's presidential authority is not being used in the way the student body wants. He harbors a crush on Frankie Hollingsworth, whom he begins secretly dating. This causes a strain on his friendship with Miles, but Miles eventually accepts it.: Winston appeared in 51 episodes.
Zane Park	Shannon Kook-Chun	9 (guest appearance); 10 (recurring); 10–11 (regular)
Zane is an openly gay student at Degrassi. He has an on-and-off relationship with Riley Stavros. After a summer together, Zane signs up to be the kicker on the football team in hopes of making football something he and Riley can do together. Zane continues to convince Riley to control his anger and to be totally open with his parents. They break up after a while, only to rekindle at prom. He decides to attend university with Riley.: Zane appeared in 19 episodes.
Zigmund "Zig" Novak	Ricardo Hoyos	11–14 (regular)
Zig comes from a poor home. He has an on-and-off relationship with Tori Santamaria. He becomes increasingly attracted to Maya Matlin. He later calls Cam Saunders a psycho, telling him that if he loved Maya then he would get out of her life. This is a contributing factor in Cam's suicide. He feels guilty over it and begins to act out, eventually joining gangs. He moves in with the Matlins after Maya finds out that his parents kicked him out and he lives in an abandoned house. He develops feeling for Maya and the two kiss, but don't form a relationship. He later develops feelings for Zoë Rivas. He no longer likes Zoë and realizes he is in love with Maya after all the time they've spent together and all they've been through and they get together after Maya kisses him. They both admit they're in love with each other. Maya's mom is not angry that they are in love but she refuses to let Zig live at their house anymore. Zig then moves in with Tiny Bell and his brother, Vince. Zig is nervous to have Maya come over due to Vince's and Tiny's dangerous neighborhood. When Vince throws a party at the house, he gives Zig and Maya molly to help their nerves. Zig and Maya then have sex and become upset about it because they didn't want their first time to be while on drugs, but they are glad it was with each other. After Vince shoots Damon, Zig decides that the right thing to do would be to turn Vince in and Maya stands by his side. Zig and Tiny move in with Jose until things are safe and until he can find a safe place to stay.: Zig appeared in 70 episodes.
Zoë Rivas	Ana Golja	13–14 (regular)
Zoë is a self-centered fashionable girl who transfers to Degrassi after being written out of the popular teen drama, West Drive. She is in a relationship with Miles Hollingsworth, but they break up because of Zoë's behavior towards Maya Matlin and Tristan Milligan. She attempts to date Drew Torres and loses her virginity to him. At one of Miles' parties, she gets drunk and after passing out, is sexually assaulted by Luke Baker and his friend Neil. She takes them to court and despite a few setbacks, wins her case. She joins the Power Squad after revealing to Becky Baker that Clare Edwards is pregnant, causing her to get injured, and opening the spot for Zoë. She creates a website where guys pay money to get anonymous naked pictures from the Power Squad and Zoë later accuses Frankie Hollingsworth of ratting them out, and proceeds to frame her for the entire scandal. After Winston Chu finds out that Zoë is behind the nude photos and the framing of Frankie, he decides to blackmail her in order to exact revenge for his then-girlfriend. After her identity is revealed, Zoë and the Power Squad are put in detention and Principal Simpson is fired due to all the trouble he has allowed. This causes a stricter principal, Principal Pill, to take his place, who disallows the use of cell phones and causes many students to hate Zoë. Zoë makes up for it by smuggling phones in sandwiches, as she is now a lunch lady as part of her community service. Principal Pill finds out about this, but dismisses it. During the summer, Zoë is in summer school due to failing science along with Tristan, Grace Cardinal, and Hunter Hollingsworth. Tristan suggests that Zoë partner with Grace. Zoë is skeptical at first, but quickly becomes friends with her and develops a crush on her, which she originally denies. In order to see if she really does have feelings for her and girls in general, she has a brief fling with Miles. After she constantly makes out with Miles in front of Grace, Zoë and Grace get into an argument at a beach party. At the end of the special, Zoë admits her feelings to Grace and kisses her.: Zoë appeared in 55 episodes.

=== Adults ===
Character name	Portrayed by	Seasons featured
Archibald "Archie" "Snake" Simpson	Stefan Brogren	1–14 (regular)
Archie was a student in the previous series, has become a teacher, and eventually becomes the principal at Degrassi. He marries Spike Nelson and becomes Emma Nelson's step-father. Spike later gives birth to their son, Jack. He is the godfather of Connor DeLaurier. He is diagnosed with leukemia, but eventually goes into remission. He is caught kissing Daphne Hatzilakos by Emma and briefly separated from Spike until they made up; in the interim, he stays with best friend Joey Jeremiah (whose own engagement to Caitlin Ryan was called off years earlier, when Snake revealed Joey's infidelity). Snake is falsely accused of inappropriate behavior by Darcy Edwards and briefly suspended from Degrassi. Midway through season 14, he is put on indefinite leave for the arson accident caused by Miles Hollingsworth; he returns in the season finale to watch the class of 2014 graduate. His situation opened him up to new opportunities, and he heads to Haiti to open a school. He returns to his position as principal in Degrassi: Next Class.: Has been credited in every season of the Degrassi franchise, except The Kids of DeGrassi Street.; Snake appeared in 189 episodes including voice only appearances.; He was the first to say "fuck" on Canadian broadcast television, in the 1992 Degrassi telefilm, School's Out.
Caitlin Ryan	Stacie Mistysyn	1, 7 (guest appearances); 2 (recurring); 3–5 (regular)
A prominent TV journalist, she had a long on-and-off relationship with Joey Jeremiah in the previous series. She rekindles her relationship with Joey and eventually becomes engaged to him again. She breaks off the engagement to accept a position at a nationally syndicated news magazine.: Caitlin appeared in 24 episodes.
Daniel "Dan" Raditch	Dan Woods	1–4 (regular)
He was an English teacher in Degrassi Junior High and assistant principal in the Degrassi High series. He was appointed principal of Degrassi Community School sometime prior to the events of season 1. Known and credited simply as "Mr. Raditch" since 1987, his first name, Daniel, was finally revealed more than halfway through season 3. He was transferred out of Degrassi after the school shooting because the school board felt he mishandled Rick's bullying.: Dan appeared in 50 episodes including voice only appearances.; He and Dr. Sally are the only two Degrassi Junior High and/or Degrassi High adult characters to appear on-screen on Degrassi: The Next Generation (Joey's Mom is an unseen character in "Drive")
Daphne Hatzilakos	Melissa DiMarco	2–4, 9 (recurring); 5–7 (regular); 8 (guest appearance)
Daphne is the divorced mother of Peter Stone. She was a science teacher at Degrassi before being promoted to Principal after Daniel Raditch was transferred out. She had a brief fling with Archie Simpson. She moved to Regina to be near her sick mother. She returns one semester later as acting principal after The Shep was removed and Peter developed a meth addiction. By the end of the year, she relinquished her duties to Archie, the new principal.: Daphne appeared in 68 episodes including voice only appearances.
Joseph "Joey" Jeremiah	Pat Mastroianni	1 (guest appearance); 2–5 (regular)
Joey was a student of Degrassi in the previous series. He is the father of Angela Jeremiah, step-father of Craig Manning, and was the owner of a used car dealership. He rekindles an old relationship with Caitlin Ryan and they later become engaged. Their relationship ends when she accepts a position at a nationally syndicated news magazine and moves away. Later, Joey moves to Calgary with Angie.: Joey appeared in 35 episodes.
Christine "Spike" Nelson	Amanda Stepto	1–2 (recurring); 3–7 (regular); 8–9 (guest appearances)
Spike Nelson was a student at Degrassi, who gave birth to Emma in Degrassi Junior High. She is now a hairdresser, and is married to Archie Simpson with whom she has a son, Jack. She briefly removes Snake from their home after Emma catches him kissing Ms. Hatzilakos, but they eventually make up.: Christine appeared in 51 episodes.
Winnie Oh	Cory Lee	10–13 (regular)
Ms. Oh is the new media immersions teacher and music teacher. She is shown to have a passion for musical outlets. She has a brief teacher-student relationship with Sav Bhandari before his graduation, which is never exposed.: Winnie appeared in 49 episodes.
