= Samantha Munro =

Canadian actress (born 1990)

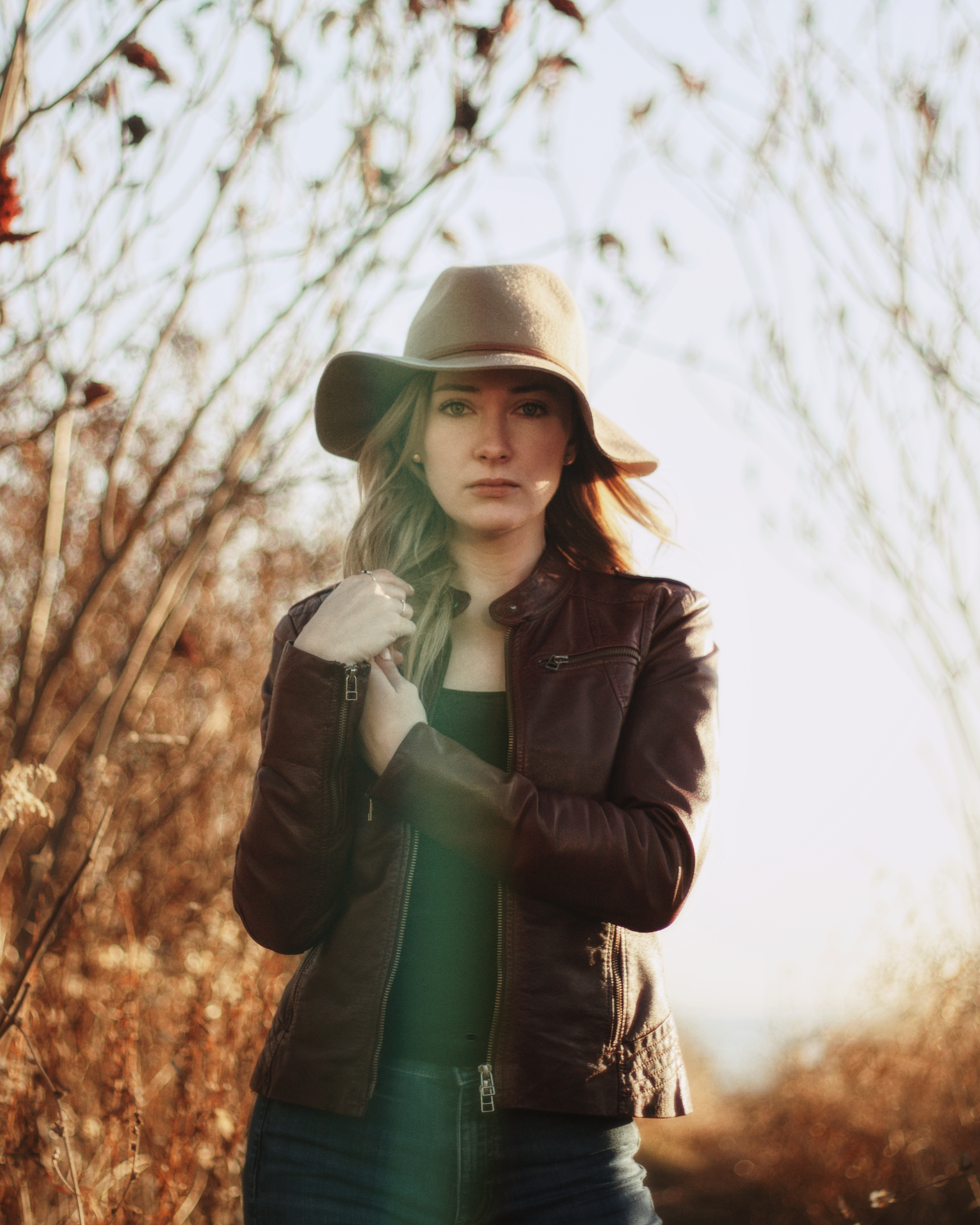
- Munro in 2017
- Occupation: Actress
- Years active: 2006–present
- Spouse: Kyle Zavitz (m. 2019)

Samantha Munro (born October 19, 1990) is a Canadian actress. She is known for her role as Anya MacPherson on Degrassi: The Next Generation. She also played the role of Shannen Doherty in Lifetime's 2015 television film The Unauthorized Beverly Hills, 90210 Story.

== Career ==
Munro played the starring role of Anya MacPherson on Degrassi: The Next Generation for the series' seventh through eleventh seasons. In 2015, Munro was cast in the role of Shannen Doherty in Lifetime's The Unauthorized Beverly Hills, 90210 Story television film.

== Personal life ==
On September 1, 2019, she married Kyle Zavitz, a jazz composer, in Cambridge, Ontario.

== Filmography ==
=== Film ===
Year	Title	Role	Notes
2010	Trigger	Rocker Chick	
2011	The Bend	Sarah MacDonald	
2015	Brooklyn	Dorothy	

=== Television ===
Year	Title	Role	Notes
2006	Falcon Beach	Zoe	Episode: "Wake Jam"
2006	Mayday	Emilie Lacaille	Episode: "Desperate Escape"; also known as Air Emergency
2007–2011	Degrassi: The Next Generation	Anya MacPherson	Uncredited appearance (season 6); Recurring role (season 7); main role (seasons 8–11)
2008	Would Be Kings	N/A	Television miniseries
2010	Gossip Girl	N/A	Episode: "Dr. Estrangeloved"; uncredited
2011	Rookie Blue	Deena	Episode: "In Plain View"
2012	Lost Girl	Beverly	Episode: "School's Out"
2012	Secrets of Eden	Katie	Television movie
2013	The Next Step Aftershow	Herself	Host, Aftershow (season 1) only
2015	The Unauthorized Beverly Hills, 90210 Story	Shannen Doherty	Television movie
2015–2016	Between	Stacey	Main role
2016	Journey Back to Christmas	Julia	Television movie
2018	Her Stolen Past	Missy	Television movie
2019	Good Witch	Melanie	Episode: "The Grey-cation"
