= Daniel Kelly (actor) =

Canadian actor and rapper (born 1992)

- Born: May 25, 1992 (age 34); Mississauga, Ontario
- Other names: Deph Naught, Sif
- Occupations: Actor, rapper
- Years active: 2010–present

Daniel Kelly (born May 25, 1992), also known by his stage names Deph Naught and, more recently, Sif, is a Canadian actor and rapper. He rose to prominence for his portrayal of Owen Milligan on the long-running teen drama series Degrassi: The Next Generation, and has since independently released several mixtapes and music videos.

== Early life ==
Kelly was born and raised in the Clarkson area of Mississauga, Ontario.

== Career ==
=== Acting ===
Kelly was cast as Owen Milligan on the long-running teen drama series Degrassi: The Next Generation in 2010; he starred on the series as a regular from season ten to twelve. After Degrassi, he appeared on Flashpoint.

In 2014, he portrayed Kyle in the television movie Sorority Surrogate with former Degrassi: The Next Generation cast member Cassie Steele.

In 2015, he portrayed Roman in the second season of the award-winning web series Teenagers.

=== Music ===
Using the stage names Deph Naught, and, more recently, Sif, Kelly has recorded rap music. He released numerous mixtapes and music videos on YouTube. He has collaborated with several prominent rappers, including Royce da 5'9.

== Filmography ==
=== Film ===
Year	Title	Role	Notes
2013	The Angel Inn	Pete Miller	
2014	Wolves	Brad Lewis	
2017	What About Shelley	Adam	Short film

=== Television ===
Year	Title	Role	Notes
2010-2013	Degrassi: The Next Generation	Owen Milligan	Main role
2011	Flashpoint	Dixon Green	Episode: "A Call to Arms"
2014	Sorority Surrogate	Kyle	Television film
2018	Taken	Raphael Fratelli	Episode: "All About Eve"

=== Video games ===
Year	Title	Role	Notes
2018	The Quiet Man	Babcock	
