= Shanice Antonette Banton =

Canadian actress

Shanice Banton
- Born: Shanice Antonette Banton; 1992 (age 33–34)
- Education: Wexford Collegiate School for the Arts
- Occupation: Actor
- Years active: 2010-present

Shanice Antonette Banton (born 1992) is a Canadian actress known for her role as Marisol Lewis on the Canadian teen drama series Degrassi: The Next Generation and as Violet Hart on Murdoch Mysteries.

== Career ==
From 2010 to 2013, Banton portrayed cheerleader Marisol Lewis on the long running series Degrassi: The Next Generation She made her feature film debut in 2016 as Minnie Ruth Solomon, the wife of Jesse Owens in the 2016 film Race.

In 2017, she was cast as Violet Hart on Murdoch Mysteries and has had a main role since. She reprised the role in the spin off series Macy Murdoch in 2023.

In 2018, Banton starred in the Lifetime film Her Stolen Past, as medical student Sonya Daniels who discovers that she was a kidnapped child. The film is based on Lynette Eason's book of the same title.

== Personal life ==
Banton is the daughter of Jamaican immigrant parents, the fifth of six children. She trained as a drama and musical theatre student at Wexford Collegiate School for the Arts.

She lives in Toronto.

== Filmography ==
=== Film ===
| Year | Work | Role |
|---|---|---|
| 2016 | Race | Minnie Ruth Solomon |
| 2018 | Isabelle | Carol Murphy |
| 2019 | White Lie | Veronica |

=== Television ===
| Year | Work | Role | Notes |
|---|---|---|---|
| 2010 | Reviving Ophelia | Friend | Television film |
| 2011 | Rookie Blue | Quinn | Episode: "Class Dismissed" |
| 2010-2013 | Degrassi: The Next Generation | Marisol Lewis | Main role |
| 2014 | Haven | Charlotte | Episode: "Spotlight" |
| 2014 | A Day Late and a Dollar Short | Shanice | Television film |
| 2014 | Apple Mortgage Cake | Cecilie | Television film |
| 2015 | Lost Girl | Iris / Nyx / Cecilia Lawrence | 5 episodes |
| 2015 | The Book of Negroes | Emily | "Episode 1.4" |
| 2016 | Private Eyes | Laura Gaynor | Episode: "I Do, I Do" |
| 2018 | Her Stolen Past | Sonya Daniels | Television film |
| 2017-present | Murdoch Mysteries | Violet Hart | Main role |
| 2023 | Macy Murdoch | Violet Hart | 4 episodes |
