= Aislinn Paul =

Canadian actress (born 1994)

- Born: March 5, 1994 (age 32); Toronto, Ontario, Canada
- Occupation: Actress
- Years active: 2000–2019; 2021; 2023
- Known for: Degrassi: The Next Generation
- Awards: Canadian Screen Awards

Aislinn Claire Paul (/ˈeɪslɪn/; born March 5, 1994) is a Canadian former actress. She is best known for her role in Degrassi: The Next Generation as Clare Edwards, for which she has won two Canadian Screen Awards (2015 and 2016) for Best Performance in a Children's or Youth Program or Series, in addition to receiving a Young Artist Award nomination in 2010. She also starred in the Hulu series Freakish.

== Early life ==
Paul was born in Toronto, Ontario, Canada and began working as a child actor at a very young age, starring in commercials and advertising campaigns.

== Career ==
Paul was cast as a recurring character on Degrassi in 2006 when she was only 12 years old and was upgraded to regular a couple years later for season 8. After appearing in nine seasons, she became one of the longest running cast members, eventually exiting the show in 2015 after appearing in more than 220 episodes. For her performance on the show, she was nominated for a Young Artists Award for Best Supporting Young Actress in 2010.

In 2015, she won the Canadian Screen Award for Best Performance in a Children's or Youth Program or Series.

Her other notable TV roles include Hannah Woodal in Wild Card, Amber in the CBS Film, Candles on Bay Street, Isabella in the HBO series Tell Me You Love Me, and Alexa Ammon in the Lifetime Movie Network Original Murder in the Hamptons.

In 2015, Paul starred as Phoebe Frady in Heroes Reborn, and won a second Canadian Screen Award for her final performance in Degrassi.

She starred in the first season of Hulu series Freakish in 2016.

Paul has been on a hiatus from screen acting since 2019. She recently worked for casting for the short film Collision Theory, which she also helped with the visual effects for it.

== Personal life ==
Paul studied at and graduated from the Etobicoke School of the Arts alongside fellow Degrassi star Chloe Rose, who is longtime friends with Paul.

== Filmography ==
=== Films ===
Year	Title	Role	Notes
2001	Sister Mary Explains It All	Angel	Television movie
2003	Do or Die	Heather	Television movie
2003	Betrayed	Bonnie	Television movie
2005	Murder in the Hamptons	Alexa Ammon	Television movie
2006	Candles on Bay Street	Amber	Television movie
2008	Finn on the Fly	Chloe	
2010	Degrassi Takes Manhattan	Clare Edwards	Television movie
2010	Harriet the Spy: Blog Wars	Beth Ellen	Television movie
2010	Trigger	Rocker Chick #3	
2013	The Last Round	The Kid	Short film
2015	Night Cries	Caitlyn	
2016	5 Films About Technology	Corrie	Short film

=== Television ===
Year	Title	Role	Artist
2000	The Famous Jett Jackson	Girl #1	Episode: "Business as Usual"
2001	Doc	Emily Slater / Lindy Slayton	2 episodes
2001	In a Heartbeat	Chelsea	2 episodes
2004	Zoé Kézako	Various voices	3 episodes
2003-2005	Wild Card	Hannah Woodall	Main role
2006-2015	Degrassi: The Next Generation	Clare Edwards	Recurring role (seasons 6–7); main role (seasons 8–14); 231 episodes
2007	Tell Me You Love Me	Isabella	Main role; 10 episodes
2008-2015	Degrassi: Minis	Clare Edwards	12 episodes
2014	Reign	Cosette	Episode: "Dirty Laundry"
2014	Haven	Grace	Episode: "Reflections"
2014; 2019; 2021; 2023	Rick and Morty	Nancy (voice)	3 episodes
2015	Heroes Reborn: Dark Matters	Phoebe Frady	TV mini series; main role; 6 episodes
2015-2016	Heroes Reborn	Phoebe Frady	Recurring role; 10 episodes
2016	Freakish	Natalie Callaway	Main role (season 1); 10 episodes
2017	Private Eyes	Brie Houser	Episode: "The Frame Job"
2019	Room 104	Young Jean	Episode: "Crossroads"

== Awards and nominations ==
Year	Association	Category	Nominated work	Result	Refs
2010	Young Artist Awards	Best Supporting Actress	Degrassi: The Next Generation	Nominated	
2015	Canadian Screen Awards	Best Performance in a Children's or Youth Program or Series	Degrassi: The Next Generation	Won	
2016	Canadian Screen Awards	Best Performance in a Children's or Youth Program or Series	Degrassi: The Next Generation	Won	
