= Alicia Dea Josipovic =

Canadian actress, dancer and singer

- Born: Alicia Dea Josipovic; February 16, 1991 (age 34); Toronto, Ontario, Canada
- Occupations: Actress, dancer, singer

Alicia Dea Josipovic (born February 16, 1991) is a Canadian actress, dancer, singer. She is best known for her role as Bianca DeSousa on Degrassi: The Next Generation.

== Career ==
In 2010, Josipovic began her television career starring in the Canadian teen drama series Degrassi: The Next Generation. She portrayed Bianca DeSousa, a troubled teen with a gang related past, until her departure from the show in 2013. That year, she also appeared as a backup dancer in the children's television films Harriet the Spy: Blog Wars and Camp Rock 2: The Final Jam.

From 2011 to 2012, she appeared as Dancy Cologne, the titular character's ex-friend and current enemy, in the television sitcom series Debra!. She earned a win at the Young Artist Awards for Outstanding Young Ensemble in a TV Series for the show.

In 2021, she released her first single Never Say Goodbye. The single was written for her father, who had recently passed at the time of writing it. The same year, she starred as Miranda in Lifetime's Christmas romantic comedy Secretly Santa.

In 2023, she starred as bookstore owner Samantha in the romantic film Key to Love, alongside Corey Sevier.

== Filmography ==
=== Film ===
Year	Title	Role	Notes
2010	Clive Houston, We Have a Problem	Lady in Short Skirt	Short film
2018	Marriage: Impossible	Ashley	
2021	Falling in Love at Christmas	Miranda	
2023	Key to Love	Samantha Hill	

=== Television ===
Year	Title	Role	Notes
2010	Harriet the Spy: Blog Wars	Dancer	Television film
2010	Camp Rock 2: The Final Jam	Camp Star Dancer	Television film
2010	Degrassi in India	Self	Television film
2010-2013	Degrassi: The Next Generation	Bianca DeSousa	Main role
2011	Silent Witness	Alison Taylor	Television film
2011-2012	Debra!	Dancy Cologne	13 episodes
2014	For Better or for Worse	Sophia	Television film
2015	Reign	Daphne	Episode: "Fugitive"
2018	Murdoch Mysteries	Kathleen Cooper	Episode: "Crabtree a la Carte"
2019	Ransom	Dawn Eastman	Episode: "Justice"
2019	Frankie Drake Mysteries	Sally	Episode: "Out on a Limb"
2021	Nurses	Dale	Episode: "Code Orange"
2021	Secretly Santa	Miranda	Television film; aka Falling in Love at Christmas
2021	The Love Issue	Darcey Harrison	Television film

=== Web series ===
Year	Title	Role	Notes
2010-2011	Degrassi: Minis	Bianca DeSousa	4 episodes

== Awards and nominations ==
Year	Award	Category	Nominated work	Result	Notes	Ref.
2012	Young Artist Awards	Outstanding Young Ensemble in a TV Series	Debra!	Won		
