= Degrassi: Next Class season 2 =

Degrassi: Next Class
- Season 2
- No. of episodes: 10

Release
- Original network: Family (Canada); Netflix (International); ABC3 (Australia)^{1}
- Original release: July 19 – September 20, 2016

Season chronology
- ← Previous; Season 1 Next → Season 3

2016, on Family Channel under the teen block F2N in Canada and began streaming internationally on July 22, 2016, on Netflix.

== Synopsis ==
This season follows the core group of students as sophomores and juniors as they try to navigate high school with stories such as racism, major depressive disorder, oppositional defiant disorder, transgender rights, sex, protest, self-harm, sexual identity, cystic fibrosis, Police brutality, BDD and Self-image.

== Cast ==
=== Series regulars ===
The second season has nineteen actors receiving star billing with all nineteen of them returning from the previous season.

- Amanda Arcuri as Lola Pacini (9 episodes)
- Amir Bageria as Baaz Nahir (6 episodes)
- Soma Bhatia as Goldi Nahir (6 episodes)
- Jamie Bloch as Yael Baron (5 episodes)
- Stefan Brogren as Archie "Snake" Simpson (2 episodes)
- Chelsea Clark as Esme Song (5 episodes)
- Reiya Downs as Shaylynn "Shay" Powers (9 episodes)
- Ana Golja as Zoë Rivas (9 episodes)
- Nikki Gould as Grace Cardinal (9 episodes)
- Ricardo Hoyos as Zigmund "Zig" Novak (9 episodes)
- Ehren Kassam as Jonah Haak (7 episodes)
- André Kim as Winston "Chewy" Chu (7 episodes)
- Lyle Lettau as Tristan Milligan (8 episodes)
- Spencer MacPherson as Hunter Hollingsworth (6 episodes)
- Eric Osborne as Miles Hollingsworth (9 episodes)
- Dante Scott as Vijay Maraj (6 episodes)
- Olivia Scriven as Maya Matlin (8 episodes)
- Sara Waisglass as Francesca "Frankie" Hollingsworth (9 episodes)
- Richard Walters as Deon "Tiny" Bell (9 episodes)

=== Supporting cast ===
==== Alumni ====
- Jamie Johnston as Peter Stone (4 episodes)
- Raymond Ablack as Savtaj "Sav" Bhandari (2 episodes)
- Shane Kippel as Gavin "Spinner" Mason (2 episodes)
- Charlotte Arnold as Holly J. Sinclair (1 episode)
- Sarah Barrable-Tishauer as Liberty Van Zandt (1 episode)
- Lauren Collins as Paige Michalchuk (1 episode)
- Jake Epstein as Craig Manning (1 episode)
- Miriam McDonald as Emma Nelson-Mason (1 episode)
- Jacob Neayem as Mohammed "Mo" Mashkour (1 episode)
- Adamo Ruggiero as Marco Del Rossi (1 episode)

==== Parents & Faculty ====
- Stephanie Moore as Mrs. Diana Hollingsworth (5 episodes)
- Michael Brown as Mr. Blake Mitchell (4 episodes)
- Aisha Alfa as Ms. Grell (3 episodes)
- Michael Kinney as Coach Darryl Armstrong (2 episodes)
- Elle Downs as Mrs. Powers (1 episode)
- Sterling Jarvis as Mr. Powers (1 episode)
- Cheri Maracle as Ms. Cardinal (1 episode)
- Tom Melissis as Mr. Dom Perino (1 episode)

==== Students & Guest Stars ====
- Clarissa Anson as Kara (4 episodes)

== Production ==
After the cancellation of Degrassi's 14-season run on TeenNick, Nickelodeon passed on the pitch for Degrassi: Next Class. This reboot of the series was later picked up by Netflix and is considered a stand-alone series for a new generation—a new incarnation. This season was filmed along with season 1. The show was given a 20 episode order with the episodes being split into two seasons on Netflix and Family. Filming for the two seasons began in June 2015 and wrapped early September the same year.

This season featured the 500th episode of the Degrassi franchise which in turn featured an alumni reunion with characters from Degrassi: The Next Generation. Confirmed guest appearances are Adamo Ruggiero as Marco Del Rossi, Miriam McDonald as Emma Nelson, Lauren Collins as Paige Michalchuk, Shane Kippel as Gavin "Spinner" Mason, and Sarah Barrable-Tishauer as Liberty Van Zandt. Several others are also expected to return. Appearing throughout the season will be former cast member Jamie Johnston who portrayed Peter Stone from seasons five through ten of Degrassi: The Next Generation. He first appears in the premiere.

During May 2016, Australian network ABC3 began releasing episode titles and descriptions for this season, two months before its premiere in the United States and Canada. A week after the first season concluded on the network, it began airing this season on May 30, 2016. This will be the first time in the Degrassi franchise history that an entire season airs in a foreign country before its release in Canada and the U.S. The season will run for 2 weeks on ABC3 and use the telenovela/soap opera format incorporated in the later seasons of Degrassi.

In Canada, the season premiered on July 19, 2016, on Family Channel's F2N block. Unlike the previous season, it will air for 10-weeks and move to Tuesday's at 9:45 PM ET/PT. Also, due to the season premiering in Australia beforehand, Family released the entire season on July 22, 2016, on its subscription-based Family Channel App alongside Netflix's release.

== Episodes ==
No. overall	No. in season	Title	Directed by	Written by	Canadian airdate	Netflix Release	Prod. code
11	1	"#SquadGoals"	Stefan Brogren	Courtney Jane Walker	July 19, 2016	July 22, 2016	201
As the Spring semester begins, Frankie lands the volleyball team in hot water as she retaliates to a rival team's prank. After finding the gun on Hunter, Miles realizes that he needs to step up as a big brother. Maya tries to get back together with Zig, but it could threaten her Co-op opportunity. Note: This episode aired in Australia on May 30, 2016.
12	2	"#TurntUp"	Stefan Brogren	Courtney Jane Walker	July 26, 2016	July 22, 2016	202
Hunter comes to the reality that he must get professional help. Shay is on the fence on weather to defend Frankie or not. Fed up with anger, Zig begins to blame Maya for their recent issues. Note: This episode aired in Australia on May 31, 2016.
13	3	"#CheckYourPrivilege"	Phil Earnshaw	Cole Bastedo	August 2, 2016	July 22, 2016	203
Trying to mend fences, Frankie hosts a diversity mixer to fix things with Northern Tech team. Worried about pressuring Miles and their relationship, Tristan takes over an assignment that they are partners on. When Yael's app becomes a success, she is forced to choose between her integrity or her success. Note: This episode aired in Australia on June 1, 2016.
14	4	"#BuyMePizza"	Phil Earnshaw	Alejandro Alcoba & Ian MacIntyre	August 9, 2016	July 22, 2016	204
Zoe continues to hide her true self after not receiving a call back. Grace gives herself a makeover. After Tiny gets Lola to delete a dating app, it leads to devastating results. Note: This episode aired in Australia on June 2, 2016.
15	5	"#ThrowBackThursday"	Phil Earnshaw	Matt Huether	August 16, 2016	July 22, 2016	205
Racial tensions at Degrassi reach an all-time high as a protest clashes with the annual Degrassi Alumni event. After being kicked off the team, Frankie tries to look for ways to help change people's perception of her. Note: This is the 500th episode of the Degrassi franchise and features several guest stars from previous seasons of Degrassi: The Next Generation. Guest stars include: Raymond Ablack as Sav Bhandari, Charlotte Arnold as Holly J. Sinclair, Sarah Barrable-Tishauer as Liberty Van Zandt, Lauren Collins as Paige Michalchuk, Jake Epstein as Craig Manning, Jamie Johnston as Peter Stone, Shane Kippel as Spinner Mason, Miriam McDonald as Emma Nelson-Mason, Adamo Ruggiero as Marco Del Rossi, and Jacob Neayem as Mo Mashkour. Note: This episode aired in Australia on June 3, 2016.
16	6	"#ToMyFutureSelf"	Phil Earnshaw	Matt Huether	August 23, 2016	July 22, 2016	206
When Shay is offered a dream of a lifetime, she is forced to compromise her morals in order to achieve it. When Grace begins spending more time with Zig, Maya decides to pursue a friendship with Peter. Zoe's rivalry with Esme comes into play while working on a school project with Winston. Note: This episode aired in Australia on June 6, 2016.
17	7	"#ThatAwkwardMomentWhen"	Rt!	Courtney Jane Walker	August 30, 2016	July 22, 2016	207
Frankie tries to escape from her problems by driving off with Jonah, but soon realises that running away isn't always a solution. A suffering Tiny takes Shay's advice over Lola's. Zoë takes a friendly competition with Miles & Tristan too far, resulting in Winston questioning their relationship. Note: This episode aired in Australia on June 7, 2016.
18	8	"#RiseAndGrind"	Rt!	Matt Huether	September 6, 2016	July 22, 2016	208
Miles and Tristan run into relationship troubles when they disagree on the importance of sex. When a dancing opportunity presents itself to Zig, he's eager to prove himself and turns to Esme for help. Meanwhile, when Maya asks Vijay to take down his cover of her song, he responds online. Note: This episode aired in Australia on June 8, 2016.
19	9	"#TheseAreMyConfessions"	Rt!	Sarah Glinski	September 13, 2016	July 22, 2016	209
Grace confesses to having feelings for Zig during a party in the woods. To win Volleyball City Finals, Shay realises that they need Frankie, but wonders if she can forgive her. Yael must go on a date with Baaz due to him winning a bet, although she is reluctant. Note: This episode aired in Australia on June 9, 2016.
20	10	"#OMFG"	Rt!	Sarah Glinski	September 20, 2016	July 22, 2016	210
As the final volleyball game of the year approaches, it is a day that no one will forget when relationships are challenged, secrets are revealed, and a tragedy unfolds that leaves everyone in grief. Note: This episode aired in Australia on June 10, 2016.

^Note 1: ABC3 in Australia aired the season before both Family Channel in Canada and Netflix internationally.
