= Degrassi: Next Class season 3 =

Degrassi: Next Class
- Season 3
- No. of episodes: 10

Release
- Original network: Family (Canada); Netflix (Internationally)
- Original release: January 9 – January 20, 2017

Season chronology
- ← Previous; Season 2 Next → Season 4

The third season of Degrassi: Next Class premiered on January 9, 2017, on Family Channel under the teen block F2N in Canada and began streaming internationally on January 6, 2017, on Netflix.

== Synopsis ==
This season continues to follow the same group of students now as upperclassmen as they begin their junior and senior year. It will also continue to tell the stories of high school drama with groundbreaking stories such as sex, abortion, immigration, depression, oppositional defiant disorder, major depressive, traumatic brain injury, dysfunctional families, sexuality, homophobia, hormones, religion, protest, disabilities, cystic fibrosis, Teen pregnancy and suicide attempts.

== Cast ==
=== Series regulars ===
The third season has twenty-one actors receiving star billing with all nineteen of them returning from the previous season. Those in bold are new to the cast this season.

- Amanda Arcuri as Lola Pacini (9 episodes)
- Amir Bageria as Baaz Nahir (6 episodes)
- Soma Bhatia as Goldi Nahir (7 episodes)
- Jamie Bloch as Yael Baron (7 episodes)
- Stefan Brogren as Principal Archie "Snake" Simpson (2 episodes)
- Chelsea Clark as Esme Song (7 episodes)
- Reiya Downs as Shaylynn "Shay" Powers (7 episodes)
- Ana Golja as Zoë Rivas (8 episodes)
- Nikki Gould as Grace Cardinal (10 episodes)
- Ricardo Hoyos as Zigmund "Zig" Novak (7 episodes)
- Ehren Kassam as Jonah Haak (10 episodes)
- André Kim as Winston "Chewy" Chu (5 episodes)
- Lyle Lettau as Tristan Milligan (7 episodes)
- Spencer MacPherson as Hunter Hollingsworth (6 episodes)
- Eric Osborne as Miles Hollingsworth III (9 episodes)
- **Parham Rownaghi as Saad Al'Maliki** (6 episodes)
- Dante Scott as Vijay Maraj (5 episodes)
- Olivia Scriven as Maya Matlin (8 episodes)
- Sara Waisglass as Francesca "Frankie" Hollingsworth (9 episodes)
- Richard Walters as Deon "Tiny" Bell (7 episodes)
- **Dalia Yegavian as Rasha Zuabi** (8 episodes)

=== Supporting cast ===
==== Parents ====
- Kate Hewlett as Margaret Matlin (5 episodes)
- America Olivo as Ms. Consuela Rivas (3 episodes)
- **Nahanni Johnstone as Mrs. Milligan** (3 episodes)
- **Booth Savage as Phillip Hawthorne** (2 episodes)
- Cheri Maracle as Ms. Cardinal (1 episode)

==== Faculty ====
- Tom Melissis as Mr. Dom Perino (4 episodes)
- Michael Kinney as Coach Darryl Armstrong (3 episodes)
- Aisha Alfa as Ms. Grell (3 episodes)
- Michael Brown as Mr. Blake Mitchell (1 episode)
- Ashley Comeau as Ms. Badger (1 episode)

==== Alumni & Guest Stars ====
- Tariq Azees as Syrian Male Student (6 episodes)
- Kyle Marasciulo as Mitchel Kirkwood (2 episodes)
- Chloe Rose as Katie Matlin (2 episodes)
- Paula MacPherson as Dr. Narello (2 episodes)
- Vivianne Collins as Interviewer (1 episode)
- Ken MacDougall as Driving Examiner (1 episode)
- Naja Stanford as Eve (1 episode)
- Glenda Braganza as Cystic Fibrosis Doctor (1 episode)
- Jane Johanson as Clinic Nurse (1 episode)
- Glen Michael Grant as Dr. Bainford (1 episode)

== Production ==
This season along with season 4 were renewed in April 2016. Production on the season officially began a month prior when casting calls for two new leads were released. Filming commenced in May 2016 and finished in August of the same year. The season is expected to premiere on January 6, 2017, on Netflix internationally and on January 9, 2017, on Family Channel's 'F2N' teen block. On F2N, it will run for two weeks and use the telenovela format. The season premiered at midnight on January 6, 2017, on the Family Channel App.

== Episodes ==
No. overall	No. in season	Title	Directed by	Written by	Original release date	Netflix Release	Prod. code
21	1	"#BreakTheInternet"	Stefan Brogren	Matt Huether	January 9, 2017	January 6, 2017	301
Nearly 5 months after the bus crash, two students are still affected. Zoë takes a brave step. A jealous Lola lashes out.
22	2	"#IWokeUpLikeThis"	Stefan Brogren	Matt Huether	January 10, 2017	January 6, 2017	302
The Gamer club's plan to attract more female viewers backfires. Maya discovers an interest in "tragedy porn". Esme reveals to Zig a dark burden she's carrying.
23	3	"#WorstGiftEver"	Stefan Brogren	Alejandro Alcoba	January 11, 2017	January 6, 2017	303
Shay suffers a feminine mishap. Jonah and Grace pitch the Student Council on a play about the bus accident while Miles finds it hard to continue visiting Tristan. Goldi struggles with being a Muslim in a largely non-Muslim culture.
24	4	"#PicsOrItDidntHappen"	Stefan Brogren	Alejandro Alcoba	January 12, 2017	January 6, 2017	304
Frankie feels Jonah is hiding something. Maya meets a student who shares her dark interests.
25	5	"#HugeIfTrue"	Phil Earnshaw	Courtney Jane Walker	January 13, 2017	January 6, 2017	305
Hunter, Vijay, and Baaz decide to see how they measure up to one another while a girls' night turns into a coed party and leads to an unexpected hookup.
26	6	"#ThatFeelingWhen"	Phil Earnshaw	Jennifer Kassabian	January 16, 2017	January 6, 2017	306
Zoë and Winston vie for a date with Rasha. A development at the hospital stresses out Miles. An insecure Frankie finds herself stalking Jonah.
27	7	"#Unsubscribe"	Phil Earnshaw	Ian MacIntyre	January 17, 2017	January 6, 2017	307
Grace faces a difficult decision about her health. Rasha's first date goes awry. Hunter suffers an embarrassment. Zoë is caught in an intimate moment.
28	8	"#IRegretNothing"	Phil Earnshaw	Sarah Glinski	January 18, 2017	January 6, 2017	308
Lola finds herself in a problem that she needs a controversial solution to. Tristan makes progress, while Maya's mental health continues to spiral. Miles worries the play might be too revealing.
29	9	"#Woke"	Stefan Brogren	Sarah Glinski	January 19, 2017	January 6, 2017	309
Maya comes up with a plan to stop her hurtful behavior. Zoë makes a bold statement at her mom's wedding. Frankie is caught violating others' privacy.
30	10	"#ImSleep"	Stefan Brogren	Matt Huether	January 20, 2017	January 6, 2017	310
Tristan goes to see the school play. Rasha and Zoë make startling confessions. A student sets in motion a plan that yields fatal results.
