= Degrassi: Next Class season 1 =

Degrassi: Next Class
- Season 1
- No. of episodes: 10

Release
- Original network: Family (Canada); Netflix (International)
- Original release: January 4 – January 15, 2016

Season chronology
- ← Previous; Degrassi (fourteen) Next → Season 2

The first season of Degrassi: Next Class (previously known as Degrassi) premiered on January 4, 2016, in Canada and was released on January 15, 2016, internationally. It was the first season to air on Family in Canada and on Netflix internationally.

This season follows a group of high school sophomores and juniors from Degrassi Community School, a fictional school in Toronto, Ontario, and depicts some of the typical issues and challenges common to a teenager's life. This season will depict a new school year after the previous seniors, some of whom debuted during "The Next Generation", graduated in the previous season. This season will feature another rebranding for the series and is being considered a stand-alone series.

== Synopsis ==
This series is a continuum from Degrassi: Next generation as it follows the remaining underclassmen along with few new students as they enter their sophomore and junior year. This series dives into serious and dark topic that affect the new generation of viewers watching otherwise known as Gen Z. Issues such as Cystic fibrosis, Racial discrimination, Sexuality, Islamophobia, Immigration, Cyberbullying, mental illness, school shootings and social media.

== Cast ==
=== Series regulars ===
The first season has nineteen actors receiving star billing with fourteen of them returning from the previous series. Those in bold are new to the cast this season:

- Amanda Arcuri as Lola Pacini (9 episodes)
- **Amir Bageria as Baaz Nahir** (5 episodes)
- **Soma Bhatia as Goldi Nahir** (5 episodes)
- **Jamie Bloch as Yael Baron** (6 episodes)
- Stefan Brogren as Archie "Snake" Simpson (3 episodes)
- **Chelsea Clark as Esme Song** (7 episodes)
- Reiya Downs as Shaylynn "Shay" Powers (8 episodes)
- Ana Golja as Zoë Rivas (8 episodes)
- Nikki Gould as Grace Cardinal (10 episodes)
- Ricardo Hoyos as Zigmund "Zig" Novak (10 episodes)
- Ehren Kassam as Jonah Haak (9 episodes)
- André Kim as Winston "Chewy" Chu (10 episodes)
- Lyle Lettau as Tristan Milligan (9 episodes)
- Spencer MacPherson as Hunter Hollingsworth (8 episodes)
- Eric Osborne as Miles Hollingsworth III (10 episodes)
- **Dante Scott as Vijay Maraj** (7 episodes)
- Olivia Scriven as Maya Matlin (10 episodes)
- Sara Waisglass as Francesca "Frankie" Hollingsworth (10 episodes)
- Richard Walters as Deon "Tiny" Bell (9 episodes)

=== Supporting cast ===
==== Parents ====
- Stephanie Moore as Mrs. Diana Hollingsworth (6 episodes)
- Kate Hewlett as Mrs. Margaret Matlin (4 episodes)
- John Ralston as Mr. Miles Hollingsworth II (2 episodes)
- **Cheri Maracle as Ms. Cardinal** (2 episodes)
- **Elle Downs as Mrs. Powers** (1 episode)
- **Sterling Jarvis as Mr. Powers** (1 episode)
- America Olivo as Ms. Consuela Rivas (1 episode)

==== Faculty ====
- **Michael Brown as Mr. Blake Mitchell** (5 episodes)
- **Pay Chen as Mrs. Lin** (3 episodes)
- **Ashley Comeau as Ms. Badger** (2 episodes)
- Michael Kinney as Coach Darryl Armstrong (2 episodes)
- Aisha Alfa as Ms. Grell (1 episode)
- Tom Melissis as Mr. Dom Perino (1 episode)

== Production ==
After the cancellation of Degrassi's 14-season run on TeenNick, Nickelodeon passed on the pitch for "Degrassi: Next Class". This reboot of the series was later picked up by Netflix and is considered a stand-alone series for a new generation—a new incarnation. This season was filmed along with season 2. The show was given a 20 episode order with the episodes being split into two seasons on Netflix and Family. Series stars' Amir Bageria and Stefan Brogren, confirmed this before the airing of episode 10. F2N and Degrassi are also advertising episode 10 as the season finale of season 1. Filming for the two seasons began in June 2015 and wrapped early September the same year.

== Episodes ==
No. overall	No. in season	Title	Directed by	Written by	Canadian airdate	Netflix Release	Prod. code
1	1	"#BootyCall"	Stefan Brogren	Courtney Jane Walker	January 4, 2016	January 15, 2016	101
It is the start of a new school year at Degrassi. Maya searches for a lead guitarist. After recruiting Grace, she is able to get Jonah to join, much to Zig's dismay. Meanwhile, Shay experiments with enhancing her assets to impress her crush, Tiny. However, she realizes that he likes her for who she is. As Zoë attempts to put her "more than friends" feelings for Grace aside, things get personal for Tristan when he runs for class president against ex-boyfriend Miles. After a shocking discovery in the presidential election campaign, Tristan is elected. Note: First appearance of Soma Bhatia as Goldi Nahir, Jamie Bloch as Yael Baron, and Dante Scott as Vijay Maraj.
2	2	"#NoFilter"	Stefan Brogren	Courtney Jane Walker	January 5, 2016	January 15, 2016	102
Zoë and Grace are assigned together for a group project, making them wonder where they'll be 15 years from now. However, Zoe learns that Grace has serious illness and tries to comfort her. Miles learns that his mother is with a new man. At school, his anger leads to words that express concern to all. They seem to reconcile. But when his mom reveals who the new man is, it could push Miles away. Frankie, still reeling from her breakup with Winston, dyes her hair. Lola and Shay are worried that she could be depressed. As they continue to advoate their concerns, Frankie pushes away from them and confides in a boy she meets online. However, she learns he isn't all that he seems to be. Note: First appearance of Chelsea Clark as Esme Song.
3	3	"#YesMeansYes"	Stefan Brogren	Alejandro Alcoba	January 6, 2016	January 15, 2016	103
As Miles continues to deal with shocking news from his mother, mysterious girl Esme suggests they find dirt on his father. Regardless of Winston's reservations, Miles teams up with her to prove his dad hasn't changed. After a humiliating basketball game in gym class, Hunter pitches a Game Club to Student Council. Although Tristan and Zoë are hesitant about it, they accept his proposal. Meanwhile, Maya and Jonah continue to work on music for their band. As Zig continues to become more insecure about his relationship with Maya, Tiny suggests they become more intimate. However, things don't go as planned. This leads for Zig and Maya to have an uncomfortable conversation. Note: First appearance of Amir Bageria as Baaz Nahir.
4	4	"#NotOkay"	Stefan Brogren	Alejandro Alcoba	January 7, 2016	January 15, 2016	104
Maya is able to book a gig for her band, but when her mom learns it is at a club, she says no. Hell bent on being heard, Maya sneaks out with the help of Zig. However, she experiences sexist micro-aggression at the club and decides to fight back. After Winston informs Tristan of Miles' new relationship with Esme, he starts to become jealous. Eventually, he decides to pursue a new romance with Vijay, a grade ten student who is in awe over him. But after an encounter with Miles and Esme, Vijay soon realizes Tristan isn't over him. When Tiny asks Shay out, she is hesitant. Although Lola and Frankie convince her to move forward with the date, she realizes that her parents need to know about the boy she wants to date. Worried aout her future, she turns Tiny down, much to Lola's interest. A heart-broken Shay allows Lola to go for it.
5	5	"#ButThatsNoneOfMyBusiness"	Eleanor Lindo	Matt Huether	January 8, 2016	January 15, 2016	105
Miles learns that his short stories are becoming a success. However, he soon learns he is going to spend time with his dad. When Winston expresses his concern, Miles stops taking them. After a panic attack, Esme helps Miles raid the locker room for meds. At the gaming event, Yael, Hunter, Vijay, and Baaz qualify and win. However, the event turns sour when he takes one too many pills. After an embarrassing encounter with Tiny's friends, Lola asks Shay and Frankie about masturbation. When a strange incident occurs, Lola sees a specialist about a potential problem down there. News spread around the school about Maya's feminist move last week. Goldi recruits Maya and Grace to be a part of the Feminist Club. After Zig shows unease with the idea, she decides to quit. However, she soon learns that she IS a feminist and willing to fight for equal rights.
6	6	"#NotAllMen"	Eleanor Lindo	Matt Huether	January 11, 2016	January 15, 2016	106
Zoë learns that her mother has a prejudice against gay people. Out of fear that no one will accept her, and inspiration from Tristan, she decides to team up with Grace to find her father. Unfortunately, she learns that man she found isn't who he seems to be. A struggling Frankie is approached by Jonah with an opportunity to help others with serious issues. After getting advice from Shay, she decides to help. However, she drops last minute to help Shay not be a third wheel with Lola and Tiny. When the gaming club wins, Hunter decides to update their technology. However, he runs into a problem: the Feminist Club, led by Maya and Goldi, say their game is misogynistic and wants it shut down. Hunter breaks down and calls out Maya, Zig, and Goldi. This leads for the club to be shut down. Hunter tells the club that he wants revenge.
7	7	"#ThisCouldBeUsButYouPlayin"	Eleanor Lindo	Sarah Glinski	January 12, 2016	January 15, 2016	107
Maya is given the chance to meet with a music producer in New York. Maya, Jonah, and her mother head to New York. When Zig learns Grace can't go, he starts to become concerned. Miles finds himself in front of the school, not remembering anything that happened the night before. Meanwhile, Zoë talks with Tristan about the kiss with Grace. Her and Grace discuss what happened. In New York, Jonah and Maya work on their music. Esme tells Miles about what happened the night before and supplies him with more drugs. During their "date", Zig interrupts Grace and Zoë. He feels insecure and worried about Maya. Miles learns that he sent inappropriate messages to Lola, from Tiny. Grace confronts Zoë by telling her she is not gay. Distraught, Zoë comforts Grace's crush, Zig, and kisses him. Following an incident, Miles accepts help from the doctors and his mother. He decides to cut off Esme, which doesn't sit well with her. Zoë shows Grace the video of her and Zig kissing.
8	8	"#TeamFollowBack"	Eleanor Lindo	Ian MacIntyre	January 13, 2016	January 15, 2016	108
Frankie considers going out with Winston again. Lola and Shay convince her to go for it. But, after making a pro's and con's list about Winston, she may have ruined her chances. Meanwhile, Tristan fears he may have something, after an awkward encounter. Zoë helps him by Internet diagnoses him with chlamydia. This forces him to confront the guys he is hooked up with, both Miles and Vijay. After confronting Miles, Tristan makes a risky gamble. Goldi announces that Maya and Zig will perform a skit at the assembly. She receives messages of people trolling her. News about this spreads around the school. After being doxxed, Maya decides to perform from home. But things go wrong when a swatting occurs and endangers both Zig and Maya.
9	9	"#SinceWeBeinHonest"	Stefan Brogren	Alejandro Alcoba	January 14, 2016	January 15, 2016	109
Maya continues to deal with the aftermath of the swatting. Zig confides in Tiny about what he did. He soon learns who the troll is: Hunter and Baaz. After a confrontation, Hunter blackmails him into staying quiet. Or else he'll tell Maya about his make-out session with Zoë. Zig tells Maya who the troll is and tells her that he made-out with Zoë. After a confusing dream, Frankie considers her two suitors with the help of Lola and Shay. Lola and Shay learn that she is into Jonah. Although Frankie wants to be Jonah, she decides to go with Winston. Meanwhile, Miles works to get better by trying to make amends with Tristan. He soon notices Esme in trouble. After class, she admits that she tried to hurt herself. He soon learns that it was a lie to try and get back with him.
10	10	"#SorryNotSorry"	Stefan Brogren	Sarah Glinski	January 15, 2016	January 15, 2016	110
After Maya finishes performing at the Snowball, Zig offers to talk with her. He is hopeful when all of a sudden, the school is put into lockdown for reasons unknown. Earlier that day, Frankie has to decide what she wants to wear for the dance tonight when she gets flowers. Zoë and Tristan learn that Miles is going to boarding school next semester. The Gaming Club expose themselves as Maya's trolls to Principal Simpson and Maya. All but Hunter are sorry. Frankie learns who was behind the gift and turns down Winston. Upset, Hunter confronts his friends and shoves Yael. Maya confronts Grace and learns she knew the secret. At home, Hunter breaks down and makes a list: Maya, Zig, Tristan, Goldi, Vijay, Baaz, Yael. At the dance, Lola learns Shay is not over Tiny. Miles and Winston find the list and worry he may have taken their father's gun. Hunter tries to make up with Yael, but to no avail. After Maya finishes performing, Zig offers to talk with her. He is hopeful when all of a sudden, the school is put into lockdown. Maya and Zoë are stuck in the restroom; Lola, Frankie, and Shay are stuck in a corner; Hunter, Zig, Tristan, and Goldi are stuck together. Tristan receives shocking messages from Miles. Maya learns a new perspective between Zoë and Zig. Shay, Lola, and Frankie make up. Miles is able to calm down Hunter. The lockdown is over. Maya turns Zig down and states that they are over. Miles tells Tristan he called the lockdown out of fear. Maya and Grace make up. Frankie dances with Jonah. At home, it is revealed that Hunter did take his father's gun and was planning to do something. Miles consoles him.
