= Degrassi: Next Class season 4 =

Degrassi: Next Class
- Season 4
- No. of episodes: 10

Release
- Original network: Family (Canada); Netflix (Internationally)
- Original release: Family Channel App June 30, 2017; F2N July 3, 2017 – July 14, 2017

Season chronology
- ← Previous; Season 3

The fourth and final season of Degrassi: Next Class was released on June 30, 2017, on the Family Channel App ahead of its television premiere on July 3, 2017, on Family Channel under the teen block F2N in Canada. It streamed internationally on July 7, 2017, through Netflix.

== Synopsis ==
Still following the same group of high school juniors and seniors from Degrassi Community School, this season focuses on the final months of the school year as the upperclassmen still face the numerous challenges that await them inside the hallways. Controversial topics including mental health, major depressive disorder, oppositional defiant disorder, cystic fibrosis, gender identity, sexual identity, acceptance, faith, terrorism, disabilities, sex, and hate crimes.

== Cast ==
=== Series regulars ===
The fourth season has twenty-one actors receiving star billing with all twenty-one of them returning from the previous season.

- Amanda Arcuri as Lola Pacini (10 episodes)
- Amir Bageria as Baaz Nahir (7 episodes)
- Soma Bhatia as Goldi Nahir (8 episodes)
- Jamie Bloch as Yael Baron (8 episodes)
- Stefan Brogren as Archie "Snake" Simpson (1 episode)
- Chelsea Clark as Esme Song (9 episodes)
- Reiya Downs as Shaylynn "Shay" Powers (6 episodes)
- Ana Golja as Zoë Rivas (8 episodes)
- Nikki Gould as Grace Cardinal (10 episodes)
- Ricardo Hoyos as Zigmund "Zig" Novak (9 episodes)
- Ehren Kassam as Jonah Haak (10 episodes)
- André Kim as Winston "Chewy" Chu (7 episodes)
- Lyle Lettau as Tristan Milligan (7 episodes)
- Spencer MacPherson as Hunter Hollingsworth (9 episodes)
- Eric Osborne as Miles Hollingsworth III (6 episodes)
- Parham Rownaghi as Saad Al' Maliki (6 episodes)
- Dante Scott as Vijay Maraj (7 episodes)
- Olivia Scriven as Maya Matlin (7 episodes)
- Sara Waisglass as Francesca "Frankie" Hollingsworth (9 episodes)
- Richard Walters as Deon "Tiny" Bell (8 episodes)
- Dalia Yegavian as Rasha Zuabi (8 episodes)

=== Guest stars ===
==== Alumni ====
- Jake Epstein as Craig Manning (1 episode)
- Chloe Rose as Katie Matlin (1 episode)

==== New students ====
- Diya Kittur as Abra Al' Maliki (2 episodes)

==== Parents and faculty ====
- Aisha Alfa as Ms. Grell (4 episodes)
- Michael Brown as Mr. Blake Mitchell (2 episodes)
- John Ralston as Mr. Miles Hollingsworth II (2 episodes)
- Tom Melissis as Mr. Dom Perino (2 episodes)
- Ashley Comeau as Ms. Badger (1 episode)
- Elle Downs as Mrs. Powers (1 episode)
- Janick Hébert as Madame Jean-aux (1 episode)
- Nahanni Johnstone as Mrs. Milligan (1 episode)
- Michael Kinney as Coach Darryl Armstrong (1 episode)
- Cheri Maracle as Ms. Cardinal (1 episode)
- Vijay Mehta as Mr. Nahir (1 episode)
- Stephanie Moore as Mrs. Diana Hollingsworth (1 episode)
- Booth Savage as Phillip Hawthorne (1 episode)

==== Guest stars ====
- Charlie Gillespie as Oliver (2 episodes)

== Production ==
This season along with season 3 were renewed in April 2016. Production on the season officially began a month prior when casting calls for two new leads were released. Filming for season 3 & 4 were filmed back-to-back, which ended in August 2016. The season premiered on July 3, 2017, on Family Channel's 'F2N' teen block, and streamed internationally on Netflix on July 7, 2017. On F2N, it will run for two weeks and use the telenovela format. Ahead of the premiere on F2N, Family Channel released all 10 episodes on June 30, 2017, on the Family Channel App at midnight.

This season featured the first graduation for Degrassi: Next Class. Ten characters, the largest since Degrassi High, graduated in the finale of season four. These characters are: Deon "Tiny" Bell (Richard Walters), Grace Cardinal (Nikki Gould), Winston "Chewy" Chu (André Dae Kim), Jonah Haak (Ehren Kassam), Miles Hollingsworth III (Eric Osborne), Maya Matlin (Olivia Scriven), Tristan Milligan (Lyle Lettau), Goldi Nahir (Soma Bhatia), Zig Novak (Ricardo Hoyos) and Zoë Rivas (Ana Golja). The finale revealed that fellow senior Esme Song (Chelsea Clark) would not be graduating.

== Episodes ==
No. overall	No. in season	Title	Directed by	Written by	Original release date	Netflix Release	Prod. code
31	1	"#BackToReality"	Stefan Brogren	Alejandro Alcoba	June 30, 2017	July 7, 2017	401
32	2	"#GetMoney"	Stefan Brogren	Courtney Jane Walker	June 30, 2017	July 7, 2017	402
With the help of Esme, Frankie begins to grow her social platform. Shay is determined to up her game to get scouted. A series of miscommunication has Lola making a critical error.
33	3	"#ILookLikeA"	Samir Rehem	Ian MacIntyre	June 30, 2017	July 7, 2017	403
Goldi has been flirting with Winston and doesn't even know it. Miles questions a post-grad opportunity that seems too good to be true.
34	4	"#RollUpToTheClubLike"	Samir Rehem	Matt Huether	June 30, 2017	July 7, 2017	404
Grace decides to write up a bucket list. Maya rediscovers the fun in music. A terrorist attack overseas puts Goldi in a scary situation close to home.
35	5	"#Preach"	Samir Rehem	Jennifer Kassabian	June 30, 2017	July 7, 2017	405
Saad is torn between his own beliefs and the students' collective show of solidarity for Brussels. Frankie wonders if hanging with Esme and Zig is really good for her.
36	6	"#FactsOnly"	Samir Rehem	Courtney Jane Walker	June 30, 2017	July 7, 2017	406
Yael feels like an identity overhaul is needed and turns to Lola for help. Maya auditions for Zoë, Goldi and a special celebrity judge and old face returns to Degrassi.
37	7	"#Fire"	Stefan Brogren	Courtney Jane Walker	June 30, 2017	July 7, 2017	407
A small senior class camping trip begins to spiral into disaster when Esme, Lola, Frankie, and Shay crash the party.
38	8	"#GetYouAManThatCanDoBoth"	Stefan Brogren	Matt Huether & Celeste Bronfman	June 30, 2017	July 7, 2017	408
Tristan and others wonder if his turbo-mode recovery is a good idea. After seeing others get "promposals," Shay is hoping that Tiny will do the same.
39	9	"#Obsessed"	Stefan Brogren	Sarah Glinski	June 30, 2017	July 7, 2017	409
Prom has arrived, but it's not a degrassi celebration unless it's filled with bomb threats, false arrests, injuries, and bombshells.
40	10	"#KThxBye"	Stefan Brogren	Sarah Glinski	June 30, 2017	July 7, 2017	410
The gowns are on and the caps are about to be thrown. Degrassi holds its graduation for the Class of 2017. Zoë wonders how much support she'll get as she prepares to make her valedictory speech. Following the accident at prom, Zig comes to a serious realization. Tristan and Miles make life altering decisions about their future. Sadd finds himself in serious legal trouble.. Note: This marks the final regular appearances of Richard Walters as Deon "Tiny" Bell, Nikki Gould as Grace Cardinal, André Dae Kim as Winston "Chewy" Chu, Ehren Kassam as Jonah Haak, Eric Osborne as Miles Hollingsworth III, Olivia Scriven as Maya Matlin, Lyle Lettau as Tristan Milligan, Soma Bhatia as Goldi Nahir, Ricardo Hoyos as Zig Novak and Ana Golja as Zoë Rivas.
