= List of Degrassi: Next Class characters =

Degrassi: Next Class is a Canadian teen drama television series primarily created by Linda Schuyler. The fifth entry in the Degrassi franchise created by Schuyler and Kit Hood, it is a direct continuation of the fourth series Degrassi: The Next Generation. It was released on Netflix internationally in January 2016.

The following is a list of characters who have appeared in the series.

== Appearances ==
Main cast
Recurring guest star (3+ episodes)
Guest star (1–2 episodes)

Actor	Character	Seasons			
Actor	Character	1	2	3	4
Main cast
Amanda Arcuri	Lola Pacini	M	M	M	M
Amir Bageria	Baaz Nahir	M	M	M	M
Jamie Bloch	Yael Baron	M	M	M	M
Stefan Brogren	Principal Archie "Snake" Simpson	M	M	M	M
Soma Bhatia	Goldi Nahir	M	M	M	M
Chelsea Clark	Esme Song	M	M	M	M
Reiya Downs	Shaylynn "Shay" Powers	M	M	M	M
Ana Golja	Zoë Rivas	M	M	M	M
Nikki Gould	Grace Cardinal	M	M	M	M
Ricardo Hoyos	Zigmund "Zig" Novak	M	M	M	M
Ehren Kassam	Jonah Haak	M	M	M	M
André Dae Kim	Winston "Chewy" Chu	M	M	M	M
Lyle Lettau	Tristan Milligan	M	M	M	M
Spencer MacPherson	Hunter Hollingsworth	M	M	M	M
Eric Osborne	Miles Hollingsworth III	M	M	M	M
Dante Scott	Vijay Maraj	M	M	M	M
Olivia Scriven	Maya Matlin	M	M	M	M
Sara Waisglass	Francesca "Frankie" Hollingsworth	M	M	M	M
Richard Walters	Deon "Tiny" Bell	M	M	M	M
Parham Rownaghi	Saad Al'Maliki			M	M
Dalia Yegavian	Rasha Zuabi			M	M
Returning from Degrassi: The Next Generation
Miriam McDonald	Emma Nelson		G		
Sarah Barrable-Tishauer	Liberty Van Zandt		G		
Shane Kippel	Gavin "Spinner" Mason		G		
Lauren Collins	Paige Michalchuk		G		
Jake Epstein	Craig Manning		G		G
Adamo Ruggiero	Marco Del Rossi		G		
Jamie Johnston	Peter Stone		R		
Charlotte Arnold	Holly J. Sinclair		G		
Raymond Ablack	Sav Bhandari		G		
Jacob Neayem	Mo Mashkour		G		
Chloe Rose	Katie Matlin			G	G

== Main characters ==
The following actors have all received star billing and are listed as "starring" after the opening theme song of Degrassi: Next Class.

- A regular is an actor who is credited as "starring" after the opening theme song of the show in any given season. Actors are only credited for the episodes for which they appear in.
- A recurring status is given to actors who are not listed as "starring", but appear in two or more episodes of any particular season.
- A guest appearance by an actor means they are not credited as "starring", but were a guest star in one episode of the season.

=== Students ===
Character name	Portrayed by	Seasons featured
Baaz Nahir	Amir Bageria	1–4 (regular)
Grade 12 (Senior) The younger brother of Goldi, Baaz is a 12th grader who is always looking for new business ventures. He is friends with Hunter, Vijay, and Yael, and together, with Lola, they run a YouTube Channel called All Inclusive, which was made after their gaming club was shut down. Baaz is smart, calculating, and methodical, and his logic often gets in the way of emotional connections.: Baaz has appeared in 24 episodes.
Esme Song	Chelsea Clark	1–4 (regular)
Grade 12 (Senior - REPEAT) Esme is a senior repeating her final year after skipping school for a month. She previously dated Miles, and then dated Zig. She is seen as attention seeking and lives in the moment. She is seen as willing to manipulate a situation or a person in order to get what she wants. However, these antics are rooted in a need for attention, which causes her to lash out. In the season 4 finale, Esme finally accepts that she needs help.: Was supposed to graduate in season 4 with the Class of 2016 but was held back due to her skipping school for a month.; Esme has appeared in 28 episodes.
Francesca "Frankie" Hollingsworth	Sara Waisglass	1–4 (regular)
Grade 12 (Senior) Frankie is the younger sister of Miles, and the twin to Hunter. She is seen trying to be the perfect daughter, and is seen as grounded and intelligent. She dated Jonah Haak, but they broke up when he stopped trusting her. She then dated both Zig and Esme, but the relationship quickly ended when Zig started to realize the extent of Esme's behaviour. Frankie is seen as trying to be the perfect daughter and suffers from being misunderstood.: Has appeared since the 13th season of Degrassi: The Next Generation.; Frankie has appeared in 37 episodes.
Goldi Nahir	Soma Bhatia	1–4 (regular)
Graduate (Class of 2016) An activist and feminist who runs for class president, and though she doesn't win, becomes vice president for her junior and senior years. She is passionate, but sometimes comes off as standoffish to other people. She is attacked in season 3 when she has her hijab removed and struggles with whether or not to wear her hijab, and her Muslim faith. She later begins dating Winston Chu.: Goldi has appeared in 27 episodes including credit only appearances.
Grace Cardinal	Nikki Gould	1–4 (regular)
Graduate (Class of 2016) Grace is a blunt and unapologetic about her opinions, but caring and compassionate when it comes to her friends. In season 1, Grace reveals to Zoe that she has cystic fibrosis, and finally tells her friends in season 2 after passing out. She is best friends with Zoe, despite having a falling out after Zoe kisses Zig, her crush, at the end of season 1. In her senior year, Grace, along with Jonah, put together a play as their way of dealing with the bus crash. Grace and Jonah later end up dating.: Has appeared since the 13th season of Degrassi: The Next Generation.; Grace has appeared in 39 episodes.
Hunter Hollingsworth	Spencer MacPherson	1–4 (regular)
Grade 12 (Senior) The younger brother of Miles, and twin to Frankie, Hunter is a computer gamer, and comic book lover. In season one, Hunter, along with his friend, trolls and cyberbullies Maya. He later brings a gun to the school dance, but is stopped by Miles before doing anything. He is later diagnosed with anger problems and depression. He is seen dating Yael, but they break up after he is unaccepting following their coming out as genderqueer.: Has appeared since the 13th season of the first incarnation.; Hunter has appeared in 29 episodes.
Jonah Haak	Ehren Kassam	1–4 (regular)
Graduate (Class of 2016) Jonah used to be a troublemaker, but saw the light. He dated Frankie, but due to trust issues, they ended up breaking up. He and Grace grow close after working on a play together as their way of dealing with the bus crash.: Has appeared since the 14th season of Degrassi: The Next Generation.; Jonah has appeared in 35 episodes.
Lola Pacini	Amanda Arcuri	1–4 (regular)
Grade 12 (Senior) Lola is an excitable and boy-crazy girl with a vibrant personality. She dates Tiny, which causes a rift in her friendship with Shay, who also had feelings for Tiny. Following this, she dates Miles when Tristan is in a coma. She has an abortion in season three following an affair with Miles, though he does not find out about it until after she has it. She becomes friends with Yael, and helps them when they become confused about their gender identity. She later befriends Saad, a student from Syria. She is seen as best friends with Frankie and Shay.: Has appeared since the 14th season of Degrassi: The Next Generation.; Lola has appeared in 36 episodes.
Maya Matlin	Olivia Scriven	1–4 (regular)
Graduate (Class of 2016) Maya is seen as a musician with a passion for writing songs. She has an on-off relationship with Zig. They date in season one, but break up after ZIg cheats on her with Zoe. She has a co-op in season two and is one of the students in the bus crash. Following the crash, Maya becomes depressed and attempts to kill herself but survives when she is found by Zig and Esme. In season four, Maya is dealing with the aftermath of her depression and struggles with writing music. She is seen as best friends with Grace and Tristan.: Has appeared since the 11th season of Degrassi: The Next Generation.; Maya has appeared in 33 episodes.
Miles Hollingsworth III	Eric Osborne	1–4 (regular)
Graduate (Class of 2016) In season one, Miles deals with the aftermath of his father's abuse. It is discovered that he suffers from anxiety and depression, and he briefly dates Esme but they break up after she gets him addicted to drugs. Miles identifies as bisexual, though it takes him a while for him to label himself. He dates Tristan Milligan, but Tristan breaks up with him because he doesn't want to hold him back. Miles hooks up with Lola following the bus crash putting Tristan in a coma and is seen by his side, supporting him in season four after he wakes up.: Has appeared since the 13th season of Degrassi: The Next Generation.; Miles has appeared in 35 episodes.
Rasha Zuabi	Dalia Yegavian	3–4 (regular)
Grade 12 (Senior) Rasha came to Degrassi from Syria and is currently living with Goldi and her family. She, like Goldi, is Muslim, but chooses not to wear her hijab to school. She eventually dates Zoë Rivas, and they attend prom together, where they win prom queens.: Rasha has appeared in 16 episodes.
Saad Al'Maliki	Parham Rownaghi	3–4 (regular)
Grade 12 (Senior) Saad, like Rasha, is a student from Syria, but unlike her, is unhappy in Canada. He becomes friends with Maya, but is shunned by everyone following her suicide attempt. He is befriended by Lola, who treats him with kindness. He is seen as suffering from home sickness, though he sister does not.: Saad has appeared in 12 episodes.
Shaylynn "Shay" Powers	Reiya Downs	1–4 (regular)
Grade 12 (Senior) Shay is an athlete and straight-A student who tries to be the best student, athlete and daughter. She has conflict with Lola in season one when Lola starts dating Tiny, despite her knowing that Shay liked him. After they break up, she and Tiny start dating. Shay deals with the upcoming pressures of applying for college while also pressure to have sex with her boyfriend, Tiny.: Has appeared since the 14th season of Degrassi: The Next Generation.; Shay has appeared in 30 episodes.
Deon "Tiny" Bell	Richard Walters	1–4 (regular)
Graduate (Class of 2016) Tiny has big dreams for himself, but he also had big troubles in the past. Turning his life around after being in a gang with Zig, he is smart and has huge standards for himself. In Degrassi: The Next Generation, it was revealed that he is the younger brother of drug dealer and gang member Vincent who previously shot Adam at prom.: Has appeared since the 13th season of Degrassi: The Next Generation.; Tiny has appeared in 33 episodes.
Tristan Milligan	Lyle Lettau	1–4 (regular)
Graduate (Class of 2016) Tristan is out, proud, and not afraid to be himself. He is the student council president in his junior year, and has a rift with his ex-boyfriend, Miles. He helps Zoë when she struggles with her sexuality. After him and Miles get back together, he is one of the students on the bus crash, and spends most of season three in a coma. Upon awakening, he is seen in therapy and occasionally at school. He and Miles break up because he didn't want to hold Miles back from doing what he wanted.: Has appeared since the 11th season of Degrassi: The Next Generation.; Tristan has appeared in 31 episodes.
Vijay Maraj	Dante Scott	1–4 (regular)
Grade 12 (Senior) Vijay is a hopeless romantic with a flair for the dramatic. He believes in happy endings, and spends his time vlogging and sharing his covers on YouTube. He's an idealist who's honest, emotional, and who always follows his heart, even though it usually leads him towards heartbreak.: Vijay has appeared in 25 episodes.
Winston "Chewy" Chu	André Dae Kim	1–4 (regular)
Graduate (Class of 2016) Winston is smart and sarcastic and best friends with Miles Hollingsworth III. Winston masks his insecurity with a cynical attitude and self-deprecating sense of humor, which protect him from moving too far out of his comfort zone. He's often the voice of reason and a reluctant co-conspirator in hijinks.: Has appeared since the 13th season of Degrassi: The Next Generation.; Winston has appeared in 31 episodes.
Yael Baron	Jamie Bloch	1–4 (regular)
Grade 12 (Senior) Yael is friends with Hunter, Vijay, and Baaz, and along with them, is involved with the trolling of Maya, but is seen as apologetic. They are interested in Hunter in season one, but grows scared of him following his changing behaviour, though they start dating at the end of season two. In season four, Yael struggles with their gender identity, and later comes out as genderqueer, and uses they/them pronouns. This causes a rift between them and Hunter, who struggles with accepting their identity, causing them to break up.: Yael coming out as non-binary makes them the first non-binary character in the Degrassi franchise.; Yael has appeared in 25 episodes.
Zigmund "Zig" Novak	Ricardo Hoyos	1–4 (regular)
Graduate (Class of 2016) Zig is a handsome and charming guy with a less than ideal home life. Zig dated Maya before they broke up because he cheated on her with Zoe. He later dates Esme, but breaks up with her after realizing her dangerous and manipulative behaviour.: Has appeared since the 11th season of Degrassi: The Next Generation.; Zig has appeared in 35 episodes.
Zoë Rivas	Ana Golja	1–4 (regular)
Graduate (Class of 2016) Zoë is a fierce and fashion forward student and former actor. She struggles with her sexuality, and a crush on best friend, Grace. They hook up, but after Grace reveals that she doesn't have feelings for Zoë, she makes out with Grace's crush, Zig. Zoë then dates Winston Chu and denies her sexuality until the end of season two, when she finally accepts who she is. Following being kicked out by her mother, Zoë proceeds to live with Grace, and starts dating Rasha. She was made valedictorian of the class of 2016.: Has appeared since the 13th season of Degrassi: The Next Generation.; Zoë has appeared in 32 episodes.

=== Adults ===
Character name	Portrayed by	Seasons featured
Archibald "Archie" "Snake" Simpson	Stefan Brogren	1–4 (regular)
Mr. Simpson is the Principal of Degrassi Community School and used to be the Media Immersion teacher. Hailing from Degrassi as an alumnus, Mr. Simpson has a deep love for the school. After several horrible events at the school and a suspension from being Principal for a few months, Simpson returns ready to turn Degrassi around.: Has been credited in every season of the Degrassi franchise, except The Kids of Degrassi Street.; He was the first to say "fuck" on Canadian broadcast television, in the 1992 Degrassi telefilm, School's Out.

== Alumni Guest stars ==
Character name	Portrayed by	Seasons featured
Peter Stone	Jamie Johnston	2 (recurring)
A former student of Degrassi Community School who is now working in a recording studio. He reappears at Degrassi searching for a student for a co-op placement at his studio.: Was a series regular on Degrassi: The Next Generation from season 5 until season 10.; Peter has appeared in 4 episodes.
Katie Matlin	Chloe Rose	3 (recurring), 4 (Guest)
Maya's older sister and a former Degrassi pupil who is currently attending a California University on a soccer scholarship. She returns home after their mother tells her Maya is suffering from depression.: Was a series regular on Degrassi: The Next Generation from season 11 until season 13.; Katie has appeared in 3 episodes.
