= Degrassi: The Next Generation season 9 =

Degrassi: The Next Generation
- Season 9
- Degrassi: The Next Generation Season 9 DVD
- Showrunner: Brendon Yorke
- No. of episodes: 23

Release
- Original network: CTV (Canada: 1–14); MuchMusic (Canada: 15–23); TeenNick (United States)
- Original release: October 4, 2009 – July 16, 2010

Season chronology
- ← Previous; Season 8 Next → Season 10

The ninth season of Degrassi: The Next Generation premiered in Canada on October 4, 2009, concluded on July 16, 2010, and consists of twenty-three episodes (19 episodes, and 1 movie). Degrassi: The Next Generation is a Canadian serial teen drama television series. Although only one school year passed in the story timeline since season six, season nine is set in the spring semester in which the years it aired. Writers have been able to use a semi-floating timeline, so that the issues depicted are modern for their viewers. This season continues to depict the lives of a group of high school freshmen, juniors and seniors, and graduates as they deal with some of the challenges and issues that young adults face such as drug abuse, sexting, sexually transmitted diseases, sexual identity, homosexuality, crime, sex, and relationships.

Production for the season began on May 19, 2009, at Epitome Pictures' studios in Toronto, Ontario. The final episodes of the season were filmed in part in New York City, New York, and were written and directed by Stefan Brogren, who plays Archie "Snake" Simpson. This was the first season to air on TeenNick in the United States, and to have some Canadian premieres on MuchMusic.

== Cast ==
The ninth season features twenty-four actors who receive star billing, with twenty of them returning from the previous season. Joining the main cast are Annie Clark (Fiona), Landon Liboiron (Declan), Jessica Tyler (Jenna) and Jahmil French (Dave), replacing Sarah Barrable-Tishauer (Liberty), Evan Williams (Kelly), Marc Donato (Derek) and Nina Dobrev (Mia).

=== Main cast ===
- Jamie Johnston as Peter Stone (15 episodes)
- Miriam McDonald as Emma Nelson (5 episodes)
- Cassie Steele as Manuela "Manny" Santos (5 episodes)
- Annie Clark as Fiona Coyne (12 episodes)
- Landon Liboiron as Declan Coyne (18 episodes)
- Jajube Mandiela as Chantay Black (16 episodes)
- Samantha Munro as Anya MacPherson (15 episodes)
- Judy Jiao as Leia Chang (7 episodes)
- Charlotte Arnold as Holly J. Sinclair (20 episodes)
- A.J. Saudin as Connor DeLaurier (12 episodes)
- Sam Earle as K.C. Guthrie (12 episodes)
- Aislinn Paul as Clare Edwards (17 episodes)
- Melinda Shankar as Alli Bhandari (12 episodes)
- Jessica Tyler as Jenna Middleton (17 episodes)
- Jahmil French as Dave Turner (12 episodes)
- Dalmar Abuzeid as Danny Van Zandt (16 episodes)
- Raymond Ablack as Savtaj "Sav" Bhandari (18 episodes)
- Shane Kippel as Gavin "Spinner" Mason (17 episodes)
- Natty Zavitz as Bruce the Moose (5 episodes)
- Scott Paterson as Johnny DiMarco (9 episodes)
- Stefan Brogren as Archie "Snake" Simpson (11 episodes)
- Jordan Hudyma as Blue Chessex (5 episodes)
- Argiris Karras as Riley Stavros (5 episodes)
- Paula Brancati as Jane Vaughn (13 episodes)

==== Degrassi Takes Manhattan ====
The following are credited with the main cast in the special's original two-hour broadcast:

- Mike Lobel as Jay Hogart (5 episodes)

=== Recurring cast ===
Former or future series regulars who appear this season in recurring or guest roles include:

- Melissa DiMarco as Daphne Hatzilakos (6 episodes)
- Nina Dobrev as Mia Jones (2 episodes)
- Amanda Stepto as Christine "Spike" Nelson (2 episodes)
- Adamo Ruggiero as Marco Del Rossi (1 episode)
- Evan Williams as Kelly Ashoona (1 episode)
- Spencer Van Wyck as Wesley Betenkamp (1 episode)
- Shannon Kook-Chun as Zane Park (1 episode)
- Sarah Barrable-Tishauer as Liberty Van Zandt (1 episode)

== Crew ==
Season nine was produced by Epitome Pictures in association with CTV. Funding was provided by The Canadian Film or Video Production Tax Credit and the Ontario Film and Television Tax Credit, the Canadian Television Fund and BCE-CTV Benefits, The Shaw Television Broadcast Fund, the Independent Production Fund, Mountain Cable Program, and RBC Royal Bank.

Linda Schuyler, co-creator of the Degrassi franchise and CEO of Epitome Pictures, served as an executive producer with her husband, and President of Epitome Pictures, Stephen Stohn. Brendon Yorke is also credited as an executive producer again. David Lowe was the producer, and Stephanie Cohen the supervising producer. As well as playing Snake Simpson, Stephen Brogren also served as a producer, and, for the first time, directed episodes, after previously writing, producing, and directing the exclusive online series Degrassi Minis. The casting director was Stephanie Gorin, and the editor was D. Gillian Truster.

The executive story editor was Sarah Glinski, and Matt Heuther the story editor. The script supervisor was Nancy Markle. Episode writers for the season are Duana Taha and Brendon Yorke. The director of photography was Jim Westenbrink, and the director was Phil Earnshaw.

== Reception ==
Linda Schuyler, Stefan Brogren, David Lowe, Stephen Stohn, Stephanie Williams, and Brendon Yorke, along with Epitome Pictures, were nominated for the 25th Gemini Awards for best children's or youth fiction program or series, for producing Degrassi: The Next Generation, but lost to Overruled!. Directors Phil Earnshaw and Stefan Brogren were nominated for "Just Can't Get Enough (Part 2)" and "Beat It (Part 2)" respectively, for best direction in a children's or youth program or series, Brogren would win. On screen couple Landon Liboiron (Declan Coyne) and Charlotte Arnold (Holly J. Sinclair) were nominated for best performance in a children's or youth program or series, for "Waiting for a Girl Like You" and "Somebody" ("Love Games, Parts 1 & 2") respectively, Arnold would win. Linda Schuyler was honoured with the Academy Achievement Award. The following year "Degrassi Takes Manhattan" was nominated for best sound in a dramatic program, but lost to the first episode of The Pillars of the Earth miniseries. At the 2010 Young Artist Awards, Jamie Johnston and Aislinn Paul were nominated as a Leading Young Actor and Supporting Young Actress in the Best Performance in a TV Comedy or Drama Series, Laytrel McMullen and A.J. Saudin were also nominated as a Guest Starring Young Actress and Recurring Young Actor 14 and Over in the Best Performance in a TV Series.

== Episodes ==
The first half of this season included a number of two-part episodes that aired on the same night on CTV, and MuchMusic later in the week. "Just Can't Get Enough" was an hour-long season premiere, and "Beat It" and "Heart Like Mine" were two-part episodes that aired on the same night in Canada, however on consecutive weeks in the US. Episodes 904 & 906 and 903 & 905 also aired together in Canada, to follow the ongoing story lines. The second half of the season premiered on MuchMusic, at one episode a week, then CTV a couple of weeks later in back-to-back format again. The first episode to have its Canadian premiere on MuchMusic was "Why Can't This Be Love? (Part One)". The US had aired the first half of the season by order of production, but opened the second half with the two-part "Why Can't This Be Love?", which was on consecutive weeks in Canada. In the US, four episodes were renamed by TeenNick, in both the TV spots, and the on-screen titles. This list is by order of production, as they appear on the DVD.

| No. overall | No. in season | Title | Canada airdate | U.S. airdate | Prod. code |
|---|---|---|---|---|---|
| 166–167 | 1–2 | "Just Can't Get Enough" | October 4, 2009 | October 9, 2009 | 901 & 902 |
When Mia is offered a major modeling contract in Paris, Peter decides that he'll go with her, but he soon realizes he doesn't fit into her sophisticated world. At a posh party, feeling frustrated and insecure, a guest offers an unlikely escape, which leads Peter on a dark path. Alli becomes jealous when Clare spends more time with new girl Jenna. Holly J. becomes stressed out when everyone wants something from her. Note: This episode marks the final appearance of Nina Dobrev as Mia Jones.
| 168 | 3 | "Shoot to Thrill" | October 18, 2009 | October 16, 2009 | 903 |
Alli starts to feel like her relationship with Johnny is going nowhere. In order to fix it, she decides to spice things up a bit. Meanwhile, Fiona finds the male students at Degrassi rather repulsive. Until she meets Riley, who may just have a future with Fiona—if his past doesn't hurt it that is.
| 169 | 4 | "Close to Me" | October 11, 2009 | October 23, 2009 | 904 |
Jane loves Spinner from the bottom of her heart, but when the gorgeous new boy flirts with her, she finds it hard not to give in. K.C.'s new coach finally lets him play in a game. But when KC makes a mistake, the coach freaks, and KC sees it as a sign that he shouldn't be on the basketball team.
| 170 | 5 | "You Be Illin'" | October 18, 2009 | October 30, 2009 | 905 |
Alli decides she's done with Johnny. However, after talking with him, she then starts falling for him once again. But when he tells her something shocking, all of her hopes disappear. Meanwhile, Peter wants to regain his position in Studz. But they've moved on and recruited Jane.
| 171 | 6 | "Wanna Be Startin' Somethin'" | October 11, 2009 | November 6, 2009 | 906 |
Holly J. and Jane surprise themselves during a class project when they bond and start a babysitting business. But Holly J.'s crush on Declan could ruin things. Dave wants to be on the Anti-Grapevine, but Chantay refuses to put her cousin in the blog until he does something spontaneous.
| 172 | 7 | "Beat It" Part One | November 1, 2009 | November 13, 2009 | 907 |
After an embarrassing incident in lifeguard class, Riley is determined to prove to the world and himself that he's straight. Meanwhile, Anya lies to Sav about her after school activities. Also, Dave gets confident and asks Jenna out, and when they go out, he assumes that Jenna is his girlfriend.
| 173 | 8 | "Beat It" Part Two | November 1, 2009 | November 20, 2009 | 908 |
Riley is accused of gay-bashing after punching Sam and is ostracized by his classmates. Feeling desperate, he decides to search for a de-programmer to make himself straight. Meanwhile, Sav finds out about Anya and Leia LARPing and is upset and bewildered that Anya that would hang out with losers. Also, Jenna has to set Dave straight. Note: This episode marks the final appearance of Jordan Hudyma as Blue Chessex.
| 174 | 9 | "Waiting for a Girl Like You" | November 8, 2009 | February 6, 2010 | 909 |
It's Matchmaker week at Degrassi, and Declan's not interested in a serious relationship. But when he sets his sights on Holly J. as his next romantic victim, he is surprised to find she's immune to his charms. Meanwhile, Leia confides in Chantay about her rocky relationship with Danny, oblivious to the fact that Chantay also has eyes for him. Note: Aired as "Love Games (Part One)" in the United States.
| 175 | 10 | "Somebody" | November 8, 2009 | February 6, 2010 | 910 |
Holly J. begins to fall hard for Declan but realizes that he may not feel the same way. Meanwhile, Dave and Connor's friendship is strained as Dave tries to improve his popularity among the basketball team. Note: Aired as "Love Games (Part Two)" in the United States.
| 176 | 11 | "Heart Like Mine" Part One | November 15, 2009 | April 9, 2010 | 911 |
K.C.'s life is on the fast track, but when he and Clare start to grow apart and his feelings for Jenna grow stronger, he turns to Coach Carson for emotional support. Marco returns to Degrassi as a student teacher and Holly J. uses her friendship with him to her advantage. Note: This episode marks the final appearance of Adamo Ruggiero as Marco Del Rossi
| 177 | 12 | "Heart Like Mine" Part Two | November 15, 2009 | April 16, 2010 | 912 |
K.C. begins to question his relationship with Coach Carson after he demonstrates questionable behavior as a teacher. Meanwhile, Fiona auditions for the school's musical, and Declan gives her a part regardless of the fact that she had a bad performance.
| 178 | 13 | "Holiday Road" | November 22, 2009 | April 23, 2010 | 913 |
Emma returns to Degrassi along with Kelly on their cross-country bike tour and is keeping a big secret from Snake and Spike. Chantay writes an article on the "Anti-Grapevine" about her date with Danny, making everyone believe he's cheap. Note: This episode marks the final appearance of Evan Williams as Kelly Ashoona.
| 179 | 14 | "Start Me Up" | November 22, 2009 | April 30, 2010 | 914 |
Peter opens up a club above The Dot to occupy his time, and when Declan and Fiona's cousin Victoria returns, Peter is put in a dilemma with a decision to make. Meanwhile, Clare is supposed to write a short autobiography on herself but uses a story that Declan told her as her own.
| 180–181 | 15–16 | "Why Can't This Be Love?" "Broken PROMises" | May 10, 2010 | April 2, 2010 | 915 |
When Sav's potential bride-to-be visits just in time for Junior Spring Formal, Anya refuses to be pushed aside. Meanwhile, Johnny tries to win Alli back by asking her to the formal. When she refuses, Bruce tries to set him up with Lindsey, a waitress at a local pool hall. But when Bruce finds that Johnny is avoiding him, he lashes out at him. Note: Aired as "Broken PROMises in the United States. Note: This episode marks the final appearance of Natty Zavitz as Bruce the Moose.
| 182 | 17 | "Innocent When You Dream" | May 24, 2010 | May 7, 2010 | 917 |
Clare becomes obsessed with vampires when she starts having dreams about Declan becoming a vamp. Sav and Anya's relationship becomes even more turbulent.
| 183 | 18 | "In Your Eyes" | May 31, 2010 | May 14, 2010 | 918 |
Riley has been hiding his feelings about his sexuality for a long time and struggles about being open and finally meets a guy. Meanwhile, Clare volunteers to tutor K.C. in math as friends, but things turn sour when Jenna suggests K.C. slack off on studying and consider cheating off of Clare.
| 184 | 19 | "Keep on Loving You" | June 7, 2010 | May 21, 2010 | 919 |
Holly J and Declan are closer than ever. They've made it through the year, Holly J's applied for internships all over the city, and with exams almost done, all they need to worry about is Declan's musical, but when a bombshell from Ms. Coyne who pops up in Toronto regarding the family's plan for the next year, their relationship is put to the test.
| 185–188 | 20–23 | "Degrassi Takes Manhattan" "The Rest of My Life" | July 16, 2010 | July 19, 2010 | 920–923 |
Goodbye high school and hello summer! In the 2-hour season finale, Degrassi grads and friends dive into the summer that will change their lives forever. And what's summer without a little romance – or a unexpected wedding... Special Guest Stars: Jay Manuel, Colin Mochrie, and Mary Murphy. Note: This movie marks the final appearances of Dalmar Abuzeid as Danny Van Zandt, Paula Brancati as Jane Vaughn, Melissa DiMarco as Daphne Hatzilakos, Mike Lobel as Jay Hogart, Cassie Steele as Manny Santos, and Amanda Stepto as Christine "Spike" Nelson.

== DVD release ==
The release of season nine was made available online and on DVD in select stores by Echo Bridge Home Entertainment in the US on July 20, 2010; this is the third season not to be released by Alliance Atlantis Home Entertainment in Canada or by FUNimation Entertainment in the US. As well as every episode from the season, the release features the Degrassi Takes Manhattan movie, and bonus material including deleted scenes, bloopers and behind-the-scenes featurettes.

The Complete Ninth Season
| Set details | Special features |
| 19 director's cut episodes/1 movie; 4-disc set; 1.78:1 aspect ratio; Languages: English (Dolby Digital 5.1) | Degrassi Takes Manhattan: The Movie (episodes 920–923); Bloopers; Deleted scenes; Webisodes/Minis; Music videos |
| Release dates | Degrassi Takes Manhattan: The Movie (episodes 920–923); Bloopers; Deleted scenes; Webisodes/Minis; Music videos |
| (Canada) (United States) Region 1 | Degrassi Takes Manhattan: The Movie (episodes 920–923); Bloopers; Deleted scenes; Webisodes/Minis; Music videos |
| July 20, 2010 | Degrassi Takes Manhattan: The Movie (episodes 920–923); Bloopers; Deleted scenes; Webisodes/Minis; Music videos |
