= List of Degrassi characters =

List of Degrassi characters include:

- List of Degrassi characters (1987–1992), the second and third entries of the Degrassi television franchise
- List of Degrassi: The Next Generation characters, the fourth entry of the Degrassi franchise
- List of Degrassi: Next Class characters, the fifth entry of the Degrassi franchise

== See also ==
- The Kids of Degrassi Street
