= Degrassi season 1 =

Degrassi season 1 may refer to:

- Degrassi Junior High season 1, airing January 18 – May 3, 1987
- Degrassi High season 1, airing November 6, 1989 – February 13, 1990
- Degrassi: The Next Generation season 1, airing October 14, 2001 – March 3, 2002
- Degrassi: Next Class season 1, airing January 2016
