= Degrassi season 14 =

Degrassi
- Season 14
- Showrunner: Sarah Glinski
- No. of episodes: 28

Release
- Original network: MTV Canada (Canada); TeenNick (United States)
- Original release: October 28, 2014 – August 2, 2015

Season chronology
- ← Previous; Season 13

The fourteenth and final season of the Canadian teen drama television series Degrassi, formerly known as Degrassi: The Next Generation, premiered on October 28, 2014. Although four school years have passed in the story timeline since season six, season fourteen is set during the second term of the spring semester in the years it aired. Writers have been able to use a semi-floating timeline, so that the issues depicted are modern for their viewers. This season again depicts the lives of a group of high school freshmen, sophomores, seniors and Graduates as they deal with some of the challenges and issues that teenagers face such as teenage pregnancy, dysfunctional families, sexism, arson, sexting, sexual identity, miscarriages, anxiety disorders, drug use, child abuse, abstinence, and gang violence.

The fourteenth season was announced on November 13, 2013. Filming for the season commenced on April 11, 2014, at Epitome Studios in Toronto. Filming continued into August, with a break before filming the final four episodes of the season in order to give Epitome the opportunity to start filming episodes for the first season of their new series. Filming for this season completed on October 6, 2014. On June 4, 2015, it was announced that it would be the show's final season.

== Cast ==
The fourteenth season has twenty-four actors receiving star billing with twenty-two of them returning from the previous season. Joining the main cast are Amanda Arcuri (Lola) and Reiya Downs (Shay), replacing Jahmil French (Dave), Alicia Josipovic (Bianca), Cory Lee (Ms. Oh), Chloe Rose (Katie) and Jordan Todosey (Adam).

=== Main cast ===
- Amanda Arcuri as Lola Pacini (20 episodes)
- Craig Arnold as Luke Baker (1 episode)
- Luke Bilyk as Drew Torres (20 episodes)
- Stefan Brogren as Archie "Snake" Simpson (7 episodes)
- Munro Chambers as Eli Goldsworthy (15 episodes)
- Reiya Downs as Shaylynn "Shay" Powers (18 episodes)
- Sarah Fisher as Becky Baker (15 episodes)
- Ana Golja as Zoë Rivas (21 episodes)
- Nikki Gould as Grace Cardinal (21 episodes)
- Ricardo Hoyos as Zigmund "Zig" Novak (23 episodes)
- Demetrius Joyette as Mike "Dallas" Dallas (12 episodes)
- André Kim as Winston "Chewy" Chu (24 episodes)
- Lyle Lettau as Tristan Milligan (17 episodes)
- Spencer MacPherson as Hunter Hollingsworth (18 episodes)
- Eric Osborne as Miles Hollingsworth III (20 episodes)
- Aislinn Paul as Clare Edwards (19 episodes)
- Cristine Prosperi as Imogen Moreno (19 episodes)
- A.J. Saudin as Connor DeLaurier (6 episodes)
- Olivia Scriven as Maya Matlin (24 episodes)
- Melinda Shankar as Alli Bhandari (16 episodes)
- Jessica Tyler as Jenna Middleton (7 episodes)
- Sara Waisglass as Francesca "Frankie" Hollingsworth (25 episodes)
- Richard Walters as Deon "Tiny" Bell (15 episodes)
- Niamh Wilson as Jack Jones (13 episodes)

Ehren Kassam appears in a recurring role as Jonah Haak in 7 episodes. Although Kassam is not credited with the main cast in the credits, Bell Media and Epitome still considered him a series regular.

== Crew ==
Season fourteen is produced by Epitome Pictures in association with Bell Media and DHX Media. Funding was provided by The Canadian Media Fund, The Shaw Rocket Fund, RBC Royal Bank, The Canadian Film or Video Production Tax Credit, and the Ontario Film and Television Tax Credit.

Linda Schuyler, co-creator of the Degrassi franchise and CEO of Epitome Pictures, serves as an executive producer with her husband, and President of Epitome Pictures, Stephen Stohn. Matt Huether is also credited as a co-executive producer, Karen Hill as consulting producer, Sarah Glinsli an executive producer, and Ella Schwarzman an executive post producer. Stefan Brogren is series producer, while David Lowe is credited as producer, and Stephanie Williams the supervising producer. The casting directors are Larissa Mair and Krisha Bullock Alexander, and the editors include Jason B. Irvine and Gordon Thorne.

The executive story editor is Matt Schiller, the story editors are Ian Malone and Sadiya Durrani, and Courtney Jane Walker is the senior story editor. Episode writers for the season include Ramona Barckert, Courtney Jane Walker, Karen Hill, Michael Grassi, Scott Oleszkowicz, Mike McPhaden, Matt Huether, and Matt Schiller. The director of photography is Mitchell T. Ness, and the directors include Stefan Brogren, Rt!, and Bruce McDonald.

== Episodes ==
No. overall	No. in season	Title	Canada airdate	U.S. airdate	Prod. code
358	1	"Smells Like Teen Spirit"	October 28, 2014	October 28, 2014	1401
Spring break is over, and school is back in session, Clare makes a difficult decision and struggles with telling Drew. Trying to turn a fresh page, Zoe tries to join Power Cheer whose head captain is Becky. Mr. Hollingsworth worries that Miles' secret relationship with Tristan will ruin his political prospects.
359	2	"Wise Up"	November 4, 2014	November 4, 2014	1402
Mr. Hollingsworth crafts a plan to protect his image. Zoë is tired of being judged for her sexual assault, especially by Zig and takes matters into her own hands. After talking about their situation, Claire offers Drew an out.
360	3	"If You Could Only See"	November 11, 2014	November 11, 2014	1403
Tired of having different rules from her brother's in her house, Zoe and Frankie create a new fundraising idea. Becky realizes that she isn't the same girl that she used to be, after going on a terrible date. Maya becomes worried about Miles after he begins skipping class.
361	4	"Can't Stop This Thing We Started"	November 18, 2014	November 18, 2014	1404
When Eli returns to Toronto, Clare has to muster up the courage to tell him about her new situation. Winston grows jealous of Tristan's relationship with his best friend, Miles. A normally confident Zig feels emasculated when Grace beats him at arm wrestling and sets out to prove that he is a man.
362	5	"There's Your Trouble"	November 25, 2014	November 25, 2014	1405
Becky is reluctant to visit Luke in juvenile detention and decides to audition for a school band. Zoë pushes the squad too hard and faces an uphill battle when they want to stop oomchatting nudes for money. Eli and Clare face an obstacle in their relationship due to her pregnancy with Drew. Note: This marks the final appearance of Craig Arnold as Luke Baker.
363	6	"(You Drive Me) Crazy"	December 2, 2014	December 2, 2014	1406
Maya has a recurring nightmare about Miles and thinks that he needs help, but find out it might be her who needs the help. Imogen finds out that Jack doesn't want to be monogamous, which she pretends to be okay with. Frankie finds disturbing comics about the cheerleaders on Hunter's computer.
364	7	"I'll Be Missing You"	December 9, 2014	December 9, 2014	1407
Zoë's sweet 16 takes a horrifying turn when an anonymous person threatens to reveal the truth about Degrassi Nudes unless she quits the team. Tristan notices a change in Miles' behavior and contemplates talking to him about it. Dallas fears that Alli's future plans do not include him.
365	8	"Hush"	December 16, 2014	December 16, 2014	1408
Tristan, Winston, Frankie and Hunter stage an intervention for Miles to talk about his "weed addiction." The Power Cheer team attempts to figure out who is blackmailing them as they prepare for semi-finals. Becky has become fast friends with Jonah but Drew seems to think that he has a thing for her.
366	9	"Something's Got to Give"	December 23, 2014	December 23, 2014	1409
Imogen is on a mission to find out who is behind Degrassi Nudes and is shocked to realize that Jack is involved. Maya lies to the police about the accident to protect Miles from his father's wrath. Drew is committed to keeping Becky happy but his situation with Clare has his attention divided.
367	10	"Hero vs. Villain"	December 30, 2014	December 30, 2014	1410
When Mr. Simpson calls an assembly to find out who is behind Degrassi Nudes, Zoë goes to extreme lengths to end the threatening messages once and for all. Clare has to figure out a way to tell Drew that Eli is actually the father of the baby. Tristan attempts to work things out with Miles.
368	11	"Firestarter" Part One	January 6, 2015	January 6, 2015	1411
In the first part of the explosive winter Finale, As word about the fundraising scandal spreads, Frankie convinces the cheerleaders to help her pin Degrassi Nudes entirely on Zoë. Zig and Tiny compete to get a cheerleader's phone number. Clare contemplates her future as her pregnancy becomes public information.
369	12	"Firestarter" Part Two	January 13, 2015	January 13, 2015	1412
In the second part of the explosive winter finale, The Hollingworth family is on edge after Frankie's nudes is leaked, Miles tries his best to expose his dad for the man he truly is. Eli tries to make things right with Clare after finding out that he is the father of her baby. Frankie and Winston's plan on getting Zoe to confess puts all their lives in danger.
Part 2
370	13	"Watch Out Now"	July 20, 2015	July 20, 2015	1413
A month after the fire, the students find Degrassi under a new strict regime. Zoe begins to feel the heat from all fronts as she might go to prison as she gets charged with Child pornography charges and also has to deal with being an outcast after landing the entire power cheer in detention. Winston decides to do standup comedy to help uplift the school's spirit, but his jokes aren't a great hit to everyone.
371	14	"Ready or Not"	July 20, 2015	July 20, 2015	1414
Winston's musical is set to be performed at Degrassi, and casts Lola as a way to keep her silence. Zig uses the musical as a to keep busy from Tiny's stabbing. Clare and Eli find difficulty in only being co-parents when personal feelings gets in the way.
372	15	"Wishlist"	July 21, 2015	July 21, 2015	1415
Frankie and Hunter's 15th birthday is coming up, and is forced to contact her estranged father to get some financial support for the party of her dreams. Maya realizes how close she really is to her friends. A face off against Damon, brings to light a skeleton Jack has been keeping "in the closet".
373	16	"Walking in My Shoes"	July 22, 2015	July 22, 2015	1416
Still on probation, Zoë is forced to work in the cafeteria where she has to face her angry classmates for making their school into a prison. As Frankie struggles in math, she uses Lola as a way to pass, only to get hurt in the end. Imogen adheres to Jack's wishes about coming out to her parents, but with weeks left until her graduation, she soon realizes how much she is giving up.
374	17	"Get It Together"	July 23, 2015	July 23, 2015	1417
Becky tries to balance sinning against God as she gets more sexually attracted to Jonah. Maya finds herself partnered with an old friend for gym class. Clare and Eli take care of Dallas' son as practice for when their baby arrives.
375	18	"Give Me One Reason"	July 24, 2015	July 24, 2015	1418
Maya and Zig contemplate a relationship as her mom finds out. Still reeling from her miscarriage, Clare and Eli take a spontaneous road trip to New York to get into Columbia a semester early. Hunter has a crush on Arlene but has a hard time expressing his feelings.
376	19	"I Wanna Be Adored"	July 27, 2015	July 27, 2015	1419
Not knowing the reason, Ali feels that Claire is pulling away from her as she continues to miss Prom Committee meetings. Zig moves in with Tiny and his brother, Vince and soon falls back into old habits. Tristan makes creative changes to his online dating profile.
377	20	"Teen Age Riot"	July 28, 2015	July 28, 2015	1420
Zig's date night with Maya ends with them making a mistake while under the influence of MDMA. When Principal Pill confronts Clare about her desire to not be considered valedictorian, Clare is furious to learn Principal Pill has been listening to student conversations on campus. The air between Frankie and Winston is tense which makes her think of quitting the musical.
378	21	"The Kids Aren't Alright" Part One	July 29, 2015	July 29, 2015	1421
Zig learns the truth about what happened to Damon. Frankie has feelings for Winston again, but keeps it a secret. While volunteering at a hospital, Becky is forced to work with Drew, who questions whether or not Jonah can be trusted.
379	22	"The Kids Aren't Alright" Part Two	July 30, 2015	July 30, 2015	1422
Zig finds out that Damon's crew is striking back the night of the musical. Winston realizes how important Frankie is to him. Becky has to choose whether or not to forgive Jonah for stealing from her.
380	23	"Finally (1)" Part One	July 31, 2015	July 31, 2015	1423
It's prom time at Degrassi and in a last-minute shot to save his night, Drew plans an elaborate prom-posal to a now single Becky. Miles attempts to salvage the little relationship he has with his brother, Hunter by helping him with his crush on Arlene. With everyone going off in their separate ways after graduation, Clare begins to worry about her future and relationship with Eli.
381	24	"Finally (2)" Part Two	July 31, 2015	July 31, 2015	1424
Drew helps Dallas save prom night, but is punished and unable to participate in the graduation ceremony. Clare is still unsure of her future plans, including where she stands with Eli. Imogen makes a decision about her relationship with Jack. Note: This marks the final appearances of Aislinn Paul as Clare Edwards, Munro Chambers as Eli Goldsworthy, Melinda Shankar as Ali Bhandari, A.J. Saudin as Connor DeLaurier, Demetrius Joyette as Mike "Dallas" Dallas, Niamh Wilson as Jack Jones, Jessica Tyler as Jenna Middleton, Sarah Fisher as Becky Baker, Cristine Prosperi as Imogen Moreno, and Luke Bilyk as Drew Torres. Note: This is the final regular episode of the third incarnation of the Degrassi: The Next Generation series.
382–385	25–28	"Degrassi: Don't Look Back" "Summer Girls"	August 2, 2015	August 2, 2015	1425–1428
A summer that was intended to be filled with late-night bonfires, new romances, and possibly a new chapter in life is overshadowed when a seductive and infuriating girl, Gloria, goes missing. This cloud hangs over everyone's summer because they are either affected or implicated in some way by her disappearance. While searching for her, everyone discovers cracks and difficulties in their lives that must be repaired before the summer ends. Note: This is a two-hour movie special, and airs as "Summer Girls" in half-hour syndication. Note: This also served as a backdoor pilot to Degrassi: Next Class, the fourth incarnation of the Degrassi franchise.
