= Directors Guild of Canada Award for Best Direction - Family =

Award

The Directors Guild of Canada Award for Best Direction in a Family Series is a television award that honors direction in programs aimed towards children and family produced in Canada. The award has undergone various name changes since its inception in 2002.

== Winners and nominees ==
Winners in bold.

=== 2002 ===
Outstanding Achievement in a Television Movie/ Mini-Series – Children’s

- **Shawn Levy** – Jett Jackson: The Movie (Disney Channel)
  - Laurie Lynd – I Was a Rat (BBC)
  - Martin Wood – The Impossible Elephant (Global)
  - Philip Spink – Voyage of the Unicorn (Odyssey)

Outstanding Achievement in a Television Series – Children’s

- **Bruce McDonald** – Degrassi: The Next Generation ("Mother and Child Reunion") (CTV)
  - Patrick Williams – The Famous Jett Jackson ("Holly") (Disney Channel)
  - Alan Goluboff – Screech Owls ("Instant Replay") (YTV)
  - Craig Pryce – The Zack Files ("Photo Double") (YTV)

=== 2003 ===
Outstanding Achievement in a Television Series – Children’s

- **Bruce McDonald** – Degrassi: The Next Generation ("When Doves Cry") (CTV)
  - Don McCutcheon – Ace Lightning ("Face The Music") (BBC)
  - Grant Harvey – Mentors ("Remembrance Day") (Family Channel)
  - Patrick Williams – Strange Days at Blake Holsey High ("Wormhole") (Global)

=== 2004 ===
Outstanding Team Achievement In A Family Feature Film

- **Blizzard**
  - The Blue Butterfly
  - Goose on the Loose

Outstanding Team Achievement In A Television Series – Family

- **Degrassi: The Next Generation** ("Holiday") (CTV)
  - The Blobheads ("Reality Bites") (CBC)
  - Radio Free Roscoe ("Count On Me") (Family)
  - Strange Days at Blake Holsey High ("Shrink") (Global)

=== 2005 ===
Outstanding Team Achievement In A Family Feature Film

- **Saint Ralph**
  - Bailey's Billion$
  - Some Things That Stay

Outstanding Team Achievement In A Family Television Movie/Mini-Series

- **A Bear Named Winnie** (CBC)
  - A Beachcomber's Christmas (CBC)
  - Eve's Christmas (Hallmark Channel)
  - Plain Truth (Lifetime)

Outstanding Team Achievement In A Television Series – Family

- **Degrassi: The Next Generation** ("Time Stands Still" Part 2) (CTV)
  - Dark Oracle ("Dark Oracle") (YTV)
  - Instant Star ("Kiss Me Deadly") (CTV)
  - Radio Free Roscoe ("Truth Or Consequence") (Family)

=== 2006 ===
Outstanding Team Achievement In A Family Television Movie/Mini-Series

- **Spirit Bear: The Simon Jackson Story** (CTV)
  - Booky Makes Her Mark (CBC)
  - Christmas in Boston (ABC Family)
  - Crazy for Christmas (Movie Central)

Outstanding Team Achievement In A Television Series – Family

- **renegadepress.com** ("The Rez") (APTN)
  - Instant Star ("All Apologies") (CTV)
  - Life With Derek ("Babe Raider") (Family)
  - Naturally, Sadie ("Double Jeopardy") (Family)

=== 2007 ===
Outstanding Team Achievement In A Family Television Movie/Mini-Series

- **Me and Luke** aka A Dad for Christmas (Movie Central)
  - Family in Hiding (Lifetime)

Outstanding Team Achievement In A Television Series – Family

- **Instant Star** ("Date With The Night") (CTV)
  - Degrassi: The Next Generation ("Can't Hardly Wait") (CTV)
  - Life With Derek ("Fright Night") (Family)
  - renegadepress.com ("Blackout" aka Getting it Right) (APTN)

=== 2008 ===
Outstanding Team Achievement In A Feature Film – Family

- **Breakfast with Scot**
  - How She Move

Outstanding Team Achievement In A Family Television Movie/Mini-Series

- **Booky & the Secret Santa** (CBC)
  - The Good Witch (Hallmark)
  - Charlie & Me (Hallmark)
  - Roxy Hunter and the Mystery of the Moody Ghost (Nickelodeon)

Outstanding Team Achievement In A Television Series – Family

- **Degrassi: The Next Generation** ("Pass the Dutchie") (CTV)
  - Heartland ("Come What May") (CBC)
  - Instant Star ("Your Time is Gonna Come") (CTV)
  - Instant Star ("Us and Them") (CTV)

=== 2009 ===
Outstanding Team Achievement In A Family Television Movie/Mini-Series

- **Anne of Green Gables: A New Beginning** (CTV)
  - An Old Fashioned Thanksgiving (Hallmark)
  - Booky's Crush (CBC)
  - Every Second Counts (Hallmark)

Outstanding Team Achievement In A Television Series – Family

- **Heartland** ("Dancing in the Dark") (CBC)
  - Degrassi: The Next Generation ("Fight the Power") (CTV)
  - Life With Derek ("How I Met Your Stepbrother") (Family)
  - Soul ("My Way") (VisionTV)

=== 2010 ===
Outstanding Team Achievement In A Television Series – Family

- **Heartland** ("The Haunting of Hanley Barn") (CBC)
  - Degrassi: The Next Generation ("Innocent When You Dream") (CTV)
  - How to Be Indie ("How To Party Like Chandra") (YTV)
  - Overruled! ("Two Boys and a Baby") (Family)

=== 2011 ===
Outstanding Team Achievement In A Television Series – Family

- **Heartland** ("Jackpot!") (CBC)
  - Degrassi ("My Body Is a Cage" Part 2) (MuchMusic)
  - Tower Prep ("Dreams") (Cartoon Network)
  - Wingin' It ("Bully Elliot") (Family)

=== 2012 ===
Best Television Series – Family

- **Heartland** ("What's in a Name?") (CBC)
  - Degrassi ("Dead and Gone" Part 2) (MuchMusic)
  - How to Be Indie ("How to Get Plugged In") (YTV)
  - R.L. Stine's The Haunting Hour ("Brush with Madness") (The Hub)

=== 2013 ===
Best Television Series – Family

- **Heartland** ("Running Against the Wind") (CBC)
  - Degrassi ("Scream" Part 2) (MuchMusic)
  - Degrassi ("Bitter Sweet Symphony" Part 2) (MuchMusic)
  - Heartland ("The Road Ahead") (CBC)

=== 2014 ===
Best Television Series – Family

- **Heartland** ("Darkness and Light") (CBC)
  - Degrassi ("Better Man") (MuchMusic)
  - Degrassi ("Hypnotize") (MuchMusic)
  - Heartland ("The Penny Drops") (CBC)

=== 2015 ===
Best Television Series – Family

- **Open Heart** ("Last Things First") (YTV)
  - Degrassi ("There's Your Trouble") (MuchMusic)
  - Degrassi ("Firestarter" Part 1) (MuchMusic)
  - Degrassi ("Give Me One Reason") (MuchMusic)

=== 2016 ===
Best Television Series – Family

- **Heartland** ("Before the Darkness") (CBC)
  - Degrassi: Next Class ("#BootyCall") (Family)
  - Degrassi: Next Class ("#SorryNotSorry") (Family)
  - Degrassi: Next Class ("#ThisCouldBeUsButYouPlayin") (Family)

== See also ==
- Canadian television awards
