= Shane Kippel =

Canadian actor

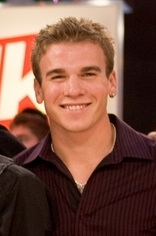
- Kippel in September 2008
- Born: Shane Warren Kippel; June 4, 1986 (age 40); Toronto, Ontario, Canada
- Occupations: Actor, Musician
- Years active: 2001–present

Shane Warren Kippel (born June 4, 1986) is a Canadian actor. He is best known for his role as Gavin "Spinner" Mason on Degrassi: The Next Generation.

== Career ==
Kippel made his television debut playing Gavin "Spinner" Mason on Degrassi: The Next Generation from seasons 1-9 and reprised his role in the television film Degrassi Takes Manhattan. Kippel reprised his role in an episode of season 14, and again reprised his role for two episodes of Degrassi: Next Class, along with several of his previous cast mates.

Kippel played Chad the Jock in the 2003 film Todd and the Book of Pure Evil, which was tagged as "A teenager's guide to heavy metal, cheerleaders, true love, and Satan". He also had a recurring role on Life with Derek as the I-Wanna-Rock drummer Ralph in the band "D-Rock" from 2006 to 2009.

In 2010, he made an appearance on Pure Pwnage and played Davis in the film Dog Pound.

In 2018, Kippel was in Drake's music video for "I'm Upset", which took place during a Degrassi High School reunion, reprising his role as Spinner.

Kippel played drums on the rock band Open Your Eyes' debut album Truth or Consequence. Kippel currently is a drummer for the alternative/rock group Dear Love.

== Personal life ==
Kippel is Jewish and has three brothers.

== Filmography ==
=== Film ===
Year	Title	Role	Notes
2003	Todd and the Book of Pure Evil	Chad the Jock	Short film
2010	Dog Pound	Davis	
2010	Verona	George	Short film
2020	Inside the Actors Cult	Jeff	Short film
2020	Survivial Smarts	Soldier	Voice; Short film
2020	The Beacons of Gondor	Son	Short film;

=== Television ===
Year	Title	Role	Notes
2001–2014	Degrassi: The Next Generation	Gavin "Spinner" Mason	Main character (seasons 1–9) Guest (season 14); 189 episodes
2005–2009	Degrassi: Minis	Gavin "Spinner" Mason	25 episodes
2006–2009	Life with Derek	Ralph	16 episodes
2007	Degrassi: Doing What Matters	Self	TV special
2008	Degrassi Spring Break Movie	Gavin "Spinner" Mason	TV movie
2010	Degrassi Takes Manhattan	Gavin "Spinner" Mason	TV movie
2010	Pure Pwnage	Ryan	Episode: "Pwnageddon"
2011	Combat Hospital	LCPL Chuck Braddock	Episode: "Welcome to Kandahar"
2016	Degrassi: Next Class	Gavin "Spinner" Mason	2 episodes
2023	Slasher	Beggar	Episode: "Vengeance"

=== Music video ===
Year	Title	Artist
2018	I'm Upset	Drake

== Filmmaking credits ==
Year	Title	Producer	Writer	Notes
2020	The Beacons of Gondor	Yes	No	
2020	Survival Smarts	Yes	Yes	
2020	Inside the Actors Cult	Yes	No	

== Awards and nominations ==
Year	Award	Category	Nominated work	Result	Notes	Ref.
2002	Young Artist Awards	Best Ensemble in a TV Series (Comedy or Drama)	Degrassi: The Next Generation	Won	Shared with cast	
2003	Young Artist Awards	Best Ensemble in a TV Series (Comedy or Drama)	Degrassi: The Next Generation	Nominated	Shared with cast	
2006	Young Artist Awards	Best Ensemble in a TV Series (Comedy or Drama)	Degrassi: The Next Generation	Nominated	Shared with cast	
2008	Gemini Awards	Best Performance in a Children's or Youth Program Series	Degrassi: The Next Generation (Episode: Death of Glory Pt. 2)	Nominated		
2020	Canada Shorts Film Festival	Best Comedy	Inside the Actors Cult	Won	Shared with: Scott Paterson, Raymond Ablack, Dalmar Abuzeid, and Samantha Ghost	
2020	Seoul Web Fest	Best Comedy	Inside the Actors Cult	Nominated	Shared with: Scott Paterson, Raymond Ablack, Dalmar Abuzeid, and Samantha Ghost	
2020	Seoul Web Fest	Best Action	The Beacons of Gondor	Won	Shared with: Scott Paterson, Raymond Ablack, Dalmar Abuzeid, and Samantha Ghost	
2020	Seoul Web Fest	Best Short	The Beacons of Gondor	Nominated	Shared with: Scott Paterson, Raymond Ablack, Dalmar Abuzeid, and Samantha Ghost	
2020	Indie Short Fest	Outstanding Achievement Award	The Beacons of Gondor	Won	Shared with: Scott Paterson, Raymond Ablack, Dalmar Abuzeid, and Samantha Ghost	
