= Degrassi season 13 =

Degrassi
- Season 13
- Title card
- Showrunner: Sarah Glinski
- No. of episodes: 40

Release
- Original network: MuchMusic (Canada; 1-8); MTV Canada (Canada; 9-40); TeenNick (United States)
- Original release: July 11, 2013 – July 29, 2014

Season chronology
- ← Previous; Season 12 Next → Season 14

The thirteenth season of the Canadian teen drama television series Degrassi, formerly known as Degrassi: The Next Generation, premiered on July 11, 2013, concluded on July 29, 2014, in Canada and the United States, and consists of 40 episodes. Although only four school years have passed in the story timeline since season six, this season was split into 4 parts. The first part is set in the summer. The second part is set in the fall/winter semester. The third and fourth part is set during the first term of the spring semester. Writers have been able to use a semi-floating timeline, so that the issues depicted are modern for their viewers. This season depicts the lives of a group of high school freshmen, sophomores, seniors and graduates as they deal with some of the challenges and issues that teenagers face such as cancer, texting while driving, death, sexism, sleep disorders, cyber bullying, domestic violence, rape, racial profiling and relationships.

The thirteenth season was announced November 30, 2012, and production for the season began in April 2013 at Epitome Pictures' studios in Toronto, Ontario. This season departs from the telenovela/soap opera format used in the previous three seasons. This also marks the first time in Degrassi history that a season aired for a full year as the season began airing in early July 2013 and ended in late July 2014 and was split into 4 parts.

Initially broadcast in Canada on MuchMusic, the show moved to sibling channel MTV Canada on October 3, 2013.

== Cast ==
The thirteenth season has 26 actors receiving star billing with 20 of them returning from the previous season. Starting this season, cast members are only credited for the episodes they appear in. Joining the main cast this season are Ana Golja (Zoe), Nikki Gould (Grace), André Kim (Winston), Eric Osborne (Miles), Sara Waisglass (Frankie) and Niamh Wilson (Jack), replacing Shanice Banton (Marisol), Annie Clark (Fiona), Daniel Kelly (Owen), Justin Kelly (Jake), Jacob Neayem (Mo) and Alexa Steele (Tori).

=== Main cast ===
- Craig Arnold as Luke Baker (8 episodes)
- Luke Bilyk as Drew Torres (38 episodes)
- Stefan Brogren as Archie "Snake" Simpson (12 episodes)
- Munro Chambers as Eli Goldsworthy (13 episodes)
- Sarah Fisher as Becky Baker (25 episodes)
- Jahmil French as Dave Turner (1 episode)
- Ana Golja as Zoë Rivas (34 episodes)
- Nikki Gould as Grace Cardinal (15 episodes)
- Ricardo Hoyos as Zigmund "Zig" Novak (18 episodes)
- Alicia Josipovic as Bianca DeSousa (4 episodes)
- Demetrius Joyette as Mike "Dallas" Dallas (32 episodes)
- André Kim as Winston "Chewy" Chu (27 episodes)
- Cory Lee as Miss Oh (3 episodes)
- Lyle Lettau as Tristan Milligan (33 episodes)
- Eric Osborne as Miles Hollingsworth III (34 episodes)
- Aislinn Paul as Clare Edwards (36 episodes)
- Cristine Prosperi as Imogen Moreno (30 episodes)
- Chloe Rose as Katie Matlin (2 episodes)
- A.J. Saudin as Connor DeLaurier (24 episodes)
- Olivia Scriven as Maya Matlin (38 episodes)
- Melinda Shankar as Alli Bhandari (33 episodes)
- Jordan Todosey as Adam Torres (8 episodes)
- Jessica Tyler as Jenna Middleton (25 episodes)
- Sara Waisglass as Francesca "Frankie" Hollingsworth (19 episodes)
- Niamh Wilson as Jacqueline "Jack" Jones (10 episodes)

== Crew ==
Season thirteen is produced by Epitome Pictures in association with Bell Media. Funding was provided by The Canadian Media Fund, The Shaw Rocket Fund, RBC Royal Bank, The Canadian Film or Video Production Tax Credit, and the Ontario Film and Television Tax Credit.

Linda Schuyler, co-creator of the Degrassi franchise and CEO of Epitome Pictures, serves as an executive producer with her husband, and President of Epitome Pictures, Stephen Stohn. Matt Huether is also credited as a co-executive producer, Karen Hill as consulting producer, Sarah Glinski an executive producer, and Ella Schwarzman an executive post producer. Stefan Brogren is series producer, while David Lowe is credited as producer, and Stephanie Williams the supervising producer. The casting directors are Larissa Mair and Krisha Bullock Alexander, and the editors include Jason B. Irvine and Gordon Thorne.

The executive story editor is Matt Schiller, the story editors are Ian Malone and Sadiya Durrani, and Courtney Jane Walker is the senior story editor. Episode writers for the season include Ramona Barckert, Karen Hill, Michael Grassi, and Matt Schiller. The director of photography is Mitchell T. Ness, and the directors include Stefan Brogren and Bruce McDonald.

== Episodes ==
The summer block began with a one-hour special, and aired weekly with an after show, After Degrassi. The fall block ran from October 3 to November 21, 2013, on MTV in Canada, and on TeenNick in the United States. The winter block began on January 28, continued through spring, and ended on April 22, 2014, on MTV in Canada, and TeenNick in the United States. Unlike previous seasons, the thirteenth season continued through until summer and has a second summer block, which began on June 3, 2014, on MTV in Canada, and TeenNick in the United States, making this season the first to have new episodes from the same season airing a year after the first episode premiered.

| No. overall | No. in season | Title | Canada airdate | U.S. airdate | Prod. code |
|---|---|---|---|---|---|
| 318–319 | 1–2 | "Summertime" | July 11, 2013 | July 11, 2013 | 1301 & 1302 |
Summer has begun! Maya is excited to be spending the summer with Tristan on the school field trip to Paris, France. Two new students make their way to Degrassi: A former TV star, Zoë Rivas, makes her way to Degrassi and a cute guy named Miles, who encourages her to let her wild side out. Meanwhile, Clare finds out that she has cancer and has to undergo chemotherapy while trying to make her long distance relationship with Eli work. With his girlfriend going home to Florida for the summer, Adam gets a job at a kids' camp at Degrassi and becomes fast friends with a now single Imogen, which makes Becky jealous. Guest star: Fefe Dobson as herself. Note: These episodes mark the final appearance of Chloe Rose as Katie Matlin until she returned in Degrassi next Class season 3 and 4
| 320 | 3 | "All I Wanna Do" | July 18, 2013 | July 18, 2013 | 1303 |
Despite her serious diagnosis, Clare is determined to remain a regular girl, but worries that she will lose Eli, who begins acting different. Feeling lonely with Clare still being stuck in Toronto, Alli decides to explore Paris by herself, and meets her possible soulmate along the way. Tristan thinks his roommates Miles and Winston are homophobic and convinces Maya to pretend to be his girlfriend.
| 321 | 4 | "My Own Worst Enemy" | July 25, 2013 | July 25, 2013 | 1304 |
Clare decides to live life to the fullest after hearing her diagnosis might be terminal. In Paris, Alli potentially ruins any chance of going out with Leo, when she uses him to complete her presentation for class. Also, Tristan's attraction to Miles grows steadily, but makes a mistake he would regret.
| 322 | 5 | "About a Girl" | August 1, 2013 | August 1, 2013 | 1305 |
Adam finds out Becky has been hanging out with another boy in Florida and, in an attempt to save his relationship, violates Becky's trust. In Paris, Maya decides to take things into her own hands when Tristan becomes tired of watching Miles and Zoë make out. Meanwhile, Alli thinks things are moving too fast with Leo and invites Jenna and Connor to dinner with them.
| 323 | 6 | "Cannonball" | August 8, 2013 | August 8, 2013 | 1306 |
Still hung up over Becky, Adam takes Dallas' advice and decides to move on with his life by hooking up with Imogen. However, he realizes he doesn't want to move on from Becky and impulsively tries to win her back. In Paris, after kissing Miles, Tristian goes AWOL and it's up to Miles and Maya to find him. Alli attempts to help Jenna get over Connor by setting her up on a blind date with Leo's friend.
| 324 | 7 | "Honey" | August 15, 2013 | August 15, 2013 | 1307 |
With Alli's beautiful trip to France coming to an end, reality sets in as she tries to figure out a way to salvage her "perfect" relationship with Leo. With Adam laid up in the hospital, Drew returns to the kids camp to distract himself. As the class prepares to go to a French restaurant, Maya decides to show-up Zoë by purchasing a beautiful yet expensive dress. Note: This marks the final appearance of Jordan Todosey as Adam Torres.
| 325 | 8 | "Young Forever" | August 22, 2013 | August 22, 2013 | 1308 |
As the summer comes to a close, the incoming senior class unite in celebration of Adam. In the midst of tragedy, Clare receives some good news. Note: Final episode to air on MuchMusic in Canada. It was advertised as the summer finale before switching over to MTV Canada for the rest of the run. Note: This marks the final appearance of Jahmil French as Dave Turner.
Part 2
| 326 | 9 | "This Is How We Do It" | October 3, 2013 | October 3, 2013 | 1309 |
Three weeks after Adam's death, the students try to move on with the start of the new school year, but for Drew, it's not easy. Meanwhile, Zoe finds it hard to fit in as a normal girl. Ali finds herself dealing with a secret of her own, unaware of the danger that lays ahead of her. Note: First episode to air on MTV Canada.
| 327 | 10 | "You Got Me" | October 10, 2013 | October 10, 2013 | 1310 |
Still unable to cope with Adam's death, Drew resorts to an unhealthy method to get more sleep. Also, Alli tries to change her friends' perception of Leo and soon realizes that it will be a difficult task.
| 328 | 11 | "You Oughta Know" | October 17, 2013 | October 17, 2013 | 1311 |
The opportunity to write for a professional magazine is offered to Clare but her brain after cancer is not cooperating. Tristan surprises everyone and himself when he makes the basketball team alongside Miles. Imogen finds it impossible to work alongside Becky after Adam's death.
| 329 | 12 | "Everything You've Done Wrong" | October 24, 2013 | October 24, 2013 | 1312 |
Clare tries to concoct any excuse to save her reputation with the magazine but doesn't want to play the cancer card. Tristan's as Degrassi's drug dealer is threatened when a student learns what he really is dealing. Imogen tries to look beyond her guilt and give Becky a chance.
| 330 | 13 | "Who Do You Think You Are" | October 31, 2013 | October 31, 2013 | 1313 |
Focusing more on her music than Miles, Maya lets Zoë talk her into making a sexy music video. When Dallas starts making a habit of really irresponsible behavior, Drew gets concerned that his friend is depressed. This is the 400th episode in the Degrassi franchise.
| 331 | 14 | "Barely Breathing" | November 7, 2013 | November 7, 2013 | 1314 |
After learning who is behind the backlash, Maya is hellbent on revenge, but it lands her in hot water. Hiding her bruise under make-up, Alli tries to focus on her SATs and bury her problems with Leo
| 332 | 15 | "Black or White" | November 14, 2013 | November 14, 2013 | 1315 |
Tension arises between Winston and Drew after a scathe piece is aired on Degrassi TV. Meanwhile, in class, Tristan questions an offer from Zoe as a way to get back at Maya. Also, Clare is excited about Eli's return, but her happiness is short-lived however when Eli has some news of his own.
| 333 | 16 | "Spiderwebs" | November 21, 2013 | November 21, 2013 | 1316 |
In the fall finale, Drew is excited that Bianca is returning home for the holidays, however, quickly learns after one semester away at university, Bianca has other plans in mind. Tired of playing opposite sides, Tristan comes up with a plan to force Maya and Zoe to mend fences. Claire has trouble moving on from Eli's confession. Note: This marks the final appearance of Alicia Josipovic as Bianca DeSousa.
Part 3
| 334 | 17 | "The World I Know" | January 28, 2014 | January 28, 2014 | 1317 |
It's Alli's big 18th, but all she can think about is Leo being sent back to France. Maya returns from suspension, only to find she'll be stuck in a new class with a former friend. Drew is working with a mayoral candidate.
| 335 | 18 | "Better Man" | February 4, 2014 | February 4, 2014 | 1318 |
Alli is still lying to protect Leo, but her stories are beginning to unravel. Maya shows her rubber room classmates that she isn't a princess. Drew needs someone to help him prep for an important interview.
| 336 | 19 | "Dig Me Out" | February 11, 2014 | February 11, 2014 | 1319 |
Drew attempts juggling his new job and his new girl. To forget about Leo, Alli focusses on her science experiment. After getting thrown out of class for forgetting to wear a bra, Imogen plans a scathing piece for Degrassi TV.
| 337 | 20 | "Power to the People" | February 18, 2014 | February 18, 2014 | 1320 |
Drew decides he has to break up with Zoë. Alli partners up with Dallas in an attempt to stay focused on her science experiment. Imogen takes her dress code fight online.
| 338 | 21 | "No Surprises" | February 25, 2014 | February 25, 2014 | 1321 |
A shocking discovery leads Miles to question his family life. Eli is slipping away, and Clare finds herself growing closer to Drew. Dallas wants to be with Alli, but the truth about her relationship with Leo could send him over the edge.
| 339 | 22 | "Basket Case" | March 4, 2014 | March 4, 2014 | 1322 |
Clare tries to get over her feelings for Drew; Dallas comes up with a plan for Alli to confront Leo about him beating her, and Drew becomes angry when he is tricked by Miles who throws a party without his dad's permission.
| 340–341 | 23–24 | "Unbelievable" | March 11, 2014 | March 11, 2014 | 1323 & 1324 |
With rumors swirling about Zoë's drunken adventures at a recent party, Becky files a DTV report about teen girls and alcohol. When she uncovers a video of Zoë and two unidentifiable guys, she knows there's a bigger story. But once she discovers the truth and sees how deeply this story will affect everyone involved, Becky questions if she's doing the right thing.
| 342 | 25 | "What It's Like" | March 18, 2014 | March 18, 2014 | 1325 |
Maya tries to help Zig out of a tough situation. Jenna sets her sights on winning the semi-formal king and queen crowns with Connor. Becky worries she will lose Imogen as a friend when new student Jack arrives.
| 343 | 26 | "Close to Me" | March 25, 2014 | March 25, 2014 | 1326 |
Becky tries to get back in bestie rhythm with Imogen at the semi-formal, but is there more to their relationship than friendship? Miles goes to extreme lengths when he worries he'll lose Maya to Zig.
| 344 | 27 | "Army of Me" | April 1, 2014 | April 1, 2014 | 1327 |
Dallas feels he's being racially profiled after he and Connor are held for questioning in connection with a terror incident. Tristan is determined to join Mr. Yates' new Theatre Collective.
| 345 | 28 | "Everything Is Everything" | April 8, 2014 | April 8, 2014 | 1328 |
Tristan confronts Mr. Yates about his harsh Drama class criticisms and finds out the shocking truth behind them. Dallas loses his cool at the National Science Fair, letting down Alli in the process.
| 346 | 29 | "Sparks Will Fly" Part One | April 15, 2014 | April 15, 2014 | 1329 |
While Degrassi prepares for Wild Wild West Night, Zoë lands her dream role, it hits a little too close to home following her assault. Clare has some tough decisions to make as she searches for a date to Wild Wild West Night. Miles focuses on settling the score with Zig Note: This marks the final appearance of Cory Lee as Winifred "Winnie" Oh.
| 347 | 30 | "Sparks Will Fly" Part Two | April 22, 2014 | April 22, 2014 | 1330 |
Fireworks begin at Wild Wild West Night when Clare makes her decision known with regards to Drew and Eli. Zoë struggles to stand up for herself. Miles and Zig face off in a showdown for Maya's heart.
Part 4
| 348 | 31 | "You Are Not Alone" | June 3, 2014 | June 3, 2014 | 1331 |
Maya is doing her best to keep Zig safe but when she snoops and finds a bag of drugs, her worst fears are confirmed. Winston is on the prowl for his first ladyfriend when he realizes the perfect girl has been under his nose for years.
| 349 | 32 | "Enjoy the Silence" | June 10, 2014 | June 10, 2014 | 1332 |
Hiding Zig out at the Matlin house while the Maya organizes the Art Night seems to be working… for now. But will she be able to keep the gang away? Clare is deparate for answers from Drew.
| 350 | 33 | "How Bizarre" | June 17, 2014 | June 17, 2014 | 1333 |
Becky feels isolated at home since helping turn in her brother. Looking for a distraction, she finds her escape in online gaming.
| 351 | 34 | "My Hero" | June 24, 2014 | June 24, 2014 | 1334 |
Becky's gaming adventures have turned into online dates, but when she realizes her knight is not who he says he is, she must put a stop to it. Drew is in trouble! He was fired from the campaign, his friends think he's a home-wrecker, and gets in a fight with Dallas
| 352 | 35 | "Hypnotize" | July 1, 2014 | July 1, 2014 | 1335 |
Mr. Yates is willing to help Tristan out with his writing and offers his help... if he comes to his apartment. Imogen starts showing feelings of love towards Jack and is determined to prove she can "roll" with her crowd.
| 353 | 36 | "Out of My Head" | July 8, 2014 | July 8, 2014 | 1336 |
Tristan is warned by Mr. Yates to make his feelings about their affair less obvious at school but Tristan can't help it, he's beaming. Imogen's smitten with Jack and will go to any length to impress her.
| 354 | 37 | "Believe" Part One | July 15, 2014 | July 15, 2014 | 1337 |
Zoë's trial begins and when she fears that she is being painted in a harsh light, she takes matters into her own hands. Becky is torn up about what she's going to say when she takes the stand as a character witness in her brother's trial.
| 355 | 38 | "Believe" Part Two | July 22, 2014 | July 22, 2014 | 1338 |
As the trial continues, the tensions are high from all sides. The media is abuzz about Zoë's trial. Feeling hopeless and worried about her tarnished reputation, Zoë is nervous as the verdict approaches. Becky is torn about what to say in her testimony, but deep down knows what she has to do.
| 356—357 | 39—40 | "Thunderstruck" | July 29, 2014 | July 29, 2014 | 1339 & 1340 |
2 weeks has passed since the trial, and everyone is eager to move on and have fun at the huge end-of-semester dance. Moving on, however, proves more difficult than they anticipated when a Superstorm hits Toronto and New York, where Clare is preparing for her Columbia interview. With no choice but to stay indoors, the students face the secrets and demons they have been concealing all semester. While most people are ready for a fresh start, one person will get news that could jeopardize their future.

== Controversy ==
With many questions regarding the lack of a DVD release, executive producer Stephen Stohn posted on Twitter and Facebook:

Here's the scoop on the Season 13 DVD: it's confusing. We delivered all the elements a long long time ago, but then our distributor changed and there is misunderstanding whether the old or new distributor is responsible for the S13 DVD. They are working it out, please stand by!

— Stohn on the release of the Degrassi season 13 DVD.

The decision to kill off Adam Torres, the only transgender character in the show's history, during this season garnered fan backlash. In a statement, LGBT media watchdogs GLAAD said:

When Degrassi introduced its large and loyal audience to Adam Torres, an authentic, multi-dimensional transgender character, the show not only made television history, but set a new standard industry standard for LGBT inclusion. With so few transgender characters on television, we are disappointed that Adam's story had to end this way, and we hope other shows will follow Degrassi's lead in bringing stories like his to viewers...

Linda Schuyler, one of the show's creators, defended the choice to kill the character, saying in a statement:

The combination of Adam being a favorite character, and Jordan being at the end of her contract, presented a unique opportunity to tell this story through such a beloved character. As saddened as we are to say goodbye to Adam, we feel this storyline will affect even more lives in an authentic way...
