= Adamo Ruggiero =

Canadian actor

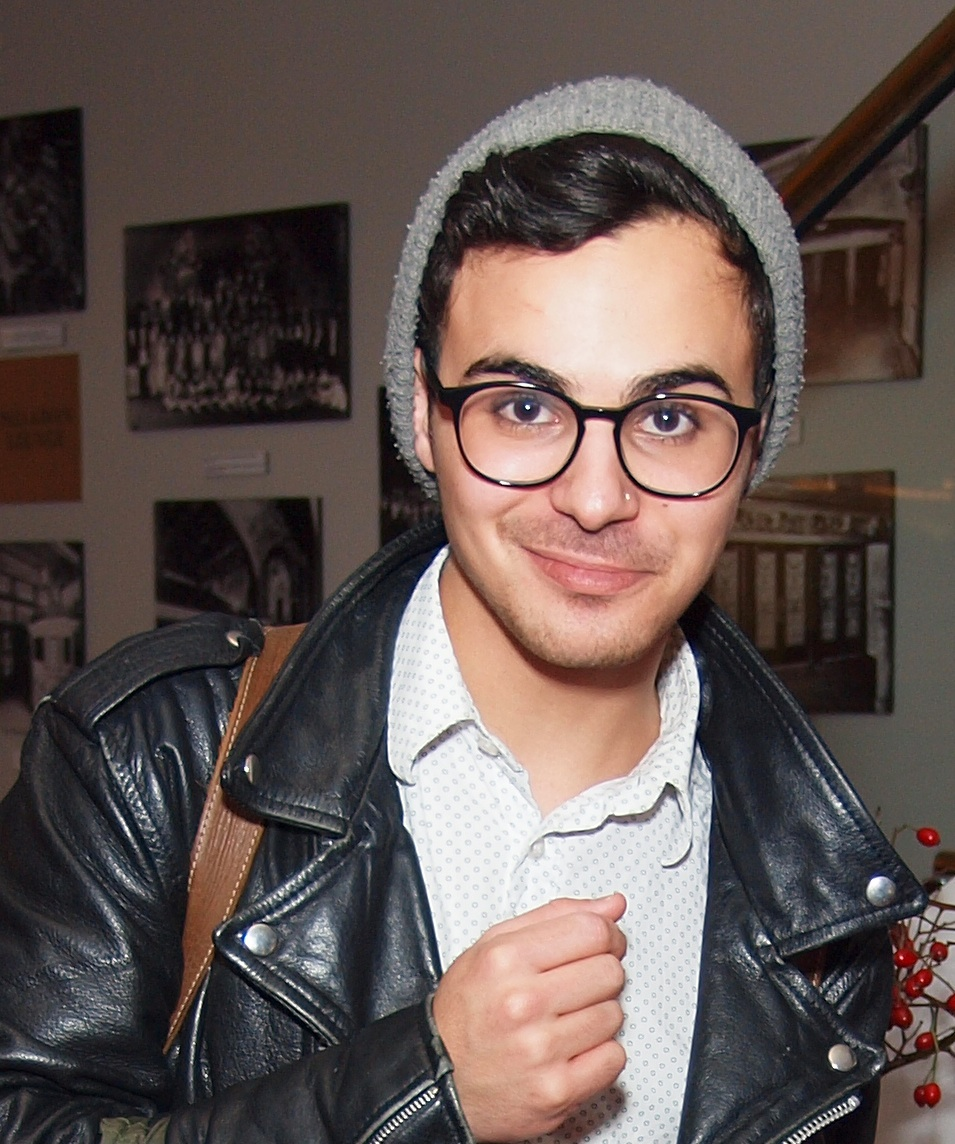
- Ruggiero in 2010
- Born: Adamo Angelo Ruggiero; June 9, 1986 (age 39); Mississauga, Ontario, Canada
- Occupations: Actor, host
- Years active: 2002–present

Adamo Angelo Ruggiero (born June 9, 1986) is a Canadian actor best known for his role as Marco Del Rossi in Degrassi: The Next Generation.

== Career ==
Ruggiero has been acting since the age of seven or eight. He has starred in many plays including Rudolph the Red-Nosed Reindeer and Bye Bye Birdie. After initially auditioning for the role of Craig Manning, a role played by Jake Epstein, he joined the Degrassi cast in 2002 with the role of Marco Del Rossi, a gay teenager who struggles to come to terms with his sexuality. Ruggiero hosted The Next Star from 2008 until 2012. In November 2008, it was announced that Ruggiero would star in the gay-themed Christmas film Make the Yuletide Gay. Principal filming started December 3, 2008.

In 2012, Ruggiero starred in the Young People's Theatre's production of The Neverending Story.

In 2013, Ruggiero participated in Salvatore Antonio's Truth/Dare: A Satire (With Dance), an interactive audience participation show which featured staged reenactments of scenes from Madonna's 1991 film Truth or Dare, at Buddies in Bad Times during Toronto's Pride Week. The show's cast also included Keith Cole and Gavin Crawford.

== Personal life ==
Ruggiero's father, Tony, was born in Coreno Ausonio, Frosinone, Lazio, Italy. Ruggiero's mother's name is Amalia. He has an older brother named Adriano, and he is from an Italian Catholic family. Ruggiero attended the Roman Catholic St. Dunstan Elementary School and graduated from Cawthra Park Secondary School, both in Mississauga, Ontario.

Ruggiero is gay, having come out in January 2008 saying "I come from a traditional Italian family but they aren't so traditional that me being gay was a deal breaker." He was also on the cover of the January 23 – February 5, 2008, issue of fab magazine.

== Filmography ==
=== Films ===
Year	Title	Role	Notes
2009	Make the Yuletide Gay	Nathan Stanford	
2009	Degrassi Goes Hollywood	Marco Del Rossi	Television film
2012	The Pool Date	Rio	Short film
2013	Gaysian	Geoff	Short film
2014	Dear Viola	Brian Southern	Television film

=== Television ===
Year	Title	Role	Notes
2002–2009	Degrassi: The Next Generation	Marco Del Rossi	Recurring role (season 2, 2002–2003); Series regular (seasons 3–7, 2003–2008); Guest appearances (seasons 8–9, 2008–2009)
2005–2007	Degrassi: Minis	Marco Del Rossi	9 episodes
2007	Canada's Next Top Model	Self	Episode: "Getting Carried Away"
2007	Degrassi: Doing What Matters	Self	TV special
2008–2012	The Next Star	Himself	Host
2010	Being Erica	Luis	Episodes: "Jenny From the Block", "Two Wrongs"
2015	Straight Talk with Adamo Ruggiero	Himself	Web-series
2015	Saving Hope	Donnie Patrillo	Episode: "Hearts of Glass"
2015	MsLabelled	Duke	5 episodes
2016	Degrassi: Next Class	Marco Del Rossi	Episode: "#ThrowBackThursday"

Music video
Year	Title	Artist	Role
2018	"I'm Upset"	Drake	Self
