= Ashley Comeau =

Canadian actress, writer and television producer (born 1984)

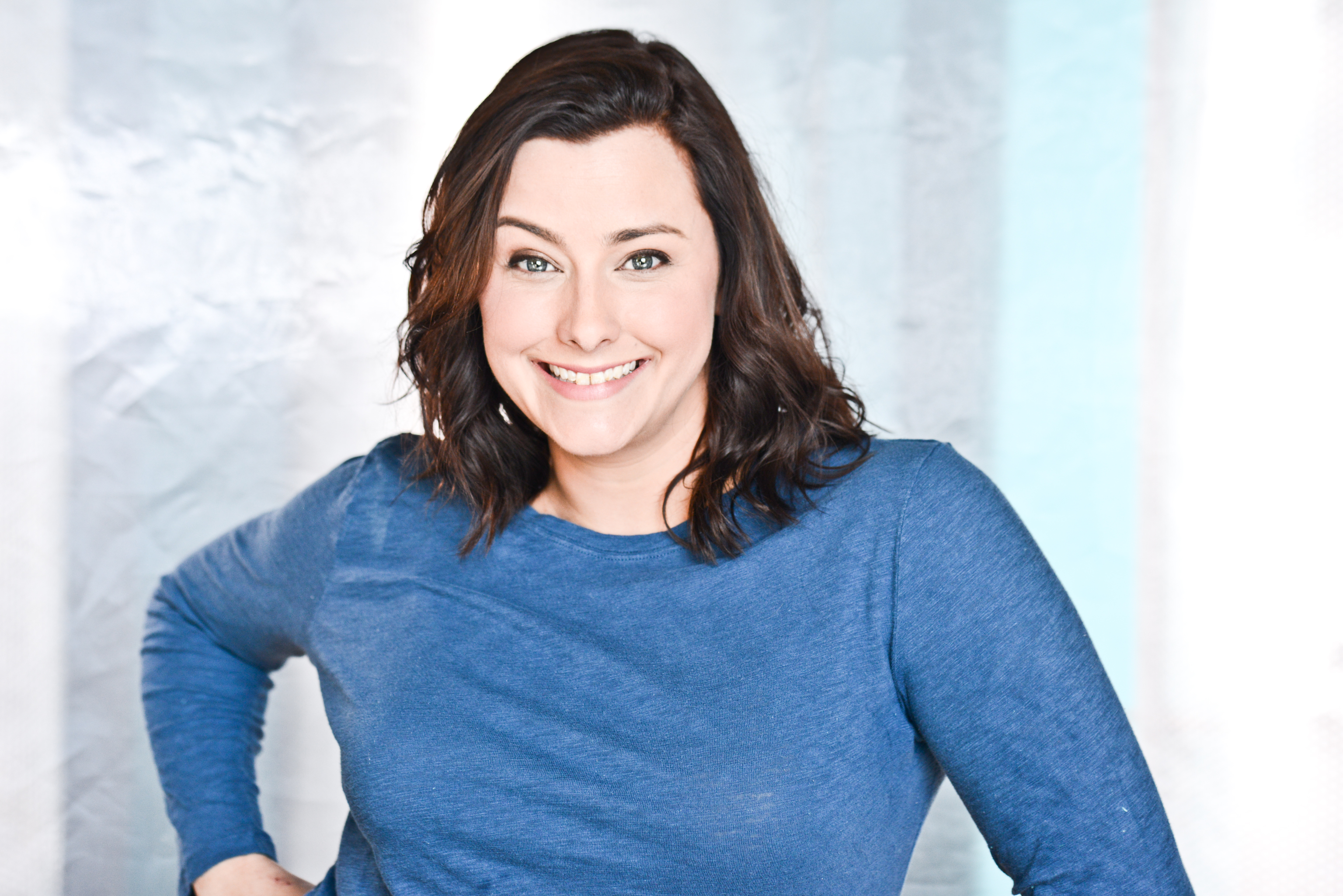
- Born: July 31, 1984 (age 42); Brampton, Ontario, Canada
- Education: Mayfield Secondary School; Humber College
- Occupations: Actress, writer, improviser, comedian, television producer
- Organization: Second City
- Agent: Alicia Faucher at Element Talent Management
- Partner: Connor Thompson
- Awards: Canadian Comedy Award Winner 2019, 'Best Female Improviser 2015' from Now Magazine's Best Of 2015
- Website: http://www.ashleycomeau.com/

Ashley Comeau (born July 31, 1984) is a Canadian actress, writer, and television producer. She is best known as an alumna of the Second City Toronto and for her role as Ms. Badger on Degrassi: Next Class.

== Early life ==
Comeau was born in Brampton, in 1984. She attended Mayfield Secondary School At Mayfield, she started competing in the Canadian Improv Games. She graduated from Humber College's Comedy Writing and Performance Program and Second City's Conservatory Program in 2008.

== Career ==
At age nine, Comeau's interest in acting began when she started doing impersonations of Dana Carvey's character Garth from Wayne's World. She studied at Humber College (in their Comedy Program) and with the Second City Conservatory.

She is an alumna of the prestigious Second City Toronto mainstage where she wrote and starred in three revues. These reviews garnered her a Dora nomination and Canadian Comedy Award nominations. She would win Best Ensemble at the 2019 Canadian Comedy Awards for being part of Second City's first all-female-identifying revue She The People. She The People would go on to headline Just for Laughs in Montreal and was a part of Mirvish's 2020 subscription year.

She continues to act and tour with her sketch troupe The Lusty Mannequins. She co-founded The Lusty Mannequins with her partner Connor Thompson. The Lustys also includes Karen Parker and Alastair Forbes; all four of the troupe are Second City mainstage alumni. In 2019 they won both 'Best of the Fest' at the Toronto Sketch Comedy Festival and 'Best Comedy Characters' from Phoenix UK at the Edinburgh Fringe Festival.

She acts, writes and produces for television and film, and performs live across the world. In 2021 she was the Consulting Producer on TallBoyz for CBC. In 2022 Ashley was the story editor on the reboot of Teletubbies on Netflix.

== Personal life ==
Ashley Comeau is a Queer bi/pansexual. Her pronouns as she/her/hers. In May 2018 she married her long time partner Connor Thompson at a surprise wedding in The Asylum in Peckham, England. She lives with Connor and their rescue dog as settlers in Tkaronto, Canada.
