= Amir Bageria =

Canadian actor

- Born: Amir Rathaur-Bageria; 25 October 2000 (age 25); Mississauga, Ontario, Canada
- Occupation: Actor
- Years active: 2016–present

Amir Rathaur-Bageria (born 25 October 2000) is a Canadian actor who began his career as a child actor. He is known for his television roles in Degrassi: Next Class and Grand Army.

== Life and career ==
Bageria is from Mississauga, Ontario and is of Indian descent. He attended Rick Hansen Secondary School in Mississauga. His mother, Parmjit Rathaur, is a psychotherapist and his older brother, Kabir, is a cruise director. Amir began acting in local productions from a young age, starting with a family friendly adaptation of Macbeth when he was in the third grade. He was one of the youngest actors on Degrassi: Next Class, landing the main role of Baaz Nahir when he was 14. In 2019, he was cast as Siddhartha "Sid" Pakam in the 2020 Netflix series Grand Army.

== Filmography ==
Year	Title	Role	Notes
2016–2017	Degrassi: Next Class	Baaz Nahir	Main role
2018	Behind the Black Curtain	Louis	Episode: "Jackie Brown"
2019	Resolve	Zayn	Short film
2020	Grand Army	Siddhartha "Sid" Pakam	Main role
