= Ricardo Hoyos =

Canadian actor (born 1995)

- Born: Ricardo Antonio Hoyos, Jr. November 27, 1995 (age 30); Alliston, Ontario, Canada
- Occupation: Actor
- Years active: 2007–present
- Parent(s): Ricardo Hoyos, Sr. Eileen Hoyos

Ricardo Antonio Hoyos, Jr. (born November 27, 1995) is a Canadian actor. He joined the cast of Degrassi: The Next Generation for the eleventh season as Zig Novak and starred in the sequel series Degrassi: Next Class on Netflix. He has also starred in the children's television series Dino Dan.

== Early life ==
Hoyos was born in Alliston, Ontario, to a father of Ecuadorian, Peruvian, French-Canadian descent, and a Canadian mother of Irish ancestry. He is the older brother of actor Lucius Hoyos.

== Acting career ==
At the age of twelve, Hoyos began his professional acting career as a child actor in 2007, when he appeared in episodic roles in the television shows: 'Til Death Do Us Part, Good Morning World, The Rick Mercer Report, Super Why!, Haven, The Haunting Hour: The Series, Life with Boys, Flower Shop Mysteries, Raising Expectations, Killjoys, Love Daily and Riverdale. He also has appeared in the films: Outlander and The Belko Experiment.

Hoyos made his film debut in the 2007 television film The Secret of the Nutcracker directed by Eric Till, portraying Sasha.

Hoyos played the role of Jacob in the anthology film Toronto Stories, which was premiered at the Toronto International Film Festival on September 9, 2008 and was released on December 12, 2008.

In 2010, Hoyos played the recurring role of Ricardo Sanchez in the children's television series Dino Dan.

In 2012, Hoyos played the voice role of Apex in the animated series Redakai: Conquer the Kairu.

From 2012 to 2015, Hoyos was cast in the role of Zig Novak in the teen drama series Degrassi: The Next Generation. He reprised his role in the television sequels Degrassi: Minis and Degrassi: Next Class. Repeated his role in 2015 in the special movie for television Degrassi: Don't Look Back.

In 2016, Hoyos played the role of Jack Diaz in comedy film Sadie's Last Days on Earth opposite Morgan Taylor Campbell, Clark Backo, Munro Chambers and Paula Brancati.

In 2017, Hoyos starred along with Vivica A. Fox, Lesli Kay and Victoria Konefal in the 2017 television film The Wrong Crush directed by David DeCoteau, portraying Jake Jericho. On the same year, Hoyos played the role of Luke Wyler in the supernatural horror film Truth or Dare directed by Nick Simon, which was released on OCtober 8, 2017.

In 2018, Hoyos appeared in the sci-fi action film Bumblebee directed by Travis Knight, based on the Hasbro's Transformers toy line character of the same name, in which he played the role of Tripp Summers.

== Filmography ==
=== Film ===
Year	Title	Role	Notes
2007	Back in '93	Tino	Short film
2008	Outlander	Jon	Uncredited
2008	Toronto Stories	Jacob	
2008	What You Eat	Young Robert	Short film
2009	The Armoire	Tony	Short film
2014	Billy the Kid	William McCarty	Short film
2014	Gramps	James	Short film
2016	The Belko Experiment	Guard 2	
2016	Sadie's Last Days on Earth	Jack Diaz	
2018	Bumblebee	Trip	

=== Television ===
Year	Title	Role	Notes
2007	'Til Death Do Us Part	Johnny	Episode 5: "Time Capsule Murder"
2007	Good Morning World	Jimmy, Allister's nephew	Episode #1.17
2007	The Secret of the Nutcracker	Sasha	Television film
2007–09	The Jon Dore Television Show	Young Jon	Recurring role, 10 episodes
2008	The Rick Mercer Report	Boy in Shell Ad Parody	Season 6, episode 6
2009	Super Why!	Additional Voice / Ugly Duckling Brother 1	2 episodes
2010	Haven	Bobby Mueller	Season 1, episode 2: "Butterfly"
2010	Dino Dan	Ricardo Sanchez	Recurring role, 16 episodes
2011	The Haunting Hour: The Series	Bill	Season 1, episode 13: "Black Mask"
2012	Redakai: Conquer the Kairu	Apex	Voice; 5 episodes
2012–2015	Degrassi: The Next Generation	Zig Novak	Main role (seasons 11–14), 92 episodes
2013	Life with Boys	Wyatt	Season 2, episode 9: "Chasing Rats With Boys"
2015	Degrassi: Minis	Zig Novak	10 episodes
2015	Degrassi: Don't Look Back	Zig Novak	TV film
2016	Flower Shop Mysteries	Kenny Lipinski	Miniseries; Episode: "Flower Shop Mystery: Snipped in the Bud"
2016	Raising Expectations	Lou	Season 1, episode 3: "Conner's Date"
2016	Killjoys	Olan	2 episodes
2016–2017	Degrassi: Next Class	Zig Novak	Main role (seasons 1-4), 35 episodes
2017	The Wrong Crush	Jake Jericho	Television film
2017	Truth or Dare	Luke Wyler	Television film
2019	Love Daily	Jake	Episode 13: "Last First Kiss"
2022	Riverdale	Heraldo	3 episodes

=== Music Videos ===
Year	Title	Artist
2019	"Die From A Broken Heart"	Maddie & Tae

== Awards and nominations ==
Year	Award	Category	Nominated work	Result	Ref.
2010	Young Artist Awards	Best Performance in a Short Film - Young Actor	The Armoire	Nominated	
2011	Young Artist Awards	Best Performance in a TV Series - Guest Starring Young Actor 14-17	Haven	Nominated	
2011	Young Artist Awards	Best Performance in a TV Series - Recurring Young Actor	Dino Dan	Nominated	
2011	Young Artist Awards	Outstanding Young Ensemble in a TV Series (shared with Jason Spevack, Sydney Kuhne, Isaac Durnford, Jaclyn Forbes)	Dino Dan	Won	
2012	Young Artist Awards	Best Performance in a TV Series - Guest Starring Young Actor 14-17	R.L. Stine's The Haunting Hour (Episode: "The Black Mask")	Nominated	
