= Stefan Brogren =

Canadian actor and director (born 1972)

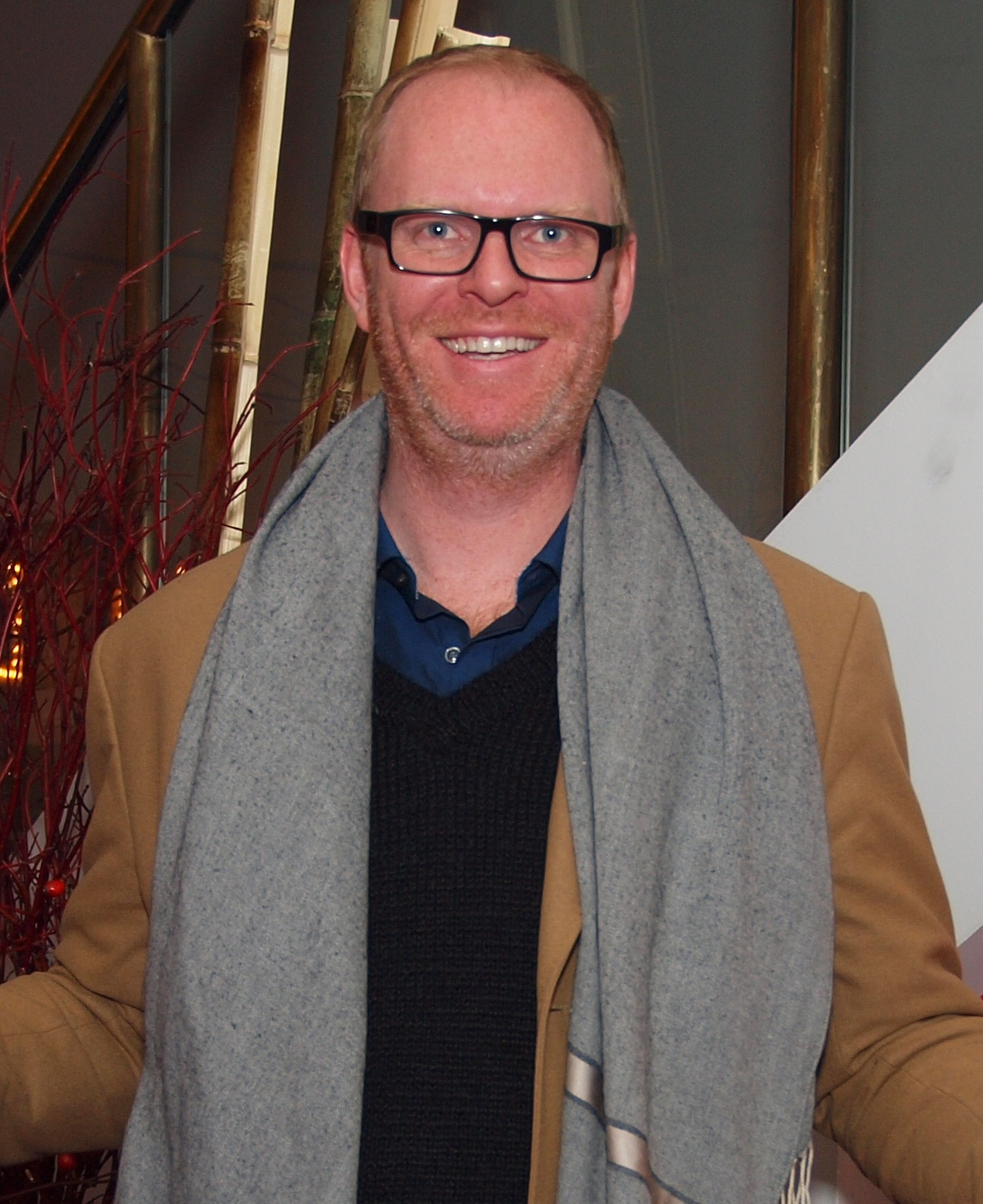
- Brogren in November 2010
- Born: 21 April 1972 (age 54); Toronto, Ontario, Canada
- Occupations: Actor, director, producer
- Years active: 1987–present
- Spouse: Michelle Shaughnessy (m. 2019)

Stefan Brogren (born 21 April 1972) is a Canadian actor, director, and producer who is best known for his mainstay role as Archie "Snake" Simpson in the Degrassi television franchise. First appearing as a student in the second series Degrassi Junior High (1987–1989) and continuing into Degrassi High (1989–1991), Brogren played the role of Snake throughout every subsequent entry in the franchise, reprising his role in Degrassi: The Next Generation (2001–2015) as a teacher and later principal, and again in Degrassi: Next Class (2016–17).

He was later a producer of The Next Generation and Next Class and directed numerous episodes of both series, winning a Gemini Award for his directorial work in 2010.

== Early life ==
Stefan Brogren was born on 21 April 1972, in Toronto, Ontario, Canada. Brogren's father is of Swedish descent.

== Career ==
Brogren has portrayed Archie "Snake" Simpson since his teen years, as a student in Degrassi Junior High and Degrassi High in the late 1980s and the early 1990s, and then as a media teacher and principal in Degrassi: The Next Generation (2001-2015). With the exception of The Kids of Degrassi Street, Brogren has appeared in every Degrassi series as a regular cast member. Brogren was the first Canadian actor to use the word "fuck" on Canadian primetime television, on the Degrassi High TV movie, School's Out! when he was discussing Joey Jeremiah's sexual escapades with Tessa Campanelli.

In 1999, Brogren starred in the music video for "Rock Past It" by pop-metal band Scratching Post.

Brogren made his directing debut with Degrassi of the Dead, a non-canonical horror episode, which aired on Halloween 2007. The 15-minute webisode depicted several Degrassi characters attempting to escape from other characters who had become zombies as a result of eating genetically modified food. The show was followed by a behind-the-scenes/making-of presentation during which he was introduced as the director. He has directed many episodes since and became a series producer in the eleventh season.

Brogren is one of two directors of The L.A. Complex which, like Degrassi, was produced by Epitome Pictures.

He appeared in Drake's 2018 music video for "I'm Upset", which takes place during a Degrassi reunion.

In 2022, he released his suspense thriller film Obsessed to Death.

== Personal life ==
He resides in Toronto, Ontario, Canada. He is 6 feet 4 inches (6'4") tall and was married to Canadian comedian and actress Michelle Shaughnessy.

== Filmography ==
=== Film ===
Year	Title	Role	Notes
1998	Hairshirt	Timothy "Tim" Wright	Also known as "Too Smooth"
2001	Focus	Bodyguard	
2001	Invitation	Stefan	
2002	Drummer Boy	Family Doctor	
2003	The Happy Couple	Dwayne's Friend	
2003	Masterpiece Monday	Joe	Short film
2004	Denied	Donald	
2005	Pizza Shop		Short film
2006	Succubus	Larry	Short film
2008	Bitten (Vampire Apocalypse)	Bearded Man	
2022	Sneakerella	Shoe Executive	

=== Television ===
Year	Title	Role	Notes
1987–1989	Degrassi Junior High	Archibald "Snake" Simpson	
1990–1991	Degrassi High	Archibald "Snake" Simpson	
1991	C.B.C's Magic Hour	Basketball Teammate	Episode: "The Prom"
1992	School's Out	Archibald "Archie" Simpson	Television movie
1995–1996	Liberty Street	Brandon	3 episodes
1997	La Femme Nikita	Security Guard	1 episode
1997	Wind at My Back	Bowser	Episode: "Something from Nothing"
1998	Twitch City	Tyler Fawcett	Episode: "I Slept with My Mother"
1999	I Was a Sixth Grade Alien	Corky	1 episode
2001	Prince Charming	Bob Worthington	Television movie
2001–2015	Degrassi: The Next Generation	Archibald "Archie" Simpson	Main role
2001	The Endless Grind	Howard	Episode: "The Endless Grind of Race"
2001	Life with Judy Garland: Me and My Shadows	Oscar Camerman	2 episodes
2001	Witchblade	Leeman Bostwick	Episode: "Convergence"
2002	The Associates	Grady Pascoe / Rudy Pasco	2 episodes
2003	Wild Card	Motel Clerk	Episode: "No Bull"
2003	Martha, Inc.: The Story of Martha Stewart		Television movie
2004	Sue Thomas: F.B. Eye	Brian Guthrie	Episode: "Political Agenda"
2004	Evel Knievel	Bob Tuax	Television movie
2005	Kojak	Terry	Episode: "East Sixties"
2005	Martha Behind Bars	Federal Agent #1	Television movie
2010	Degrassi Takes Manhattan	Archibald "Archie" Simpson	Television movie
2016–2017	Degrassi: Next Class	Archibald "Archie" Simpson	8 episodes
2018	Very, Very, Valentine	Mr. Carlisle	Television movie
2020	Canada's Drag Race	Himself	1 episode
2020	Private Eyes	Dean Carl Robinson	Episode: "Tappa Kegga Daily"
2020	A Christmas Break	Phil Johnson	Television movie
2021	American Gods	High Priest Olaffson	Episode: "Fire and Ice"
2022	Air Crash Investigation	NTSB Investigator Macintosh	Episode: "Turboprop Terror"

=== Web series ===
Year	Title	Role	Notes
2005–2006	Degrassi: Minis	Archibald "Archie" Simpson	5 episodes

=== Music videos ===
Year	Title	Artist
1999	"Rock Past It"	Scratching Post
2018	"I'm Upset"	Drake

== Filmmaking credits ==
Year	Title	Director	Producer	Writer	Notes
2006–2007	Instant Star	Yes	No	Yes	2 episodes
2008	Degrassi: Minis	Yes	Yes	Yes	Episode "The Curse of Degrassi"
2009–2015	Degrassi: The Next Generation	Yes	Yes	No	51 episodes
2009	Degrassi Goes Hollywood	Yes	Yes	No	Television movie
2010	Degrassi Takes Manhattan	Yes	Yes	No	Television movie
2012	The L.A. Complex	Yes	Yes	No	7 episodes
2015	Open Heart	Yes	Yes	No	8 episodes
2016–2017	Degrassi: Next Class	Yes	Yes	No	20 episodes
2016–2017	Raising Expectations	Yes	No	No	2 episodes
2018–2022	Holly Hobbie	Yes	Yes	No	23 episodes
2021	A Mother's Lie	Yes	No	No	Television movie
2021	A Chance for Christmas	Yes	No	No	Television movie
2022	Obsessed to Death	Yes	No	No	
2023	Welcome to Valentine	Yes	No	No	Television movie
2023	Popularity Papers	Yes	Yes	No	5 episodes
2023	Twisted Neighbor	Yes	No	No	
2024	Billion Dollar Bluff	Yes	No	No	

== Awards and nominations ==
Year	Award	Category	Series	Result	Ref.
1989	Gemini Award	Best Performance by a Lead Actor in a Continuing Dramatic Role	Degrassi Junior High	Nominated	
1990	Young Artist Award	Outstanding Young Ensemble Cast	Degrassi High	Nominated	
2002	Gemini Award	Geminis' Hottest Star	Degrassi: The Next Generation	Nominated	
2010	Gemini Award	Best Children's or Youth Fiction Program or Series	Degrassi: The Next Generation	Nominated	
2010	Gemini Award	Best Direction in a Children's or Youth Program or Series	Degrassi: The Next Generation (Episode "Beat It: Part 2")	Won	
2011	Gemini Award	Best Children's or Youth Fiction Program or Series	Degrassi: The Next Generation	Won	
2011	Primetime Emmy Awards	Outstanding Children's Program	Degrassi: The Next Generation	Nominated	
2012	Directors Guild of Canada	Outstanding Directorial Achievement in Family Series	Degrassi: The Next Generation (episode "Dead and Gone: Part 2")	Nominated	
2012	Primetime Emmy Awards	Outstanding Children's Program	Degrassi: The Next Generation	Nominated	
2013	Canadian Screen Awards	Best Children's or Youth Fiction Program or Series	Degrassi: The Next Generation	Won	
2014	Canadian Screen Awards	Best Children's or Youth Fiction Program or Series	Degrassi: The Next Generation	Won	
2014	Canadian Screen Awards	Best Direction in a Children's or Youth Program or Series	Degrassi: The Next Generation	Won	
2014	Primetime Emmy Awards	Outstanding Children's Program	Degrassi: The Next Generation	Nominated	
2015	Primetime Emmy Awards	Outstanding Children's Program	Degrassi: The Next Generation	Nominated	
2015	Canadian Screen Awards	Best Children's or Youth Fiction Program or Series	Degrassi: The Next Generation	Nominated	
2016	Canadian Screen Awards	Best Children's or Youth Fiction Program or Series	Degrassi: The Next Generation	Nominated	
2016	Directors Guild of Canada	Outstanding Directorial Achievement in Family Series	Degrassi: Next Class (episode: "#Sorrynotsorry")	Nominated	
2016	Directors Guild of Canada	Outstanding Directorial Achievement in Family Series	Degrassi: Next Class (episode: "Bootycall")	Nominated	
2017	Directors Guild of Canada	Outstanding Directorial Achievement in Family Series	Degrassi: Next Class (episode: "#ImSleep)	Nominated	
2017	Canadian Screen Awards	Best Children's or Youth Fiction Program or Series	Degrassi: Next Class	Nominated	
2018	Canadian Screen Awards	Best Children's or Youth Fiction Program or Series	Degrassi: Next Class	Nominated	
2020	Canadian Screen Awards	Best Direction in a Children's or Youth Program or Series	Holly Hobbie	Nominated	
2020	Daytime Emmy Awards	Outstanding Children's or Family Viewing Program	Holly Hobbie	Nominated	
2021	Canadian Screen Awards	Best Direction in a Children's or Youth Program or Series	Holly Hobbie	Nominated	
2023	Canadian Screen Awards	Best Children's or Youth Fiction Program or Series	Holly Hobbie	Nominated	
