= Degrassi: The Next Generation season 5 =

Degrassi: The Next Generation
- Season 5
- Degrassi: The Next Generation Season 5 DVD
- Showrunner: James Hurst
- No. of episodes: 19

Release
- Original network: CTV
- Original release: September 19, 2005 – March 20, 2006

Season chronology
- ← Previous; Season 4 Next → Season 6

The fifth season of Degrassi: The Next Generation commenced airing in Canada on September 19, 2005, concluded on March 20, 2006 and contains nineteen episodes. Degrassi: The Next Generation is a Canadian serial teen drama television series. This season depicts the lives of a group of high school tenth, eleventh, and twelfth grade students as they deal with some of the challenges and issues teenagers face such as body image, teenage pregnancy, drug dealing, coming out, sexual identity, religion, eating disorders and relationships.

Filming took place between May 2005 and November 2005.

Season five aired Mondays at 8:30 p.m. on CTV, a Canadian terrestrial television network. In the United States, it was broadcast on the Noggin cable channel during its programming block for teenagers, The N. The season was released on DVD as a four disc boxed set on July 3, 2007 by Alliance Atlantis Home Entertainment in Canada, and by FUNimation Entertainment in the US. The season is also available on iTunes. The N Soundtrack was released on August 1, 2006, following this season.

The fifth season of Degrassi: The Next Generation was the most successful season to date, averaging 767,000 viewers in Canada, and had one episode watched by a million viewers. It received praise for its depiction of a relationship between two gay characters, but mixed reviews for highlighting the issue of anorexia and bulimia in teenage girls.

== Cast ==
The fifth season features twenty actors who receive star billing, with sixteen of them returning from the previous season. Mike Lobel (Jay), Deanna Casaluce (Alex), Jamie Johnston (Peter) and Melissa DiMarco (Hatzilakos) join the main cast, replacing Melissa McIntyre (Ashley), Daniel Clark (Sean) and Dan Woods (Mr. Raditch).

=== Main cast ===
- Stacey Farber as Ellie Nash (10 episodes)
- Miriam McDonald as Emma Nelson (13 episodes)
- Mike Lobel as Jay Hogart (7 episodes)
- Deanna Casaluce as Alex Nuñez (9 episodes)
- Andrea Lewis as Hazel Aden (11 episodes)
- Cassie Steele as Manuela "Manny" Santos (14 episodes)
- Lauren Collins as Paige Michalchuk (15 episodes)
- Ryan Cooley as James Tiberius "J.T." Yorke (14 episodes)
- Aubrey Graham as Jimmy Brooks (13 episodes)
- Jake Epstein as Craig Manning (11 episodes)
- Shane Kippel as Gavin "Spinner" Mason (10 episodes)
- Jake Goldsbie as Toby Isaacs (14 episodes)
- Sarah Barrable-Tishauer as Liberty Van Zandt (13 episodes)
- Amanda Stepto as Christine "Spike" Nelson (6 episodes)
- Stefan Brogren as Archie "Snake" Simpson (13 episodes)
- Pat Mastroianni as Joey Jeremiah (4 episodes)
- Stacie Mistysyn as Caitlin Ryan (1 episode)
- Jamie Johnston as Peter Stone (10 episodes)
- Melissa DiMarco as Daphne Hatzilakos (13 episodes)
- Adamo Ruggiero as Marco Del Rossi (14 episodes)

=== Recurring cast ===
Former and future series regulars who appear this season in recurring roles include:

- Shenae Grimes as Darcy Edwards (8 episodes)
- Marc Donato as Derek Haig (6 episodes)
- Dalmar Abuzeid as Danny Van Zandt (5 episodes)
- Jajube Mandiela as Chantay Black (3 episodes)
- Melissa McIntyre as Ashley Kerwin (2 episodes)

Other recurring cast members include Linlyn Lue as Ms. Laura Kwan and Michael Kinney as Coach Darryl Armstrong.

Film director Kevin Smith and actor Jason Mewes returned to the show for two episodes where they guest starred as exaggerated versions of themselves. The episodes depict the premiere of Jay and Silent Bob Go Canadian, Eh!, a fictional feature film in the View Askewniverse series that used Degrassi Community School as a filming location during season four. The scenes Alanis Morissette had filmed in season four to play the film's school principal were replayed as part of the film at the premiere. Degrassi High's Cathy Keenan also reprises her role as Liz O'Rourke in "I Against I".

== Crew ==
The season was produced by Epitome Pictures in association with CTV. Funding was provided by The Canadian Film or Video Production Tax Credit and the Ontario Film and Television Tax Credit, the Canadian Television Fund and BCE-CTV Benefits, The Shaw Television Broadcast Fund, the Independent Production Fund, Mountain Cable Program, and RBC Royal Bank.

The executive producers were Epitome Pictures' president Stephen Stohn, and CEO Linda Schuyler, the co-creator of the Degrassi franchise. James Hurst served as the creative producer, David Lowe was the line producer and Sean Reycraft served as the executive story editor. Brendon Yorke and Alexandra Zarowny served as story editors. The editor was Stephen Withrow, Stephen Stanley was the production designer, and the cinematographer was Gavin Smith. The writers for the season are Avra Fein, James Hurst, Aaron Martin, Miklos Perlus, Sean Reycraft, Shelley Scarrow, Brendon Yorke and Alexandra Zarowny. Phil Earnshaw, Eleanore Lindo, Ron Oliver and Stefan Scaini directed the episodes.

== Reception ==
The fifth season of Degrassi: The Next Generation had an audience average of 767,000 viewers, had an increase of twenty-four per cent over the previous season, and was Canada's most watched Canadian drama series. The second episode of the season was watched by over one million Canadian viewers; it was the first time the series had reached that figure.

A two-part episode, aired to coincide with the Canadian National Eating Disorder Awareness Week, earned mixed reviews. Laura Betker of the Winnipeg Sun said "Thankfully, the show moves far away from the health-class ideal that anorexia and bulimia simply stem from self-conscious teens. Rather, it displays it as the ugly disease that it truly is... All aspects of the story were done well. The plot was realistic. The display of the disease was truthful and progressive, while the acting was at an all time high... Miriam McDonald's performance was phenomenal. [She] performs with strength and credibility." Bill Harris of the Toronto Sun criticized the episodes' "ham-fisted handling of anorexia" and wrote: "It's just that, well, the Degrassi foray, while well-intentioned, leaves you hungry for a fresh insight, some relevant information, a compelling storyline, good writing, believable dialogue, anything." Harris even went as far as saying, "That Degrassi episode was so bad it made me want to throw up."

The show's treatment of the gay characters avoids being heavy handed or reducing their characters to little more than clichéd archetypes, such as the 'tragic' one, or the 'funny side kick', or the 'bitchy' one. Nor are these characters just the colourful friends and unpaid therapists of the straight girl. As much as we all love the antics of Jack on Will and Grace, Degrassi has a broader vision, less about the stereotype and more about the realities of growing up gay. This depiction is certainly pink, but without being rose colored.

— Jake Surette, AfterElton.com, April 24, 2006.

Other storylines were well received, however. AfterElton.com, a website which focuses on the portrayal of homosexual and bisexual men in the media, and owned by MTV Networks' Logo cable television network, reported on the portrayal of two Degrassi: The Next Generation gay characters. "Degrassi features ongoing stories of real-life teen dilemmas—including intense gay and lesbian storylines—and does it without the righteous, 'On a Very Special Blossom' endings that many teen dramas and sitcoms thrive on." The Gonzaga Bulletin, the student newspaper for Gonzaga University in Spokane, Washington, reported on the show's popularity amongst its students.

Despite being well received by audiences and the generally good reviews, season five received only two nominations for awards. At the Gemini Awards, Jim McGrath won the category for "Best Original Music Score for a Dramatic Series". The younger members of the cast were nominated for a Young Artist Award in the "Best Young Ensemble Performance in a TV Series (Comedy or Drama)" category.

== Episodes ==
In a change to previous seasons, CTV broadcast episodes one and two over two weeks, as opposed to an hour-long special. In the United States, Noggin's "The N" block aired the episodes as an hour-long special on October 7, 2005. The N proceeded to broadcast the next ten episodes, and then put the season on hiatus until April 7, 2006, when it returned with another hour-long special.

No. overall	No. in season	Title	Directed by	Written by	Canada airdate	U.S. airdate	Prod. code
82	1	"Venus: Part 1"	Phil Earnshaw	Story by : Sean Reycraft & Shelley Scarrow; Teleplay by : Shelley Scarrow	September 19, 2005	October 7, 2005	501
In her pursuit to become a Hollywood actress, Manny contemplates getting plastic surgery after a casting agent criticizes her weight, and it does not sit well with her parents. Meanwhile, it is Craig's birthday, and Ellie decides to hide the fact that Ashley has a new boyfriend and is staying in London. Note: This episode marks the first appearance of Jamie Johnston as Peter Stone.
83	2	"Venus: Part 2"	Phil Earnshaw	Story by : Sean Reycraft & Shelley Scarrow; Teleplay by : Shelley Scarrow	September 26, 2005	October 7, 2005	502
When Manny rejects him, Peter releases the video of Manny flashing her breasts to the entire student body, which causes her whole life to fall apart. Meanwhile, Ellie and Craig are still mad at each other but later form a connection when she becomes Downtown Sasquatch's new drummer.
84	3	"Death of a Disco Dancer"	Stefan Scaini	Sean Reycraft	October 3, 2005	October 14, 2005	503
Paige has her whole future planned out: She is going to the best Canadian university, Banting, she will live with Matt, and everything will be perfect. That is, until Matt comes back a changed man. Meanwhile, Jimmy is proud to be the new basketball coach, but a new member, Derek, causes trouble. Note: This episode marks the first appearance of Marc Donato as Derek Haig.
85	4	"Foolin"	Stefan Scaini	Story by : Brendon Yorke & Miklos Perlus; Teleplay by : Brendon Yorke	October 10, 2005	October 21, 2005	504
J.T. is happily in love with Liberty until she reveals that she is four months pregnant. The couple experiences problems as reality begins to set in. Meanwhile, when they begin dating, Spinner grows worried that Darcy will find out about his involvement in the school shooting.
86	5	"Weddings, Parties, Anything"	Phil Earnshaw	Story by : James Hurst & Alexandra Zarowny; Teleplay by : James Hurst	October 17, 2005	November 4, 2005	505
Downtown Sasquatch has a wedding gig, and Craig decides to put all of his focus on the music, but things get complicated when Manny and Ellie vie for Craig's attention. Meanwhile, Joey has a date with the bride's sister but wonders if he is too old for her when he overhears her friends gossiping about him.
87	6	"I Still Haven't Found What I'm Looking For"	Phil Earnshaw	Story by : Miklos Perlus & James Hurst; Teleplay by : Miklos Perlus	October 24, 2005	November 11, 2005	506
At his father's urging, Jimmy tries out for the National Wheelchair Sports Association's Junior Basketball Team, even though he wants to concentrate on his art. Meanwhile, Liberty and J.T. attempt to keep Danny from telling their parents about her pregnancy.
88	7	"Turned Out: Part 1"	Eleanore Lindo	Brendon Yorke	October 31, 2005	November 18, 2005	507
Liberty and J.T. are back together and looking to buy an apartment, but with no income, J.T. resorts to stealing and selling drugs to a dealer. Meanwhile, Emma, tired of being a "third wheel" to Manny and Craig, decides to go on a date with Derek, but she really wants to be with Peter.
89	8	"Turned Out: Part 2"	Eleanore Lindo	Brendon Yorke	November 7, 2005	December 2, 2005	508
J.T. learns that getting out of the drug-dealing business is dangerous as he travels down a path of self-destruction that could cause him to lose the people about whom he cares the most. Meanwhile, Snake faces similar obstacles when he looks back onto his life and realizes that he is not happy.
90	9	"Tell It to My Heart"	Stefan Scaini	Brendon Yorke	November 14, 2005	December 9, 2005	509
While helping his new friend Tim, Marco faces his own reality and contemplates coming out to his father. Meanwhile, Emma likes the attention Peter gives her, even though she knows it would hurt Manny.
91	10	"Redemption Song"	Stefan Scaini	Story by : Alexandra Zarowny & James Hurst; Teleplay by : Alexandra Zarowny	November 21, 2005	December 16, 2005	510
The one-year anniversary of the school shooting opens up old wounds for everyone involved. Spinner goes with Darcy to the Friendship Club's annual retreat, where he has to deal with his demons. Jimmy has to choose what direction he wants to take when it comes to Hazel and Ellie.
92	11	"The Lexicon of Love: Part One"	Phil Earnshaw	Story by : Sean Reycraft & Kate Melville; Teleplay by : Sean Reycraft	November 28, 2005	April 7, 2006	511
At the premiere of Jay and Silent Bob Go Canadian, Eh! Paige and Alex discover they enjoy each others' company as more than friends. Meanwhile, Emma, on a date with her new secret boyfriend Peter, discovers another secret couple at the premiere—Snake and Ms. Hatzilakos. Special Guest Stars: Kevin Smith and Jason Mewes.
93	12	"The Lexicon of Love: Part Two"	Phil Earnshaw	Story by : Sean Reycraft & Kate Melville; Teleplay by : Sean Reycraft	December 5, 2005	April 7, 2006	512
Alex and Paige are still confused over what happened the night before, and Kevin Smith helps Paige deal with her sexuality. Meanwhile, Emma feels compelled to tell her mother about what she saw, but when Snake asks her to keep it a secret, she has to make a difficult choice. Special Guest Stars: Kevin Smith and Jason Mewes.
94	13	"Together Forever"	Ron Oliver	Story by : Aaron Martin & Brendon Yorke; Teleplay by : Aaron Martin	December 12, 2005	April 14, 2006	513
Downtown Sasquatch have a shot at a record deal when a music producer shows interest in them, but they later find out he is only interested in Craig, who has to make a difficult choice. Meanwhile, Liberty prepares to give birth while dealing with the stresses of school.
95	14	"I Against I"	Stefan Scaini	Story by : Aaron Martin & Brendon Yorke; Teleplay by : James Hurst	January 30, 2006	April 21, 2006	514
The Friendship Club's opinions on sex and homosexuality threaten Spinner's newly repaired friendship with Marco. Meanwhile, Spike's friends visit her in order to cheer her up on her and Snake's third anniversary.
96	15	"Our Lips Are Sealed: Part 1"	Stefan Scaini	Story by : Kate Melville & Sean Reycraft; Teleplay by : Kate Melville	February 20, 2006	May 5, 2006	515
Emma's life is in complete chaos as she feels she is losing all control. She soon finds her solution when she and Manny go on a strict diet regime, which includes cutting off junk food, exercising, and purging. Meanwhile, tired of living with Joey, Snake makes an attempt to reconcile with Spike. Note: This episode marks the final appearance of Pat Mastroianni as Joey Jeremiah.
97	16	"Our Lips Are Sealed: Part 2"	Ron Oliver	Story by : James Hurst & Avra Fein; Teleplay by : James Hurst & Alexandra Zarowny	February 27, 2006	May 12, 2006	516
Emma's downward spiral continues as her dangerous diet turns into a full-blown eating disorder, and it could have dire consequences for her as her loved ones come together to help her. Meanwhile Alex and Hazel try playing nice for Paige, who is tired them being at each other's throats.
98	17	"Total Eclipse of the Heart"	Ron Oliver	Story by : Aaron Martin & James Hurst; Teleplay by : Aaron Martin	March 6, 2006	May 19, 2006	517
Marco is interested in the prospect of a new romance with Tim, but when Dylan comes back into his life, he realizes their relationship might not be over. Liberty is overcome with guilt over giving up her baby for adoption after finding out the family is moving away.
99	18	"High Fidelity: Part One"	Phil Earnshaw	Brendon Yorke	March 13, 2006	June 2, 2006	518
The students prepare for Degrassi's 50th anniversary variety show with Manny in charge. Spinner makes the mistake of lying to a jealous Darcy about his sexual past with Manny, causing issues in their relationship. Paige and Alex's relationship comes to an end when Paige becomes too controlling about Alex's future after graduation.
100	19	"High Fidelity: Part Two"	Phil Earnshaw	James Hurst	March 20, 2006	June 9, 2006	519
In the special 100th episode, Graduation has arrived for the Class of 2006, when two of their former classmates return for the celebratory event. After his night with Paige, Spinner is torn after Darcy tells him that she wants to get back together. Jimmy has to repeat his senior year after missing too much school while recovering from being shot and wonders if his feelings for Ellie are requited. Note: This episode marks the final appearance of Andrea Lewis as Hazel Aden, and the reappearance of Melissa McIntyre as Ashley Kerwin.

== DVD release ==
The DVD release of season five was released by Alliance Atlantis Home Entertainment in Canada, and by FUNimation Entertainment in the US on July 3, 2007 after it had completed broadcast on television. As well as every episode from the season, the DVD release features bonus material including deleted scenes, bloopers and behind-the-scenes featurettes.

The Complete Fifth Season
Set details	Special features
19 director's cut episodes; 4-disc set; 1.33:1 aspect ratio; Languages: English (Dolby Digital 5.1)	Deleted scenes; Blooper reel; Original cast auditions; Interview with Cassie Steele; Character and cast biographies; Degrassi yearbook; Simple Plan music video and interview; Trailers
Release dates	Deleted scenes; Blooper reel; Original cast auditions; Interview with Cassie Steele; Character and cast biographies; Degrassi yearbook; Simple Plan music video and interview; Trailers
(Canada) (United States) Region 1	Deleted scenes; Blooper reel; Original cast auditions; Interview with Cassie Steele; Character and cast biographies; Degrassi yearbook; Simple Plan music video and interview; Trailers
3 July 2007	Deleted scenes; Blooper reel; Original cast auditions; Interview with Cassie Steele; Character and cast biographies; Degrassi yearbook; Simple Plan music video and interview; Trailers
