= High Fidelity (Degrassi: The Next Generation) =

- Degrassi: The Next Generation episodes
- Former lovers Spinner and Paige find comfort in each other after both find themselves with an ended relationship.
- Episode nos.: Season 5 Episodes 18 & 19
- Directed by: Phil Earnshaw
- Written by: James Hurst
- Production code: 518 & 519
- Original air dates: 13 March 2006; 20 March 2006
- Running time: 44 minutes

Guest appearances
- Shenae Grimes as Darcy Edwards; Melissa McIntyre as Ashley Kerwin

Episode chronology
← Previous "Total Eclipse Of The Heart"	Next → "Here Comes Your Man"
- Degrassi: The Next Generation (season 5)

"High Fidelity" is a two-part episode of Degrassi: The Next Generation, directed by Phil Earnshaw, that was broadcast as the final episode in season five. In Canada, the first part premiered on CTV on 13 March 2006, and the second part premiered on 20 March. The second part is also the hundredth episode of the series.

This two-part episode is the final episode where the entire cast is still in high school or a teacher until season eleven. It is also the final episode of the last season to have the school year take place over the entire season before switching to have one semester per season.

== Main plot synopsis ==
=== Part One ===
Spinner lies to Darcy about being a virgin when he and Darcy are kissing; Darcy stops him before going too far. Spinner lies and says he never was sexually active with Manny. Darcy believes him and verbally bashes Manny over her sexual past. When Manny is seeking help for the upcoming "Fifty Years of Degrassi" history festival, Spinner volunteers so he can take his mind off sex and other girls while Darcy is away at bible camp for the summer. Darcy starts to become jealous of Spinner's friendship with Manny. Darcy tries to convince Manny to join the Friendship Club and repent for the sins she has committed in the past for a fresh pure start. Manny tells Darcy she does not want to live that lifestyle. Darcy says Spinner is capable of it but Manny accidentally reveals that she and Spinner had sex when they were together.

Spinner wants to make things right with Darcy, so he asks Marco's help with his revirginizing ceremony. Marco gladly agrees even though he's had past altercations with the Friendship Club due to his homosexuality. Spinner completes the ceremony and Darcy is happy that he made the decision. When the two have a picnic together, Darcy cannot stop thinking about Spinner's past and Spinner says that she is jealous of it. Spinner ultimately breaks up with Darcy due to her actions and finds comfort in his ex-girlfriend, Paige, who also has just ended her relationship with Alex. Paige and Spinner start talking and Spinner says he will drive her home since it is late, only to end the night with a kiss.

=== Part Two ===
Spinner confides in Marco about his romantic encounter with someone besides Darcy the night before. Marco asks if he is ok with the break-up and asks who he kissed. Paige walks into the room and Spinner awkwardly answers Paige's greeting and questions, inadvertently revealing to Marco that Paige was the one Spinner kissed the night before. Darcy returns to Spinner shortly after and begs for his forgiveness and leaves him to think about it.

When the class goes to graduate, Spinner and Jimmy begin to talk and have an actual conversation for the first time in over a year. Finally understanding why he bullied Rick a year ago and how much he meant to Terri, Spinner rekindles his friendship with Jimmy, and Spinner realizes that he should chase after Darcy so they can be together for his final year of high school. Spinner drives after her and catches her as she is about to get onto the bus for camp. Spinner apologizes for all his mistakes and promises to make it up to her. Darcy says that she's not sure if she can forgive him this time, but she looks back at him as she gets on the bus, which gives Spinner hope.

The episode ends with the graduating class throwing up their graduation caps and all the students exchanging congratulatory hugs.

== Hundredth episode ==
The second part was the series' hundredth episode and CTV celebrated the event by throwing a cast party and advance screening of the episodes in Downtown Toronto. Many fans were invited to be a part of the event by answering questions about Degrassi on CTV's website.

== Music ==
Many songs were used in this episode of Degrassi.

- "Doesn't Anybody Hear" by The Novaks
- "Dullsville" by The Novaks
- "Tell Me" by Donatella
- "A Line To Stand Behind" by Boy
- "Light After Night" by Jakalope
- "Man By The Door" by The Novaks
- "Your Ex-Lover Is Dead" by Stars

== Broadcast ==
The first part of "High Fidelity" first aired in Canada on CTV on 13 March 2006, and the second part first aired on 20 March. In the United States, the two parts first aired on 2 and 9 June 2006 on Noggin's programming block for teenagers, The N.
