= Degrassi: The Next Generation season 6 =

Degrassi: The Next Generation
- Season 6
- Degrassi: The Next Generation Season 6 DVD
- Showrunner: James Hurst
- No. of episodes: 19

Release
- Original network: CTV (Canada); The N (block on Noggin, United States)
- Original release: November 28, 2006 – May 14, 2007

Season chronology
- ← Previous; Season 5 Next → Season 7

The sixth season of the Canadian teen drama television series Degrassi: The Next Generation commenced airing in Canada on November 28, 2006, concluded on May 14, 2007 and contains nineteen episodes. This season depicts the lives of high school juniors, seniors and graduates as they deal with some of the challenges and issues young adults face such as imprisonment, online predators, burglary, substance abuse, stress, gambling addiction, financial difficulties, school rivalries, pregnancy scares and death. This is the first season in franchise history to feature college aged characters in prominent roles. Unlike the previous seasons, which took place over the course of an entire school year, season six only covers the fall semester (September to December) of the school year, utilizing a semi-floating timeline. It also marks the first death of a main character in the series.

Production took place between May and December 2006.

Season six also aired in the United States Fridays at 8:00 p.m. on the Noggin cable channel during its programming block for teenagers, The N. The season actually premiered on The N, on September 29, 2006, two months before CTV, a Canadian terrestrial television network, began to screen it. By broadcasting two episodes every Tuesday night at 8:00 p.m. and 8:30 p.m., CTV were able to broadcast the final ten episodes of the season before The N. The season was released on DVD as a four disc boxed set on 27 May 2008 by Alliance Atlantis Home Entertainment in Canada, and FUNimation Entertainment in the United States. The season is also available on Canadian and US iTunes.

The season received eight award nominations, six more than it received for season five. It received mixed reviews from the media, and lackluster ratings compared to the previous season's record high of one million viewers.

== Cast ==
The sixth season features seventeen actors who receive star billing, with fifteen of them returning from the previous season. Daniel Clark (Sean) returns and Shenae Grimes (Darcy) joins the main cast, replacing Andrea Lewis (Hazel), Jake Epstein (Craig), Jake Goldsbie (Toby), Pat Mastroianni (Joey) and Stacie Mistysyn (Caitlin).

=== Main cast ===
- Miriam McDonald as Emma Nelson (13 episodes)
- Cassie Steele as Manuela "Manny" Santos (15 episodes)
- Daniel Clark as Sean Cameron (11 episodes)
- Stacey Farber as Ellie Nash (13 episodes)
- Lauren Collins as Paige Michalchuk (8 episodes)
- Aubrey Graham as Jimmy Brooks (12 episodes)
- Shane Kippel as Gavin "Spinner" Mason (16 episodes)
- Shenae Grimes as Darcy Edwards (11 episodes)
- Mike Lobel as Jay Hogart (8 episodes)
- Deanna Casaluce as Alex Nuñez (9 episodes)
- Stefan Brogren as Archie "Snake" Simpson (16 episodes)
- Amanda Stepto as Christine "Spike" Nelson (6 episodes)
- Ryan Cooley as James Tiberius "J.T." Yorke (7 episodes)
- Sarah Barrable-Tishauer as Liberty Van Zandt (9 episodes)
- Jamie Johnston as Peter Stone (11 episodes)
- Melissa DiMarco as Daphne Hatzilakos (10 episodes)
- Adamo Ruggiero as Marco Del Rossi (14 episodes)

=== Also starring ===
The following cast members are given a "starring" credit after the opening theme and only for episodes where they appear:

- Jake Goldsbie as Toby Isaacs (10 episodes)
- Melissa McIntyre as Ashley Kerwin (7 episodes)
- Jake Epstein as Craig Manning (2 episodes)

=== Recurring cast ===
The following cast members appear in recurring roles, and would be promoted to the main cast in subsequent seasons:

- Nina Dobrev as Mia Jones (8 episodes)
- Marc Donato as Derek Haig (8 episodes)
- Dalmar Abuzeid as Danny Van Zandt (8 episodes)
- Jajube Mandiela as Chantay Black (4 episodes)
- Aislinn Paul as Clare Edwards (2 episodes)
- Scott Paterson as Johnny DiMarco (2 episodes)
- Mazin Elsadig as Damian Hayes (2 episodes)

Other recurring cast members include Steve Belford as Jesse Stefanovic, John Bregar as Dylan Michalchuk and Michael Kinney as Coach Darryl Armstrong.

Future cast members Samantha Munro and Charlotte Arnold make uncredited cameo appearances as extras.

== Crew ==
The season was produced by Epitome Pictures in association with CTV. Funding was provided by The Canadian Film or Video Production Tax Credit and the Ontario Film and Television Tax Credit, the Canadian Television Fund and BCE-CTV Benefits, The Shaw Television Broadcast Fund, the Independent Production Fund, Mountain Cable Program, and RBC Royal Bank.

Linda Schuyler, co-creator of the Degrassi franchise and CEO of Epitome Pictures, was the co-executive producer of season six with her husband and Epitome Pictures' president, Stephen Stohn. James Hurst also served as an executive producer. David Lowe served as the producer, and Shelley Scarrow was the executive creative consultant. Brendon Yorke and Nicole Demerse were co-executive story editors, with Duana Taha as the junior story editor. The editors were Stephen Withrow and Jason B. Irvine, Stephen Stanley was the production designer, and the cinematographers were Gavin Smith and John Berrie. The writers for the season are Tassie Cameron, Nicole Demerse, James Hurst, Aaron Martin, Will Pascoe, Shelley Scarrow, Duana Taha, and Brendon Yorke. Phil Earnshaw, Eleanore Lindo, Stefan Scaini, Gavin Smith, and Sudz Sutherland directed the episodes.

== Reception ==
Season six was watched by fewer Canadian viewers than season five, which achieved an average of 767,000 viewers, and had one episode watched by a million viewers. The first twelve episodes of season six only averaged 500,000 viewers; the first episode after the winter break, broadcast on March 28, 2007, was watched by a season high of 645,000 viewers. The season finale was watched by 520,000 viewers, and the season eventually averaged 522,000 viewers.

Years after compromising its integrity for a shot at the more superficial US market, Degrassi: The Next Generation makes a welcome return to form with a season finale that trades, not in the high school stereotypes it has lately relied upon, but on a tempestuous same-sex romance that mines real emotions with poignant dramatic effect.

— Joel Rubinoff, Waterloo Region Record

The sixth season received mixed reviews from the media. Laura Betker of the Winnipeg Sun said, "Wrapping up plot lines so quickly creates a bit of disappointment for audiences. Typically, season finales end with exciting cliffhangers to entice fan interest. Degrassi's finale really had no loose ends. There is no pending excitement for fans and the two-part finale became a disappointment. The episodes felt more like a series finale rather than just a season ending." In his end of year review, Joel Rubnoff of the Waterloo Region Record said Degrassi: The Next Generation was one of the best shows of 2007, adding, "The greatest teen show on the planet rediscovers its mojo with a same sex romance between control freak Paige and teen rebel Alexa. The year's most compelling—and bittersweet—love story." AfterEllen.com, a website which focuses on the portrayal of lesbian and bisexual women in the media, and owned by MTV Networks' Logo cable television network reported on the portrayal of two Degrassi: The Next Generation lesbian characters. "Paige and Alex's relationship, developed over three seasons, has become one of the best portrayals of a lesbian teen relationship we've seen on American television," said Sarah Warn, the website's Editor in Chief, before giving the series an "A" Grade for the portrayal of class issues, character development, sexual orientation, dialogue, the relationship and lesbian sex.

The season received nominations for eight different awards, and won two. At the Directors Guild of Canada Awards, the episode "Can't Hardly Wait" was nominated in the category for "Outstanding Achievement in a Television Series – Family", and Stephen Stanley was nominated in the "Outstanding Achievement in Production Design – Television Series" category for "What's it Feel Like To Be a Ghost? Part Two". At the Gemini Awards, Shenae Grimes won the category for "Best Performance in a Children's or Youth Program or Series" for her portrayal of Darcy Edwards in the episode "Eyes Without a Face Part Two". Degrassi: The Next Generation received three other Gemini Award nominations, for "Best Children's or Youth Fiction Program or Series", "Best Original Music Score for a Dramatic Series", and "Best Sound in a Dramatic Series". In the US, the series won its second Teen Choice Award for "Choice Summer TV Show", and Marc Donato was nominated for "Best Performance in a TV Comedy Series Recurring Young Actor" at the Young Artist Awards.

== Episodes ==
Season six premiered during Noggin's teen-oriented block, "The N," two months before its CTV debut. It was not until the ninth episode that Canadian viewers were able to watch an episode before US viewers. The N aired the season in three separate waves, airing the first third of the season between September 29, 2006 and November 17, 2006, then the second run of episodes between January 5, 2007 and February 16, 2007. The final episodes of the season were broadcast between 29 June 2007 and 3 August 2007. Every episode aired on Fridays at 8:00 p.m.

In Canada, CTV aired the season in two separate waves of episodes. The first twelve episodes aired between November 28, 2006 and January 9, 2007, on Tuesdays at 8:00 p.m. and 8:30 p.m. The second wave of episodes aired between March 28, 2007 and May 14, 2007. The first two episodes in this wave aired on Wednesdays at 9:30 p.m., immediately after CTV's simulcast of American Idol; from April 9, 2007, the remaining episodes aired on Mondays at 9:30 p.m., immediately following CTV's simulcast of Dancing with the Stars. CTV also broadcast episodes fourteen and fifteen before episode thirteen.

This list is by order of production, as they appear on the DVD.

No. overall	No. in season	Title	Canada airdate	U.S. airdate	Prod. code
101–102	1–2	"Here Comes Your Man"	November 28, 2006	September 29, 2006	601 & 602
Emma is happy being with Peter—that is, until Sean returns to town and enrolls at Degrassi for the upcoming school year. She soon finds herself drawn to Sean as he and Peter get caught up in the street-racing scene. Meanwhile, Marco grows overwhelmed when he has to juggle moving his stuff into his apartment with Dylan, choosing university courses with Ellie, and throwing Paige a going away party. Also, Ellie struggles to deal with her new roommate and writes an anonymous article about it for the school newspaper. Note: This episode marks the reappearance of Daniel Clark as Sean Cameron.
103	3	"True Colours"	December 5, 2006	October 6, 2006	603
Due to Jay's pleas, Emma visits Sean in jail where she realizes that he is in a lot of pain and does everything she can to help him out. Meanwhile, Ellie is devastated to discover that the first newspaper article she has written has been rejected.
104	4	"Can't Hardly Wait"	December 5, 2006	October 13, 2006	604
Jimmy starts coaching the girls' basketball team and wants to take his relationship with Ashley to the next level but, since his paralysis, he has not been able to get an erection. Meanwhile, Darcy, as the new Spirit Squad captain, clashes with choreographer Manny over new girl Mia. Note: This episode marks the first appearance of Nina Dobrev as Mia Jones.
105	5	"Eyes Without a Face" Part One	December 12, 2006	October 20, 2006	605
Darcy is tired of her good-girl reputation and strives for something more exciting. When Peter introduces her to an online admirer through her MyRoom page, Darcy begins exchanging racy photos of herself for gifts. Meanwhile, trying to move on from Liberty, J.T. finds himself interested in the new girl, Mia. Note: This episode marks the first appearance of Aislinn Paul as Clare Edwards.
106	6	"Eyes Without a Face" Part Two	December 12, 2006	November 3, 2006	606
Darcy continues to post risqué pictures on the internet. But she soon realizes how dangerous it is when her biggest fan decides that it is time to meet face to face. Meanwhile, Ellie doesn't want to be seen as a "little girl" in front of her older boyfriend and contemplates losing her virginity.
107	7	"Working for the Weekend"	December 19, 2006	November 10, 2006	607
Spinner is upset over the results of his aptitude test, and when Jimmy decides to design and sell T-shirts, they go into business and open a store. Meanwhile, Alex returns to Degrassi to get more credits, but her bullying past comes back to haunt her.
108	8	"Crazy Little Thing Called Love"	December 19, 2006	November 17, 2006	608
Sean finally gets out of jail and reunites with Emma, thinking that he has the perfect girlfriend, but he soon realizes that she isn't as innocent as she seems, when he finds out what she did with Jay last year. Meanwhile, Derek has a problem when Mr. Perino begins bullying him and Danny.
109	9	"What's It Feel Like to Be a Ghost?" Part One	January 2, 2007	January 5, 2007	609
Craig returns to town for a music festival and wastes no time in reuniting with Manny but, as Craig further embraces the rock star lifestyle, Manny has to decide whether the new Craig is the guy she really loves. Meanwhile, an upset Liberty decides to tell Mia the truth about J.T.
110	10	"What's It Feel Like to Be a Ghost?" Part Two	January 2, 2007	January 12, 2007	610
Ellie blames Manny for Craig's drug addiction, even though everyone else can see that he is lying. The Degrassi/Lakehurst school rivalry is heating up, and the Lakehurst gang are out to get J.T. for dating Mia, who used to date one of their gang members. Note: This episode marks the first appearance of Scott Paterson as Johnny Dimarco. Special Guest Star: Taking Back Sunday.
111	11	"Rock This Town"	January 9, 2007	January 26, 2007	611
Manny decides to throw a party at the Nelsons' house while Spike and Snake are out of town and uses Liberty's birthday as a guise, but when word gets out, the night quickly spirals out of control leading to a tragedy that the students of Degrassi will never forget. Note: This episode marks the first appearance of Mazin Elsadig as Damian Hayes.
112	12	"The Bitterest Pill"	January 9, 2007	February 2, 2007	612
In the aftermath of J.T.'s murder, all of Degrassi are in mourning. While planning the memorial, Toby and Liberty kiss, and he soon wonders if he should let her know about J.T.'s true feelings for her. Meanwhile, Ellie decides to tell Jesse that she kissed Craig but receives some unexpected news. Note: This episode marks the final appearance of Ryan Cooley as J.T. Yorke.
113	13	"If You Leave"	April 9, 2007	February 16, 2007	613
Emma causes a riot between Degrassi and Lakehurst when she feels that J.T.'s death is being glossed over, while not knowing how to tell Manny that she doesn't want her to move back home. Meanwhile, Marco thinks Dylan is cheating on him again.
114	14	"Free Fallin'" Part One	March 28, 2007	June 29, 2007	614
Stressed at Banting, Paige has a panic attack during an exam. When her professor gives her another chance, she has to juggle catching up on her schoolwork and preparing a huge family dinner. Meanwhile, Peter wants forgiveness from Darcy but finds out he has his work cut out for him.
115	15	"Free Fallin'" Part Two	April 4, 2007	July 6, 2007	615
In the aftermath of her dorm fire, Paige decides to drop out of college and move back to Toronto due to her poor grades. She now has to deal with her reoccurring panic attacks by herself since no one can know the truth. Meanwhile, Peter is determined to show Darcy that he's changed.
116	16	"Love My Way"	April 16, 2007	July 13, 2007	616
In an attempt to return to her pre-Banting glory, Paige goes on casual dates with both Spinner and newly-single Jesse, which makes Alex jealous. Meanwhile, Snake isn't comfortable with Sean and Emma's level of intimacy.
117	17	"Sunglasses at Night"	April 23, 2007	July 20, 2007	617
Marco is having a hard time dealing with Dylan's departure and becomes addicted to online gambling. Meanwhile, Peter and Darcy have to make a decision about whether they should go public.
118	18	"Don't You Want Me?" Part One	May 7, 2007	July 27, 2007	618
Alex becomes a waitress at a gentleman's club when she and her mother start drowning in financial debt, but she soon finds out that there's more money to be made onstage. Meanwhile, Emma is upset when Sean's plans for the future do not include her.
119	19	"Don't You Want Me?" Part Two	May 14, 2007	August 3, 2007	619
Alex's double life is finally bringing in the cash, but having to hide it from Paige is taking its toll on her schoolwork and their relationship. Meanwhile, with the end of the winter term around the corner, Sean and Emma continue to fight over him joining the army and leaving her alone and pregnant.

== DVD release ==
The DVD release of season six was released by Alliance Atlantis Home Entertainment in Canada, and by FUNimation Entertainment in the US on May 27, 2008 after it had completed broadcast on television. As well as every episode from the season, the DVD release features bonus material including deleted scenes, bloopers and behind-the-scenes featurettes.

The Complete Sixth Season
Set details	Special features
19 director's cut episodes; 4-disc set; 1.33:1 aspect ratio; Languages: English (Dolby Digital 5.1)	Deleted scenes; Bloopers; Original auditions; Character and cast bios; Degrassi yearbook; Trailers
Release dates	Deleted scenes; Bloopers; Original auditions; Character and cast bios; Degrassi yearbook; Trailers
(Canada) (United States) Region 1	Deleted scenes; Bloopers; Original auditions; Character and cast bios; Degrassi yearbook; Trailers
27 May 2008	Deleted scenes; Bloopers; Original auditions; Character and cast bios; Degrassi yearbook; Trailers
