= Don't You Want Me (disambiguation) =

"Don't You Want Me" is a 1981 song by British synthpop group Human League.

Don't You Want Me may also refer to:

- "Don't You Want Me" (Felix song), 1992
- "Don't You Want Me" (Jody Watley song), 1987
- "Don't You Want Me," a 2007 two-part episode of season 6 of the Canadian television series Degrassi: The Next Generation
- Don't You Want Me?, a 2002 novel by India Knight
