= Degrassi: The Next Generation season 4 =

Degrassi: The Next Generation
- Season 4
- Degrassi: The Next Generation Season 4 DVD
- Showrunner: Aaron Martin
- No. of episodes: 22

Release
- Original network: CTV (Canada); The N (US)
- Original release: September 7, 2004 – February 14, 2005

Season chronology
- ← Previous; Season 3 Next → Season 5

The fourth season of Degrassi: The Next Generation commenced airing in Canada on September 7, 2004, concluded on February 14, 2005 and contains twenty-two episodes. Degrassi: The Next Generation is a Canadian serial teen drama television series. This season depicts the lives of a group of high school sophomores and juniors as they deal with some of the challenges and issues teenagers face such as bullying, dysfunctional families, school shootings, mental disorders, STDs, disabilities, gambling, homosexuality, and inappropriate student-teacher relationships.

Every episode is titled after a song from the 1980s, except for the two-part season finale "Goin' Down the Road", which took its name from the 1970 Canadian film Goin' Down the Road. Filming took place between April and November 2004.

The first six episodes of season four aired Tuesdays at 8:00 p.m. and 8:30 p.m. on CTV, a Canadian terrestrial television network, before settling into its regular 8:30 p.m. timeslot. When the season returned to the schedules in January 2005 following a break over the Christmas period, it aired on Mondays at 8:30 p.m. In the United States, it was broadcast on the Noggin cable channel during its programming block for teenagers, The N. The season was released on DVD as a four disc boxed set on November 28, 2006 by Alliance Atlantis Home Entertainment in Canada, and by FUNimation Entertainment in the US on October 24, 2006. The last three episodes were also sold in the US, packaged together in two different releases; one version was dubbed "unrated, uncensored and uncut" and featured an audio commentary and other bonus material, the other version was dubbed "rated", and did not feature the audio commentary. The season is available on iTunes. This was the first season to release a soundtrack, Songs from Degrassi: The Next Generation was available as a digital download on November 1, 2005.

Season four was one of Degrassi: The Next Generation's most successful seasons for viewing figures. Two episodes were watched by nearly a million Canadian viewers and helped the season garner an average audience of 600,000, making it the most-viewed domestic drama in Canada. In the US, one episode from the season was watched by over half-a-million viewers, the highest audience figure The N had ever had. Only three awards were won for the season, from a total of nine nominations.

Season four is considered to be the darkest and most controversial season of the show, due to multiple storylines that dealt with harsh and dark issues, especially the two-part episode "Time Stands Still", which involves a school shooting. This garnered the show more international attention than originally.

== Cast ==
The fourth season features nineteen actors who receive star billing. With the exception of Christina Schmidt (Terri), all cast members return from the previous season. This is the only season of the series to not add any new characters to the main cast (recurring previously or not).

=== Main cast ===
- Stacey Farber as Ellie Nash (13 episodes)
- Miriam McDonald as Emma Nelson (17 episodes)
- Aubrey Graham as Jimmy Brooks (16 episodes)
- Shane Kippel as Gavin "Spinner" Mason (16 episodes)
- Andrea Lewis as Hazel Aden (13 episodes)
- Cassie Steele as Manuela "Manny" Santos (18 episodes)
- Lauren Collins as Paige Michalchuk (16 episodes)
- Ryan Cooley as James Tiberius "J.T." Yorke (13 episodes)
- Melissa McIntyre as Ashley Kerwin (12 episodes)
- Jake Epstein as Craig Manning (21 episodes)
- Jake Goldsbie as Toby Isaacs (10 episodes)
- Sarah Barrable-Tishauer as Liberty Van Zandt (12 episodes)
- Amanda Stepto as Spike Nelson (8 episodes)
- Stefan Brogren as Archie "Snake" Simpson (16 episodes)
- Pat Mastroianni as Joey Jeremiah (8 episodes)
- Stacie Mistysyn as Caitlin Ryan (9 episodes)
- Daniel Clark as Sean Cameron (9 episodes)
- Dan Woods as Mr. Raditch (9 episodes)
- Adamo Ruggiero as Marco Del Rossi (17 episodes)

=== Recurring cast ===
The following cast members appear in recurring roles, and would be promoted to the main cast in subsequent seasons:

- Deanna Casaluce as Alex Nuñez (16 episodes)
- Mike Lobel as Jay Hogart (14 episodes)
- Melissa DiMarco as Daphne Hatzilakos (9 episodes)
- Dalmar Abuzeid as Danny Van Zandt (9 episodes)
- Shenae Grimes as Darcy Edwards (6 episodes)

Other recurring cast members include John Bregar as Dylan Michalchuk, Linlyn Lue as Ms. Laura Kwan, Alexa Steele as Angela Jeremiah, Michael Kinney as Coach Darryl Armstrong, Ephraim Ellis as Rick Murray and Christopher Jacot as Matt Oleander.

Film director Kevin Smith and actor Jason Mewes guest star as exaggerated versions of themselves (for example Kevin is portrayed as being unmarried and childless), who are at Degrassi Community School in the final three episodes of the season to work on Jay and Silent Bob Go Canadian, Eh!, a fictional feature film in the View Askewniverse series that is using Degrassi Community School as a filming location. Singer Alanis Morissette, who had previously played God in two other Jay and Silent Bob movies, guest star in "Goin' Down the Road Part One" as herself, playing the school principal in Jay and Silent Bob Go Canadian, Eh!

== Crew ==
The season was produced by Epitome Pictures in association CTV. Funding was provided by The Canadian Film or Video Production Tax Credit and the Ontario Film and Television Tax Credit, the Canadian Television Fund and BCE-CTV Benefits, The Shaw Television Broadcast Fund, the Independent Production Fund, Mountain Cable Program, and RBC Royal Bank.

The season's executive producers are Epitome Pictures' president Stephen Stohn, and CEO Linda Schuyler, the co-creator of the Degrassi franchise. Aaron Martin was promoted from executive story editor during the third season to executive producer. Degrassi: The Next Generation co-creator Yan Moore served as the creative consultant and David Lowe was the line producer. Sean Reycraft and Shelley Scarrow served as co-executive story editors. Brendon Yorke was the story editor, and Miklos Perlus the junior story editor. The editor was Stephen Withrow, Stephen Stanley was the production designer, and the cinematographer was Gavin Smith.

The writers for the season are Sean Carley, Richard Clark, R. Scott Cooper, James Hurst, Aaron Martin, Miklos Perlus, Sean Reycraft, Shelley Scarrow, Brandon Yorke. Kevin Smith was allowed to rewrite his dialogue for the episodes which he appeared in. Graeme Campbell, Philip Earnshaw, Eleanore Lindo, Ron Murphy, Sudz Sutherland, and Stefan Scaini directed the episodes.

== Reception ==
An episode featuring a storyline about a school shooting garnered the series an all-time high audience of 930,000 Canadian viewers. A second episode with a storyline about oral sex also earned just under 1,000,000 viewers. Overall, the season averaged an audience of 600,000 and was the top domestic drama for Canadian teenagers aged 12 to 17, and adults in three age brackets; ages 18 to 34, ages 18 to 49, and ages 25 to 54. In the US, the season received an 80% larger audience compared to season three, and one episode received 540,000 viewers and drew a Nielsen rating of 2.7 for teenagers and 4.7 for female teenagers, meaning that on average 2.7% of the nation's teenagers, and 4.7% of the nation's female teenagers were tuned in at any given moment.

The season was well received amongst critics, especially in regards to the episodes with Kevin Smith and the storylines on oral sex and the school shooting. The Palm Beach Post said the series "is told from a teenager's point of view since the writers have no interest in appealing to a broad-based demographic like the writers on, say, Fox's The O.C. ... it connects with teens on their level", though it was still "surprised Jay used the graphic oral sex term you'd hear in just about every high school hallway in America", that word being "blow-job". The Boston Herald said "it is important for teens to learn about sexually transmitted diseases and the cost of unprotected sex ... and should help parents begin conversations with their own children". PopMatters's Jodie Janella Horn described Degrassi: The Next Generation as "the most unnervingly accurate series ever of the high school genre". Another comparison was made between Degrassi: The Next Generation and The O.C., saying "The O.C. will never remind me of anything in my life", while the events in the two-part episode "Voices Carry" with "hotel room trashing, projectile launching, fist fighting at weddings bi-polar loon Craig [and girlfriend Ashley], was like an actual scene from my actual teenage life and just like me, Ashley thinks they're going to pull through it together". AfterElton.com, a website that focuses on the portrayal of gay and bisexual men in the media praised the series for "not only focusing on gay teens, but it showcases gay sex, and relationships. By not stereotyping [the gay characters] they are helping thousands of confused and shameful teenagers feel accepted, in Canada and America alike." Ben Neihart called Degrassi: The Next Generation "tha Best Teen TV N da WRLD!" (the best teen TV in the world) in a six-page article in The New York Times. Commenting that "the explosive-issue-per-capita ratio is seriously out of whack", he admitted that "the teen-diary attention to microissues (zits, periods, parents' night) gives the episodes a peculiar authenticity no matter how outrageous their story lines".

Two episodes were nominated for "Best Youth Script" at the Canadian Screenwriting Awards, which are administered by the Writers Guild of Canada. Shelley Scarrow's "Secrets Part One" lost out to "Mercy Street", written by James Hurst and Miklos Perlus. At the Directors Guild of Canada Awards, Stefan Sciani won the award for "Outstanding Achievement in a Television Series – Family" for the episode "Time Stands Still Part Two", and Stephen Stanley was nominated for the "Outstanding Achievement in Production Design – Television Series" category for the episode "Goin' Down the Road". The series won its first Teen Choice Award in the US for "Choice Summer Series" At the Young Artist Awards, Degrassi: The Next Generation failed to win any of the awards its actors were nominated for. Adamo Ruggiero was nominated in the "Best Performance in a TV Comedy Series Leading Young Actor" category, Aubrey Graham was nominated in the "Best Performance in a TV Comedy Series Supporting Young Actor" category, and Alex Steele was nominated in the "Best Performance in a TV Comedy Series Recurring Young Actress" category. The entire cast was nominated in the "Outstanding Young Performers in a TV Series" category".

== Episodes ==
The season premiere was an hour-long television special. CTV broadcast episodes two and three, four and five, and twenty and twenty-one on the same nights, though not as hour-long specials. In the United States, Noggin's The N block aired the season in two separate waves: the first wave began on October 1, 2004, and ran until March 11, 2005. The second wave, advertised as the "Summer '05" season, was screened between July 1, 2005, and August 26, 2005. The season premiere, and episodes 13–14, aired as hour-long specials.

No. overall	No. in season	Title	Directed by	Written by	Canada airdate	U.S. airdate	Prod. code
60–61	1–2	"Ghost in the Machine"	Phil Earnshaw	Story by : Shelley Scarrow & James Hurst; Teleplay by : Shelley Scarrow	September 7, 2004	October 1, 2004	401/402
At the end of summer and with a new school year around the corner, Paige receives some unexpected news – her rape case has made it to trial and she is the star witness. But she is shocked by the outcome of the trial, which sends her into a spiral. Note: This episode marks the first appearance of Dalmar Abuzeid as Danny Van Zandt.
62	3	"King of Pain"	Stefan Scaini	Story by : Sean Reycraft & Shelley Scarrow; Teleplay by : Sean Reycraft	September 21, 2004	October 8, 2004	403
Marco has a lot on the line when his unexpected competitor threatens to reveal his secret to homophobic father. Meanwhile, although she does not want Chris back, Emma tries to make sure he does not end up with anyone else.
63	4	"Mercy Street"	Stefan Scaini	Story by : James Hurst & Miklos Perlus; Teleplay by : James Hurst	September 21, 2004	October 15, 2004	404
After being gone for 5 months, Rick returns to Degrassi, and Emma teams up with the Juniors to try to push Rick out of Degrassi. Meanwhile, after accidentally spying Manny's ex-boyfriend Craig naked in the locker room, J.T. is worried he will not "measure" up.
64	5	"Anywhere I Lay My Head"	Phil Earnshaw	Story by : Richard Clark & Shelley Scarrow; Teleplay by : Richard Clark	September 28, 2004	October 22, 2004	405
When her mother's drinking grows worse, Ellie has to choose between staying at home or moving in with Sean. Meanwhile, with Paige sick, Manny is put in charge of the school's car wash and grows closer to Paige's boyfriend, Spinner. Note: This episode marks the first appearance of Shenae Grimes as Darcy Edwards.
65	6	"Islands in the Stream"	Phil Earnshaw	Story by : Sean Reycraft & Aaron Martin; Teleplay by : Sean Reycraft	September 28, 2004	November 26, 2004	406
In her quest to repay Spinner for damage to his car, Paige has gone all beta. Suddenly, Spin's using his new-found powers to zap whatever self-confidence Paige has left, much to the disgust of their friends. Meanwhile, Rick and Toby are partnered up in class, leading to a bet to see who can get more kisses from the girls at school.
66	7	"Time Stands Still" Part One	Stefan Scaini	Story by : Brendon Yorke & Aaron Martin; Teleplay by : Brendon Yorke	October 5, 2004	December 3, 2004	407
Rick is finally standing up for himself after he tags Spinner and Jay's car, but what he does not know is that they are not afraid to strike back. Meanwhile, Joey has to sell his house and enlists his ex-girlfriend and realtor, Sydney, to help.
67	8	"Time Stands Still" Part Two	Stefan Scaini	Story by : Brendon Yorke & Aaron Martin; Teleplay by : Brendon Yorke	October 12, 2004	December 10, 2004	408
Rick's public humiliation pushes him over the brink, prompting him to return to school equipped with a gun and seeking vengeance. The unthinkable occurs when innocent people are trapped in his destructive path, and nothing in Degrassi will ever be the same again.
68	9	"Back in Black"	Ron Murphy	Aaron Martin & Miklos Perlus	October 19, 2004	December 17, 2004	409
A week has passed since the school shooting, and everyone hails Sean as a hero, despite the fact that he does not consider himself to be one. He, Jay, Ellie, and Emma skip school and head to Wasaga Beach to confront his past. Meanwhile, Toby finds himself shunned by J.T. and Danny. Note: This episode marks the final appearance of Daniel Clark as Sean Cameron until his return in season six.
69	10	"Neutron Dance"	Ron Murphy	Story by : Sean Carley & Miklos Perlus; Teleplay by : Sean Carley	October 26, 2004	February 18, 2005	410
Craig has a problem: the recording contract he and his band earned last year is going to expire, but "Downtown Sasquatch" is far from finished. He seeks assistance from an unlikely source, which enrages the members. Meanwhile, Paige develops a crush on Matt Oleander, the teaching assistant.
70	11	"Voices Carry: Part One"	Phil Earnshaw	Sean Reycraft	November 2, 2004	February 25, 2005	411
Ashley's dad's wedding has arrived, and Craig and Ashley decide to spend the night together. Meanwhile, J.T. and Liberty work together to put on a play in order to raise school spirits.
71	12	"Voices Carry: Part Two"	Phil Earnshaw	Sean Reycraft	November 9, 2004	March 4, 2005	412
Craig's deep depression and destructive behavior starts to become more apparent to Ashley. Meanwhile, after landing themselves in detention, Liberty and J.T. share a moment that brings them closer together.
72	13	"Bark at the Moon"	Ron Murphy	Story by : Sean Reycraft; Teleplay by : Aaron Martin	November 23, 2004	March 11, 2005	413
Manny is attracted to Chester, a new guy at school, and soon wonders if Spinner is the right guy for her. Following the school shooting, Degrassi gets a new principal after Raditch gets fired. Meanwhile, Paige tries to get partnered up with Mr. Oleander, and it seems he is also interested in her. Note: This episode marks the final appearance of Dan Woods as Daniel Raditch.
73	14	"Secret: Part 1"	Eleanore Lindo	Shelley Scarrow	November 30, 2004	July 1, 2005	414
Still recovering from the shooting and with Sean gone, Emma is in trouble, but plays it off as fine and starts hanging out with Jay. Meanwhile, with the discovery of Craig's bipolar disorder, Ashley tries to get him help from a support group where he runs into Ellie.
74	15	"Secret: Part 2"	Eleanore Lindo	Shelley Scarrow	December 7, 2004	July 1, 2005	415
Emma feels alive after giving Jay "the business", but when Degrassi is plagued with a mini gonorrhea outbreak after Alex, Jay's girlfriend, becomes infected, Emma fears she has it. Meanwhile, Jimmy enlists the help of Craig and Marco to break out of the hospital and see his favorite band.
75	16	"Eye of the Tiger"	Ron Murphy	Story by : Brendon Yorke & R. Scott Cooper; Teleplay by : Brendon Yorke	December 14, 2004	July 8, 2005	416
Spinner has difficulty dealing with the return of injured Jimmy. He has not talked to him since the shooting, and his guilt over what he did leaves him unable to welcome Jimmy back to school. Meanwhile, Danny has a hard time accepting J.T. and Liberty's relationship.
76	17	"Queen of Hearts"	Sudz Sutherland	Sean Reycraft	January 17, 2005	July 15, 2005	417
Struggling to pay the rent, Ellie discovers she can earn money playing euchre. When Alex wants to play for more money, Ellie has to make a difficult choice. Meanwhile, Paige and Matt's secret affair blossoms, but Paige wonders whether he is still seeing his ex-girlfriend behind her back.
77	18	"Modern Love"	Sudz Sutherland	Story by : Miklos Perlus; Teleplay by : Shelley Scarrow	January 24, 2005	July 22, 2005	418
Paige begins to doubt her secret relationship with Matt after it is revealed. Meanwhile, Emma has a girls' night with Manny, Darcy and Chantay that turns into a prank war with Chester and his brothers. Note: This episode marks the first appearance of Jajube Mandiela as Chantay Black.
78	19	"Moonlight Desires"	Phil Earnshaw	Story by : Aaron Martin; Teleplay by : Sean Reycraft	January 31, 2005	July 29, 2005	419
Marco's organized blood drive turns political after learning that he cannot donate due to fear of HIV, and to top it off, he finds Dylan with another guy. Meanwhile, after being expelled for their part in the school shooting, Jay and Spinner take vengeance against the school.
79	20	"West End Girls"	Phil Earnshaw	Shelley Scarrow	January 31, 2005	August 12, 2005	420
The end of the school year has arrived, and the rivalry between Manny and Paige heats up as they go to extreme lengths to one-up each other, culminating into an epic showdown during the school prom. Caitlin interviews Kevin Smith, who tours Degrassi Community School as a possible location for his latest movie, Jay and Silent Bob Go Canadian, Eh!. Special guest star: Kevin Smith.
80	21	"Goin' Down the Road: Part 1"	Graeme Campbell	Aaron Martin	February 7, 2005	August 19, 2005	421
Degrassi goes into chaos as Kevin Smith prepares to film the new Jay and Silent Bob movie there: Craig grows upset when Ashley prepares to go to London for the summer, and Caitlin begins spending a lot of time with Kevin and doubting her relationship with Joey. Note: This episode marks the final regular appearance of Melissa McIntyre. Special guest stars: Kevin Smith, Jason Mewes, and Alanis Morissette.
81	22	"Goin' Down the Road: Part 2"	Graeme Campbell	Aaron Martin	February 14, 2005	August 26, 2005	422
Off his bipolar medication and getting out of control, Craig disappears into the streets where he finds himself in trouble, and it is up to Joey to save him. Meanwhile, Joey attempts to save his relationship when Caitlin begins spending more time with Kevin. Special guest stars: Kevin Smith and Jason Mewes.

== DVD releases ==
The DVD release of season four was released by Alliance Atlantis Home Entertainment in Canada on 28 November 2006, and by FUNimation Entertainment in the US on 24 October 2006 after it had completed broadcast on television. It was released in Australia by Shock Records on 13 April 2011. As well as every episode from the season, the DVD release features bonus material including deleted scenes, bloopers and behind-the-scenes featurettes.

The final three episodes of the season were also released separately from the complete season release on 8 November 2005. They were packaged together in two different versions; one was dubbed "unrated, uncensored and uncut" and featured an audio commentary and other bonus material, the other was dubbed "rated", and did not feature the audio commentary.

The Complete Fourth Season
Set details			Special features
22 director's cut episodes; 4-disc set; 1.33:1 aspect ratio; Languages: English (Dolby Digital 5.1)			Audio commentaries: "Time Stands Still"; "Secret"; Deleted scenes; Blooper reel; Original cast auditions; Season 4 interactive quiz; Character and cast biographies; Jay and Silent Bob flipbook; Degrassi yearbook; PAX Gun Violence Prevention Public Service Announcements
Release dates			Audio commentaries: "Time Stands Still"; "Secret"; Deleted scenes; Blooper reel; Original cast auditions; Season 4 interactive quiz; Character and cast biographies; Jay and Silent Bob flipbook; Degrassi yearbook; PAX Gun Violence Prevention Public Service Announcements
Canada	United States	(Australia) Region 4	Audio commentaries: "Time Stands Still"; "Secret"; Deleted scenes; Blooper reel; Original cast auditions; Season 4 interactive quiz; Character and cast biographies; Jay and Silent Bob flipbook; Degrassi yearbook; PAX Gun Violence Prevention Public Service Announcements
28 November 2006	24 October 2006	13 April 2011	Audio commentaries: "Time Stands Still"; "Secret"; Deleted scenes; Blooper reel; Original cast auditions; Season 4 interactive quiz; Character and cast biographies; Jay and Silent Bob flipbook; Degrassi yearbook; PAX Gun Violence Prevention Public Service Announcements

Jay and Silent Bob Do Degrassi: The Next Generation (Director's Cut: Uncut, Uncensored and Unrated)
Set details	Special features
3 director's cut episodes; 120 minutes; 1-disc set; 1.78:1 aspect ratio; Languages: English (Dolby Digital 5.1)	Audio Commentaries: Five minutes of previously unseen integrated footage; Reel footage of the Canadian ninja scene; Bloopers; Deleted scenes; Jay and Silent Bob photo album; Degrassi photo album; Actor biographies; Character Profiles
Release date	Audio Commentaries: Five minutes of previously unseen integrated footage; Reel footage of the Canadian ninja scene; Bloopers; Deleted scenes; Jay and Silent Bob photo album; Degrassi photo album; Actor biographies; Character Profiles
United States	Audio Commentaries: Five minutes of previously unseen integrated footage; Reel footage of the Canadian ninja scene; Bloopers; Deleted scenes; Jay and Silent Bob photo album; Degrassi photo album; Actor biographies; Character Profiles
8 November 2005	Audio Commentaries: Five minutes of previously unseen integrated footage; Reel footage of the Canadian ninja scene; Bloopers; Deleted scenes; Jay and Silent Bob photo album; Degrassi photo album; Actor biographies; Character Profiles

Jay and Silent Bob Do Degrassi: The Next Generation (Director's Cut: Rated)
Set details	Special features
3 director's cut episodes; 100 minutes; 1-disc set; 1.78:1 aspect ratio; Languages: English (Dolby Digital 5.1)	Five minutes of previously unseen integrated footage; Reel footage of the Canadian ninja scene; Bloopers; Deleted scenes; Jay and Silent Bob photo album; Degrassi photo album; Actor biographies; Character Profiles
Release date	Five minutes of previously unseen integrated footage; Reel footage of the Canadian ninja scene; Bloopers; Deleted scenes; Jay and Silent Bob photo album; Degrassi photo album; Actor biographies; Character Profiles
United States	Five minutes of previously unseen integrated footage; Reel footage of the Canadian ninja scene; Bloopers; Deleted scenes; Jay and Silent Bob photo album; Degrassi photo album; Actor biographies; Character Profiles
8 November 2005	Five minutes of previously unseen integrated footage; Reel footage of the Canadian ninja scene; Bloopers; Deleted scenes; Jay and Silent Bob photo album; Degrassi photo album; Actor biographies; Character Profiles

== Notes ==
- Ellis, Kathryn (September 2005). Degrassi: Generations – The Official 411. New York, New York: Pocket Books. ISBN 978-1-4165-1680-4.
