= Out There with Melissa DiMarco =

Canadian syndicated television series

- Genre: Comedy, Parody, Celebrity Interviews
- Created by: Melissa DiMarco
- Starring: Melissa DiMarco
- Country of origin: Canada
- Original language: English
- No. of seasons: 8
- No. of episodes: 144

Production
- Executive producer: Melissa DiMarco
- Production locations: Toronto, Los Angeles, New York, Mexico, United Kingdom
- Running time: approx. 22 minutes
- Production company: Out There Productions Inc.

Original release
- Network: City National – Rogers Media Inc. (present); Global National (previous)
- Release: 2004 – present

Out There with Melissa DiMarco is an internationally distributed comedy series that parodies the entertainment industry and follows the misadventures of an entertainment journalist, and her offbeat "Out There" crew as they navigate the "glamorous" world of Hollywood. Canadian actress Melissa DiMarco (Degrassi: The Next Generation, Riverdale) portrays a neurotic entertainment journalist, struggling to keep her sanity while interviewing A-List stars.

== Content ==
The show follows DiMarco in her relentless quest to score celebrity interviews and red carpet exclusives, a quest that is constantly undermined by her eccentric production team, family, friends, and most of all, her own anxieties and neuroses. The show mixes a raw shooting style with narrative voiceover that present DiMarco's often quirky private thoughts. The fictionalized storylines parody typical celebrity journalism and are loosely based on DiMarco's true-life experiences as both an interviewer and an actor.

In every episode, the celebrities DiMarco interviews appear as themselves, often playing along with DiMarco's zany antics. Celebrity guests on Out There include Pierce Brosnan, George Clooney, Cameron Diaz, Colin Farrell, Salma Hayek, Queen Latifah, Ludacris, Matthew McConaughey, Brad Pitt, and Gene Simmons. Updates and excerpts from these interviews are syndicated internationally.

The show also prominently features events such as the Toronto International Film Festival, Canadian Music Week, and the Cannes Film Festival.

Episodes air on CHCH, Chek TV, E! Canada, Rogers, City's national network and OMNI.1, while excerpts from DiMarco's celebrity interviews air on OUTtv and in 1600 digital newspapers across North America.

== Awards/ Nominations ==
Out There was recognized for Outstanding Achievement in Creative Excellence at the 39th U.S. International Film and Video Festival in Los Angeles and nominated for two Rockie Awards and CCA Comedy Award for Best TV Comedy and Best TV Comedy Writing.
