= Time Stands Still (Degrassi: The Next Generation) =

- Degrassi: The Next Generation episodes
- A bullied Rick Murray getting revenge with his 1911 pistol trying to shoot Emma.
- Episode nos.: Season 4 Episodes 7 & 8
- Directed by: Stefan Scaini
- Production codes: 407 & 408
- Original air dates: 5 October 2004; 12 October 2004
- Running time: 44 minutes

Guest appearance
- Ephraim Ellis as Rick Murray

Episode chronology
← Previous "Islands in the Stream"	Next → "Back in Black"
- Degrassi: The Next Generation (season 4)

"Time Stands Still" is a two-part episode of the Canadian teen drama Degrassi: The Next Generation. It aired on CTV in Canada on 5 & 12 October 2004. In the two-part episode, Rick Murray (Ephraim Ellis), ostracized after he physically abused his girlfriend in the previous season, brings a gun to school and shoots and paralyzes Jimmy Brooks, when a prank pulled on Rick is blamed on Jimmy. Rick is then accidentally killed by Sean Cameron (Daniel Clark) in his attempt to stop the shooting. Despite being a two-part episode, many events were still unresolved until later in the season.

Part two of the episode earned director Stefan Scaini an award for "Outstanding Achievement in a Television Series – Family" at the Directors Guild of Canada Awards.

== Plot ==
=== Part one ===
A full year after his abuse sent his girlfriend Terri into a coma, Rick is still being bullied by the students of Degrassi, including Spinner, Jay, and Jimmy. Rick, however, has made friends with Toby and Emma, and develops a crush on the latter. He also becomes a contestant on the popular school trivia show "Whack Your Brain" with Toby and Emma.

Rick gets revenge on Spinner and Jay by spray painting an 'X' on the door of both of their cars. Spinner, Jay, Alex, and Sean meet up and discuss the incident. Spinner wants to tell Principal Raditch, though Sean reminds him that if they tell Raditch, he's going to want to know why Rick vandalized their cars. Spinner changes his mind, but assures his revenge on Rick.

Due to his intelligence, especially in sports, Jimmy is placed on the "Whack Your Brain" team by Archie after one of the contestants gets sick with mono. Both Jimmy and Rick detest Archie's decision, and Rick attempts to convince Raditch to get Jimmy off the team. Rick is quickly dismissed by Raditch, who claims Rick should try to make a better relationship with Jimmy. Rick is discouraged by this, but he and Jimmy soon start to get along.

Meanwhile, Joey, struggling with financial troubles, is attempting to sell his house, to Craig's dismay. When Joey's real-estate agent can't get the house sold, Craig decides to call Joey's ex-girlfriend, Sydney, who is an expertise in real estate. Though Joey is upset with Sydney's reappearance, Craig believes Sydney will sell the house for good money. During the open house, Caitlin comes back from Africa and asks why Sydney's name is on the lawn.

At the televised "Whack Your Brain" show, the Degrassi team is tied with Northern High School. For the final round, the team chooses Rick to go up. Rick ends up beating Northern, thus winning the game. While Rick celebrates his win on-stage, Spinner, Jay and Alex prank Rick by pouring a bucket of yellow paint and feathers on him in front of the audience. The audience laughs, humiliating Rick. Leaving school in shock, Rick is approached by Emma, who hands him the trophy and assures him he's the smartest guy in school; Rick kisses Emma. Emma is disgusted and angrily states she only befriended Rick because she felt pity for him. Dejected, Rick goes home and discovers his parents are not there. He pulls out a box from a drawer, opens it, and finds his father's gun.

=== Part two ===
Rick—now the laughing stock of the school—returns to Degrassi, still coated in feathers and paint, with his father's Colt 1911 concealed in a backpack. Planning to get revenge on his bullies, Rick goes after Paige first. When Paige encounters Rick, she reveals that she thought the prank was sickening and that she is sorry. Rick decides not to take out the gun to shoot her. He apologizes for hurting Terri and leaves.

While trying to clean himself up in the bathroom, Spinner and Jay trick Rick into thinking the prank was Jimmy's idea; Rick recommits to revenge. He approaches Jimmy, who is sympathetic towards him, informing him that he has his back if he is bullied further. Rick retorts to Jimmy that he was lying to him all along, and only pretending to be his friend; Jimmy is still unaware that Rick thought he set up the prank. Rick pulls out his gun and shoots Jimmy in the back, causing Jimmy to collapse to the floor. His unconscious body is seen by Craig.

Rick confronts Toby, Emma, and Sean in the hallway; Rick is mad at Emma for not reciprocating his feelings, stating that Emma played him, and that she has now "made his list". Sean tries to talk Rick out of shooting Emma, to no avail. When Rick points the gun at Emma, Sean attacks him and tries to point the gun away. They wrestle for the weapon and, during the struggle, it fires into Rick's stomach, killing him.

Following the incident, the school is put on a lockdown, though most of the students are unaware of what happened. In a classroom, Paige, Ellie, Ashley and Hazel learn about the shooting. Soon after, Hazel is pulled out of class and is informed that Jimmy was shot. Meanwhile, Caitlin and Joey, who were initially discussing about Sydney and the house, also learn about the shooting. They quickly arrive at Degrassi, where the students are being released from the school; Caitlin stops news reporters from interviewing the students. Archie yells at Raditch for not preventing Rick's bullying. Jay assures Alex that they will be fine and that nobody will find out, but Alex is regretful of her involvement. Spinner, filled with guilt and regret, tells Jay the authorities need to know who did it, and how they might have killed Jimmy. Jay reassures Spinner telling him "you need to shut up, ok?" and "we didn't do anything!" But Spinner retorts and says "We did!"

Toby and Emma leave the school and are greeted by their parents. Toby discovers that Rick has died. Numerous students, including Emma, Ashley, Sean, Ellie and Craig, watch the news about the shooting. Paige and Hazel go to the hospital to see Jimmy. Toby and Emma tearfully embrace at a candlelight vigil for Jimmy at Degrassi.

== Production ==
Executive producer Aaron Martin had wanted to address the issue of school shootings since the beginning of Degrassi: The Next Generation. In a 2004 interview, Martin expressed, "It wasn't an issue when the original Degrassi was on, and it's become much more of an issue in the last 10 years. And with any teen shows, there are only so many issues you can cover, and new ones are harder and harder to find."

The writers chose to bring back a character from the previous season to be involved in the storyline; Rick Murray, portrayed by Ephraim Ellis. In the previous season, Rick appeared as an abusive boyfriend to Terri MacGregor, played by Christina Schmidt, with the characters' relationship ending after Rick pushes Terri to the ground, causing her to hit her head on a cinderblock and putting her in a coma. Writer Brendan Yorke felt that Ellis as an actor "could pull off a very intense and demanding story-line" such as what had been planned, and thus it was a "no-brainer" to choose him to return. The producers enlisted bullying expert Barbara Coloroso, who worked with the families of survivors of the Columbine High School shooting, and who "gave us amazing insights into how [bullies] work and how this cycle of violence keeps happening over and over again."

Daniel Clark, who portrayed Sean Cameron, a major character in the episode, noted that the cast was not initially told of the issues that would be addressed that season, and that they had discovered the episode would involve school shootings at its table read. Director Stefan Scaini noted the atmosphere of the read-through: "Usually there would be a certain amount of energy and high-spirit, but the read-through got quieter and quieter and more serious as it went on. People were just looking down at their pages completely focused. I remember when we got to the point when Ephraim first pulls out the gun, everyone in the room was just breathless." He further added: "When they read the part where Aubrey gets shot in the back, some of the kids burst into tears. By the end of that read-through, you could hear a pin drop because everyone was so affected." Ellis and Scaini both noted that the atmosphere during the filming of the shooting scene was more serious than the "laid-back, fun, and light" atmosphere prevalent in the usual filming of the series.

Ellis noted that a real gun was used for the scene in which his character shoots Graham's. According to Scaini, the Emergency Task Force, as well as several gun wranglers and cast members, were tasked with verifying that the gun had no bullets, with Ellis instructed to hold the gun a certain way for the scene. A squib was used to simulate Jimmy Brooks' gunshot wound. Scaini noted that because the squib had an impact, Graham's lurch forward after his character was shot was legitimate.

Miriam McDonald, who portrayed Emma Nelson, noted in a contemporaneous interview that she and her co-stars were in a "state of shock" after reading the script. Stacey Farber, who played Ellie Nash, reflected on the episode in 2021, expressing that at the time, the episode "seemed really dramatic to me. Farfetched, even. It's astonishing and so horrific how that's changed. It was ahead of its time, sadly."

There were probably a lot of things going on behind the scenes that led up to us finally taking a crack at the school shooting story-lines. It was a topic we knew we would need to address at some point since, unfortunately, preparing for and dealing with school shootings are things a whole lot of students in the United States are forced to confront at some point. School shootings are vastly less routine in Canada, but your news travels north. The fundamental issues of bullying and violence are commonplace in Canada as well. By the fourth season a few things came together that we felt would facilitate the telling of a dramatic, yet balanced school shooting story. We had many of the young actors really hitting their strides in terms of being able to pull off what would be a very complicated and emotionally tough story-line.

— Degrassi: The Next Generation writer Brendon Yorke describing the idea for a school shooting episode in 2019

During the filming of the scene in which Jimmy Brooks was shot, police cruisers were stationed outside the school set with officers walking the halls with prop machine guns; Jake Epstein, who played Craig Manning, commented that it "felt very much like being a student at a school when you hear about something horrific and your friends are involved." Lauren Collins, who played Paige Michalchuk, noted that the cast was "in tears" after a special screening of the episode, and also commented: "I haven't seen that moment in probably 15 years, but I can hear [Jimmy] screaming out in the hallway." The N aired public service announcements to warn of the episode's content. The episode was named after the Rush song "Time Stand Still", in keeping with the show's trend of naming episodes after various 1980s songs. Yorke chose the name for the episode as he felt that it "conveyed the idea that one moment, when a horrible decision is made, can change lives forever."

== Broadcast ==
"Time Stands Still" first aired on CTV in Canada on 5 and 12 October 2004. It aired on the American cable channel Noggin during its programming block for teenagers, The N, on 3 and 10 December 2004 with a TV-PG-V rating.

== Reception and legacy ==
Degrassi co-creator Linda Schuyler ranked "Time Stands Still" fourth in an Entertainment Weekly interview discussing her favourite episodes in 2012. The A.V. Club listed the episode in their "10 Very special episodes" feature. Writer Pilot Viruet was critical of the episode, writing that "though some of the episode's intent (it's basically a "Why you shouldn't bully" PSA) is lost in the sheer absurdity of the situation—including Drake's less-than-impressive acting—the importance actually lies in what "Time Stands Still" sets up." In 2018, Ilana Caplan of The Independent listed "Time Stands Still" in her "7 Degrassi episodes you need to watch" feature.
