= Domenica (American band) =

- Origin: Los Angeles, California, USA
- Genres: Rock
- Years active: 2004–present
- Labels: C12 Records/EMI (Canada); Spinning Inc. (Japan); Rodeostar Records/SONY (Germany/Austria/Switzerland), Stock Xchange Music/SONY, (Australia)
- Members: Bekki Friesen
- Website: domenicamusic.com

Domenica refers to the music of songwriter/guitarist/vocalist Bekki Friesen. The Canadian band is based out of Los Angeles, California. Domenica can be classified as grunge/metal/pop, and is currently signed to C12 Records/EMI Canada, Spinning Inc in Japan, Rodeostar/Sony in Germany, Austria, and Switzerland, and Sony in Australia.

In 2010, Domenica played at Canadinns Stadium in Winnipeg, Canada for Rock on the Range.

== Discography ==
The first Domenica album, The Luxury, was produced by Brandon Friesen and features tracks co-written by Marcos Curiel of P.O.D., with guest appearances by Curiel, in addition to Ernie Longoria, and Stevie Salas.

A sophomore album entitled "The Better In Us All" was released in Japan October 10, 2012. This album features appearances by Dave Ellefson (Megadeth), Gil Sharone (Puscifer, Dillinger Escape Plan, Stolen Babies), and Dominic Cifarelli (Scars On Broadway).

== Television and film ==
In 2007, the track "I Love My Gun" was featured in the television series renegadepress.com. In 2008, Domenica performed live and interviewed on Episode 6 (Season 1) of Arbor Live, a national television show on APTN in Canada. Additionally, Bekki Friesen contributed vocals to "Give it All I've Got", the second main title song from the Center Stage 2: Turn It Up soundtrack. "What Goes Around" is featured in the movie soundtrack for Degrassi Takes Manhattan.

== Radio ==
Domenica's first single, "The Luxury", landed them a spot on Power 97 FM's Class of 200x compilation CD in 2006 as the first female-fronted band to accomplish this. Heavy airplay of the single followed on select Canadian radio stations.

Following the release of their debut studio album The Luxury in 2009, their single "Above Me" received heavy video and radio rotation in Canada and an equal amount of support across Japan. Their second single from this album, "What Goes Around", written by singer Bekki Friesen and Marcos Curiel (P.O.D) was chosen by Burrn! magazine's (Japan) editors as one of the top 10 hard rock/heavy metal songs of 2009. In the October 2010 issue of Burrn! magazine (Japan), Bekki Friesen is featured as a female rock guitarist to notice.
