= Degrassi Goes Hollywood =

- Written by: Sarah Glinski; Matt Huether; Vera Santamaria; Sara Snow
- Directed by: Stefan Brogren
- Music by: Music

Production
- Running time: 120 minutes
- Production companies: Epitome Pictures; CTV; The N Original; Echo Bridge Entertainment

Original release
- Network: The N
- Release: 14 August 2009
- Network: CTV
- Release: 30 August 2009

Degrassi Goes Hollywood, known in syndication as "Paradise City", is a 2009 Canadian television film based on the teen drama series Degrassi: The Next Generation, the fourth entry of the Degrassi television franchise. Directed by Stefan Brogren, it premiered in the United States on The N on 14 August 2009, and in Canada on CTV on 30 August 2009.

It is the first Degrassi: The Next Generation television movie, and the second in the franchise overall following School's Out (1992). It is the first mainline Degrassi production primarily filmed outside of Canada. In syndication, it was shown in four parts. An extended version of the film was released as a bonus on the show's season 8 DVD on 1 September 2009.

== Plot ==
Jason Mewes is the writer/director of Mewesical High, an upcoming musical about his high school relationship with his girlfriend Trixie. With the help of Kevin Smith, Mewes holds auditions for Trixie's role at the university of Manny and Emma. Unfortunately, Manny's audition tape is a disaster and she does not get a callback. Manny, encouraged by Kevin Smith to audition for the role again, decides to join a road trip to Los Angeles with Stüdz band members Sav, Peter, and Danny, led by Jay, who has borrowed a Degrassi school bus as travel. Mia rides along to spend time with her boyfriend Peter. Manny is still insecure about her acting and singing abilities due to her abusive relationship with her professor Mick, but she regains her confidence with Jay's help.

Meanwhile, in LA, Paige is working as a lowly assistant for reality show diva Hailey Montel. Hailey has Paige perform menial tasks such as taking care of her dog Truffles. Paige is recruited for the lead role by Mewesical High executive producer Robbie and furnished with a personal limousine and a gorgeous mansion. After vowing not to inherit Hailey's vain attitude, Paige quits her assistant job and invites Ellie and Marco from Toronto to celebrate with her. Ellie, trying to ignore the news that her father is returning from a military tour in Afghanistan, agrees to go to LA.

Filming is not going well with Paige as she frequently butts heads with Mewes on Trixie's character. Mewes wants to fire Paige, but Robbie demands she stays. Trying to get better acquainted with the Hollywood lifestyle, Paige seeks Hailey's advice. Hailey pushes Paige to improvise her lines and assert herself, alienating Marco and gaining a reputation as a diva among the Hollywood scene. Mewes is eventually fed up with Paige's antics and fires her. Manny is reinvigorated after getting the news of Paige's open position, but stalls to arrive after the gang's bus is stolen and broken down. Robbie, bluffing to keep Paige's job, threatens to fire Mewes, but Mewes suddenly quits, putting the musical in jeopardy.

Marco encourages Ellie to reach out to her family, but she lashes out and leaves to reconnect with a rehabilitated Craig, who is touring with Fall Out Boy. After spending a romantic day with him, Ellie is surprised to find Craig's girlfriend Yvette waiting at his apartment. Heartbroken and depressed, Ellie begins drinking heavily and nearly drowns herself at Venice Beach. Marco and Craig rescue her and convince her to visit her family in Canada. Ellie kisses Craig just before she says goodbye.

Paige is now a social pariah in Hollywood and will no longer get offers. Desperate to keep her fame, Paige conspires with Hailey to perform a salacious photo op. Marco confronts Paige for her lack of self-respect, causing Paige to slap him. Marco sadly leaves the mansion. Just as Manny and her friends make it to LA, she gets a call from Mewes explaining the movie's cancellation. Upset, they arrive to a local movie premiere, where Paige nearly second guesses the photo op. Manny recognizes Paige, causing the latter to trip and break her leg on the red carpet. Paige does Stüdz and Manny a favor by having them perform outside Mewes' window, guaranteeing them a spot in the musical.

Paige becomes Mewes' assistant, Ellie tearfully reunites with her father, and Manny and Jay promise to stay together after the movie finishes filming.

== Cast ==
- Raymond Ablack as Sav Bhandari, a guitarist in the Degrassi Community School rock band, Stüdz (seasons 7–11)
- Charlotte Arnold as Holly J. Sinclair, Degrassi student and employee at the Dot Grill (seasons 7–11)
- Mary Ashton as reality show star Hailey Montel, Paige's employer/peer
- Lauren Collins as Paige Michalchuk, Degrassi alumna, who lands the leading role in a Hollywood production, but clashes with the director, Jason Mewes (seasons 1–8)
- Nina Dobrev as Mia Jones, a student at Degrassi, single mother, and Peter's girlfriend (seasons 6–9)
- Jake Epstein as Craig Manning, an up-and-coming singer and songwriter who dropped out of Degrassi to pursue his musical career (seasons 2–8)
- Stacey Farber as Ellie Nash, a Degrassi alumna whose relationship with Craig becomes increasingly complicated when she meets him again in Los Angeles (seasons 2–8)
- Jamie Johnston as Peter Stone, a member of the Degrassi punk rock band, Stüdz (seasons 5–10)
- Kevin Jubinville as Principal Sheppard of Degrassi Community School, whom Jay Hogart coerces (by means not explained on screen) to loan or rent him a school bus in which to transport Manny and four minors (the Stüdz and Mia), across an international border and over 4,000 kilometres (2,500 mi) to Los Angeles
- Shane Kippel as Gavin "Spinner" Mason, Degrassi alumnus, manager of the Dot Grill, and customary drummer for Degrassi rock band Stüdz (though sidelined while his arm heals from a gunshot wound); he has previously dated both finalists for the female lead in Mewesical High: Manny & Paige (seasons 1–9)
- Dan Levy as Robbie, the studio producer who hires Paige for the role of Trixie
- Mike Lobel as Jay Hogart, the ex-fiancée of Manny Santos and replacement drummer for Stüdz following Spinner's injured arm from a gunshot wound (seasons 3–9)
- Miriam McDonald as Emma Nelson, Degrassi alumna who is Manny's best friend and roommate (seasons 1–9)
- Jason Mewes, as himself, is the writer-director and protagonist of Mewesical High, the film on which several of the characters work
- Adamo Ruggiero as Marco Del Rossi, Degrassi alumnus, and Paige's best friend and supporter (seasons 2–9)
- Michael Seater as Michael Ray, who plays Jason Mewes in Mewesical High
- Melinda Shankar as Alli Bhandari, Degrassi student and Sav's younger sister (seasons 8–14)
- Cassie Steele as Manny Santos, Degrassi alumna, who aspires to become a famous actress in Hollywood, and take over Paige's part in the movie (seasons 1–9)
- Evan Williams as Kelly Ashoona, the boyfriend and college roommate of Emma Nelson (seasons 8–9)
- Kelly Carlson, makes a cameo appearance as herself
- Vivica A. Fox makes a cameo appearance as herself
- Yani Gellman makes a cameo appearance in the film
- Perez Hilton makes a cameo appearance as himself in the film
- Cassadee Pope of pop-rock band Hey Monday makes a cameo appearance as herself as a colleague of Craig Manning
- Pete Wentz of rock band Fall Out Boy makes a cameo appearance as himself as a colleague of Craig Manning
- Kevin Smith, as himself, supports Jason Mewes as he makes his directorial debut

Former Degrassi: The Next Generation co-star, Shenae Grimes and her current series, 90210, are spoken of in dialogue by Hailey Montel (Mary Ashton) at a party, making Grimes the first Degrassi actor to exist within the Degrassi fictional universe independently of her character. Her Degrassi character, Darcy Edwards is neither seen nor referred to in Degrassi Goes Hollywood, and was said to be volunteering in Africa in a previous season. The line of dialogue, "Does 90210 have an After Show?" also refers to the Canadian series The After Show, which is co-hosted by Dan Levy who plays Robbie in the film. Also making an appearance is Romina D'Ugo, who appeared on the first season of So You Think You Can Dance Canada, as well as Janna Polzin, who was runner-up on How Do You Solve a Problem Like Maria? This was done again the following year with Degrassi Takes Manhattan, when The After Show's Jessi Cruickshank mentions Drake.

Stacey Farber earned a Gemini Award nomination for best performance in a children's or youth program or series, as Ellie Nash in "Paradise City (Part Three)". The award was won by Michael Seater (who also appeared in Degrassi Goes Hollywood) for his work on Life with Derek. He would then star beside Farber in 18 to Life.

== Production ==
Filming was split between Toronto and Hollywood with the majority being the former to keep production cost low. Adamo, Stacey, Lauren, Jake, and Jason all filmed in both locations while everyone else filmed only in Canada. All of the studio scenes were shot in Toronto during Degrassi's regular filming schedule while a lot of outdoor Los Angeles was filmed on location in less than a weeks time. Paige's mansion was filmed in both Canada and Los Angeles.

== Absences ==
The following characters do not appear in the movie, but were regular characters on the show during the previous season.

- Sarah Barrable-Tishauer as Liberty Van Zandt
- Stefan Brogren as Archie "Snake" Simpson
- Paula Brancati as Jane Vaughn
- Aislinn Paul as Clare Edwards

== Music ==
Degrassi Goes Hollywood: Music from the Original Movie

Soundtrack album by various artists
- Released: 4 August 2009
- Genre: Punk/Alternative Rock
- Length: 37:08 (CD); 44:17 (iTunes)
- Label: Sall Entertainment Group

Degrassi chronology
Music from Degrassi: The Next Generation	Degrassi Goes Hollywood: Music from the Original Movie	Degrassi Takes Manhattan: The Heat Is On

Degrassi Goes Hollywood: Music from the Original Movie is the title of the movie soundtrack released on CD on 4 August 2009, and digital download 25 August 2009. It features songs from little known Canadian artist as well as five original songs performed by cast members Cassie Steele and Jake Epstein. Some of the songs featured on it were previously used in the show, thus making this the eighth season soundtrack as well.

No.	Title	Artist	Length
1.	"Crash My Party"	Cassie Steele	3:03
2.	"Good Year"	Keith and Renee	3:22
3.	"My Fair Weather Friend"	The Blue Seeds	3:27
4.	"Rescue You"	Jake Epstein	4:46
5.	"Watch Out for the Fuzz"	Howie Beck	3:05
6.	"Life Is a Show"	Cassie Steele	4:12
7.	"All I Wanna Do"	The School	3:01
8.	"The Bee Hell"	The Two Minute Miracles	3:00
9.	"Swan Song"	Jake Epstein	1:46
10.	"Come On and Go"	Scout	3:59
11.	"I Just Wanna Party"	Stüdz	0:34
12.	"One Saturday Night Away"	Cassie Steele & The Mewesical High Cast	2:53

iTunes Store bonus tracks
No.	Title	Artist	Length
13.	"Crash My Party (Ralph Sall Remix)"	Cassie Steele	2:54
14.	"Life Is a Show (Ralph Sall Remix)"	Cassie Steele	4:15
