= Jajube Mandiela =

Canadian actress and director

- Born: July 25, 1988 (age 38); Toronto, Canada
- Education: University of Toronto
- Occupations: Actress, director
- Mother: Ahdri Zhina Mandiela

Jajube Mandiela (born July 25, 1988) is a Canadian actress and director. She is best known for portraying Chantay Black on Degrassi: The Next Generation.

== Early life ==
Mandiela was born on July 25, 1988, in Toronto, Ontario, Canada. Her mother is Jamaican theatre director Ahdri Zhina Mandiela. Mandiela graduated from the University of Toronto, studying the Innis College's Cinema Studies program.

== Career ==
Mandiela made her television debut in 2004 on the Canadian teen drama Degrassi: The Next Generation as Chantay Black. She appeared on season four through season eleven.

In 2007, she appeared in the Disney Channel Original Movie Jump In!, alongside Keke Palmer and Corbin Bleu.

Mandiela made her on stage debut in 2008, as Binti, a young girl growing up in modern day Malawi, in Binti's Journey. The production, based on Deborah Ellis' The Heaven Shop, was directed by her mother. It ran until March 2009.

In 2014, she starred in the play Wounded Soldiers as Lydia Grant. Her performance was met with praise by critics.

== Filmography ==
=== Film ===
Year	Title	Role	Notes
2012	Red Lights	Girl with Piercings	
2014	Bee & Julie-Julie	Bee	Short film
2017	Reel Women Seen	Actress	Short film
2018	Heart	Zoe	Short film
2019	Celeste and Moulee Till the End of the World	Kenzi	Short film
2019	Cheat Meal	Rita	Short film
2020	The Robbery	Alex	Short film

=== Television ===
Year	Title	Role	Notes
2004-2011	Degrassi: The Next Generation	Chantay Black	Main role (series 4-11)
2007	Jump In!	Yolanda Brooks	Television movie
2008	The Border	Akila Megembe	Episode: "Floral Tribute"
2010	Degrassi Takes Manhattan	Chantay Black	Television movie
2010	Degrassi in India	Self	Television movie
2011-2013	Crash Canyon	Pristine Manderbelt	Voice role; 26 episodes
2018	Frankie Drake Mysteries	Velma Peters	Episode: "Radio Daze"
2019	Murdoch Mysteries	Rose	Episode: "The Killing Dose"
2020	Star Trek: Discovery	Holo Officer #2	Episode: "Die Trying"

=== Web series ===
Year	Title	Role	Notes
2009-2010	Degrassi: Minis	Chantay Black	14 episodes

== Filmmaking credits ==
Year	Title	Producer	Director	Writer	Notes
2014	Bee & Julie-Julie	Yes	Yes	No	Short film
2018	Heart	Yes	No	Yes	Short film
2019	Cheat Meal	Yes	No	No	Short film
TBA	First Grade Headache	Yes	Yes	No	Short film

== On stage ==
=== As performer ===
Year	Title	Role	Director	Venue	Notes	Ref.
2008-2009	Binti's Journey	Binti	Ahdri Zhina Mandiela	Tarragon Theatre		
2009	The Centre	Q-Spy	Joan Kivanda	Factory Theatre		
2009	Greenland	Tanya	Ravi Jain	Bob Nasmith Innovation Backspace	Summerworks Festival	
2010	Sia	Sia Wonleh	Philip McKee	St. Vladimir's Theatre		
2011	Swoon!	Emma	Jason Maghanoy	Factory Theatre		
2011	Morning Glory	Stefanie	Kate Lushington	Bob Nasmith Innovation Backspace		
2012	Sia	Sia Wonleh	Nina Lee Aquino	Factory Theatre		
2013	Nobody's Idol	Frances / Annie	Ramona Gillmour-Darling	Randolph Theatre		
2014	Wounded Soldiers	Lydia Grant	Robert Winslow	Winslow Farm		

=== As production ===
Year	Title	Venue	Director	Assistant director	Notes	Ref.
2010	All of Him	Bob Nasmith Innovation Backspace	Yes	No		
2012	Tick	George Ignatieff Theatre	Yes	No		
2012	Obeah Opera	918 Bathurst Centre for Culture	No	Yes		
2013	Sister Mary's a Dyke?!	Aki Studio	No	Yes		
2014	The Art of Storytelling	Honest Ed's Alleyway	Yes	No		
2016	Salt-Water Moon	Factory Theatre	No	Yes		
