= Crash Canyon =

2011 Canadian animated sitcom

- Genre: Adult animation; Animated sitcom
- Created by: Jamie LeClaire; Phil LaFrance; Kyle MacDougall
- Developed by: Joel H. Cohen
- Directed by: Greg Lawrence
- Voices of: Patrick McKenna; Jennifer Irwin; Bryn McAuley; Joanne Vannicola; Dwayne Hill; Shoshana Sperling; Gil Anderson; Tarah Consoli; Martin Roach; Marium Carvell; Jajube Mandiela; Anand Rajaram; Teresa Pavlinek; Tara Strong; Peter Keleghan
- Opening theme: "Crash Canyon!"
- Ending theme: "Crash Canyon!" (instrumental)
- Composer: Jeff Morrow
- Country of origin: Canada
- Original language: English
- No. of seasons: 2
- No. of episodes: 26

Production
- Executive producers: Joan Lambur; Ira Levy
- Producer: Greg Lawrence
- Editors: Tom Berger; Kirk Hudson
- Running time: 22 minutes
- Production companies: Breakthrough Entertainment; Jam Filled Entertainment; Elliott Animation

Original release
- Network: Teletoon at Night; MTV; MAVTV
- Release: September 18, 2011 – March 3, 2013

Related
- Family Guy; The Simpsons; American Dad! Futurama

Crash Canyon is a Canadian adult animated sitcom created by Jamie LeClaire, Phil Lafrance and Kyle MacDougall for Teletoon's late-night block Teletoon at Night and was distributed worldwide by MTV. The series is about a family who drives off a cliff and falls into the canyon after driving to their vacation. The series premiered on September 18, 2011 until its final episode aired on March 3, 2013.

Crash Canyon was produced by Breakthrough Entertainment and Jam Filled Entertainment in association with Elliott Animation. 26 episodes were produced.

== Plot ==
The Wendell family was looking for an original holiday by caravan, but their trip ends sooner than expected when they crash into a canyon in Alberta, Canada, which they cannot escape from. Soon they find out there is a whole community of 29 or 30 survivors from previous crashes down there. Dollars are not accepted and they use golf tees as a currency.

== Development ==
Crash Canyon premiered on September 18, 2011. Joel Cohen, a Canadian expatriate living in Los Angeles while writing for The Simpsons, explained that creating an animated Canadian show with fellow expatriates would allow to write "jokes only hosers would get". He recruited ex-Canadian writers Tim Long of The Simpsons and Chuck Tatham of How I Met Your Mother to write scripts for the series. Co-producer and story editor Greg Lawrence explained that they have tried not to put too much emphasis on the family trying to escape the canyon. "It's not Gilligan's Island where every episode is: 'This week we're getting off the island.' But we do keep the sentiment alive, so as you move through the series there are attempts to get out and all fail."

=== Cancellation ===
On June 6, 2013, Teletoon released a press statement to Bubbleblabber stating that the network would not be moving forward with a 3rd season of the series. "Unfortunately a 3rd season of Crash Canyon is not in our plans at this time." The show ended on March 3, 2013.

== Characters ==
=== Wendells ===
- Norman "Norm" Wendell (voiced by Patrick McKenna): An extremely rational engineer, he never loses his temper and is arguably the sanest person in the canyon. He has little social skills and often tries to solve his problems with science, only to fail. He is the head of the family.
- Sheila Wendell (voiced by Jennifer Irwin): Norm's wife, who is easily enraged but also very loving and caring. She openly hates Vernon, Beverly and Angel.
- Roxanne "Roxy" Wendell (voiced by Bryn McAuley): An extremely self-centered, selfish, impatient and constantly shallow teenage daughter. She complains about being stuck in the canyon. She does show occasional love for her family, but this is rare.
- Jacob "Jake" Wendell (voiced by Jo Vannicola): A 10-year-old scam artist and the family's son, who is obsessed with making money through scams, gambling and fraud. He respects his father more than his sister does and is often seen along with Sid's children Sly and Butch.
- Vernon "Vern" Wendell (voiced by Patrick McKenna): An enormously overweight alcoholic who rides around on a mobility scooter. He lives in the family's van, and is mean, ill-tempered and stupid, making him one of the least-liked inhabitants of the canyon. He is Norm's third cousin.

=== Butanes ===
Note: The entire hillbilly family speaks grammatical false English, and writes letters in false direction. Also, every one of them is very dimwitted, bordering on mental retardation.

- Sid (voiced by Dwayne Hill): Former British punk rocker. His main hit was a song called "I Wanna Punch A Rainbow", which can be heard in some episodes. He and his family ended up in the canyon after a plane crash.
- Emily (voiced by Jo Vannicola): Sid's wife. She is dimwitted, like the rest of her family, but seems to be more responsible to her children than her husband. She thinks French-talking men are very romantic.
- Mace (voiced by Shoshana Sperling): The family's love-sick teenage daughter. She desperately looks for a boyfriend (even going so far as to date animals or create one in her mind). She is friends with Roxy and Pristine, but only Roxy can hold the three together.
- Sly (voiced by Gil Anderson) and Butch (voiced by Tarah Consoli): Perverse younger sons of the family. They have bad teeth and are extremely stupid, often endangering their lives because of it. They are friends (or rather, sidekicks) of Jake. They also seem to have an incestuous crush on their sister and each other; however, this can come from their dumbness.

=== Manderbelts ===
- Reginald (voiced by Martin Roach): Owner of Manderbelt Industries, husband of Beverly and father to Royce, Pristine and Vaughn. He is an arrogant, selfish and snobbish man who often boasts about his wealth. He and his family wanted to move with their home (literally), but ended up in the canyon.
- Beverly (voiced by Marium Carvell): The snobby matron of the family. She is as arrogant as her husband, and sometimes even more. She has a creepy crush on her son Royce, and she even bathes him.
  - Bjorn: The family's Norwegian servant, who never speaks. He has a very muscular build, and he does everything the family tell him to do, irrelevant of how bad or immoral it is.
  - Princess: The family's 2-legged, disabled cat.
- Royce (voiced by Dwayne Hill): The family's oldest son. Very handsome, he is Roxy's love interest until the 2nd season. Though not quite as nice as Pristine, Royce is somewhat affable by nature.
- Pristine (voiced by Jajube Mandiela): The family's middle child and only daughter who is also a friend of Roxy. Unlike her parents, Pristine is much less snobby and arrogant and rather kind and friendly towards the other inhabitants, causing her to be regarded as ugly by the rest of her family, in spite of her actual prettiness.
- Vaughn: Youngest son and undefeated antagonist, he has anger issues. He does not say much aside from saying "I'm Vaughn". His parents do nothing to stop his aggressive behavior or discipline him.

=== Charbonneaus ===
- Angel (voiced by Teresa Pavlinek): A mother-daughter team who tours the junior beauty pageant circuit. They, like the Manderbelts, are very arrogant, and sometimes even more. Despite the fact that Angel is manipulating and mischievous, she loves her daughter dearly and is very maternal towards her.
- Brandi (voiced by Tara Strong): A ruthless girl who is very spoiled and unlike Roxy, she only cares about herself.
  - Stéphane (voiced by Peter Keleghan): The gay coach for Brandi's modelling. He acts like a stereotypical arrogant French man.

=== Other characters ===
- Sarah Forbes (voiced by Shoshana Sperling): A cheerleader who is always happy and never seems to lose her nerves. She is also the mayor of Crash Canyon and runs its school.
- Nalappat Brajabashimayum (voiced by Anand Rajaram): An Indian-Canadian ventriloquist who treats his dummy like a living being. He runs the only bar in the canyon, serving a strange drink that he made himself.
- Frida Dominguez (voiced by Shoshana Sperling): A Latin-Canadian lady who runs into a restaurant with low hygiene standards. She is a very sexually active person and has an affair with Bjorn.
- Colton Steel and Private Lippy (voiced by Dwayne Hill): A pair of astronauts who ended up in the canyon when their capsule landed there after re-entry. Colton is a very patriotic astronaut, while Lippy is a monkey who has a crush on Roxy. They both are best friends. He is the only one in the canyon with a US nationality.
- Earl: A biker thug who is very violent, but can be humorous sometimes, and she ended up in the canyon after a friend from his group punched him. He has a large beard and red hair.
- Hiko: An elderly Japanese-Canadian man who talks like a stereotypical, fast-talking Asian. Most people in the canyon seem to never get that he is Japanese, as many believe him to be Chinese, Taiwanese or of other Asian descent, which angers him.
- Mrs. Mcgurck and Bear: An abusive old woman who throws her insults and tortures at a brown bear (who she believes ate her husband) and treats him like a slave.
- Pete and Carol: (voiced by Dwayne Hill and Shoshana Sperling): Ambulance attendants, most of the time they act very amoral and irresponsible for their occupation and make many jokes. They ended up in the canyon after Pete let go of the wheel and they went off the road.
- Coma Steve (voiced by Patrick McKenna): Pete and Carol's patient that they primarily treat as an object. It is shown that Coma Steve is still aware of what happens around him. He can occasionally comment on it, but is unable to move. Before he fell into the canyon he had a perfect life (he was engaged, about to become a father, and won 50 million dollars), but while trying to save a kitten he dislocated his arm. When Pete and Carol drove him to the hospital, Pete got off of the road, falling into the canyon, causing Steve to fall into a coma.

=== One-time characters ===
- Russel Mcgurck: Husband to the aforementioned widow as he appears in "Moose on the Loose". She turns out that he and his wife ended up in the Canyon after he attempted to suicide because of the constant insults of his wife. When he wanted to eat some honey, he took off his clothes because they were full of it. Once he came back, the bear was chewing on his clothes. Russel took the chance to go into the woods and live there, but he is later found by Norm and Jake. After a failed moose hunt, the moose kicks him from a cliff, and they believe that he is dead; at the end of the episode, however, it turns out that he is still alive and hiding from his wife. It is unclear if he would join the other Canyonites if they ever find a way to escape.
- Cannonball Harris: As he never actually appears in the series, Colton mentions him in the pilot episode. When trying to shoot himself out of the Canyon, he crashed on one of the canyon's walls and died. Due to this character, the fact that Sarah lives in a school bus and the presence of more vehicles than Canyonites, it is hinted that there were far more people who fell into the canyon, but they got lost or died.
- Bobby Joe (voiced by Patrick McKenna): Bobby Joe was a man. She had a very bad life until he met the girl of his dreams Cathy, until he caught her cheating on him with a deceased man. Bobby Joe then had sex with a diseased primate, and caught the fatal Rametse virus, he then tried committing suicide by jumping into the canyon, right after coming together as a community, the Canyonites throw Bobby Joe a proper funeral after he finally succumbs to death and is raped to death by Bear.
- Robin Banks: A bank robber in the 1800s, who hid in the canyon along with his two accomplices (a monkey and a donkey). He sealed off the canyon with an impenetrable door that could only be opened with a donkey hoof and a monkeys paw. Unfortunately, Banks never made it back out of the canyon as his leg got stuck in a fire ant hill, and his other leg was eaten by a python. He left his diaries behind in case someone else ever ended up in the canyon.

== Episodes ==
The show consists of two seasons, with the first season consisting of 18 episodes and the second season consisting of 8 episodes. The episode order of the show as aired on Teletoon in Canada differs from that of airings in other countries.

=== Season 1 (2011–12) ===
Canadian No.	International No.	Title	Original release date
1	1	"Pilot"	September 18, 2011
2	9	"Poker Night"	September 25, 2011
3	8	"The Out-of-Pantsers"	October 2, 2011
4	18	"Sid Our Savior"	October 9, 2011
5	6	"Moose on the Loose"	October 16, 2011
6	11	"The Big Picture"	October 23, 2011
7	15	"The Tees That Bind"	November 6, 2011
8	17	"Jake's First Kiss"	November 13, 2011
9	13	"Hex Marks the Spot"	November 20, 2011
10	14	"Ultimate Wedding Chicken"	November 27, 2011
11	4	"Confidence Builder"	February 5, 2012
12	19	"Vernon Loves Carol and Cake"	February 12, 2012
13	25	"The Wrath of Vaughn"	February 19, 2012
14	21	"Station WNDL"	September 7, 2012
15	20	"For Norm the Sell Tolls"	September 14, 2012
16	7	"Risky Monkey Business"	September 21, 2012
17	24	"A Bun in the Canyon"	September 28, 2012
18	2	"Heavyweight Vamp"	October 5, 2012

=== Season 2 (2013) ===
Canadian No.	International No.	Title	Original release date
19	16	"The Curse of the Monkey"	January 13, 2013
20	12	"Mr. Crash Canyon"	January 20, 2013
21	26	"Less Than 127 Hours (For the Love of God Die Already)"	January 27, 2013
22	5	"Chillaxin' Chutney"	February 3, 2013
23	3	"Sheila Could Use a Nap"	February 10, 2013
24	22	"Over-flubbed"	February 17, 2013
25	10	"He's the Mayor"	February 24, 2013
26	23	"Trash Canyon"	March 3, 2013

== Telecast and home media ==
Crash Canyon first premiered on Teletoon's Teletoon at Night in Canada on September 18, 2011 and ended on March 3, 2013. Viacom's MTV distributed the series worldwide. The series aired on MAVTV in the United States.

The series is currently available on Tubi, The Roku Channel and Amazon Prime Video. It was previously available on Crackle. The entire series became available on Breakthrough Entertainment (now Shadow Pine Studios)'s YouTube channel in mid-2020.
