= Alanna Clarke =

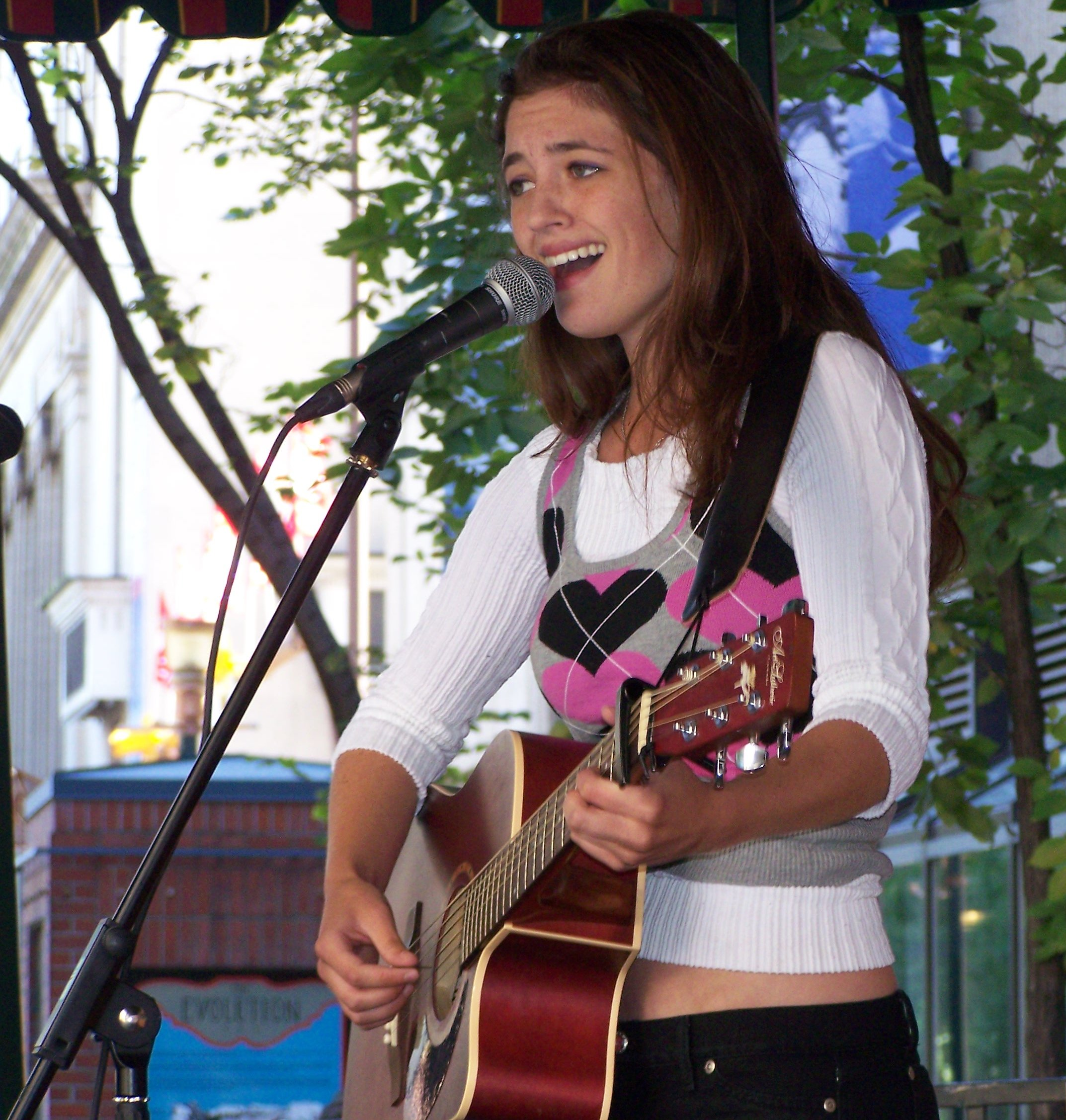
- Alanna Clarke performing along Stephen Avenue in Downtown Calgary on August 28, 2008

Background information
- Origin: Cochrane, Alberta, Canada
- Genres: pop/rock
- Occupation: singer
- Instruments: guitar, piano
- Label: unsigned
- Website: AlannaClarke.com

Alanna Clarke is a Canadian singer/songwriter, guitarist, and piano player based in Cochrane, Alberta.

== Early life ==
Clarke grew up near Cochrane, and attended Cochrane High School.

== Career ==
Clarke won the Calgary Breakfast Television Spotlight. She was winner of the Toast 'n Jam Battle of the Bands 2007 held at Canada Olympic Park. Her first demo CD, titled Kissing Booth, was released in 2006. She won the Don Weldon Award for most promising performer at the Calgary Stampede Talent Search in 2008. In the Cochrane Youth Talent Festival she won two years in row. Her third CD, Wild Rose, was released in 2010, and one of her songs was selected for use in the movie, Degrassi Takes Manhattan.

On August 11, 2011, Clarke performed in Toronto's annual all-female, multi-genre artist Honey Jam showcase presented by PhemPhat in Toronto, Ontario, Canada.

On November 12, 2014, Alanna premiered a new single Heartstrings (Produced by Mike 'WUFF' Wofford, Vocal Produced by Jon E.K. and Mixed by Adrian Bradford) on the Los Angeles blog Free Bike Valet.
