= Ahdri Zhina Mandiela =

Canadian-Jamaican poet (born 1953)

- Born: May 10, 1953 (age 73)
- Occupations: Theatre director, producer
- Children: Jajube Mandiela

Ahdri Zhina Mandiela (born May 10, 1953) is a Canadian dub poet, theatre producer and artistic director, based Toronto. She has gained worldwide acclaim for her books, music recordings, film, theatre and dance productions. Mandiela is the founder and artistic director of "b current", a not-for-profit performance arts company in Toronto.

In 2006, she was selected to write and direct a project for Winnie Mandela as part of the 50th anniversary of the South African Women's Liberation Movement.

Over the following decades, mandiela continued to develop her practice as a director, mentor, and performer, nurturing generations of artists through b current and advancing the presence of Black women’s voices in Canadian theatre. In 2025, she returned to the screen in the title role of Aunt Harriet: An Ontario Oratorio, an audiovisual installation directed by mixed-media artist HAUI. The work reimagines the final day of Harriet Miller, a nineteenth-century Black elder from southern Ontario, through poetry and performance. Mandiela’s portrayal merges her long-standing interest in dub poetics, ancestral memory, and oral tradition.

== Personal life ==
Mandiela's daughter is actress and director Jajube Mandiela.

== Works ==
=== Books and music ===
- Speshal Rikwes [Poems in Dialect] (p. 1985)
- Dark Diaspora... in Dub (p. 1991)
- step into my head (1995)

=== Theatre ===
- A Midsummer Night's Dream with "a contemporary, urban interpretation with a Caribbean twist." (2007)
- "Who Knew Grannie: A Dub Aria" (2010)

=== Film ===
- on/black/stage/women a documentary covering 30 years of contributions made by Black women to Toronto's theatre scene.
- Upcoming audiovisual work Aunt Harriet, directed and devise by mixed media artist HAUI released in 2025

== Awards ==
- 2006 The Silver Ticket Award, for Outstanding Contribution to the Development of Canadian Theatre
- Victor Martyn Lynch-Staunton Award – Theatre (2007)
- 2025 Gascon-Thomas Award for Lifetime Achievement

== See also ==
- Postcolonial feminism
