= Degrassi Takes Manhattan =

2010 Canadian television film

- Written by: Kate Miles Melville; Duana Taha; Michael Grassi; Emily Andras
- Directed by: Stefan Brogren
- Music by: Music

Production
- Producers: David Lowe; Brendon Yorke
- Cinematography: Jim Westenbrink
- Editor: D. Gillian Truster
- Running time: 120 minutes
- Production companies: Epitome Pictures; Echo Bridge Entertainment

Original release
- Network: MuchMusic
- Release: 16 July 2010

Degrassi Takes Manhattan, titled "The Rest of My Life" in syndication, is a 2010 Canadian television film based on the teen drama television series Degrassi: The Next Generation, the fourth entry of the Degrassi television franchise, which by release was renamed simply Degrassi. Directed by Stefan Brogren, it premiered in Canada on MuchMusic on 16 July 2010 and in the United States on TeenNick on 19 July 2010.

It is the second feature-length movie of the Next Generation cast, and the third feature-length film in the franchise overall, following School's Out (1992) and Degrassi Goes Hollywood (2009). In syndication, it was shown in four parts.

This movie brought TeenNick its highest ratings ever, the most watched telecast on the network, and the most watched telecast by teens on the evening of 19 July. An extended version of the film was released as a bonus on the show's season 9 DVD on 20 July 2010. The special acted as somewhat of a de facto series finale for The Next Generation.

== Plot ==
The members of Janie & the Studz featuring Peter Stone make their way to the front of Degrassi Community School as the last minutes of the school year tick down. Knowing that Spinner and Jane want to spend more time together in the summer, Spinner hires Emma as a new server, giving her instructions not to use the sandwich grill until she is fully oriented. With The Dot now employed, Spinner and Jane head to the Coynes’s pool party. While Holly J. and Jane are in the dressing tent, and are unaware that Spinner is within earshot, overhearing, they talk about the time Jane cheated on Spinner with Holly J.'s boyfriend, Declan. This new information, along with Jane leaving the country to go to Stanford University, causes Spinner to break up with Jane in a big scene. Upon returning to The Dot, Spinner finds it on fire, a result of Emma’s having used the short-circuiting sandwich grill. This causes Spinner to fall into an even deeper depression, where he violently removes all Jane memorabilia from his loft.

With nothing to do for the summer for Jane, she gets invited to live in the penthouse suite in Manhattan with Holly J., Declan, and his sister Fiona. After being a third wheel to Declan and Holly J., Jane continues to explore New York, and gets invited to front an indie band, Flashin' Midnight, which will be playing on TVM, the music channel where Holly J. is about to start her internship. On Holly J.'s first day, she runs into Jay Manuel, who gives her a warning about her new boss, Kristin (MTV Canada host Jessi Cruickshank). Holly J. also finds out that Fiona will be interning there, as a result of her jealousy to Holly J.'s time with Declan. A feud breaks out between Holly J. and Fiona, attempting to hurt each other emotionally. Holly J. locks Fiona in a room before a live broadcast, and Fiona attempts to get Declan on her side. She plans a party in their penthouse, to show Holly J. Declan's ex-girlfriends, but when this does not affect Holly J., she proceeds to kiss her brother Declan to make a scene. This causes Declan to side with his seemingly crazy sister and Holly J. running out for the night. The following morning, he talks to Holly J., winning her back, and asks Fiona to move out.

Meanwhile, Jane grows closer to Flashin' Midnight's lead George, and is encouraged to skip attending college in the fall to join the band. While she is excited for the opportunity, she thinks she is moving too fast and hesitates to give a clear answer. Jane is heartbroken to later find the band rehearsing with their previous singer, George's ex, Siobhan. Jane calls Spinner out of grief.

In an attempt to cheer Spinner up, Emma, Manny, and Jay "kidnap" him, and take him to a casino hotel at Niagara Falls. After some successful games of blackjack, Emma and Spinner get drunk, and wake up in the same bed the following morning, not remembering what had happened. They find out that they spent their winnings on a legal marriage, and an ugly, unreturnable ring. In the following days they become closer to each other, and begin to rethink getting a divorce. When Spinner tells Jane that they will hold a ceremony that Saturday, Jane realizes that she still has feelings for him, and convinces Holly J. and Declan to drive her back to Toronto. When Spinner and Emma start to question their marriage, they agree to wait to see if it works. They each go back to their friends, retelling the conversation in their head, until they realize that they do love each other. Spinner runs to the Simpson/Nelson house to profess his love for Emma, just as Snake and Spike have returned home from their vacation. Everyone decides to hold the wedding ceremony.

Not wanting Jane to stop the wedding, Holly J. and Declan try to stall the road trip, until Jane steals their car. She reaches the lake side party before the ceremony is about to begin, and finds Spinner's tent. After a brief fight with Manny, who thinks Jane is sabotaging the wedding, Jane finally realizes that Spinner is in love with Emma, and allows the wedding to continue. Spinner and Emma are officially married and Jane is excited for what her future holds.

== Cast ==
- Raymond Ablack as Sav Bhandari
- Dalmar Abuzeid as Danny Van Zandt
- Charlotte Arnold as Holly Jeanette "Holly J." Sinclair
- Sarah Barrable-Tishauer as Liberty Van Zandt
- Paula Brancati as Jane Vaughn
- Stefan Brogren as Archie "Snake" Simpson
- Annie Clark as Fiona Coyne
- Robin Craig as Mrs. Mason
- Jessi Cruickshank as Kristin
- Anna Cyzon as Siobhan
- Melissa DiMarco as Daphne Hatzilakos
- Kenny Hotz as a record salesman
- Suresh John as Gamal
- Jamie Johnston as Peter Stone
- Shane Kippel as Gavin "Spinner" Mason
- Tyler Kyte as himself
- Landon Liboiron as Declan Coyne
- Mike Lobel as Jay Hogart
- Elaine Lui as Lainey
- Jajube Mandiela as Chantay Black
- Jay Manuel as himself
- Forbes March as George
- Miriam McDonald as Emma Nelson
- Colin Mochrie as Larry, a divorce lawyer
- R. O. Glasgow as Dealer
- Doug Morency
- Mary Murphy as a sales clerk
- Scott Paterson as Johnny DiMarco
- Aislinn Paul as Clare Edwards
- Melinda Shankar as Alli Bhandari
- Cassie Steele as Manny Santos
- Amanda Stepto as Christine "Spike" Nelson
- Joy Tanner as Mrs. Coyne
- Jessica Tyler as Jenna Middleton
- uncredited, Liberty's date, a Toby Isaacs look-alike

Former Degrassi: The Next Generation co-star Aubrey Graham is spoken of in dialogue – under his stage name Drake – by Kristin (Jessi Cruickshank) during her first appearance, making Drake the second Degrassi actor to exist within the Degrassi fictional universe independently of his character. His character, Jimmy Brooks, is neither seen nor referred to in Degrassi Takes Manhattan, and was last seen in season 8. The first actor to do this was Shenae Grimes in Degrassi Goes Hollywood.

Jessi Cruickshank, who plays Holly J's boss Kristin, is the second The After Show host to appear in a Degrassi movie. Her After Show co-host Dan Levy co-starred in Degrassi Goes Hollywood as Paige's boss Robbie, a film producer.

== Absences ==
The following characters do not appear in the movie, but were regular characters on the show during the previous season.

- Sam Earle as K.C. Guthrie
- Argiris Karras as Riley Stavros
- Jordan Hudyma as Blue Chessex
- Judy Jiao as Leia Chang
- Samantha Munro as Anya MacPherson
- A.J. Saudin as Connor Deslauriers
- Natty Zavitz as Bruce the Moose

== Production ==
Degrassi Takes Manhattan was filmed in Toronto and in New York City.

== Music ==
Degrassi Takes Manhattan: The Heat Is On (Music from the Original Movie)

Soundtrack album by various artists
- Released: 13 July 2010
- Genre: Punk/Alternative Rock
- Length: 40:52 (CD); 57:43 (iTunes)
- Label: Sall Entertainment Group / Fontana North

Degrassi chronology
Degrassi Goes Hollywood: Music from the Original Movie	Degrassi Takes Manhattan: The Heat Is On (Music from the Original Movie)

Degrassi Takes Manhattan: The Heat Is On (Music from the Original Movie) is the title of the movie soundtrack released by digital download on 13 July 2010, and CD on 20 July 2010. It features songs from Canadian indie bands, the Finnish band Automatic Eye, as well as original songs performed by cast members.

Robert Fletcher, Mike Baskervillem, John Dykstra, Danielle McBride, Dan Sexton, and Virginia Storey, collectively received a Gemini Award nomination for best sound in a dramatic program, for their work in Degrassi Takes Manhattan, but lost to The Pillars of the Earth.

No.	Title	Artist	Length
1.	"The Great Escape"	The Studs & Paula Brancati feat. Peter Stone	3:57
2.	"Maybe Love"	Flashin' Midnight & Paula Brancati	2:30
3.	"I Trust You"	The Studs & Cassie Steele	2:59
4.	"Here Today"	Flashin' Midnight & Paula Brancati	4:18
5.	"Away From Sunshine"	Automatic Eye	3:33
6.	"Fly Away"	Honey Ryder	4:20
7.	"Good Life"	Michelle Featherstone	2:55
8.	"N.Y.M."	The Damn Automatics	2:46
9.	"What Goes Around"	Domenica	2:46
10.	"Got to Be"	Latch Key Kid	3:06
11.	"Fine Line"	Alanna Clarke	3:38
12.	"Put Me on Your Playlist"	Confection	3:21

iTunes Store bonus tracks
No.	Title	Artist	Length
13.	"The Great Escape (The Ralph Sall remix)"	The Studs & Paula Brancati feat. Peter Stone	3:54
14.	"Here Today (The Ralph Sall remix)"	Flashin' Midnight & Paula Brancati	4:06
15.	"Maybe Love (The Ralph Sall remix)"	Flashin' Midnight & Paula Brancati	4:49
16.	"I Trust You (The Ralph Sall remix)"	The Studs & Cassie Steele	4:02
