= Riverdale (Canadian TV series) =

Canadian primetime soap opera

- Created by: Yan Moore
- Country of origin: Canada
- Original language: English
- No. of seasons: 3
- No. of episodes: 94

Production
- Producers: Stephen Stohn; Linda Schuyler
- Running time: 30 minutes
- Production company: Epitome Pictures

Original release
- Network: CBC Television
- Release: 1997 – 2000

Riverdale is a Canadian prime time television soap opera that ran for three seasons from 1997 to 2000. The series was set in the Toronto community of Riverdale, focusing on a variety of characters and their interactions in everyday life.

Riverdale was produced by Epitome Pictures in association with CBC Television. Originally inspired by the socially realistic style of British soaps such as Coronation Street, due to low early ratings it began introducing some more American-style soap opera elements, most notably in the expansion of Melissa DiMarco's character, Irene Stavros, into an American-style soap vixen who dressed in tight clothing to accentuate her sex appeal.

Cast member Marion Gilsenan was suffering from cancer for much of her stint on the series. She won a Gemini Award for Best Supporting Actress in a Drama Program or Series at the 14th Gemini Awards in 1999, several months after her death.

The series typically attracted low ratings in its initial prime-time airing, but performed more strongly on Sundays after a daytime repeat was added following Coronation Street. 94 half-hour episodes were produced.

== Cast ==
- Chris Benson as Wally Wowczuk
- Christian Potenza as Jimmy Snow
- Maurice Long as Dave Nichols
- Christopher Shyer and Hamish McEwan as Ben MacKenzie
- Marion Gilsenan as Joan MacKenzie
- Martin Roach as Jerome "Tiny" Sheffield
- Paul Soles as Costas Stavros
- Maria Ricossa as Chrisa Stavros
- Alex Campbell as Patrick MacKenzie
- Stewart Arnott as Charles MacKenzie
- Lynne Griffin as Alice Sweeney
- Hugo Dann as George Pattillo
- Merwin Mondesir as Gordo Johnson
- Ken James as Stan Wilkes
- Jayne Eastwood as Gloria Wilkes
- Yanna McIntosh as Jenni Hernandez
- Tyrone Benskin as Mike Hayes
- Tom Melissis as Jake Rose
- Ashley Brown as Robin Hayes
- Melissa Thomson as Cassie Coulter
- Diana Reis as Stephanie Long
- Melissa DiMarco as Irene Stavros
- Nicole Hughes as Caroline Walker
- Matt Cooke as Terry Walker
- Michelle Martin and Jennifer Podemski as Michelle Martin
- Jessica Greco as Katie MacKenzie
- Kris Holden-Ried as Shawn Ritchie
- Simon Fraser as Doug Wilkes
- Gilmour the dog as Gilmour
