= Mike Lobel =

Canadian actor

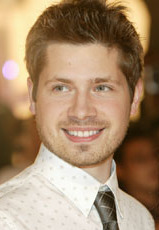
- Lobel at the 2007 eTalk Star Schmooze
- Born: Michael Ryan Lobel; March 7, 1984 (age 42); Toronto, Ontario, Canada
- Occupations: Actor; editor; director
- Years active: 2003–present
- Spouse: Mika Collins (m. 2022)

Michael Ryan Lobel (born March 7, 1984) is a Canadian editor, director, actor and musician. He is best known for playing the role of Jay Hogart in the teen drama Degrassi: The Next Generation as well as his work as picture editor of the HBO Max series Detention Adventure.

== Early life ==
Lobel was born to parents of Polish and Ashkenazi Jewish descent in Toronto, Ontario, Canada, where he also spent his early years. Lobel is the oldest of three siblings from the same parents. He has an older half-sister and older half-brother; they share the same father.

At a young age he began showing interest in music and visual arts which drew him to Etobicoke School of the Arts. He attended ESA from 1998 to 2003, first majoring in music (he studied percussion) then later switching to drama. While there, he formed several musical groups, including Civilian and the indie rock band Boys Who Say No. It was in his graduating year at ESA that he began working as an actor.

== Career ==
In 2003, Lobel made his film debut in an adaptation of Oliver Twist directed by Jacob Tierney entitled Twist, in which he played a small role as a street thug alongside actor Nick Stahl.

Lobel's most notable performance to date is his portrayal of Jay Hogart, a manipulative school bully on Degrassi: The Next Generation from 2003 to 2010. He maintains that he is nothing like his character in real life. Lobel originally auditioned for the role of Dylan Michalchuk, a complete opposite role of his current, but was instead offered the role of Jay.

In 2009, Lobel starred in Suck as Sam, the drummer of a touring rock & roll band besieged by vampires. He starred alongside rock & roll legends Alice Cooper, Henry Rollins and Iggy Pop. He has also appeared on television in Zixx: Level One and Sue Thomas F.B.Eye and has had starring roles in movies Selling Innocence, Booky Makes Her Mark and Degrassi Goes Hollywood. He made a guest appearance on a television series in 2007, The Best Years.

From 2011 to 2013, he played the role of DJ on the sitcom Really Me. In 2015, he played the small role of Marc in the Canadian TV movie The Music in Me.

In addition to acting, Lobel co-founded the indie pop band Future Peers in 2014 and has toured with the group across Canada, America, and Europe, playing the synth. The band broke up in 2019.

In 2016 Lobel began working as a picture editor, which led to his involvement in the production of HBO Max's Detention Adventure as an editor and director. Mike has also been an editor and director of several music videos and documentaries.

Lobel’s work on Detention Adventure earned him a Canadian Screen Award nomination in 2023.

In 2025 he released Don't Come Upstairs, a mid-length documentary film exploring the impact of his childhood, as the son of a father who would never tell his kids what he did for a living, on his life. The film was broadcast by CBC Television as an episode of The Passionate Eye.

== Personal life ==
Mike Lobel married Canadian actress and writer Mika Collins in September 2022.

== Filmography ==
=== Actor ===
Film
Year	Film	Role	Notes
2003	Twist	Bully	Film debut
2004	Decoys	Halloween Jock	
2004	Brave New Girl	Diz's Date	
2004	Prom Queen: The Marc Hall Story	Napoleon	Minor role
2005	Selling Innocence	Justin Johnson	TV film
2006	Booky Makes Her Mark	Lorne	TV film
2008	Degrassi Spring Break Movie	Jay Hogart	TV film
2008	Luggage	Bruce	
2009	Degrassi Goes Hollywood	Jay Hogart	
2009	Suck	Sam	
2010	Degrassi Takes Manhattan	Jay Hogart	
2010	The Science of Cool	N/A	
2015	The Music in Me	Marc	
Television
Year	Series	Role	Notes
2003–2010	Degrassi: The Next Generation	Jason "Jay" Hogart	57 episodes, 2003–2010 Seasons 3-4 (recurring); Seasons 5-7 (regular); Seasons 8-9 (guest starring)
2004	Sue Thomas: F.B.Eye	Lance Rose	"Into Thin Air" (season 2, episode 10)
2004	Zixx Level One	Lars	"Stuck on You" (season 1, episode 8)
2007	The Best Years	Handles McPherson	"Notorious" (season 1, episode 2)
2011–2013	Really Me	DJ	13 episodes, 2011–2013 Seasons 1 (main role)
2019–2022	Detention Adventure	Caretaker Jay	7 episodes, 2019–2022 (web series)

=== Editor ===
Film
Year	Film	Notes
2011	Distilled Love	Short film
2016	Frigid	Short film
2017	Must Kill Karl	Short film
2018	Rising Voices	Documentary feature
Television
Year	Series	Notes
2019–2022	Detention Adventure	Seasons 1-3

==== Other Credits ====
- The Nincompoops (Short) (2011) (composer)
- Distilled Love (Short) (2011) (composer)
- Frigid (Short) (2016) (composer)
- Must Kill Karl (Short) (2017) (composer)
- Detention Adventure (2022) (post production supervisor)
- Orphan Black: Echoes (2023) (trainee assistant editor)(post-production)
