= Melissa DiMarco =

Canadian actress and television personality

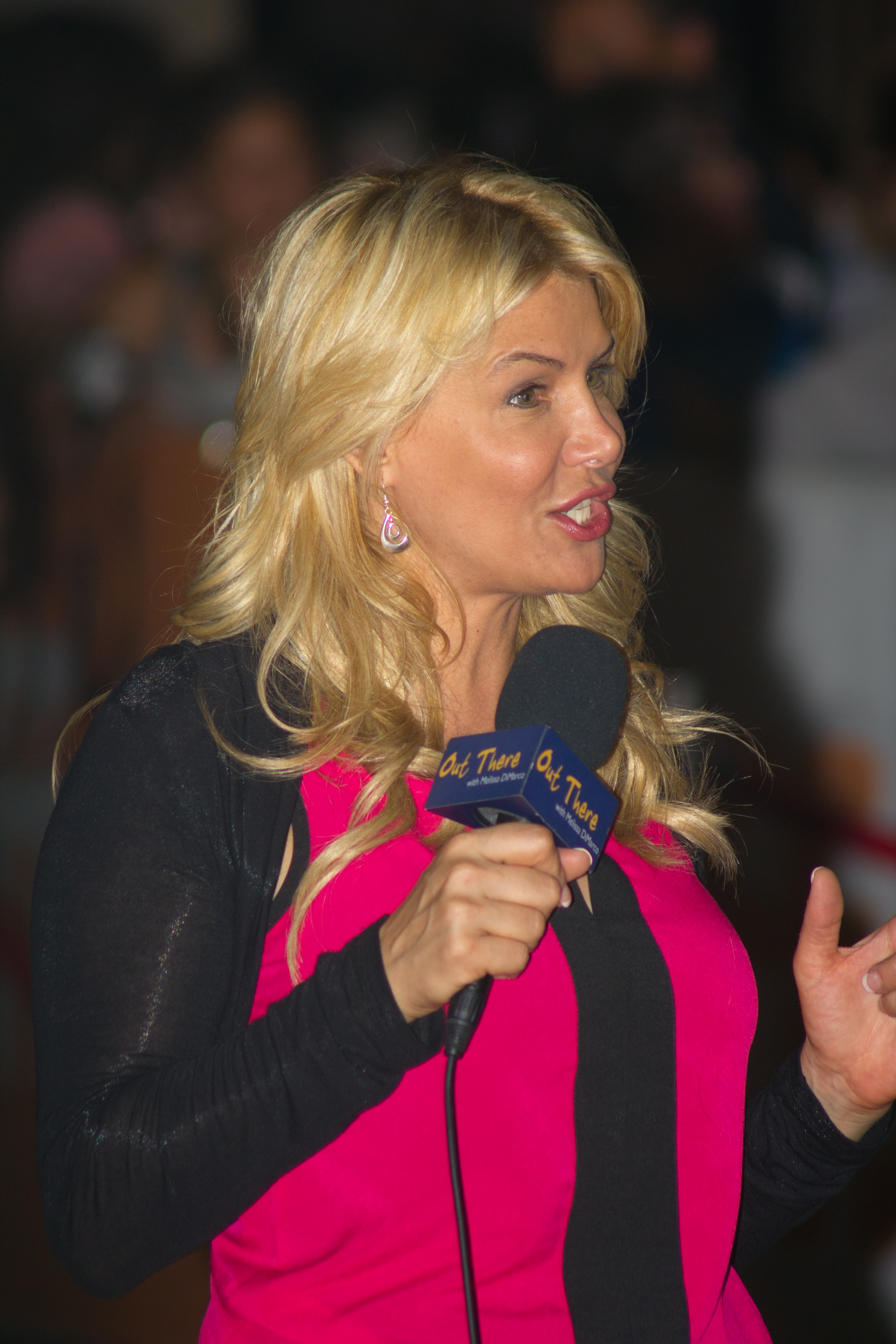
- Born: Toronto, Ontario, Canada
- Education: York University
- Occupations: Actress, Television Host, Producer, Writer, Documentary Film Maker
- Years active: 1995 – present
- Website: http://www.outtherewithmelissa.com

Melissa DiMarco is a Canadian actress, producer, and television personality. She has made acting appearances in feature films and television. She is best known for her role as Daphne Hatzilakos in the teen drama series Degrassi: The Next Generation (2002-2010) and as the host and showrunner of her own syndicated television program Out There with Melissa DiMarco.

== Career ==
On television, one of DiMarco's best-known acting parts was in the teen drama series Degrassi: The Next Generation as Daphne Hatzilakos, teacher and later Principal of Degrassi Community School. She played Hatzilakos for eight seasons (2002 - 2010). DiMarco's TV credits include the CBC soap opera Riverdale and guest-starring spots on series such as Due South, Blue Murder, The Hardy Boys, Psi Factor, Kung Fu: The Legend Continues, Relic Hunter, and Kojak.

Her film credits include roles in Peter Bogdanovich's Hustle: The Pete Rose Story, Duct Tape Forever (the film adaptation of The Red Green Show), The Rest of My Life: Degrassi Takes Manhattan, and Degrassi Spring Break Movie. She also appeared in Danny DeVito's dark comedy, Death to Smoochy.

She also directed, produced, and wrote Dreamseeker: Nia Vardalos, an award-winning documentary on the rise of Nia Vardalos of My Big Fat Greek Wedding fame and was the host and producer of Nite Life, an entertainment show that focused on celebrity interviews and the nightclub, bar, and concert scene, which aired on OMNI.

Since 2004, DiMarco has hosted Out There with Melissa DiMarco, a mockumentary television comedy which airs on Citytv's national network and The Biography Channel. Excerpts from DiMarco's celebrity interviews also air on OUTtv. The show parodies the entertainment industry, mixing celebrity interviews with scripted comedy that takes a behind-the-scenes look at the life of an entertainment journalist (played by DiMarco). Among the celebrities she has interviewed on the show are Pierce Brosnan, George Clooney, Cameron Diaz, Colin Farrell, Salma Hayek, Queen Latifah, Ludacris, Matthew McConaughey, Brad Pitt, and Gene Simmons. Updates and excerpts from these interviews are syndicated internationally. Out There has been recognized for Outstanding Achievement in Creative Excellence at the 39th U.S. International Film and Video Festival.

DiMarco is a Dean's Honour Roll graduate of the Fine Arts Program at York University and is a member of the Canadian Association of Journalists, the Academy of Canadian Cinema, and WIFT-T (Women in Film & Television Toronto).

== Filmography ==
Year	Title	Role	Notes
1995	The Hardy Boys	Reporter	Episode: "Love Birds"
1995	Side Effects	Belinda	Episode: "On the QT"; Episode: "Time Enough to Say Good-Bye"
1996	Due South	Stella	Episode: "Starman"
1996	Kung Fu: The Legend Continues	Jennie	Episode: "Shaolin Shot"
1997	Riverdale	Irene	TV series
1997	While My Pretty One Sleeps	Heidi	TV movies
1997	The Absolute Truth	Nurse	TV movies
1997	Time to Say Goodbye?	Courthouse Reporter	
1997	Psi Factor: Chronicles of the Paranormal	Katie Sheffield	Episode: "The Damned"
1999	Relic Hunter	Kate Yawley	Episode: "Diamond in the Rough"
2000	No Alibi	Stella	
2000	The Thin Blue Lie	Sandra Durano	TV movie
2001	Relic Hunter	Maxine Schneider	Episode: "Out of the Past"
2001	Blue Murder	Selena del Rio	Episode: "Partners"
2001	The Associates	Cameron	Episode: "E Pluribus Unum"
2001	Leap Years	Rosaline	Episode 1.9
2002	Degrassi: The Next Generation	Principal Daphne Hatzilakos	2002 - 2010 (91 episodes)
2002	Marker	Dianna	
2002	Death to Smoochy	Tara	
2002	Duct Tape Forever	Deputy Dawn	
2002	Adventure Inc.	Elizabeth Dillon	Episode: "Message from the Deep"
2003	Wild Card	Spa Manager	Episode: "Sand Trap"
2004	Out There with Melissa DiMarco	Actor / Host / Interviewer	2004–Present (144 episodes)
2004	Hustle	Carol Rose	TV movie
2004	Life After	Angeline	
2005	Bailey's Billion$	Tessa (voice)	
2005	Kojak	Nancy Pastori	Episode: "Hitman"; Episode: "Kind of Blue"
2008	Degrassi Spring Break Movie	Principal Daphne Hatzilakos	TV movie
2010	The Rest of My Life: Degrassi Takes Manhattan	Principal Daphne Hatzilakos	TV movie
2013	The Goree Girls	Erica Gilligan	Pre Production

=== Television Producer ===
- 2004: Dreamseeker: Nia Vardalos (documentary)
