= Melissa McIntyre =

Canadian former actress (born 1986)

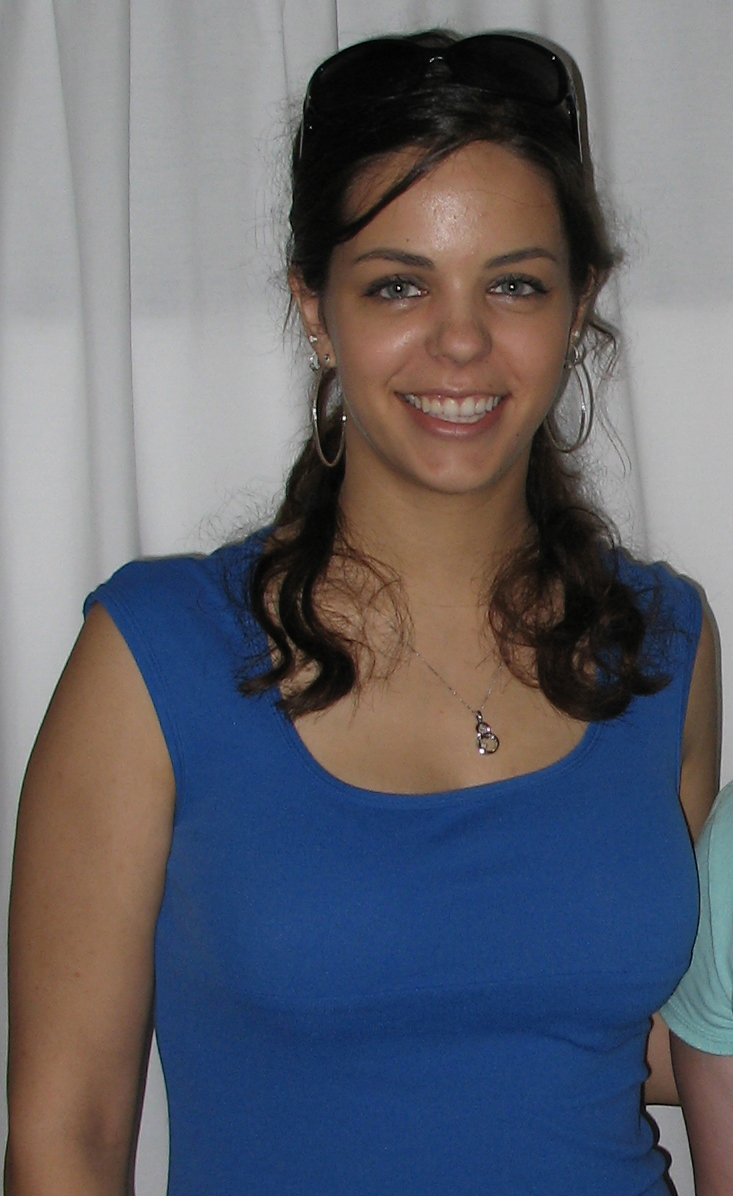
- McIntyre in June 2007
- Born: Melissa Erin McIntyre; May 31, 1986 (age 39); Port Colborne, Ontario, Canada
- Occupation: Actress
- Years active: 1987–2008

Melissa Erin McIntyre (born May 31, 1986) is a Canadian former television and theatre actress. She is best known for her role as Ashley Kerwin on the long-running CTV/The N teen drama Degrassi: The Next Generation.

== Early life ==
McIntyre was born and raised in Port Colborne, Ontario, Canada.

== Career ==
McIntyre was a participant in many community theatre plays as a child, including The Wizard of Oz and The Secret Garden. She made her stage debut in 1995 in P.M. Productions' Job and the Snake.

In 1998, she was cast in Discovery Kids TV series, Real Kids, Real Adventures.

McIntyre was also a radio actress, as she played the lead role in Disco Does Not Suck. She took some time off during 1999 to participate mainly in theatre, but in 2000 McIntyre, then 13 years old, returned to television, voicing the character "Cornflower" in the PBS animated series Mattimeo: A Tale of Redwall.

In 2001, she was cast in Degrassi: The Next Generation, a spin-off to the 1980s series Degrassi High. From 2001 until 2008, McIntyre played Ashley Kerwin.

Following her departure, she returned to stage acting, starring in a handful of musicals at Oh Canada Eh Dinner Show in Niagara Falls.

In 2012, she briefly appeared as a singer in former INXS frontman J.D. Fortune's band. She also was part of a jazz duo that played at local venues in Niagara Falls.

In 2018, McIntyre made a cameo appearance in Drake's music video "I'm Upset" with her former Degrassi co-stars. At this time, McIntyre was managing at a Toronto restaurant.

== Filmography ==
=== Television ===
Year	Title	Roles	Notes
1987	Timesweep	Nest alien	
1997	Real Kids, Real Adventures		
2000–2001	Redwall	Cornflower	Voice role; 13 episodes
2001–2008	Degrassi: The Next Generation	Ashley Kerwin	Main role; 96 episodes
2005	Sue Thomas: F.B. Eye	Heather Davis	Episode: "Bad Girls"
2007	Degrassi: Doing What Matters	Self	Television special
2008	Degrassi Spring Break Movie	Ashley Kerwin	Television film

=== Web series ===
Year	Title	Roles	Notes
2005–2008	Degrassi: Minis	Ashley Kerwin	8 episodes

=== Music video ===
Year	Title	Artist
2018	"I'm Upset"	Drake

== Theatre ==
Year	Title	Role	Director	Venue	Notes
1995	Job and the Snake	Elihu		Trinity Basement Theatre	
1997	The Children's Hour	Lois Fisher	Glynis Leyshon	Court House Theatre	

== Awards and nominations ==
Year	Award	Category	Nominated work	Result	Ref.
2002	Young Artist Awards	Best Ensemble in a TV Series (Comedy or Drama)	Degrassi: The Next Generation	Won	
2003	Young Artist Awards	Best Ensemble in a TV Series (Comedy or Drama)	Degrassi: The Next Generation	Nominated	
2005	Young Artist Awards	Best Young Ensemble Performance in a TV Series (Comedy or Drama)	Degrassi: The Next Generation	Nominated	
