= Heroic Television =

Canadian television production company

- Type: Private
- Industry: Television Production
- Founders: John May; Suzanne Bolch
- Headquarters: Toronto, Ontario, Canada
- Website: www.heroictv.ca

Founded in 2000, Heroic Television is a television production and development company consisting of John May and Suzanne Bolch.

The company produces children's television series for live action, animation and all the in between. Their shows have aired on YTV, Family Channel, ABC3, CBC, BBC Kids and the Disney Channel in Canada; and dozens of others around the world.

This company was previously Heroic Film Company, in 2000, by John May, Karen Lee Hall and Suzanne Bolch. The first production was the award winning sitcom Our Hero. Since, "'Heroic Television'" has won numerous awards, from the Writers Guild of Canada, The Alliance for Children and Television, Gemini Awards, Kidscreen, Youth Media Alliance and the Directors Guild of Canada.

== Productions ==
Title	Production year	Notes
"Our Hero"	2000-2002	First Series Produced; Produced by Heroic Television in association with Decode Entertainment; Distributed by DHX Media
"Captain Flamingo"	2006-2010	Co-Production with Atomic Cartoons, Breakthrough Films & Television and Philippine Animators Group; Distributed by Breakthrough Entertainment
"How to Be Indie"	2008-2011	Season 1 produced by Heroic Television; Season 2 Co-Produced by Heroic Television and with Sudden Storm Productions
"Connor Undercover"	2008-2011	Co-Production with Heroic Television and Shaftesbury Films; Distributed by Shaftesbury Sales Company
"Ranger Rob Season 2"	2019-2020	Co-Production with Heroic Television and Studio Liddell and Nelvana and Distributed by Centropolis Entertainment

=== Cancelled ===
Title	Production year	Notes
"How Embarrassing"	TBA	First Self-Reliable Animated Series Produced
"Dead Rockstars"	TBA	TBA
"Thirteen"	TBA	In Production with Treehouse TV
"Ready, Set, Jet!"	TBA	In Production with Nelvana Decode Entertainment and Treehouse TV
