= Gavin Fox =

Gavin Fox may refer to:

- Gavin Fox (musician), Irish bass player
- Gavin Fox (actor), Canadian actor
