= Wingin' It =

Canadian teen sitcom

- Starring: Dylan Everett; Demetrius Joyette; Jennifer Robertson; Jamie Bloch; Wayne Thomas Yorke; Brittany Adams; Brian Alexander White; Sebastian Hearn; Hannah Lochner; Kendra Timmins
- Theme music composer: Marco DiFelice; Benjamin Pinkerton; Jody Colero
- Opening theme: "Wingin' It", performed by Stereos
- Composers: Jody Colero; Marco DiFelice; Benjamin Pinkerton
- Country of origin: Canada
- No. of seasons: 3
- No. of episodes: 51

Production
- Executive producers: Frank van Keeken; Ivan Schneeberg; David Fortier
- Cinematography: Mitchell T. Ness (S1); Kim Derko (S2-3)
- Camera setup: Film; Single-camera
- Running time: Approx. 23 minutes
- Production company: Temple Street Productions

Original release
- Network: Family Channel
- Release: March 19, 2010 – June 22, 2012

Wingin' It (originally titled Angel on Campus prior to its debut) is a Canadian teen sitcom created by Frank Van Keeken which aired on Family Channel. The series was produced by Temple Street Productions in association with Family. It stars Demetrius Joyette and Dylan Everett. This show included guest-stars from other Family Channel shows such as The Latest Buzz. It was announced that the series was renewed for a third season on June 13, 2011. Family Channel announced that the series is not planned for a fourth season.

== Plot ==
Wingin' It is a family series about a friendship. One half of the friendship is Porter Jackson, a centuries-old angel-in-training (AIT) who has been sent to Earth to get his angel wings posing as a carefree sixteen-year-old student. The other half is Carl Montclaire, a fifteen-year-old typical high school kid who has been going through a run of bad luck. Little things seem to always be going wrong in Carl's life. For Porter to get his angel wings, he's been given the assignment of making Carl the most popular kid at Bennett High. In season 3, Jane knows that Porter is an angel-in-training and helps him through the various problems he has with his magic.

== Cast and characters ==
=== Main ===
- Dylan Everett as Carl Montclaire – Porter's task of making Carl Montclaire the most popular student in school looks like a lost cause at first. Carl is not particularly popular and very unlucky. But with Porter's help he becomes more appreciated by winning a basketball tournament, starring in the school play and hosting his own radio show, among other things. Carl is interested in girls and in the first series he has a crush on the beautiful but unintelligent Brittany. But he never has proper feelings for her, whereas in the second series he has a much bigger crush on Jane, who was previously just his best friend, following their kiss in the school play featured in Drama-rama at the end of Season 1. At the end of the second series Carl figures out that Jane prefers Porter, and is very depressed for a while afterwards, when he admits to himself and to Jane that their relationship can't go anywhere. At the end of that episode, a rejected Carl is seen brooding over the future. He then shares a kiss with Denise in the final moments of that episode, and when the season resumes, he has returned to being only friends with Jane and being out with Denise, although that is strictly prohibited. This does not stop them, however, until Mildred Stern, comes down to investigate, after being tipped off by Denise's ex-boyfriend, Lex. In the third season his feelings for Jane return, she reciprocates, and they begin to date.
- Demetrius Joyette as Porter Jackson – Porter Jackson is a few centuries old AIT that is also a bit of a troublemaker. In heaven he's a very powerful angel with infinite magic coursing through him as told by Dr. Cassabi in one of the episodes. He's naturally popular and a cool guy. Porter boasts that he could make any kid popular, but in Carl Montclaire, it looks like he may have met his match. He himself is a prankster and popular, up above. However, thanks to him Carl's popularity increases, although he has not yet become popular enough for Porter to be granted his angel wings. Despite helping Carl in his attempts to ask out Jane in season 2, it is revealed in Magical Kiss-Tery Tour that he also has affections for Jane, forcing Carl into a difficult decision. When the series resumes, there has thus far been no sign of the Porter-Jane relationship reappearing. In the episode "Live and Let Fly" Porter becomes a full angel but because he completed his assignment, he was forced to leave Carl.
- Wayne Thomas Yorke as Dr. J. Bartholomew Cassabi – Posing as Bennett High's guidance counsellor, Dr Cassabi is actually an AIT advisor. He assists Porter and later Denise when things go wrong, which is regular.
- Kendra Timmins as Denise Simmons (previously Dennis) – Dr. Cassabi's living raccoon puppet who acts as his helper and occasional spy. Dennis was actually a former AIT named Denise who accidentally trapped herself in the raccoon puppet back in the 15th century. Porter manages to release Denise from the raccoon puppet in season 2. Denise quickly becomes Porter's female counterpart – like Porter, she is a trouble maker who has a tendency to misuse her magic, and is very good at getting into trouble. Denise is also a good singer. She has affections for Carl which can be noticed throughout the season, although they are only returned at the end of season 2.1. When the season resumes Denise and Carl are dating, although this is complicated by the rules against angel-human relationships. Matt Ficner and Mike Petersen portray Denise as Dennis the raccoon. In the episode, "Live and Let Fly", Brittany becomes her angel assignment.
- Brittany Adams as Jane Casey – Jane is the smartest kid in school and not self-conscious about it. She's always looking for a new club to join and leads many of them, including the school newspaper. She is pro-active and not only writes the school play in season one but also picks the cast and eventually stars in it herself. She and Carl have been best friends since kindergarten, and she and Brittany become friends in season 2.1. She is unaware of Carl's true feelings for her in season 2.1, and doesn't know that she is hurting his feelings when she kisses Porter in Magical Kiss-tery Tour. She only finds out afterwards, and feels guilty and slightly depressed about the romantic triangle. However, upon the resumption of the series, the Jane-Porter relationship does not rematerialise, and Carl has also got over his previous feelings for Jane. In the second-season finale she witnesses Porter performing magic, and Porter and Denise reveal to her that they are A.I.T's. She is shown to have developed feelings for Carl in 'Practical Romance'.
- Brian Alexander White as Alejandro "Alex" Horatio P. Rodriguez – As Jane and Carl say, the only thing you can say about their Mexican, Swahili-speaking, Unicorn-loving friend is 'he's Alex'. He rarely has a major role in episodes and tends to be there for comedic value only, such as when he is Carl's gag man in 'Montclaire on the Air'.
- Sebastian Hearn as Serge Delvecchio – Originally a bully to Carl, Serge becomes more like a friend, although he can turn it on and off. He is the best athlete at Bennett High, but he's not exactly the sharpest tool in the box. He speaks as himself in a third person. He is a useful pawn, and shows a slightly more emotional side in 'I Carlie' when he starts crushing on Carl's girl form, Carlie.
- Hannah Lochner as Brittany Hanson – Brittany is popular for no apparent reason other than that she is beautiful. Although she aspires to be a famous singer, she is untalented in that area and is actually better suited to acting. She and Jane become friends in season 2.1. In the episode, "Live and Let Fly", she becomes Denise's angel assignment.
- Jennifer Robertson as Angela Montclaire – As Carl's mom, she can be embarrassing and patronising but cares deeply for her son.
- Jamie Bloch as Becky Montclaire – As Carl's sister, she claims that her job is to wind up Carl, although as her mum points out in "Basket Case", she does seem to work overtime.

=== Recurring ===
- Steven Morel as Principal Malone – Bennett High's fun but fair principal, he is a bit cheesy at times and plays the ukulele, he is also desperate to get a new car.
- Jennifer Parsons as Mrs. Lennox – Bennett High's flighty English/Drama teacher. She finds out about the A.I.T.s in 'School Spirit', but when the timeline was erased she returns to being clueless again.
- Matt Baram as Mr. Dolby – Bennett High's nerdy and slightly eccentric Science teacher.
- Eugene Clark as Coach Heinrich – Bennett High's high-strung and competitive Gym teacher.
- Denis Akiyama as Mr. Nakamora – Bennett High's shifty Math teacher.
- Pat McKenna as Mr. Telson – Bennett High's eternally angry History teacher who shouts at people for no good reason and apparently "Hates everyone equally".
- Emma Gibbs as Melissa – Always looking to be included and always eager to please. She has feelings for Serge and starts dating him in the last episode of Season 3.
- Naomi Snieckus as Mildred Stern – Heaven's uber strict bureaucrat.
- Caitlyn Piotrowski and Katrina Mahoney as The Listern Sisters – Bennett High's resident spooky duo. They seldom speak and are a general mystery to the rest of the students; they even creep the angels out. In the episode, "Live and Let Fly", they are revealed to be angels watching over Porter, and stay after he leaves (presumably to watch over Denise.) Their creepy appearance is revealed to be a disguise, and they are actually pretty in their real state.

== Production ==
The series is produced by Temple Street Productions and BBC Worldwide Sales & Distribution in association with Family Channel.

Season One started filming in mid-2009 and ended in late October. A total of 13 twenty-five-minute episodes have been produced for series one. It was announced the second series would premiere on the Family Channel in January 2011.

The theme song is sung by Canadian band Stereos and features the main cast in the video. Principal Photography on the second season began filming on July 5, 2010 in North York, Ontario. The School used in the production was an actual school (Melody Road Public School) opened in 1952 and used for a couple of decades before being closed due to declining enrollment. The second series was divided into two parts, seasons 2.1 and 2.2. On July 31, 2011, Family accounted either 10 or 26 episodes in Season 3 and 10 episodes were eventually made. Family said that it would premiere on August 26, 2011, but got pushed back indefinitely due to season 2.2. An original press release states that new episodes would have started on September 24, 2012 but the third season was pushed back again. Season 3 is now airing in Canada. Season 3 started production in January 2012 and was broadcast in June 2012 on CBBC. Season 3 began airing on Family Channel in Canada in late February 2013.

== Episodes ==
=== Series overview ===
Season	Episodes	Originally released	
Season	Episodes	First released	Last released
1	13	March 19, 2010	June 20, 2010
2	28	January 28, 2011	December 24, 2011
3	10	June 11, 2012	June 22, 2012

=== Season 1 (2010) ===
No. overall	No. in season	Title	Directed by	Written by	Original release date
1	1	"Basket Case"	Steve Wright	Frank Van Keeken	April 3, 2010
Equipped with the seemingly impossible AIT assignment of making Carl Montclaire the most popular kid at Bennett High School, Porter Jackson poses as Carl's long lost cousin from Vancouver to everybody but Carl, to whom he explains his situation. Carl tries to tell his friends that Porter is an angel, but instead manages to convince them that he's Japanese. Carl is further riled when Porter signs him up for a basketball shootout against sport supremo Serge. Serge takes a 20–0 lead but Porter's magic allows Carl to level the game. Dr Cassabi arrives in time to lift the enchantment, but Carl sinks the final shot anyway.
2	2	"She Blinded Me With Science"	Ron Murphy	Ramona Barckert	April 3, 2010
Blinded by her good looks, Carl chooses Brittany to be his science labs partner despite agreeing to write Alex's name down instead. Alex is annoyed and so is Porter, whose magic – plus Brittany's science incompetence – convince Carl he made the wrong choice.
3	3	"Getting Out Of Dodge"	Ron Murphy	Roger Fredericks	April 11, 2010
When Serge tells Carl that he'll make mincemeat out of him in the upcoming dodgeball unit, Carl pleads Porter for help. Porter's enchantment helps Carl to dodge every ball, impress the girls, especially one named Linda. and also dodge both questions and chores. But when he dodges his first kiss and even starts dodging Porter's spells, Dr Cassabi has to rope in a team of experts to undo the enchantment. Guest appearance: Marline Yan Note:This is the second time Dylan Everett and Marline Yan have starred in the same TV show. The first was YTV's How to Be Indie.
4	4	"Cheer Me Up"	Steve Wright	A.M. Reid & Max Reid	April 18, 2010
When a member of the Bennett High cheerleading team sprains her ankle, and opening appears on the squad. Brittany signs Carl up based on a DVD of his moves, forged by Porter in hope of increasing his popularity. Another spell from Porter makes Carl the best cheerleader on the squad, but when she hears that Carl could replace her as captain, Brittany swaps Carl's exam paper with Alex's. The resulting C grade gets Carl kicked off the team, and although he makes one final appearance after his Maths teacher overrules his grade, he steps down from the team. This episode also features Jane's search for the missing chapter of her favourite book, Cosmonaut Claire, which is later relevant in the season 2 episode Reel Trouble.
5	5	"One Flu Over the Talent Show"	Steve Wright	A.M. Reid & Max Reid	April 25, 2010
When the main sponsor of the school's volleyball team pulls out of a deal to send the side to the tournament, Carl, Porter and Jane think up ways to raise the required funds. The idea of a talent show is agreed upon, and auditions are held. Things seem to be going well but when the star act pulls out, it seems that there will be no headline act. Porter thinks up a plan to make Carl's band, the Quesadillas, the stars of the show, but when Porter cannot perform due to a case of angel flu, he uses magic to help Carl perform an unorthodox version of This Little Light Of Mine, which is a big hit with the audience.
6	6	"Hold the Dressing"	Steve Wright	A.M. Reid & Max Reid	May 2, 2010
When Brittany exudes about a new fashion shop called Failed State, Porter enchants Carl into telling her he works there, thinking it might increase his popularity. Carl is then forced to go through a job interview process, and with the help of Porter he is given a job in stock. However, when an old woman asks him to try on a dress, he feels out of his depth, particularly when asked to twirl in the shop. He is seen by fashion guru Franz, who hires him to be the star of his fashion show. Jane and Alex are struggling to finish a business assignment on time but Carl's new fashion statement saves them. Note: This episode marks the first time the events and/or story-line do not take place at Carl's home or at Bennett High. This episode takes place at Dufferin Mall in Toronto's West End.
7	7	"Spinner and the Saint"	Michael Mabbott	Conor Casey & Lyndon Casey	May 9, 2010
With Porter's help Carl successfully DJs a house party, but he and Porter are grounded by Carl's mum. They magic up doubles to take their places at home when they attempt to sneak out to the school disco, but the doubles prefer partying and lock them in the room.
8	8	"Big Hairy Deal"	Steve Wright	Roger Fredericks	May 16, 2010
Becky mocks Carl's milk moustache at breakfast one morning, but Carl is not perturbed and believes that a moustache would suit him. Ever the mischief maker, Porter gives him one, but forgets that magic moustaches last a week. Carl heads to school with his face covered, but when uncovered he is mistaken by Serge for a teacher. To add to his look of maturity Porter dresses him up in a suit, but he is mistaken by Principal Malone to be Mr Becker, a maths supply teacher. Carl begins to enjoy being a teacher and becomes popular with the students, although he has to wear a number of different styles of facewear at home. But when the Principal summons both Carl and his teaching alter-ego to the office, more magic is required to save the day.
9	9	"Porter Jackson Can't Lose"	Michael Mabbott	Ramona Barckert	May 23, 2010
Jane surprisingly names Carl as her running mate for the school election, but many of their policies and ideas are challenged by Brittany and Serge, particularly the plan to abolish ski club. They nominate Porter to be president, but Porter knows nothing of this, and attempts to swing things in Carl's favour by adorning him with a badge which reads whatever the reader wants to see, and by dressing up as a nerd, naming Alex as his running mate and giving a less than inspiring speech of "I, Porter Jackson, don't want to be president". But even that is greeted with a standing ovation. Eventually Porter is forced to crush his own presidential campaign with a magicked up slideshow of him playing basketball with a rival school's mascot.
10	10	"School Spirit"	Ron Murphy	A.M. Reid & Max Reid	May 30, 2010
After Carl's mum embarrasses him at the school bake sale, he wishes that he was no longer her son for a short time only. But as usual Porter's magic goes awry and Carl ends up in an overlapping alternate reality. He meets Lou, an AIT who disappeared as a result of similar magic in the 1950s, and she helps him to get back to the real World. Despite not escaping herself, she is granted her angel wings and says goodbye to Carl before heading to heaven. Episode with body swap: Sebastian Hearn (as Serge Delvecchio) to ? (blond female), Brittany Adams (as Jane Casey) ↔ Hannah Lochner (as Brittany Hanson).
11	11	"Do Over"	Ron Murphy	A.M. Reid & Max Reid	June 6, 2010
Carl's failure to properly prepare for a history assignment leads to an awful performance, and to Jane being enraged at him. Porter's magic gives him a do over, but despite nailing it time continues to repeat itself. By the fourth attempt Carl is answering questions before they've even been asked, but by the seventh he's gone insane and is rude to everyone, only to discover that Porter has fixed the time lock, and Carl is forced to apologize to everyone.
12	12	"Almost Too Famous"	Ron Murphy	Ramona Barckert & Roger Fredericks	June 13, 2010
Carl bemoans the fact that everyone, including his family, is ignoring him, so Porter magically makes him the center of attention. Carl enjoys the attention at first but eventually becomes too popular with everyone, including Principal Malone, who invents a Carl theme song. Porter tries to divert fame onto someone else but that only makes matters worse. Carl eventually steps out of the spotlight, letting the notoriously quiet Listern Sisters enjoy their 15 minutes of fame when they suddenly decide to speak up. Note: The center of attention magic doesn't work on those who love Carl e.g. his family. However, Jane isn't affected by it, showing she might have secret feelings of love.
13	13	"Dramarama"	Ron Murphy	A.M. Reid & Max Reid	June 20, 2010
When Jane writes the end-of-year school play, 'The Sour Milkman', she asks Carl and Porter to audition. Carl does so in hope of kissing the leading woman, Brittany, but despite his being the best audition, star power rules and Porter gets the role. However, he deliberately feigns breaking his ankle so that Carl can take his place, but Brittany also steps down because she can't kiss Porter. The only person left for the role of Ethel is playwright Jane, and she and Carl kiss at the end. Despite his superb performance Porter sees that Carl is acting weirdly, and correctly guesses that his kiss with Jane has made him see her in a different light.

=== Season 2 (2011–12) ===
No. overall	No. in season	Title	Directed by	Written by	Original release date
14	1	"Under Her Spell"	Shawn Alex Thompson	Frank Van Keeken	January 28, 2011
Carl arrives back at school with the intention of asking Jane out, but he turns into a blubbering mess every time he tries, admitting to Porter "my backpack could make better conversation". So could Porter, for that matter, so he and Carl attempt to perform a body swap. But Dennis the Raccoon turns up and Carl ends up trapped inside the puppet, while a girl called Denise ends up inside Carl's body. Jane thinks that 'Carl' is mocking her with his high voice when in fact it is Denise's voice that she can hear. Carl finally gets back into his own body at the end and manages to talk to Jane, but fails to pluck up the courage to ask her out. Note: Kendra Timmins joins the cast as Denise Simmons at the end of this episode.
15	2	"Me Carl, You Jane-ish"	Mitchell Ness	Brian Hartigan	February 5, 2011
Jane attends a seminar and Carl, hoping to impress, volunteers to cover for her in history class. Denise is eager to help but her magic is still not brilliant and the zombie Jane she creates is far from convincing or intelligent, resulting in an F grade for Carl and Jane's history presentation. Jane is devastated and asks if they can get a second chance. With the help of the two AITs, they achieve an A+.
16	3	"Bully Elliot"	Shawn Alex Thompson	Chloe van Keeken	February 12, 2011
When the girls' football team reaches the semi-finals and then the final, Bennett High's regular coach is not available to teach Carl's class the badminton unit. An upper school student takes the role and sets about bullying the class into submission, with a particular penchant for abusing Carl, even out of lessons. Carl eventually takes a stand against the bully by challenging him to a game of badminton, which he wins with Porter's 'assistance'. The bully refuses to step down as coach but is sacked from his position when Porter's magic gives him hallucinations and he yells at the class, and his outburst is heard by the coach and Principal Malone. Absent: Kendra Timmins as Denise Simmons Note: This episode premiered between seasons during Family Channel's Stand Up! Week. Due to originally being in season 1 Dennis would have been in this episode; however neither Dennis nor Denise appear in the episode – presumably to prevent confusion or continuity errors.
17	4	"Montclaire on the Air"	Steve Wright	Scott Oleszkowicz	February 12, 2011
Carl volunteers to be the school's radio DJ, and is brilliant at it even without the assistance of magic. His cheek make the show a hit with the students but he goes one prank too far when he prank calls Principal Malone to tell him he's won a new car. Upset that Carl would prank him in such a way, the Principal attempts to shut down 'Montclaire on the Air', but Carl simply broadcasts from a secret location. When found, Carl is forced to instruct the students to step into line, but he is unable to bring himself to do it and closes down the radio station.
18	5	"Err a Parent"	Mitchell Ness	Ramona Barckert	February 19, 2011
Porter forges the signature of his father, Artie Jackson (Arnold Pinnock), so that he can go on a school field trip. Principal Malone is intrigued and wishes to meet Artie, whom Carl impersonates over the phone. However, Carl's mom overhears the conversation and thinks that Porter's dad is downstairs. Denise arrives and transforms herself into Artie Jackson, but she uses her disguise to embarrass Porter and attempt to have him transferred out of Bennett High. Porter fights fire with fire by mimicking his mother, Portia, and delays the signing of the forms for long enough as Denise begins to turn back into herself.
19	6	"Taking Care of Quiz-ness"	Shawn Alex Thompson	Roger Fredericks	February 26, 2011
Porter volunteers Carl for the roles of understudy and captain on Bennett High's Quizzomatics game show team. His team-mates are Brittany, Jane, Serge and Alex, although he quickly becomes impatient as they struggle to comprehend the workings of a buzzer. Fearing that even if they do overcome this incomprehension they will be battered by rivals Terendale High, Carl and Serge decide to do some espionage, but an alarm sounds and Carl asks Porter to beam Serge away. Although Carl and Porter escape punishment at school, Porter looks likely to face expulsion from the AIT programme for use of magic on a minor. Meanwhile, the team reaches the final of the competition, but Alex is taken ill and Carl is forced to step in. He stutters his way through questions and looks set to lose the competition for Bennett. Porter explains how his magic has helped Carl and creates a video link to the quiz, where Carl's successful answering of the last question convinces the judge to dismiss Porter's case.
20	7	"To Serge with Love"	Graeme Campbell	Barbara Haynes	March 12, 2011
New foreign exchange student Bianca (Kristina Virro) only speaks Brajikistani, so when she tries to talk to Principal Malone her words fall on deaf ears. Porter gives Carl the ability to speak Brajikistani, and he becomes her official translator. As Carl puts it, she is the 'female Serge', and sure enough Serge soon falls for her. But when Carl tries to translate his compliments, Bianca thinks that it is Carl who is saying them, and she falls for him. Serge is very jealous when he sees them together but Carl pities him and gives him a makeover to make him more attractive to Bianca. Meanwhile Porter, Denise, and Dr. Cassabi are forced to recalibrate their magic after it keeps going wrong.
21	8	"All Lizards Go to Heaven (Part 1)"	Shawn Alex Thompson	Chloe van Keeken	March 14, 2011
Becky leaves her pet lizard alone in the house with Carl and Porter, but forgets to shut the cage. As a result the lizard escapes and is trodden on by Carl. Porter panics when he hears Becky returning and performs regeneration magic on the lizard. But this is a banned practice, and Agent 45 (Scott Thompson) is sent down to Earth to arrest the culprit. After interviewing several of Porter's friends he makes no progress, so decides to arrest Denise instead. Porter can't stand to see Denise taking the blame, so he owns up to the crime. Agent 45 arrests him and releases Denise, but Porter pleads not guilty and is sent to court for a trial. He calls Carl as his first witness.
22	9	"All Lizards Go to Heaven (Part 2)"	Shawn Alex Thompson	Frank Van Keeken	March 14, 2011
The double bill resumes with Carl in the courtroom, but his testimony is shaky and when Porter calls Dr. Cassabi as his lawyer he just spouts off a long list of courtroom catchphrases, and is dismissed by the tribunal. Carl is returned to Earth, where he talks Denise into helping him help Porter, although she requests that he take her on a date. The tribunal rules that Porter be expelled from the AIT programme and tries to expel him to oblivion, but Carl and Denise arrive in time. They bring with them several AITs from around the World, who have been inspired by Porter to use regeneration magic. A graphic shows the use of regeneration magic occurring across the globe, and the show of solidarity changes the court's mind about expelling Porter. Carl and Denise date at the end, and although this is not shown, it is a sign of things to come between them. Note: Zach Everett, Dylan Everett's real-life brother, guest stars as one of the AITs.
23	10	"Best Before Date"	Graeme Campbell	Scott Oleszkowicz	March 25, 2011
Jane organises the annual Cool Guy Charity Auction, where the boys are sold to the girls, who bid with their own money which goes to auction. Jane's aim is to bid on all the boys to up the bids to as high as possible, and although Porter has hatched a plan to get Jane and Carl to go together, Brittany has thought things through for once, and she tricks Jane into buying Porter for $200. Brittany then buys Carl for a tenner, because she doesn't really want a date, she wants to sing for concert star Fefe Dobson. Porter tries unsuccessfully to make Jane jealous of Brittany by giving Carl and Brittany backstage passes. There, Brittany auditions to Fefe, but is left embarrassed and Carl is forced to cheer her up. Porter gives up on the cryptic trail and tells Jane flat out that Carl likes her, but she sees Brittany and Carl kissing. The next day Jane does seem jealous when Brittany says that she and Carl are a couple, and Carl breaks up with Brittany with the intention of asking out Jane. But she stops him in his tracks and tells him she was only worried about him as a friend, much to Carl's well concealed annoyance.
24	11	"Reel Trouble"	Graeme Campbell	Brian Hartigan	April 22, 2011
Jane could not be more excited when she wins Bennett High a preview screening of the film adaptation of her favourite science fiction book, Cosmonaut Claire. Jane asks Carl to preview the DVD before the screening. When the DVD player malfunctions, Porter attempts a magical fix, but accidentally beams Space Pirate Bruce (Jamie Johnston) out of the film. Porter and Carl chase Bruce around the school and manage to send him back into the film, but Jane accidentally gets sucked in with him and assumes the role of Cosmonaut Claire. Carl must go into the movie himself and defeat Bruce in order to bring Jane back to the real world. Porter transports Carl into the movie and Cosmonaut Carl helps Cosmonaut Claire (Jane) save the universe. Just as Porter is about to transport them back, Cosmonaut Claire (Jane) gives Cosmonaut Carl a kiss. Once outside the movie, Jane doesn't remember a thing that happened. In the alternate ending that aired on April 25, Carl and Jane take a vacation on planet Beachtonia after saving the universe, later joined by Porter and Denise. Carl is then shown back in the real world still watching the DVD, suggesting that Carl fantasized the whole adventure.
25	12	"Carl+Alt+Delete"	Graeme Campbell	Ramona Barckert	May 26, 2011
When Porter's magic accidentally sends Carl into Jane's computer, Carl gets bounced around to several different electronic devices. He eventually makes his way into the computer of a new student, Ty (Brandon Craggs), and discovers that Ty has been cheating on his tests. Worse still, when Porter eventually frees Carl from the computer, Ty frames Carl for hacking Mr. Dolby's (Matt Baram) computer. Carl faces expulsion and has until the end of the day to prove that he is innocent. Also tackling a tricky situation is Denise, who tries to get Brittany and Serge to understand Oliver Twist. She brings back Charles Dickens (Eric Peterson) for help, but even he has trouble getting them to relate to anything but themselves. Carl manages to get into Ty's computer and proves his innocence by e-mailing the proof to Principal Malone. Denise eventually gets Brittany and Serge to relate to Oliver Twist by making them imagine what would happen if their phone or reputation was taken away from them. They finally understand what life was like for Oliver and successfully act out the play in front of the class.
26	13	"Magical Kiss-Tery Tour"	Mitchell Ness	Scott Oleszkowicz	June 15, 2011 (UK.); July 29, 2011 (CAN.)
When Carl can't pluck up the courage to ask Jane out, Porter enchants him with a magical kiss spell. But the magic goes awry when Carl kisses the wrong girl. The spell is passed around like an epidemic, and Porter reveals that it can only be broken if two people who actually have feelings for each other kiss. If this happens, then not only will the spell break, but both people will see fireworks. When the spell reaches Jane, Porter offers to kiss her in order to remove the spell. But when he does and the spell breaks, Carl is both shocked and devastated to learn that Porter and Jane like each other. He tells Jane how he feels about her, but that he is now over it and things will go back to their normal friendship. In the end, Denise tells Carl that Jane is missing out and that she's never been kissed before. In response to this, Carl kisses her and walks away. After he leaves, Denise sees fireworks. Note: This episode acts as the mid-season finale and the last episode of season 2.1.
27	14	"Reality Bites"	Don McCutcheon	Roger Fredericks	October 1, 2011
Carl joins Brittany's latest project, a school news show, under one condition: he gets to be the weatherman. When he argues with Brittany on the air, they are both shocked to discover their banter is a hit. A fast talking TV Producer, Steve McT, convinces them to star in a reality show where they play a bickering brother and sister. While Brittany cannot get enough of the attention, Carl is not having any fun at all, especially when the reality show invades his home life. Note: This episode acts as the mid-season premiere and the first episode of season 2.2.
28	15	"Lucy in the Sky with Carl"	Paul Fox	Chloe van Keeken	October 8, 2011
When Carl helps out Porter by going undercover to work his shift at the Angel Café, he is a hit with the patrons, especially a group of Angel in Training students who get insight from Carl about human behaviour. When a mischievous young Angel, Lucy, discovers Carl is a human, she accompanies him down to Earth. She is determined to learn more about the mysterious human, leaving Carl and Porter scrambling to cover up her magical misdeeds.
29	16	"Fright Club" "Hold for Halloween"	Graeme Campbell	Roger Fredericks	October 8, 2011
Porter inadvertently creates a real monster when he and Carl help Jane with her haunted house. All the while, Jane goes to a slumber party at Brittany's house, only to find that the only reason she was invited was to help Brittany with her homework.
30	17	"Hands Solo"	Steve Wright	Frank Van Keeken	October 15, 2011
Carl and Porter are surprised when Alex's Dad arrives at Bennett High to announce that Alex must defend their family's honour in a sacred hand dance duel. When Alex breaks his arm and cannot take part in the duel, Carl reluctantly steps in, but first he has to go through a bizarre initiation that includes riding on Grand-ma-ma Rodriguez's back through a field of eggs. Meanwhile, Jane and Serge compete to determine who is better at school, sports and pretty much everything else.
31	18	"Without a Paddle"	David Warry-Smith	Roger Fredericks	October 22, 2011
In a bet with the principal from Terrendale High, Principal Malone volunteers Carl and friends to compete in the upcoming Physics Games. Everyone is looking forward to it, except Carl, who is stuck with the dreaded ping pong challenge against a brilliant competitor. Trying to impress Carl, Denise gives him a little magical assistance in the form of a ping pong paddle that slows down time. But when the paddle breaks, and Carl gets stuck in slowed-time-world, he has to figure out how to get in touch with Porter and Denise before he disappears forever.
32	19	"Alex in Slumberland"	Conor Casey & Lyndin Casey	Graeme Campbell	October 29, 2011
Alex is staying with Carl and Porter and he is driving them nuts with his sleepless habits. Porter uses angel-magic to put Alex to sleep but, when Alex will not wake up, Carl and Porter have no choice but to wake him from inside his dream. Failing to wake Alex and narrowly escaping capture from a cast of kooky dream characters, Porter beams back to the real world only to discover he brought back the dream version of Carl, leaving the real Carl trapped in Alex's dream. In the meantime, Denise is excited for her first date with Carl, but is left fuming when he does not show.
33	20	"I Carlie"	Don McCutcheon	Barbara Haynes	November 5, 2011
After a clueless Carl offends Denise on their first date, she shows him what it is like to be a girl by turning him into one. It is not long before Serge falls for Carlie, the new girl at school, and the pressure is on Porter to find a solution. He turns Denise into Denny to give her a taste of her own medicine, but the only way to reverse the magic is for Carlie and Denny to learn what it is like to be one another. Meanwhile, Jane gets a part time job at Mama B's pizza and develops a crush on a cute boy, which jeopardizes her new job.
34	21	"Friday Afternoon Fever"	Brian Hartigan	Mitchell Ness	November 12, 2011
Porter helps Carl out at the school's charity dance-a-thon by putting some non-stop dance magic on him, but when Carl cannot stop dancing Porter is forced to seek help from above. Back at Bennett High, Jane hosts a telethon as Carl continues to dance non-stop for charity. If Carl keeps dancing he will break a world record, much to Jane's delight. But when Porter returns with a cure, Carl must find the strength to keep dancing without the magic.
35	22	"Don't Dimension It"	Barbara Haynes	Steve Wright	November 19, 2011
When Carl complains to Porter and Denise that he is bored with his ho-hum life, they create a magical clubhouse inside his locker. When Carl and Porter emerge from the locker, they are shocked to discover they are in another dimension. The pair must navigate a kung fu dimension, a pirate planet and a film-noir world in their quest to make it home.
36	23	"Heaven Must Be Missing an Angel"	Ramona Barckert	Don McCutheon	November 26, 2011
The tables are turned for once when Porter is the one who is lovesick and Carl has to play matchmaker. Porter has fallen for JenJen, an Angel in Training he met up in Heaven, but, unfortunately, whenever he is around her he makes an utter fool of himself. When Carl volunteers to help Porter write a love letter, a furious Denise, who is dating Carl, assumes Carl is in love with JenJen himself, which causes even more trouble. Meanwhile, when Serge and Alex discover a treasure trove of lost objects on the school's roof, they open a shop to sell the items, but will they work as business partners? Absent: Wayne Thomas Yorke as Dr. Cassabi and Brittany Adams as Jane Casey
37	24	"I Kinda Always Knew I'd Be Your Lex-Boyfriend"	David Warry-Smith	Brian Hartigan	January 4, 2012
Carl is wary when Denise's ex-boyfriend Lex shows up, claiming to be there for an innocent visit. Before long, Carl realises that Lex is actually trying to expose Carl and Denise's relationship – after all, an angel is forbidden to date a human. When Ms Stern is brought in from Heaven, Carl and Denise enlist Porter's help to get them out of trouble while exposing Lex's dastardly plan. Meanwhile, when Jane returns Brittany's lost necklace but doesn't get the promised reward, she turns the tables – with drastic consequences.
38	25	"Malone's Your Uncle"	Chloe Van Keeken	Steve Wright	January 11, 2012
When Carl meets Bennett High's new British exchange student, Tinsley, he is determined to date her. But when he tries to ask her uncle, Principal Malone, for permission, he inadvertently volunteers to be Junior Vice-Principal. Around Principal Malone, Carl is forced to be a model student, but Tinsley only wants to date a bad boy. When Carl's good boy/bad boy personas start to overlap, he must figure out how to stay out of trouble with Principal Malone, while still impressing Tinsley with his bad behaviour. Meanwhile, Brittany and Jane embark on a new business venture selling scarf-purses to students, only to discover that their product is giving everyone a sore neck.
39	26	"We'll Always Have Detention"	Brian Hartigan	Paul Fox	January 18, 2012
Carl is excited to meet a girl he truly connects with on the new school intranet, but when he gets detention with Brittany and can't make it to their meeting, he sends Porter to cover for him. Much to Carl's surprise, it turns out the mysterious girl is Brittany. Denise mistakenly concludes that Porter is the one who likes Brittany and, thinking he's a bad match, Denise sets out to find a more suitable boyfriend by magically impersonating Brittany and dating various candidates. Meanwhile, Jane realises the only after-school club she's never attended is detention and tries her best to make it in.
40	27	"Greener-Man vs Polluter"	Steve Wright	Ramona Barckert	April 21, 2012
Carl, Porter and Serge aren't enjoying it when Principal Malone assigns them to perform as the school's 'enviro-friendly mascots'. But with a Magic Nod from Porter, things get more exciting – that is, until Carl and Porter discover that Serge has been accidentally transformed into a super-villain, Polluter. When Polluter sets out to ruin Bennett High's Earth Day, Carl and Porter have to stop him and get back the real Serge, before Polluter spreads his waste all over the world! Meanwhile, Jane tries to help Brittany get over her break-up with mega-hunk Callum by going 'green' and abandoning her make-up and cell phone.
41	28	"At Home By Myself... With Carl"	Frank Van Keeken	Paul Fox	May 12, 2012
Carl is surprised when Serge challenges him to The Strongest Man competition, but not as surprised as Serge when Carl beats him thanks to magical strength from Porter. Unfortunately, Carl breaks his leg. He is stuck at home and bored, he asks Porter to gives him a magic set of TV monitors so he can keep up with school. While watching the monitors, Carl is shocked to see Jane witness Porter doing magic. Now it's up to Carl and Porter to keep Jane from exposing Porter's secret. Meanwhile, Denise and Brittany interview Bennett High students and teachers for the video yearbook, and are shocked to learn Serge has given up sports after being defeated by Carl.

=== Season 3 (2012) ===
No. overall	No. in season	Title	Directed by	Written by	Original release date
42	1	"Forget About It"	Mitchell T. Ness	Frank Van Keeken	March 3, 2012
After Porter's magic goes awry, Carl is left in a parallel Bennett High with no memory of his friends. While Porter, Denise and Jane attempt to locate and bring him back, Carl remembers Brittany by her musical locker, Serge by a picture of him in the basketball team, Alex by a sculpture of Carl's own head, and Porter and Denise when he sees the Angel Textbook flying between dimensions. The last person he remembers is Jane thanks to some pictures of the two of them together, which reminds Carl that he still has feelings for Jane. This in turn brings him back, where he remembers one last thing: it's his birthday!
43	2	"Pimento"	Ron Murphy	Brian Hartigan	March 10, 2012
Carl enters a burger eating contest, claiming it's because he's had years of practise on his mom's awful food. He qualifies with ease, but struggles in the final, where Porter's magic gets him disqualified. After Carl shouts at him for his actions, Porter shows him the alternate reality, where Carl wins the contest, but at the price of his friends, leading him to conclude that "Sometimes when you win, you lose". Porter gives him the option of realities, but Carl chooses to lose, but keep his friends. Carl enters the burger eating contest with The Dumpster (played by Jacob Neayem). The Dumpster's little brother, The Trash Can, also makes an appearance in this episode (played by Chris Tarpos).
44	3	"Practical Romance"	Mitchell T. Ness	Roger Fredericks	March 17, 2012
After Carl asks a girl out at school, he wants to make sure that the date is perfect, so he practises with Jane on the basis that they do not have feelings for each other and will therefore be objective. However, the date goes so well that, after Carl and Jane have walked home together, they kiss, much to the confusion and delight of both of them. After the success of his date with Jane, Carl's heart is not really in his date with Sarah, though she enjoys it. Carl knows he likes Jane, and is desperate to show it. At home Porter turns himself to a girl too and he wants to go on a date with Carl.
45	4	"Announce of Prevention"	Kim Derko	Brian Hartigan	March 24, 2012
Carl and Brittany compete to be the official school announcer after both deride Principal Malone's boring style. Brittany's fun way of delivering information beats Carl and Jane's newspaper readings, but Carl asks to be given another chance. He and Porter act out alien invasions to persuade students to study harder, and although Principal Malone fears that this will get him sacked, he is actually made Principal of the Year for his efforts in holding Bennett High together.
46	5	"What I Re-Like About You"	Michael T. Ness	Chloe Van Keeken	March 31, 2012
Jane realises that she has a crush on Carl, but thinks that he has moved on since she rejected him (in Series 2, Episode 13). However, Carl has not moved on, and he is thrilled to learn that Jane still likes him. Both attempt to make the other jealous by going on a double date – Carl with Melissa, and Jane with Serge. While Melissa and Serge take a liking to each other and leave together, Carl and Jane's argument threatens to ruin their chances of a relationship. Meanwhile, Denise has been getting annoyed at hearing nothing from Miss Stern regarding her assignment. Porter convinces her that Miss Stern is going round to Carl's house, but only so that Denise cannot interfere with or be upset by Jane and Carl getting together. However, she figures this out, and upon seeing Jane and Carl's argument, she encourages each of them to tell the other how they feel, bringing Carl and Jane together, and prompting Miss Stern to say that Denise is ready for her assignment.
47	6	"Angel on Hippocampus"	Michael T. Ness	Alex Nussbaum & Rachael Schaefer	April 14, 2012
Jane gets arrested by Agent 45 for being a human with unauthorised knowledge of Angels. Jane must prove her trustworthiness or have her memory removed. She fails in her attempts to convince Agent 45 that she is trustworthy, but still manages to escape thanks to Alex, who is brought up to heaven (though he is told it is Carl's bedroom) to hack the system and change the password. Jane uses this to blackmail her way back to Earth.
48	7	"Cosmonaut Claire 3-D"	Don McCutcheon	Chloe Van Keeken	April 28, 2012
After Carl steps out of line to buy some merchandise with the promise that he will be allowed his space back, he is betrayed and sent to the back of the line with Porter and Jane. Brittany, meanwhile, takes her chance to walk on the red carpet, until she is sent away by a security guard (Colin Mochrie). Note: This episode marks the second time that the events are not set in or around Carl's home and/or Bennett High.
49	8	"Total Debate of the Heart"	Ron Murphy	Claire Ross Dunn	May 5, 2012
When Jane picks Carl over Melissa for the debate team just because they are dating, it proves to be a big mistake. A member of the Terrendale team kisses Carl to create conflict between him and Jane, and they subsequently fail at debating. After realising how much her jealousy ruined their chances, Jane breaks up with Carl. However, Principal Malone stages a debate in front of the whole school on the subject of whether or not they should date, and Carl convinces Jane that they belong together.
50	9	"Flowers for Sergernon"	Don McCutcheon	Roger Fredericks	May 19, 2012
Porter creates a magic pencil for Carl to write in a test with despite his cramped fingers, but Serge steals it off his desk, resulting in Serge scoring 100% and facing expulsion, and Carl scoring only 3%. Serge is ordered to resit the exam, but this time he scores 110%, and it seems that the pencil has made him very clever, and made him much more literate and eloquent. Porter splits Serge into Science Serge and Sports Serge, and as Carl confuses the former, the latter is returned to his sporting, illiterate best.
51	10	"Live and Let Fly"	Derby Crewe	Frank Van Keeken	May 25, 2012
The Prom approaches, and Carl and Jane both ask each other to go. Serge asks Melissa to go with him. He, Carl and Jane learn that Denise is set to be rewarded for her hard work with her AIT assignment. At the prom, time freezes, and angels descend to collect Porter – he has completed his assignment of making Carl the most popular student at Bennett High. The two friends say an emotional farewell as Porter is granted his wings and rises to heaven with the Listern Sisters, who have been Porter's guardian angels the whole time. The confirmation of Carl's popularity is when he is made Prom King (Brittany is Prom Queen). Although tradition dictates that the King and Queen share the first dance, that honour goes to Carl and Jane. As they dance, Carl thanks Porter for everything he has done. In a post-credits scene, Denise is given her assignment which, to her disgust, is Brittany. This is the last episode of the hit Family Channel series.

== Broadcast ==
Wingin' It premiered in 2010, when it was broadcast on the Family Channel in Canada. Family was the only channel to air it until Disney XD started broadcasting it; it then began airing on Family CHRGD on June 1, 2011. The third season has aired in the United Kingdom on CBBC, and started airing in Canada on March 3, 2012. In March 2013, the series began airing in the United States Mondays-Fridays at 7:00 PM. It was also broadcast on TVB Pearl in Hong Kong, airing Mondays-Fridays at 5PM.

Internationally, it has appeared on:

- BBC Two (UK)
- CBBC (UK)
- Disney Channel (Italy)
- Nickelodeon (Flanders, Belgium)
- Nickelodeon (Germany)
- Nickelodeon (Netherlands)
- Gloob (Brazil)
- Teletoon+ (Poland)
- Starz Kids & Family (USA)
- Kidz TV (Turkey)
- SVT (Sweden)
- NRK Super (Norway)
