= List of Connor Undercover episodes =

The following is a list of episodes of the television series Connor Undercover. Connor Undercover was commissioned by Family Channel Canada in 2008 and was filmed in early 2009 in Toronto.

== Series overview ==
Series	Episodes	Originally released	
Series	Episodes	First released	Last released
1	13	9 April 2010	26 April 2010
2	25	11 October 2010	19 February 2011

== Episodes ==
=== Season 1 (2010) ===
No. overall	No. in season	Title	Original release date (ABC3 / Family Channel)
1	1	"Arrival"	9 April 2010 / 17 September 2010
Budding teen spy Connor Heath's dreams of adventure come true when a mysterious foreign girl named Gisela moves in with his family. But when it becomes clear that will do everything in her power to return home, Connor finds himself using all of his spy skills to get her to stay. Good thing too because it looks like Gisela is at the center of a major conspiracy and in more danger than he or she could ever imagine.
2	2	"Proof"	12 April 2010 / 24 September 2010
Gisela and Connor clash: She tries to prove she's unsafe with the Heath family so she can get sent home; he tries to prove his spy skills are the key to her protection so she can stay. But Connor's push to convince Gisela to stay comes up short when she "fires" him as her guide and "hires" his bumbling best friend, Whynot. Things get even worse when Connor accidentally takes down Gisela's bodyguard in a case of mistaken identity. Meanwhile, Ty intercepts a mysterious package in the mail… a package that's full of money.
3	3	"Cover Story"	13 April 2010 / 1 October 2010
It is the first day of school and Gisela pulls out all the stops in her mission to get sent back home to Cordobá. Her goal: get expelled. But her attitude takes a 180 when her new bodyguard – Zatari – comes to town. Thing is, Connor doesn't think Zatari is who she says she is and will do anything – even blow off his major crush, Tanya – to find out what she's hiding.
4	4	"Trash Talk"	14 April 2010 / 8 October 2010
It is boys against the girls as Connor and Whynot go head-to-head with Gisela and Zatari in a high-stakes recycling competition. As reigning recycling champions, the boys figure they're unbeatable but they've never competed against the likes of Gisela before and they're about to get derailed by Connor's growing suspicions that Zatari is an enemy agent. Meanwhile, Ty intercepts a coded message that might be a top-secret enemy transmission – and asks Zatari if she can translate it for him.
5	5	"Stung"	15 April 2010 / 15 October 2010
It is a very strange day – Zatari has disappeared and Tanya has suddenly taken an interest in Connor! In fact, Tanya so interested in him that she tails Connor and Gisela to an abandoned warehouse – the only clue they have to where Zatari might be. Things get even more strange when they stumble upon a wild man trapped inside who turns out to be someone from Gisela's past. Meanwhile, Whynot's band gears up for their first major gig and discovers that they might be cursed!
6	6	"Lockdown"	15 April 2010 / 22 October 2010
There's a new bodyguard in town and he's stepping up security and putting the Heath family under house arrest. As Ed fortifies the family dwelling, Connor and Gisela find themselves getting cabin fever and sneak out to the mall. But things go bad when Ed catches up with them and reveals that he's ready to send Gisela someplace really isolated - for her own good. Connor thinks he can keep Gisela with the Heaths and tip Ed off to what Zatari may have been looking for all along… but it might just cost him any trust Ed still has in him.
7	7	"Lost in Translation"	16 April 2010 / 29 October 2010
Connor and Gisela's prank war has gotten out of hand – he's used the last of her ultra-exotic shower gel and she's dyed his face orange. In "reparation", Gisela offers to give Connor much needed Spanish lessons and, unbeknownst to him, teaches it to him all wrong, never suspecting he'll use his newfound bilingualism to accidentally give the enemy the location of a shipment coming up from Cordobá. The only way to make sure it hasn't been tampered with may be to throw it from the helicopter… and blow it up in mid-air. Meanwhile, Whynot's latest song gives him his first taste of love-struck female fans and it's not at all like he thought it would be.
8	8	"Geolocked"	19 April 2010 / 5 November 2010
When an accidental flood sends the Heath family to live with Ed, Connor seizes the chance to use Ed's gear. But when he realizes that he may have given away Gisela's position to the enemy, he begins to seriously reconsider his spy career. Afraid to tell Ed what he's done, Connor's torn between coming clean and waiting to see if maybe – just maybe – he didn't do what he thinks he did. Meanwhile, Ty concocts a plan to get himself a little room at Ed's and ends up getting sent to Lily's – on slumber party night!
9	9	"Diva"	20 April 2010 / 12 November 2010
Connor's first official mission – help Gisela blend in at school – goes terribly wrong when it arouses Tanya's suspicion about the Heath's "houseguest." The good news is that Tanya thinks Gisela is a South American pop star. The bad news is that she wants Gisela to sing at her benefit concert… and Gisela can't carry a tune in a bucket – not even if it's duct-taped to it. Neither Connor nor Gisela have any ideas how Gisela can avoid expose – or worse: total public humiliation. Who would have thought the answer would end up coming from Ty, who has been scheming to get Gisela-obsessed Lily in trouble.
10	10	"Fashion Crimes"	21 April 2010 / 19 November 2010
Ed's got one directive and one directive only for Connor and Gisela – stick together no matter what! That might be easy for him to say but the kids have other plans. Connor is going to the SpyWorld Expo to see what;s cutting edge in espionage, Gisela is off to help Tanya with the school fashion show, and with Ed out of the way (thanks to the kids' scheming) it should be a piece of cake. That is, until Connor discovers that the town is swarming with paparazzi all there with the hot tip that Gisela Calicos is hiding out somewhere in town. Meanwhile, Tanya is at a loss for a fashion show theme and turns to Whynot for creative advice.
11	11	"Old Flame"	22 April 2010 / 26 November 2010
With the danger level rising, the President decides to relocate Gisela and sends her old crush, Joaquín, to retrieve her. Connor's not going down without a fight, though - he wants Gisela to stay or to be the one who goes with her. But is what Connor wants in Gisela's best interest or is it just sparked by jealousy? Connor soon realizes that, in order to do the right thing, he may have to say good-bye to his best friend.
12	12	"Ed Lite"	23 April 2010 / 3 December 2010
With Ed out of town to testify against Zatari, Gisela's security is entrusted to Jorges Guzman – a.k.a. "Ed Lite" – a.k.a. the most incompetent human being the Heaths have ever met. So, when Connor and Gisela discover the location of an enemy hard-drive containing top-secret info they decide to go after it without him… and find themselves face to face with some very dangerous goons. Meanwhile, Ty is convinced that Ed Lite is an alien and does everything he can to collect the evidence to prove his theory right.
13	13	"Password Protect"	26 April 2010 / 10 December 2010
Everyone's in major trouble. Zatari's back in town and she means business. She's captured Gisela and is threatening to take her away unless Ed makes a video confessing to all of Zatari's crimes! Connor knows he has something that Zatari wants even more than Ed's false confession – the password she's been searching for since Gisela arrived at the Heath's – and that will force him to choose between betraying Gisela's trust or letting Ed destroy his career. Good thing he's got a few tricks up his sleeve…

=== Season 2 (2010–11) ===
No. overall	No. in season	Title	Original release date (ABC3)
14	1	"This Time It's Personal"	11 October 2010
Connor's dream of spy school is as strong as ever, and he is just one final test away from being accepted to Camp X Spy Academy. That is, if he can carry out a covert DNA analysis on his crush, Tanya! While Connor struggles with this difficult task, Gisela struggles to make life in her new home as great as life back in Cordoba. Too bad Ed, her bodyguard, didn't get the memo. His intrusive and embarrassing attempts to watch her undercover at school make 'normal teen life' anything but normal. But Connor and Gisela find even these problems take a back seat when an old enemy comes to call who must be dealt with once and for all.
15	2	"Fake Out"	12 October 2010
Connor begins spy training under Ed who gives him the near-impossible test of adopting a disguise so convincing that it even fools Whynot, his best friend. With Gisela's help, Connor becomes "Desmond," an upper crust snob with a taste for fashion. But when his alter ego uncovers some shocking information, Connor can't disguise his amazement. Meanwhile, Lily tricks Ty into taking a lame-o microwave cooking class with her. Can Ty bend the rules (and recipes) to have fun anyway?
16	3	"Background Check"	13 October 2010
Tanya and Dillon have broken up and Connor sees his chance to win her over. With Gisela's help, he uses his spy gadgets to get dating intel on Tanya and dirt on Dillon. But before he can make his move to impress Tanya, the enemy comes to call. Will Connor be able to win Tanya away from annoying and possibly evil Dillon? He's going to have to find her first.
17	4	"Whack-a-Mole"	14 October 2010
Ed tests Connor's spy skills by planting a mole in their midst. Connor knows that his future as Gisela's bodyguard is riding on this, so he pulls out all the stops investigating everyone in the same area code – which is as hard as it sounds, especially when Gisela's being weirdly unhelpful. But Connor's thoroughness pays off when he uncovers a threat nobody else even noticed. Meanwhile, Gisela's neighbour, Lily, pulls out all the stops to get Gisela to go on a ski trip with her.
18	5	"Hard Candy"	15 October 2010
Whatever differences Connor and Gisela may have, one thing they have in common is a quite-possibly-too-healthy spirit of competition. That's why a little trash talk between the two of them erupts into a full-on battle over who can figure out a communications device that Ed took from an enemy agent. But when Ty wanders cluelessly onto their battlefield, everything changes, and there's a lot more than bragging rights at stake. Meanwhile, Lily thinks Ty can't go a day without eating candy. And she's right.
19	6	"Secrets and Lies"	18 October 2010
Gisela's attempts to jumpstart her lovelife prove futile until a new guy shows up at school. He's cute, he's worldly, and he's just what the Gisela ordered. But Connor is suspicious, and possibly a little jealous, of perfect Andre, and he has just the way to check him out – with a portable lie detection device from Ed. Though the device may prove Andre to be trustworthy, Connor's gut disagrees. Connor feels Andre is hiding something. And when Connor and Gisela discover what it is, they're going to have to do some fancy footwork if Gisela wants to date Andre. Meanwhile, Ty looks to Whynot for help when he and Lily must dance together in gym.
20	7	"Crash Course"	19 October 2010
When a helicopter shows up at the Heath house, Connor and Gisela couldn't be more excited - because whoever does the best at copter training gets the bird for the day. For Connor that means a day of stunt-flying and for Gisela that means getting away to an exotic beach to spend time with Andre. But Connor's spy life gets in the way of his school life and soon he's grounded til he pulls his grades up! Looks like Gisela is going to have all the fun and Connor's going to be toga-deep in a Greek Theater extra credit report… unless the enemy has something to say about it. Meanwhile, Ty and Mom compete in a game of extreme hide 'n' seek to determine who will do Ty's chores.
21	8	"Escape Artist"	20 October 2010
When a master spy nicknamed "The Magician" escapes custody, Connor and Gisela pick the wrong time to accidentally handcuff themselves together into an awkward, slow-moving, teenaged mess. While Ed does his best to subdue the escape artist, Connor and Gisela struggle to get out of their unfashionable bracelets to no avail. And when the Magician comes to call, will they be able to figure out how to use their too-close-for-comfort situation to their advantage… somehow? Meanwhile, all this talk about escape artistry gives Ty an idea about taking up magic – so he can make Lily disappear. And it works! A little too well.
22	9	"Fear Itself"	21 October 2010
When a letter from enemy mastermind, Azul, shows up on Gisela's bedroom floor, Connor checks out this huge security breach and is pretty certain that Gisela's boyfriend, Andre, has something to do with it. Sure he's wrong and that he's not listening to her, Gisela takes her protection into her own hands. Now it's up to Connor to team up with Andre to keep Gisela safe. Meanwhile, Ty's April Fool's prank turns Mom and Dad against each other. It is a war that will not end well… for anybody!
23	10	"Dead Drop"	22 October 2010
When Connor finally snags that elusive date with Tanya, it's a case of seriously bad timing when Ed gives him a mission that just can't wait. Gisela's got his back though, and makes it her own mission to help Connor speed through his work. Unfortunately, Gisela's "help" has the opposite effect, and what should have been a fairly straightforward operation goes off the rails and vital info gets into the hands of a master spy. Meanwhile, Lily's deep understanding of romantic melodrama (gleaned from watching telenovellas) comes in handy on her "mission" to keep Tanya from giving up on Connor.
24	11	"Dinner is Ruined"	25 October 2010
With the enemy stepping things up, security on Gisela goes up too, which means no social life for anybody. Gisela chafes at having to miss a dinner engagement at Tanya's house until Connor intervenes, convincing Ed that he can protect her personally for this one important event. But Connor's not just being altruistic; he wants some face-time with his crush! But guarding Gisela proves to be harder than anyone thought. Who will be the casualty? Gisela, Ed… or Connor's lovelife…? Meanwhile, Ty and Lily bond when they get locked in Connor's forbidden spy pod together.
25	12	"Stop Bugging Me"	26 October 2010
High school gossip does what the best enemy agents couldn't: throw Connor off his game. Rumour has it, Connor likes Gisela, and she likes him right back! But the timing couldn't be worse. There's a high-tech bug in their midst, and Connor and Gisela need to work together to find it. With the awkwardness meter off the charts and the enemy a step ahead, can Connor get his head back in the game? Meanwhile, Ty becomes a tycoon when the household bug search uncovers a gold mine of valuable odds and ends.
26	13	"Rogue"	27 October 2010
Ed puts Connor through a series of time-consuming spy tests – why? Connor doesn't know, but he hopes it means a promotion is coming. Meanwhile, Ed cavalierly sends Gisela off on a date with Andre with no warnings, caveats or special protection to speak of. Weird! In fact, it's so weird that Connor thinks he should try to get to the bottom of it. And what he discovers is so shocking that he and Gisela can't actually believe it. But one thing is for certain: everything is about to change.
27	14	"Spies vs. Spies"	16 January 2011
Connor learns that Ed's top secret mission is in trouble and the President's men are after him. Only Connor can help Ed now, but does he have what it takes to out-agent every agent on the case? Caught between his duty to the President and his loyalty to a friend, Connor will need Gisela's help to untangle this situation. Ty, on the other hand, is making the best of Ed's absence by converting his bungalow into his very own "man cave."
28	15	"Deadly Lipgloss"	
Connor's excitement over the arrival of new secret service spy gadget quickly fades when it turns out to be – lipgloss? There's obviously been some kind of mistake at HQ, but while Connor is busy trying to sort it out, he runs into bigger problems. Jorge, the inept but lucky agent running the investigation into Ed's recent actions, leaves both Gisela and the dangerous-but-harmless-looking gadget unprotected at school. Will Connor be able to chase down the hazardous cosmetic before some unsuspecting girl gets hurt? And will Gisela be able to keep Jorge from walking into even more trouble with enemy agents?
29	16	"Damage Control"	23 January 2011
It is bad enough that Gisela and Connor always have to double date so that Connor can protect Gisela, but to have to babysit Jorge, an inept agent, at the same time and keep him out of danger til his flight out of town? That's asking a lot. Too much, as it turns out. When Jorge gets into a world of trouble, Connor and Gisela must ditch their annoyed dates and take care of spy-business. Will Connor and Gisela be able to save Jorge – and their relationships – before it is too late?
30	17	"The Ticking House"	23 January 2011
When Mom and Dad leave town, Connor and Gisela throw a much-needed party. What could go possibly wrong? Well, they could accidentally set the high-tech house to 'self-destruct'. Faced with a tick-tick-ticking house and enemy leader Azul's men on the way to collect the rubble, Connor and Gisela need a new party plan, fast. Will they find a solution before the house goes kaboom? Meanwhile, Ty and Lily blend into the party by going undercover... disguised as teenagers.
31	18	"The Key"	25 January 2011
When Connor overhears enemy chatter about searching for a key somewhere among Gisela's possessions, he realises they better find it before the bad guys do.
32	19	"003rd Wheel"	26 January 2011
If Connor can't flush out an enemy agent in time, Gisela will have to cancel her big date with Andre. Luckily, the job turns out to be easy as Connor discovers the agent in an unlikely place - right under his nose!
33	20	"Betrayals"	27 January 2011
Gisela eagerly awaits a secret visit from her father, the President of Cordoba, when Ed unexpectedly returns from his undercover mission badly hurt and with devastating news - someone in the secret service is a mole!
34	21	"The Eye of Cordoba"	28 January 2011
With an escaped enemy agent on the loose, Connor's got his hands too full to worry about Gisela lovelife - or lack thereof. Meanwhile, Ty and Mom join forces to rid the family of Dad's awful sweat pants.
35	22	"The Pod Couple"	29 January 2011
While Connor and Gisela fight over the fate of one of Gisela's most prized - but most dangerous possessions, competition and trickery soon take a back seat to a much bigger problem - a threat coming from inside the house!
36	23	"Home Scary Home"	30 January 2011
A holiday in Cordoba takes a dangerous turn when Connor discovers the enemy's lair. Gisela tries to have fun in the sun, but soon discovers that Connor is in trouble.
37	24	"If You Could Read My Mind"	31 January 2011
Still in Cordoba, Connor and Gisela spy their way into the safe that the enemy wants making them find exactly what Azul has been after!
38	25	"See You There"	19 February 2011
With Connor and Gisela back in Connor's house and school things take a turn for the worse when Sophia goes prying into Gisela's things to get Connor for herself. But Sophia goes to far and puts Gisela right into the enemys hands! Will Gisela and Connor beat Azul or will he win?
