= Demetrius Joyette =

Canadian actor

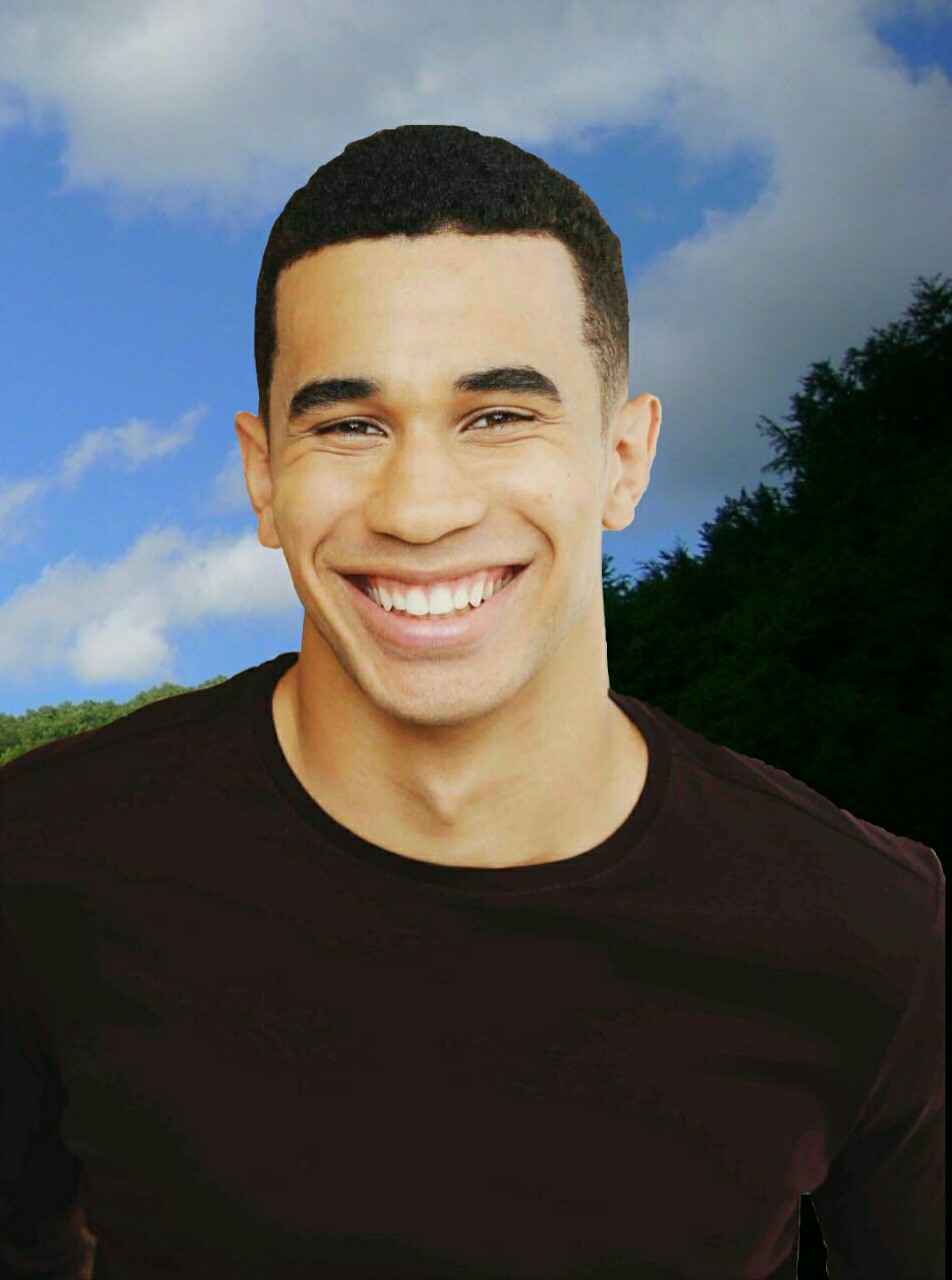
- Born: March 14, 1993 (age 33); Toronto, Ontario, Canada
- Occupation: Actor
- Years active: 2001–present

Demetrius Joyette (born March 14, 1993) is a Canadian actor best known for portraying the role of Michael Theodore Davies in the sitcom The Latest Buzz, Porter Jackson on Wingin' It and Mike Dallas in Degrassi: The Next Generation.

== Early life ==
Joyette was born in Toronto, Ontario, Canada.

== Career ==
Joyette made his television debut on the American medical drama Doc as Justin in 2001. The role earned him two nominations at the Young Artist Awards in 2002 and 2003. He made his film debut in the LeVar Burton's Christmas film Blizzard (2003).

In 2010, starred as angel-in-training Porter Jackson in children's show Wingin' It.

From 2012 to 2015, Joyette starred as the hockey star and teen father, Mike Dallas, in the teen drama series Degrassi: The Next Generation.

In 2013, he had a small role as George Dawson in the supernatural horror remake Carrie.

== Filmography ==
=== Film ===
Year	Title	Role	Notes
2003	Blizzard	Bobby	
2003	Owning Mahowny	Boy	
2005	The Pacifier	First Junior Grizzly	
2005	Mind Me Good Now		Short film
2013	Carrie	George Dawson	
2022	Text Me Back	Levi	Short film; Writer & Director

=== Television ===
Year	Title	Role	Notes	Ref
2001–2004	Doc	Justin	28 episodes	
2004	Wonderfalls	Shoplift Boy	Episode: "Caged Bird"	
2005	Murdoch Mysteries	Freddie	Episode: "Under the Dragon's Tail"	
2005	Kojak	Darryl Harris	Episode: "Pilot"	
2005	Darcy's Wild Life	Colt Brewster	3 episodes	
2005	Cyber Seduction: His Secret Life		Television film	
2006-2008	Captain Flamingo	Rutger	5 episodes	
2007	Super Why!	Peter Piper	2 episodes	
2007	Roxy Hunter and the Mystery of the Moody Ghost	Max	Television film	
2007-2008	Little Mosque on the Prairie	Jemal Dinssa	4 episodes	
2007–2010	The Latest Buzz	Michael Theodore Davies	Main role	
2008	Roxy Hunter and the Secret of the Shaman	Max	Television film	
2008	Roxy Hunter and the Myth of the Mermaid	Max	Television film	
2008	Roxy Hunter and the Horrific Halloween	Max	Television film	
2010	What's Up Warthogs!	Henry Davidson		
2010	Wingin' It	Porter Jackson	Main role	
2011-2012	Totally Amp'd	Brando		
2012–2015	Degrassi	Mike Dallas	Main role	
2015	NCIS	Marine Lance Corporal Jonathan Zee	Episode: "Incognito"	
2017	The Real O'Neals	Barista	Episode: "The Real Confirmation"	
2020	The Expanding Universe of Ashley Garcia	Eric	Episode: "Failure is Not an Option"	

== Awards and nominations ==
Year	Award	Category	Nominated work	Result	Ref.
2002	Young Artist Awards	Best Performance in a TV Series (Comedy or Drama): Young Actor Age 10 or Under	Doc	Nominated	
2003	Young Artist Awards	Best Performance in a TV Series (Comedy or Drama): Young Actor Age 10 or Under	Doc	Nominated	
2005	Young Artist Awards	Best Young Ensemble Performance in a TV Series (Comedy or Drama)	Darcy's Wild Life	Nominated	
2006	Young Artist Awards	Best Young Ensemble Performance in a TV Series (Comedy or Drama)	Darcy's Wild Life	Nominated	
