= Captain Flamingo =

Canadian-Philippine animated series

- Lizbeth (left) and Milo, in the season one episode "Snot Funny"
- Genre: Superhero; Fantasy; Comedy
- Created by: Suzanne Bolch; John May
- Based on: "Captain Flamingo", an episode from Deke Wilson's Mini-Mysteries by John May
- Developed by: Kevin Gillis; Rob Davies; Bonita Siegel
- Written by: Suzanne Bolch; John May; Kenn Scott; Christin Simms; Shelley Hoffman; Robert Pincombe
- Voices of: Tabitha St. Germain; Melanie Tonello; Scott Beaudin; Sugar Lyn Beard; Cole Caplan; Stacey DePass
- Narrated by: Peter Keleghan
- Theme music composer: Angie Grant; Jono Grant; Zoe Grant
- Opening theme: "Captain Flamingo" by Angle Grant; Jono Grant; Zoe Grant
- Ending theme: "Captain Flamingo" (instrumental)
- Composer: Jono Grant
- Countries of origin: Canada; Philippines
- Original language: English
- No. of seasons: 3
- No. of episodes: 52 (103 segments)

Production
- Executive producers: Kevin Gills; Ira Levy; Peter Williamson; Karen Lee Hall; Suzanne Bolch; John May; Trevor Bentley; Frank Saperstein (S1); Mimbi Eloriaga; Jun Camerino (S3)
- Producers: Rob Davies; Karen Lee Hall; Lani Barcelona (S1–2); Kevin Gillis; Eliza Tamayo (S3)
- Running time: 22 minutes
- Production companies: Atomic Cartoons (Note: As Captain Flamingo Productions (BC) Inc. for season 1, Captain Flamingo Productions 2 (BC) Inc. for season 2, and Captain Flamingo Productions 3 (BC) Inc. for season 3); Breakthrough Films & Television (Note: As Flamingo Productions Inc. for season 1, Flamingo 2 Productions Inc., and Flamingo 3 Productions Inc. for season 3.); Heroic Film Company; Philippine Animation Studio Inc.

Original release
- Network: YTV (Canada); GMA Network (Philippines)
- Release: February 7, 2006 – December 19, 2010

Captain Flamingo is a Canadian animated superhero comedy television series produced by Breakthrough Films & Television, Heroic Film Company, Atomic Cartoons, and PASI Animation Studios. Loosely based on the Deke Wilson's Mini-Mysteries spin-off episode (of the same name) by John May (which originally was going to be a 1990s live-action teen series focusing only on Arthur), it premiered on YTV on February 7, 2006, and ended on December 19, 2010.

== Plot ==
Milo Powell is an ordinary young Japanese-Canadian boy, living in Halverston-in-Area (a fictional neighbourhood in Toronto, Ontario) until a kid is in trouble. Any time a kid yells "Uh-oh! Flamingo!", Milo transforms into Captain Flamingo, whose mission is to help little kids who need assistance. Captain Flamingo is aided in his missions by his best friend Lizbeth Amanda Zaragoza, who apparently has a not-so-secret crush on him. CF also has a little brother named Thor.

Quite often, when called upon to carry out a mission, Captain Flamingo is busily engaged with something else, a personal goal or problem (such as waiting in line to buy an ice cream before the truck leaves or runs out of ice cream, but someone calls to him, needing his help); like a true hero, he must, and usually does, put aside his own needs to help others (although, quite often, his actions in successfully aiding the person in distress lead to a successful outcome for his personal goals). Captain Flamingo seldom successfully solves a problem on his first try; in fact, it is not uncommon for his initial attempts to make things worse. In trying to solve the simple problems of other little kids he encounters (such as, say, a lost pencil or a missing sock), Captain Flamingo often gets into tight spots. He has, in various episodes, gotten trapped in a bubble with a full bladder (Water You Worried About?), gone underwater to battle an eel (Sink or Swim), and got trapped in a deadly matrix of bouncing superballs (Ball of Confusion). Despite this, he never gives up and meets every failure or setback with a new attempt. He eventually gets out of these situations by using his "Bird Brain"; this can be his own instincts, but it usually is Lizbeth. A random thought he speaks aloud might be picked up on by Lizbeth and elaborated into an actual, detailed plan (which Lizbeth will assume was what Captain Flamingo planned to do all along), or he can assume that a suggestion spoken aloud by Lizbeth is his "Bird Brain" speaking to him (although he usually misinterprets her suggestion; however, his misinterpretation usually works). In the end, Captain Flamingo always seems to stumble upon a solution either through Lizbeth's cleverness, persistent refusal to give up, and constantly trying new novelty items and plans until he succeeds, or sheer luck (or, quite often, some combination of the three).

== Characters ==
=== Main ===
- Milo Powell/Captain Flamingo: (voiced by Tabitha St. Germain) Motivated, driven Milo Powell is equipped with the imagination and faith to become a superhero. He stands proudly in his homemade super-tights, his unwieldy flamingo-beak helmet, and terry cloth cape, ready to take on an outsized world! With Milo, things rarely turn out as planned, but somehow they do always manage to turn out all right. He carries a heavy heroic burden because kids everywhere rely on him, so he approaches their problems with utmost seriousness—as if the fate of their world depended on it (and maybe it does!). In the episode "Switch Hitch", where Wendell and Milo switched lives, Milo seemed quite jealous of Wendell's feelings towards Lizbeth. It is later revealed that he may love her. When Lizbeth and the rest of his friends were walking away with an imposter in that episode, he shouted "Lizbeth, I love you-I mean how you...". He was also impersonated in "Captain Copycat" by the Warrior Monkey (Milo managed to counter the incident by impersonating the Warrior Monkey). He is a Lemming Scout, a fan of horror movies, and can understand animal languages. The titular character is of unspecified age. Captain Flamingo has no notable superpowers, just a desire to help "li'l kids" in trouble. His "superpowers" take the form of novelty items, such as a whoopee cushion. During production, he was going to be a teenager named Arthur (who is the main sidekick of the titular character in Deke Wilson's Mini-Mysteries) when it was first conceived as a live-action spin-off that aimed towards a teen audience then Milo Howell during the later animated pilot.
- Lizbeth Amanda Zaragoza: (voiced by Melanie Tonello) The Captain's best friend, sidekick, and not-so-secret admirer. She is a girl of Chinese-Filipino Canadian descent. Lizbeth is focused and organized, however, she is just a puddle of emotions when it comes to Milo Powell, her favourite square-shaped boy. She is a devoted follower and chronicler of his heroics, and, unbeknownst to him, is the voice of the "birdbrain" that often inspires the Captain to save the day. Lizbeth is strong and smart but a bit of a loner because of it. Her best friend, besides Milo, is her monocled stuffed elephant confidante, Chester. Lizbeth is secure in the knowledge that girls mature faster than boys, so she knows one day Milo will catch up and appreciate her. So, for now, she is willing to guide him along and wait patiently for that special day. She acts so because Milo saved her life when they were babies when Lizbeth nearly fell out of the sandbox onto the concrete sidewalk and Milo threw himself in front of her to save her, and never forgets about it (although witnesses say that what really happened was that Milo became distracted by a butterfly, and, unable to concentrate and keep himself up at the same time, fell into a heap, unintentionally saving her). She has a sneezing allergy to several animals and plants, according to "Rare Basement Window".
- Thor Powell: (voiced by Nissae Isen) Thor is Milo's diaper-clad baby brother. Thor likes to crawl after Milo and ride his cape. And he likes to slobber on Milo's tights. As Thor's primary babysitter, Milo often has to juggle his younger brother and his work—sometimes literally.
- Margerie Powell: (voiced by Kathy Greenwood) Milo's Japanese mother has her own life as an ornithologist. She loves her boys, but adult schedules and family events come first before little kids' desires. She is very huggy and supportive, but also extremely practical and firm. If she has said 'no' twice, Milo knows asking a third time would be foolhardy. Her first name was revealed to be Margerie by a young Mr. Powell in the episode. She is also the daughter of a Canadian Security Intelligence Service (RCMP Security Service back in the 1980s) agent.
- David Ignacius Powell: (voiced by Richard Waugh) Deadpan, monotone, and humourless, Milo's father ironically runs a humour and novelty store where Milo gets his joke products from. With a voice that borders on deep-funereal, David is still somehow a warm guy, despite his overall stiffness. His full name was revealed in the episode "Fault Line" by Milo's mother.
- Kirsten McBradden (voiced by Stephanie Beard) - Kirsten is a red-headed sweet Irish Canadian girl who really believes in Captain Flamingo and is even doing a project on him for school and once became the subject of a play where only he had speaking lines. She asks him all sorts of fangirl questions, always proceeded by, "I was just wondering...", and like Lizbeth, she has a huge crush on Milo and often concocts fake troubles to get Milo to "rescue" her and to possibly spend time with him. Her crush on Milo seems to border a bit on the psychotic and Milo seems more aware of her crush than he is of Lizbeth's. Her last name was revealed to be McBradden in the episode "Bug Out".
- Max Roderick (voiced by Isabel de Carteret) - Max is one of the smartest, most sophisticated kids on the block (who is of English Canadian descent). It is not his fault he is two feet tall and has a ridiculous Elmer Fudd or Tweety-like (a reference to Looney Tunes characters) speech problem where his r's turn into w's, and he often adds w's to his l's. Therefore, 'really' becomes 'reawwy' and 'small' becomes 'smawl.' Luckily, Captain Flamingo gets him out of trouble. A lot. Max reveals his last name is Roderick in the episode "Max Invader, Scourge Of The Universe". Also in that episode, he has his own alter ego, "Max Invader". He is known to make pretty good voice impressions.
- Rutger (voiced by Demetrius Joyette) - Rutger is an Afro-Brazilian Canadian kid, who always bites off more than he can chew. He is excitable, somewhat like a puppy, and has no lack of confidence. But with his maverick demeanour, he is always getting himself into trouble by taking stuff on before he is ready or big enough to do it. For instance, rather than ride a dumb little dinghy in the wading pool, he'll construct a massive Titanic-like behemoth out of random floatie toys—only to have it sink dramatically, with him on board. The only kid who thinks as big as he does is the Captain; a good thing, as Rutger frequently requires his services. Rutger is a goalie in one of Halverston-in-Area's hockey teams.
- Wendell Howell (voiced by Cole Caplan) - Wendell is Milo's cousin and nemesis. He and Milo are always competing against each other. Wendell loves to point out how much better he is than Milo at everything (due mostly to the fact that he is, as he never lets Milo forget, an eighth of an inch taller than Milo, but that is the only way he is superior to him). A bit of a geek, Wendell always looks for a mathematical or scientific way to gain the upper hand over Milo. He later invents his own superheroic alter ego, Commander Whooping Crane (He chose this name because Whooping Cranes are taller than Flamingos by a good eighth of an inch) who almost replaced Milo as the neighbourhood hero until he got into trouble and had to be saved by CF. In the episode "Switch Hitch", where Milo and Wendell switched lives, Wendell seemed to have feelings for Lizbeth. However, these feelings were not given back. Wendell's last name is revealed to be Howell in "Scrambled Legs". In the episode "Beach Blanket Flamingo", he has a fear of animal fluids when he shrieks after seeing seagull poop.
- Owen-Only: (voiced by Scott Beaudin) Owen is the sole overprotective Cuban Canadian kid. He has been padded, helmeted, and parentally locked out of most of the thrills of being a kid. And pop-culturally, he is way behind. This character has never tasted junk food, felt the wind in his hair while riding his scooter, or told a joke where the punch line was "poo." As a result, he does not get jokes, and states the obvious, to the point of being annoying to other characters. Sugar makes Owen extremely hyperactive; his personality goes from sensible to lunatic if he gets even a taste of sugar.
- Avi (voiced by Matthew Ferguson) - Avi, aka 'The Avalanche Kid' is an American Canadian kid that has a real knack for disaster. Is it a bad moon that hangs over his head or just the overlong bangs that hang in his eyes? Whatever the cause, Avi is seriously dexterity-challenged. All it takes from him is one "uh-oh" move to start an inevitable chain of mounting disasters. Captain Flamingo does not mind cleaning up Avi's messes, usually, but sometimes he wishes Avi would plan and call ahead, because if he is going with his mother to the china shop on Monday, Milo really should book the week off. Avi has three identical-looking younger sisters, who seem to have inherited Avi's ability to be a walking disaster, which also seems to run in his family.
- Tabitha (voiced by Rebecca Brenner) - Tabitha is a French Canadian girl who has two settings: freaked out, and really freaked out. She is on life's fast track; every moment of every day is scheduled, and she plans to finish university and have an established medical career by the time most of us are just finishing breakfast. Tabitha's many playdates, lessons, and various 'opportunities for growth' keep her busy, frazzled, and close to implosion. But when someone's life moves as fast as hers does, things eventually slip—and the Captain is always there to pick up the pieces. Her dirty blonde frizzy hair is a simple indicator of her stress level. The more stressed she is, the wilder it gets - much to her dismay. She has a brother who loves drums and a toddler brother named Tucker who is into streaking!
- Otto (voiced by Catherine Disher) - Otto is a Hungarian Canadian teen could well be a genius....or he could be a complete wacko. We'll only know for sure after he has grown up. But for now, he builds robots that go bad, constructs alternate universes that spin out of his control, and collects rocks that include most of the planet's ore supply. But the Captain saves Otto frequently and unquestioningly—and might even consider him his favourite customer. Otto has a crush on Tabitha, but unfortunately, she finds him disgusting due to his bad habit of nose-picking.
- Sanjay (voiced by Stacey DePass) - Easily distracted, Sanjay is an Indian Canadian kid voted "Most likely to walk into a tree while following a bird call," or "Most likely to trip into a manhole while reading and jogging at the same time." In fact, he may not even notice that he is in the middle of being saved by the fearless yet focused Captain. He has nyctophobia.
- Ruth-Ann (voiced by Annick Obonsawin) - Ruth is Lizbeth's doppelganger-like rival (who is a quarter Italian, Maltese, Kyrgyz and Tajik Canadian); her blonde hair (as a result of her European genetics) is even parted on the opposite side of Lizbeth. Where Lizbeth is spunky, Ruth is a shrinking violet. Where Lizbeth is straightforward, Ruth is the queen of the backhanded compliment. Worse yet, Ruth has Milo wrapped around her finger, and she strings him along like she does all the other boys in town. Ruth makes Lizbeth seethe, and more than once Lizbeth has voted not to rescue her nemesis because Lizbeth knows if Ruth runs off with Milo's heart, she'll just break it. So she fights Ruth for her square-shaped boy every time. She is the most popular girl at school (but not popular in all of Halverston-in-Area) and tells people what is hot and what is not and has telekinetic powers. She wants to be an actress.

=== Recurring ===
- Mth Greegron Ifsqamineus Rasitrkk (voiced by Julie Lemieux) - Mth is a kid from an unknown country who calls Captain Flamingo over so he can help find the Globnick which means a friend (because he and his family cannot speak English). Captain Flamingo befriends Mth in "The Globnick".
- Thrasher (voiced by Noam Zylberman) - Thrasher is an Inuk kid who calls Captain Flamingo for help so he finds his missing electric guitar in "Flamingopalooza".
- Warrior Monkey (voiced by Juan Chioran) - Warrior Monkey is a former circus monkey who turned evil after his abandonment in a pet shop. He blamed Captain Flamingo for all of his problems.
- Jennifer (voiced by Stacey DePass) - Jennifer is a Arab Canadian girl who is the most popular in all of Halverston-in-Area and Toronto as a whole.
- Quantum Vigilante - Milo's favourite superhero and inspiration.

== Episodes ==
Season	Episodes	Originally released	
Season	Episodes	First released	Last released
1	26	February 7, 2006	January 8, 2007
2	13	February 18, 2007	September 9, 2007
3	13	January 13, 2008	December 19, 2010

=== Pilot (2004) ===
Milo Howell transforms into Captain Flamingo to help a kid get a lollipop by scaring the big kids away with rubber fake vomit.

=== Season 1 (2006–07) ===
No.	Title	Canadian air date (YTV)	U.S. air date (Toon Disney/Jetix)	Prod. code
1a	"The Flamingo Has Landed"	February 7, 2006	January 28, 2008	101
A visit to his favourite comic book store convinces Milo Powell to become Captain Flamingo, superhero and defender of little kids everywhere.
1b	"Pancake Panic"	February 7, 2006	January 28, 2008	101
Milo's visit to his favourite breakfast restaurant to try the new adult-sized portion of banana nut pancakes is interrupted by a rampaging monkey aka the Warrior Monkey that attacked Rutger.
2a	"Sink or Swim"	February 14, 2006	January 29, 2008	102
Milo must brave the mysterious deep end of the pool to retrieve little Max's bathing suit while wearing his protective (yet itchy) wool sweater made by his grandma.
2b	"Basement of Yuck"	February 14, 2006	January 29, 2008	102
Milo's music recital plans are put on hold when Max loses his baseball mitt in the basement which is also home to a big, scary female spider!
3a	"I Scream, You Scram!"	February 18, 2006	January 30, 2008	103
Milo's plan to buy ice cream is put on hold when Owen goes flying past on rollerblades.
3b	"Ball of Confusion"	February 18, 2006	January 30, 2008	103
Due to a malfunction, a machine spits out a super ball with such force that it forms a matrix that traps kids, and Milo and Lizbeth have to stop the machine before it breaks.
4a	"Beyond the Thundermonkey Dome"	March 5, 2006	January 31, 2008	104
The Warrior Monkey is giving wedgies to several residents of Halverston (and the rest of Toronto) and Milo and Lizbeth must bring Thor (Milo's younger brother) for a diaper change.
4b	"Gum Control"	March 5, 2006	January 31, 2008	104
Kirsten blows a too-big bubble-gum bubble and pops after being distracted by a butterfly. Milo and Lizbeth must free Kirsten before she is stuck to a surface and find the models of Super Slackers in order to beat Wendell for the most cards collected.
5a	"Water You Worried About?"	March 7, 2006	February 1, 2008	105
Milo has to pee after he drank too much root beer. However, he and Lizbeth must help Rutger who is struggling to wrestle a water hose.
5b	"Portrait of a Superhero (Superhero as A Young Flamingo in some countries)"	March 7, 2006	February 1, 2008	105
Milo has to stay clean for a family portrait while finding Avi's underwear after a laundry accident.
6a	"Ack! Give My Backpack Back, Jack"	March 28, 2006	February 4, 2008	106
A band of squirrels residing in Rutger's treehouse stole Milo's backpack and Milo must borrow Lizbeth's backup.
6b	"Appointment Terror! (Attack of the Girl Next Door in some countries)"	March 28, 2006	February 4, 2008	106
Milo helps Tabitha find her electronic calendar. Milo and Lizbeth must do it quickly as their favourite movie (Attack of the Common Houseplants) is about to end soon.
7a	"Run Milo Run"	April 11, 2006	February 5, 2008	108
Milo and Wendell compete in the Lemming Scouts Obstacle Course. However, during the obstacle course, Sanjay is stuck in the mud.
7b	"Blizzard of Ooze"	April 11, 2006	February 5, 2008	108
Milo is to send Dashrag to the vet. However, Avi is struck by a bread-like substance. If Milo and Lizbeth do not save Avi in time, Avi's mom will be the next victim of the substance.
8a	"The Best Episode Ever"	April 18, 2006	February 6, 2008	109
Milo must get the VCR fixed after Thor accidentally puts a Pop-Tart in it. Meanwhile, Otto accidentally threw Tabitha's pencil in the ceiling. Milo and Lizbeth have to assist Tabitha and Otto to get Tabitha's pencil back.
8b	"Charge It"	April 18, 2006	February 6, 2008	109
Milo's shopping for new school clothes has a nightmare when Owen gets stuck in a turtleneck sweater.
9a	"Ten Pin Peril"	April 25, 2006	February 7, 2008	107
Ruth is trapped in bowling machinery after she mistakenly wears bowling shoes that are not the size of her feet. Milo and Lizbeth must save her while trying to expose Wendell as a cheater at bowling.
9b	"Whack-a-Max"	April 25, 2006	February 7, 2008	107
While Milo is giving Ruth a gift, Max falls into a Whack-a-Mole type game. He and Lizbeth must save Max or he will get injured by a mallet.
10a	"Cheese the Day"	May 2, 2006	February 8, 2008	110
Milo runs out of processed cheese at home and Max needs to have his order fulfilled in a restaurant.
10b	"Beach Blanket Flamingo"	May 2, 2006	February 8, 2008	110
Milo and Lizbeth must save Owen from seagulls while participating in the sandcastle building contest with Wendell.
11a	"A Fish Called Milo"	May 14, 2006	February 11, 2008	111
Milo accidentally let the cat out and can't find her. He and Lizbeth must help Owen to tell Mrs. Only to stop giving Owen too much fish oil.
11b	"High and Flighty"	May 14, 2006	February 11, 2008	111
Milo and Lizbeth enter a kite-flying contest while finding Rutger's dad's baseball.
12a	"Much Ado About a 'Do'"	May 21, 2006	February 12, 2008	112
Milo and Lizbeth must stop a barber before Ruth gets a bad haircut.
12b	"Talking to Ralph on the Big Porcelain Phone"	May 21, 2006	February 12, 2008	112
A long drive has left Milo carsick. Unfortunately, he and Lizbeth must save Rutger from yellow water.
13a	"Snot Funny"	May 26, 2006	February 13, 2008	113
Milo must battle through a congestive flu bug to help Mth who got lost in a supermarket.
13b	"Flowers, and Candy"	May 26, 2006	February 13, 2008	113
Milo's Mother's Day gift for his mom does not go as planned after Owen suffered a sugar rush.
14a	"Alien Avalanche"	June 4, 2006	February 14, 2008	114
Milo and Lizbeth's garage sale interrupted by an alien (which is just Avi with his face stuck in a fishbowl).
14b	"Thor All Over"	June 4, 2006	February 14, 2008	114
Thor borrows the Captain Flamingo outfit to assist his brother Milo's mission that involves trying to cure Rutger of hiccups.
15a	"Milo and the Gang Face More Problems"	June 25, 2006	February 15, 2008	115
Milo loses the ring for his aunt's wedding and must stop Avi before he destroys the power plant.
15b	"The Even Greater Escape"	June 25, 2006	February 15, 2008	115
Milo must help Rutger escape from Megan (Halverston's only babysitter) to play hockey.
16a	"The Last Stand"	July 30, 2006	February 18, 2008	116
Milo can't wait to eat his super sour lemon suckers but he and Lizbeth must help Kirsten and her lemonade stand win more customers from Wendell.
16b	"Fifty Ways to Leave Your Liver"	July 30, 2006	February 18, 2008	116
Milo has to escape from his mother, who wants him to eat liver to remind Tabitha's brother that his sister is studying.
17a	"Bunny Run"	August 6, 2006	February 25, 2008	117
While waiting for the new Reversible Power Drill Ride, Max accidentally lets a bunny escape from the petting zoo, and Milo and Lizbeth must save the bunny.
17b	"Tape That!"	August 6, 2006	February 25, 2008	117
Milo and Lizbeth have to save Rutger from interrogation for returning a video late. Milo must also stop his mom from asking for copies of his baby videos.
18a	"Play on Words"	August 27, 2006	April 8, 2008	118
Rutger asks for help to remember the lines for the play that he is starring in and Milo must be trained to be tough for this situation.
18b	"Present Tense"	August 27, 2006	April 8, 2008	118
Milo needs a birthday gift for his grandmother while helping Ruth to hide her condition.
19a	"Missed Manners"	September 17, 2006	April 15, 2008	119
Milo and Lizbeth must teach Dashrag and Sanjay some manners.
19b	"Domo Ari Otto, Mr. Robotto"	September 17, 2006	April 15, 2008	119
Otto created a robot and it is out of control while Milo causes a malfunction to his computer.
20a	"The Good, the Bad and the L'il"	September 24, 2006	April 22, 2008	120
Otto must defend "Fort Chesterfield" (which is a makeshift bunker out of pillows and other items) after a feud with his brother and his friends.
20b	"Pop Goes the Milo"	September 24, 2006	April 22, 2008	120
Milo was preparing his wish list for his upcoming birthday but at the same time, he and Lizbeth must help Max overcome his fear of pop-up books.
21a	"Just Looking"	October 8, 2006	April 29, 2008	121
Milo gets a puppet stuck on his hand while finding Sanjay in a historical museum.
21b	"Outrageous Fortune Cookie"	October 8, 2006	April 29, 2008	121
Milo must solve a cryptic fortune cookie message while helping Rutger's dad stop his addiction to electronics.
22a	"Infield Error"	October 18, 2006	June 17, 2008	122
Due to confusion, Milo's dad promoted "Flamingo Man" in his store. However, Milo and Lizbeth must assist Sanjay's baseball team.
22b	"New Bird on the Block"	October 18, 2006	June 17, 2008	122
Wendell becomes Commander Whooping Crane to face-off with Milo's Captain Flamingo identity.
23a	"Bug Out"	November 19, 2006	June 18, 2008	123
Milo must complete the task of growing a plant for Summer Science Day Camp. However, Milo and Lizbeth must clean up the drawings on the wall by Kirsten.
23b	"Pasta Your Bedtime"	November 19, 2006	June 18, 2008	123
Milo and Lizbeth must remind Megan that it is daytime and Owen has to go to World O Fun Fun-Nasium for kid night.
24a	"Under There Underwear"	December 11, 2006	June 19, 2008	124
Milo and Lizbeth must find Owen's luxurious underwear at the World O Fun Fun-Nasium's locker room.
24b	"Exhibit Yikes"	December 11, 2006	June 19, 2008	124
Milo and Lizbeth must help Max catch a thief at a museum.
25a	"Burr in the Hand"	December 18, 2006	June 24, 2008	125
Milo helps Max with the Big Wheel to get rid of burrs.
25b	"Blindsided"	December 18, 2006	June 24, 2008	125
Milo must break up the feud between Otto and Tabitha while wearing XXS night-vision goggles stuck on his face.
26a	"Knot in My Backyard"	January 8, 2007	Unaired	126
Milo has a knot in his shoelaces and must stop Tucker from streaking throughout Halverston and the rest of Toronto.
26b	"Real to Me"	January 8, 2007	Unaired	126
Milo questions whether Quantum Vigilante is real or not while helping Otto decorate the front yard with rocks.

=== Season 2 (2007) ===
No. overall	No. in season	Title	Canadian air date (YTV)	U.S. air date (Toon Disney/Jetix)	Prod. code
27a	1a	"Monster Headache"	February 18, 2007	June 26, 2008	201
Milo's Captain Flamingo costume is worn out. However, he must defeat monsters who are crashing Lizbeth's fundraising event.
27b	1b	"Volunteers for Fears"	February 18, 2007	June 26, 2008	201
Tabitha was organizing a charity event but Milo is sleepless due to having nightmares of traumatic events that happened to him.
28a	2a	"Phone Tag"	March 10, 2007	August 22, 2008	204
While Milo gets unwanted pizza deliveries thanks to Thor, Ruth loses her phone while on the bus. Milo and Lizbeth must find Ruth's phone from their teacher.
28b	2b	"Max Invader, Scourge of the Universe"	March 10, 2007	August 22, 2008	204
Milo is forced to wear Wendell's hand-me-downs while Max, dressed as Darth Vader is in danger of being kidnapped by alien, mistaking him for their leader. Milo and Lizbeth protect Max from being abducted.
29a	3a	"Hairdos and Don'ts"	April 9, 2007	July 1, 2008	202
Ruth accidentally dyes her hair green while gaining telekinetic powers thanks to a math solution by Milo.
29b	3b	"Baby You Can Drive My Karma"	April 9, 2007	July 1, 2008	202
Milo must find Rutger's "lucky spider" (a plush spider toy) while gaining positive thoughts.
30a	4a	"Training Wreck"	May 6, 2007	July 2, 2008	203
Milo and Lizbeth must find Sanjay's dog, Dookie Doo.
30b	4b	"Nothing But the Tooth"	May 6, 2007	July 2, 2008	203
Milo tries the new eyeball jawbreaker whoever Milo and Lizbeth must tell Max not to be afraid of the tooth fairy.
31a	5a	"Warrior Monkey, M.D."	May 20, 2007	July 16, 2008	210
Captain Flamingo must get Owen-Only out from the hospital before he was taken hostage by the Warrior Monkey.
31b	5b	"Past Imperfect"	May 20, 2007	July 16, 2008	210
Milo and Lizbeth go back in time to find Milo's parents as children.
32a	6a	"When Good Birds Go Bad"	May 27, 2007	July 3, 2008	205
Captain Flamingo and Owen are trying to regain parental approval.
32b	6b	"Face the Music"	May 27, 2007	July 3, 2008	205
Milo, Lizbeth, and Thrasher must find Rutger's glasses.
33a	7a	"Change of Heart"	June 3, 2007 (private screening); February 14, 2009 (public airing)	July 17, 2008	211
Milo and Lizbeth investigate a mass hysteria of chasing anyone for love during a Valentine's Day party.
33b	7b	"Door Stop in the Name of Love"	June 3, 2007 (private screening); February 14, 2009 (public airing)	July 17, 2008	211
Milo and Otto compete at the Big Impressive Contest.
34a	8a	"Fault Line"	June 10, 2007	July 22, 2008	212
Captain Flamingo must prove "Bad Avi" exists to save Avi and get himself out of trouble too!
34b	8b	"The Globnick"	June 10, 2007	July 22, 2008	212
Milo and Lizbeth must show their friendship to Mth.
35a	9a	"Everybody Was Tofu Fighting"	June 24, 2007	July 23, 2008	213
The kids are all becoming self-sufficient until a fast-food vegetarian restaurant was involved in a feud.
35b	9b	"Journey to the Centre of the TV"	June 24, 2007	July 23, 2008	213
Milo and Lizbeth dream of helping Quantum Vigilante fight his nemesis/ex-wife The Ex.
36a	10a	"Captain Copycat"	August 19, 2007 (private screening); October 31, 2009 (public airing)	July 8, 2008	206
An imposter dresses up as the Captain for Halloween and Milo and Lizbeth must stop the imposter.
36b	10b	"Night of the Living Flamingo"	August 19, 2007 (private screening); October 31, 2009 (public airing)	July 8, 2008	206
Otto must protect a brain (which is actually a fruit jelly) from "zombies" on Halloween Night.
37a	11a	"Saddle Brained"	August 26, 2007	July 9, 2008	207
Captain Flamingo must share his bedroom with Thor while Kirsten adopts a pony and an elephant at home.
37b	11b	"Name Dropper"	August 26, 2007	July 9, 2008	207
Milo, Lizbeth, and Winona (Lizbeth's older sister) must face Nicholas Names after he insults Tabitha.
38a	12a	"Ready to Swear"	September 2, 2007	July 10, 2008	208
Tucker has a potty mouth which bothered Tabitha and Milo and Lizbeth must stop Tucker from saying things that he should not say.
38b	12b	"Elephant and Hassle"	September 2, 2007	July 10, 2008	208
While wearing a heavy winter jacket on the hottest day of summer, Captain Flamingo battle against the Nugent to save Lizbeth's stuffed elephant Chester.
39a	13a	"Fun and Games"	September 9, 2007	July 15, 2008	209
Milo had his dentist appointment interrupted when Kirsten calls him due to Ruth being busy with Jennifer and her friends.
39b	13b	"Adventures of Milo Sitting"	September 9, 2007	July 15, 2008	209
Wendell is in charge of Milo and Thor while being chased by squirrels.

=== Season 3 (2008–10) ===
No. overall	No. in season	Title	Canadian air date (YTV)	U.S. air date (Toon Disney/Jetix)	Prod. code
40a	1a	"Scrambled Legs"	January 13, 2008	July 24, 2008	301
Milo and Dashrag are at war and Milo's mom had to stop the fighting. Tabitha and Sanjay were also at war over a three-legged race.
40b	1b	"Full Wooden Woggle"	January 13, 2008	July 24, 2008	301
Milo and Wendell must follow the bus rules to attend the Lemming Scout Jamboree.
41a	2a	"Alley Oops!"	January 20, 2008	July 29, 2008	302
Milo with Rutger and Lizbeth watches a monster and a unicorn movie (respectively) and has to switch theatres.
41b	2b	"Catch of the Day"	January 20, 2008	July 29, 2008	302
Milo's baseball game must pause after Tabitha's report got mixed up and was due today.
42a	3a	"Flamingopalooza"	February 3, 2008	July 30, 2008	303
Milo and Lizbeth must find Thrasher's electric guitar for him to participate in a concert to raise funds for flamingo protection.
42b	3b	"The Snake Whisperer"	February 3, 2008	July 30, 2008	303
Milo and Lizbeth must expose the media for making fake news about Otto's pet snake, Frank.
43a	4a	"Deep DueDue"	February 17, 2008	July 31, 2008	304
Milo must return his library book by 3:00 PM and teach Rutger how to use stilts.
43b	4b	"Milo and Wendell's Eggcellent Adventure"	February 17, 2008	July 31, 2008	304
Milo must take care of his egg while helping Sanjay hide the paint on Dinke Doo's doghouse.
44a	5a	"Sweetness and Light"	February 24, 2008	August 5, 2008	305
Milo and Lizbeth (while selling light blubs) help Ruth filming for the commercials that she is starring in.
44b	5b	"A Boy and his Yeti"	February 24, 2008	August 5, 2008	305
Milo, Lizbeth, and the Lemming Scouts must find the Yellow Gulch Yeti after it allegedly wrecks their campsite.
45a	6a	"Playing It Koi"	March 2, 2008	August 6, 2008	306
Sanjay's efforts to take care of the goldfish go wrong.
45b	6b	"Rebel Without a Clog"	March 2, 2008	August 6, 2008	306
Milo must take clog tapping lessons with Mth and Wendell.
46a	7a	"Come Rain or Come Slime"	March 17, 2008	August 7, 2008	307
Milo forgets to bring in his Flamingo outfit from the rain and now he needs it to rescue Max from an army of worms.
46b	7b	"Rear Basement Window"	March 17, 2008	August 7, 2008	307
Milo had found the Quantum Vigilante Stealth Interceptor in the basement. At the same time, Rutger was playing in the garage filled with prized possessions. Lizbeth must do something about this but she must face her allergies.
47a	8a	"Switch Hitch"	March 24, 2008	October 10, 2008	308
Milo and Wendell trade places for a day and things were not easy as they would think.
47b	8b	"Appetite for Instructions"	March 24, 2008	October 10, 2008	308
Milo must use his Trans-Morph-o-bot 6000 to save Otto from his brothers and his friends while raking leaves.
48a	9a	"Ghost Almost"	March 31, 2008	October 11, 2008	309
There is something or someone the Captain has never faced before, a ghost called Scary Mary.
48b	9b	"Comic Slip"	March 31, 2008	October 11, 2008	309
Milo, Lizbeth, Max, and Owen are fighting each other for a comic and a board game.
49a	10a	"When Fools Rush In"	April 1, 2008	October 12, 2008	310
Milo must avoid being tricked while looking for a giant lizard or it could be the giant lizard was just a prank.
49b	10b	"A Slight Mthunderstanding"	April 1, 2008	October 12, 2008	310
Milo and Lizbeth must help Mth about April Fools.
50a	11a	"The End"	April 7, 2008	October 13, 2008	311
Milo was trying the new formula of the Super Fruit Blast Grainy-Os when he has to help Sanjay after the "Cruddy Buddies" book had its ending missing.
50b	11b	"The One and Owen-Only"	April 7, 2008	October 13, 2008	311
Thrasher's brother has to be sent to the hospital due to his arms being in pain and Thrasher had invited Owen's mother as a replacement drummer.
51	12	"The Gobbler Robbler / Saint Nick O' Time"	April 10, 2008 (private screening); December 19, 2010 (public airing)	November 27, 2008	312
Milo sends letters to Santa on Christmas Eve. However, Lizbeth forgets to send in her letter. During which, Tabitha's Christmas dinner is eaten up by the Gobbler Robbler. After that, while Milo and Lizbeth are rushing in to send in their letters to Santa, several kids had called Milo for help.
52a	13a	"CF: The Musical"	April 17, 2008	October 14, 2008	313
Captain Flamingo must help Kirsten put on a show dedicated to Captain Flamingo's contributions to Helverston-in-Area. However, the Warrior Monkey had plans to crash the stage.
52b	13b	"Cliffhanger"	April 17, 2008	October 14, 2008	313
Captain Flamingo must stop the Daylight Savings Mime from getting several kids into trouble and prevent the Daylight Savings Time from pushing to one hour in the wrong month.

== Telecast and home media ==
Captain Flamingo was first premiered on YTV on February 7, 2006, and ended on December 19, 2010, with the Christmas episode. Nickelodeon also aired the show in reruns from November 2, 2009 (launch date) until June 3, 2013. In the U.S., the show premiered on Toon Disney on January 28, 2008, at 8:30 AM, although it was initially going to be broadcast during their Jetix programming block. Captain Flamingo was removed from the Toon Disney schedule on August 12, 2008, but returned on September 2 at 5:30 a.m. When Toon Disney was rebranded to Disney XD on February 13, 2009, Captain Flamingo was once again removed, and has not aired in the U.S. since.

As of 2022, the show is now streaming on both Peacock and Tubi.

In May 2006, Jetix Europe acquired the European and Middle Eastern pay-TV rights, in addition to television distribution, (serviced by Buena Vista International Television on behalf of the network) home video and consumer product rights to the series in the said territories, except for Spain and Portugal. Therefore, it started airing on European channels of the network, excluding France, in Autumn 2006.

The three DVD releases of the show were released on June 29, 2011, only in region four. Each release contained only fourteen episodes from the first season. But other regional releases have not yet been released.

Captain Flamingo home video releases
Season		Episodes	Release dates
Season		Episodes	Australia
1	2006–07	52	Volume 1: The Flamingo Has Landed: June 29, 2011; Episodes: "The Flamingo Has Landed" – "Basement of Yuck" • "Beyond the Thundermonkey Dome" – "Portrait of a Superhero" Volume 2: I Scream You Scam: June 29, 2011; Episodes: "I Scream, You Scram!" • "Ball of Confusion" • "Ack! Give My Backpack Back, Jack" – "Blizzard of Ooze" • "Ten Pin Peril" • "Whack-a-Max" Volume 3: Cheese the Day: June 29, 2011; Episodes: "The Best Episode Ever" • "Charge It" • "Cheese the Day" – "Talking to Ralph on the Big Porcelain Phone"

== Reception ==
Captain Flamingo received mixed reviews but has since gained a cult following.

Anne Louise Bannon of Common Sense Media rated the show two stars out of five, noting that it targeted adult audiences rather than "the 7-year-olds who will most likely be watching." On the other hand, she also says about "mildly" funny moments "at best."
