= Max Morrow =

Canadian actor

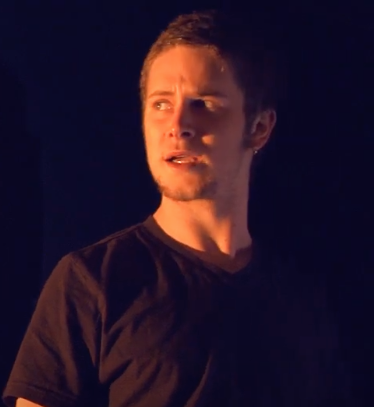
- Morrow in a 2012 short film, Jump
- Occupations: Actor, hype man
- Years active: 1998–2012

Max Morrow is a Canadian former actor. He is best known for his roles in Connor Undercover as the title character, Monk as Benjy Fleming, The Christmas Shoes, Sister Mary Explains It All, and The Great Goose Caper.

== Filmography ==
=== Movies ===
Year	Film	Role	Notes
1999	Seasons of Love	Young Hocking	TV movie
1999	Jacob Two Two Meets the Hooded Fang	Jacob Two Two	
2000	One Kill	Harry O'Malley	TV movie
2000	Santa Who?	Zack Dreyer	TV movie
2001	Jewel	Wilman Hilburn (Age 10)	TV movie
2001	Sister Mary Explains It All	Zack Thomas	TV movie
2001	The Little Bear Movie	Little Moose	Voice
2002	Ararat	Tony	
2002	The Brady Bunch in the White House	Bobby Brady	TV movie
2002	The Christmas Shoes	Nathan Andrews	TV movie
2003	Shattered City: The Halifax Explosion	Courtney 'Court' Collins	TV movie
2006	Goose on the Loose	Will Donnelly	TV movie
2008	The Russell Girl	Rick Morrissey	TV movie

=== Television ===
Year	Show	Role	Notes
1998 - 1999	Noddy	Truman Tomten	66 Episodes
2000	Twice in a Lifetime	Gabe	2 Episodes
2000 - 2002	Timothy Goes to School	Charles	Series regular, voice only
2002	The Associates	Stephen Lordon	Episode: Parents: Who Needs 'Em?
2002	Monk	Benjy Fleming	7 Episodes
2002	Mutant X	Young Gabriel Ashlocke	Episode: Time Squared
2003	Veritas: The Quest	Young Nikko Zond	2 Episodes
2007	St. Urbain's Horseman	Young Jake	Mini-series
2010	Connor Undercover	Connor Heath	38 Episodes
2010	Republic of Doyle	Keith	Episode: The Return of the Grievous Angel
2010	Murdoch Mysteries	Clarence	Episode: Love and Human Remains
2011	Warehouse 13	Tyler Struhl	3 Episodes
