= Marline Yan =

Canadian actress and singer (born 1993)

- Born: January 9, 1993 (age 33); St. Thomas, Ontario, Canada
- Occupations: Actress, singer
- Years active: 2009–present

Marline Yan (born January 9, 1993) is a Canadian actress and singer. Her most prominent appearance is in Canadian television series How To Be Indie.

== Career ==
Yan started acting and singing at ten years of age in shows from local theatre companies. In her first year of high school at John Paul II Catholic Secondary School, in London, Ontario, she was cast as the leading role in a production of Romeo and Juliet. At the age fourteen, she was first signed on to an agency and a year later was cast for the role of Abigail, a Filipino-Canadian girl who is also Indie's best friend in the YTV series How To Be Indie. Later that year, she appeared as Sophia in the successful Family Channel series Connor Undercover.

In 2010, Yan was cast in a minor two-episode role for Wingin' It, a children's series which also starred her How to Be Indie co-star Dylan Everett. She most recently completed a television film titled Made... The Movie and was cast for an upcoming film Trigger. Subsequently, she returned for a second season of How To Be Indie, which premiered in fall 2010.

== Filmography ==
=== Film and television ===
Year	Title	Role	Notes
2009–2011	How to Be Indie	Abigail 'Abi' Flores	Main role
2010	Wingin' It	Linda Peachtree	"Getting Out of Dodge"
2010	Made... The Movie	Kitty	TV film
2010	Trigger	Rocker Chick No. 2	Film
2011	Connor Undercover	Sophia	"See You There", "003rd Wheel", "If You Could Read My Mind"
2015	Saving Hope	Jian Doo	"Narrow Margin"
