= Sister Mary Explains It All =

2001 television film directed by Marshall Brickman

- Film poster
- Genre: Comedy Drama
- Written by: Christopher Durang
- Directed by: Marshall Brickman
- Starring: Diane Keaton; Brian Benben; Wallace Langham; Laura San Giacomo; Jennifer Tilly
- Country of origin: United States
- Original language: English

Production
- Producer: Ronald M. Bozman
- Cinematography: Anthony B. Richmond
- Editor: Kristina Boden
- Running time: 76 minutes
- Production companies: Tennant/Stambler Productions; Columbia TriStar Television

Original release
- Network: Showtime
- Release: May 27, 2001

Sister Mary Explains It All is a 2001 satirical dark comedy film written by Christopher Durang and directed by Marshall Brickman. The film, based upon Durang's 1979 play Sister Mary Ignatius Explains It All for You, and starring Diane Keaton in the title role, premiered on the Showtime network.

== Background ==
The project was filmed in Toronto in association with Columbia TriStar Television. The theme was originally covered in Christopher Durang's controversial 1979 stage play. In updating the character of Sister Mary, Durang read through 15 earlier drafts of the screenplay and discussed changes with Brickman and the producers. The original film title was Sister Mary, but Durang felt the proffered title was too generic, preferring the original theatrical title. For the film, Keaton was Brickman's choice for the role, which was cast against type, and she accepted the part because she thought she couldn't do it.

The Catholic League objected to the depiction of Catholicism in the film and took out a full-page advertisement in Variety to protest its broadcast. William A. Donohue, the president of the Catholic League, called for a boycott of Viacom, Showtime's parent company.

== Plot ==
Sister Mary (Diane Keaton) is an authoritarian Catholic nun who teaches children. Her teaching is heavily influenced by her fanatical beliefs. Four of her former pupils, Gary (Brian Benben), Aloysius (Wallace Langham), Angela (Laura San Giacomo) and Philomena (Jennifer Tilly), return to the school to show her how deeply her strict views on faith and sin have affected their lives.

== Partial cast ==
- Diane Keaton as Sister Mary Ignatius
- Brian Benben as Gary Sullivan
- Wallace Langham as Aloysius Benheim
- Laura San Giacomo as Angela DiMarco
- Jennifer Tilly as Philomena Rostovich
- Max Morrow as Thomas
- Martin Mull as Skeptical Husband
- Linda Kash as Skeptical Husband's Wife
- Victoria Tennant as Bitter Divorcee
- Michael Cameron as Young Gary Sullivan
- Gary Pearson as Man in Audience

== Critical reception ==
Steven Oxman of Variety wrote "Satire tends to date quickly, but Christopher Durang's 1980 black comedy criticizing Catholic rigidity, Sister Mary Ignatius Explains It All for You, still has some bite to it, which says a lot about the writer's incisive wit". He noted that the film did not have the same theatricality of Durang's initial work, and that with the original stageplay constructed for the audience's participation, the film included actors as representing broad characterizations of the play's audiences. Oxman concluded that the film might have perhaps remained truer to the original play had Sister Mary delivered her lecture directly to her unseen television audience.

== Recognition ==
Max Morrow received a 2002 Young Artist Award nomination for "Best Performance in a TV Movie or Special — Supporting Young Actor" for his role of Thomas.
