= Connor Undercover =

Canadian TV series

- Main characters
- Created by: Suzanne Bolch; John May
- Starring: Max Morrow; Lola Tash; Gavin Fox; Jordan Francis; Carleigh Beverly; Dylan Authors; Ana Golja
- Theme music composer: Carlos Lopes
- Opening theme: "I'll Always Be With You" performed by Rex Goudie
- Composer: Carlos Lopes
- Country of origin: Canada
- No. of seasons: 2
- No. of episodes: 25 (38 filmed) (list of episodes)

Production
- Executive producers: Suzanne Bolch; John May; Karen Lee Hall; Christina Jennings; Scott Garvie
- Producers: Laura Harbin; Jennifer Pun Morrissette; Suzanne French
- Production locations: Toronto, Ontario (setting and filming location)
- Camera setup: Single-camera
- Running time: Approx. 23 minutes
- Production companies: Heroic Film Company; Shaftesbury Kids

Original release
- Network: Family Channel
- Release: 9 April 2010 – 19 February 2011

Connor Undercover is a Canadian teen action comedy television series airing on Canadian specialty channel Family Channel. It stars Max Morrow as the title character Connor Heath. It is co-produced by Heroic Film Company and Shaftesbury Films. In early 2010, Family Channel renewed the series for a second season.

== Overview ==
=== Season 1 (2010) ===
Connor Heath is an ordinary 15-year-old. He extremely over imagines things and is always looking for adventure however he never finds any, that is until the Cordoban president's daughter is sent to live with him and his family. After numerous attempts on Gisela's life, Ed, a bodyguard for the Cordoban secret service joins them. The main antagonist is former friend of Gisela, now double agent Zatari, whose mission is to capture Gisela.

=== Season 2 (2010–11) ===
Zatari, an ex-agent has re-appeared on a mission to capture DNA from Gisela to use in illegal human cloning, causing Ed to place Gisela in a safe house, away from school and the outside world. After Connor fails his Camp X test in order to protect Gisela, he finds himself being trained by Ed to become a proper spy to be able to protect Gisela anywhere she goes.

== Production ==
The Family Channel Canada commissioned the series in 2008. Series one was filmed in early 2009 and first premiered on the Australian channel ABC3 on the 12 April 2010 and premiered on Family Channel on 17 September 2010. It was co-produced by Heroic Films Company and Shaftesbury Films. The Family Channel commissioned a second season of 26 episodes, which world premiered again on ABC3 on 11 October 2010. Although the series is Canadian, the world premiere was given to the Australian Broadcasting Corporation. The series was filmed on location in Toronto, Ontario, Canada.

== Cast ==
=== Main ===
- Max Morrow as Connor Heath
- Lola Tash as Gisela Calicos
- Gavin Fox as Eduardo Garcia
- Jordan Francis as Dave "Whynot" Wynott
- Carleigh Beverly as Tanya Gilette
- Dylan Authors as Ty Heath
- Ana Golja as Lily Bogdakovitch

=== Recurring ===
- Howard Hoover as Reuben Heath
- Jude Coffey as Julia Heath
- Randy Thomas as President Calicos
- Raquel Cadilha as Tanya
- Will Bowes as Renford
- Marline Yan as Sophia
- Jacob Neayem as Hugo
- Tattiawna Jones as Zatari
- Kyle McDonald as Azul
- Marco Grazzini as The Messenger
- Pat Mastroianni as Diego
- Alex Karzis as The Magician
- Jamie Johnston as Andre

== Episodes ==
Series	Episodes	Originally released	
Series	Episodes	First released	Last released
1	13	9 April 2010	26 April 2010
2	25	11 October 2010	19 February 2011

== International broadcasts ==
Country	Channel	Year
Australia	ABC3 ABC1	12 April 2010 -
Germany	Nickelodeon	22 August 2010 - 18 August 2010
Poland	Disney XD	January 2011
Canada	Family Channel	17 September 2010 -
Canada	Disney XD	June 1, 2011
United States	Starz Kids & Family	1 March 2011 -
Finland	YLE 2	1 August 2011 -
Great Britain	Boomerang UK	2010 -
France	Gulli	2010 -
Belgium	Ketnet	17 January 2011 -
Portugal	Panda Biggs	9 April 2012 -
Turkey	JOJO	2010 -
Israel	Arutz HaYeladim	2010 -
India	Disney Channel India	2012 -
Argentina; Chile; Colombia; Mexico; Brazil; Uruguay; Paraguay; Guatemala; Panama; Bolivia; Venezuela; Belize; Costa Rica; Nicaragua; Honduras; Peru; Ecuador; El Salvador	Boomerang LA	3 August 2010
United Arab Emirates	E-Junior	January 2012 -
Greece	Disney XD	Summer 2010 -
Serbia	RTV Vojvodina	Autumn 2016 -
