= Gavin Fox (actor) =

Canadian actor

- Occupation: Actor
- Years active: 2003-present

Gavin Fox is a Canadian actor, best known for his roles as Eduardo Garcia in the television series Connor Undercover, Dutch Balik in the film Kin, and Gared in the television series Killjoys.

His father David Fox, was also an actor.

In addition to his acting roles, Fox has also worked as a post-production assistant on various animated television series.

== Acting career ==
=== Television ===
Year	Title	Role	Notes
2003	Queer as Folk	Roy	2 episodes
2003	Tarzan	Cop	Episode: "The End of the Beginning"
2004	Wild Card	Fireman	Episode: "A Felony for Melanie"
2005	Naturally, Sadie	Concert Bouncer	Episode: "Whose Line Is It Anyway?"
2005	Code Breakers	Uncredited	TV movie
2005	72 Hours: True Crime	Jim Thompson	Episode: "Head in a Bucket"
2007	Jeff Ltd.	Delivery Guy	Episode: "I Want to Be Your Daddy"
2009	Warehouse 13	Deputy Tim	Episode: "Pilot"
2009	The Border	Jaw	Episode: "Dark Ride"
2009–2011	Connor Undercover	Edward Garcia	31 episodes
2010	Unnatural History	Coach Couch	Episode: "The Liberian Candidate"
2011	Desperately Seeking Santa	Guido Juicehead	TV movie
2012	Beyblade: Shogun Steel	Spike Bourne (voice; English version)	1 episode
2012	The Listener	Trainer	Episode: "Cold Case Blues"
2012	Alphas	The Caretaker	Episode: "If Memory Serves"
2012	Flashpoint	Paul	2 episodes
2012	Beauty & the Beast	Colonel Johnson	Episode: "Trapped"
2013	The Ron James Show	Chaz	Episode: "Science"
2013	Nikita	Toronto Cop	Episode: "High-Value Target"
2013	Cracked	Mungo Golding	Episode: "Voices"
2013	Beyblade: Metal Fusion	Spike Bourne (voice)	3 episodes
2015	Orphan Black	Lionel	2 episodes
2015–2023	Murdoch Mysteries	The Masked Maruader / Humber / Harry Hayes	2 episodes
2016	Private Eyes	Doug Boonstra	Episode: "Mise en Place"
2016	Make It Pop	Dino the Bodyguard	Episode: "Summer Splash Spectacular"
2016–2019	Killjoys	Gared Douleheny	20 episodes
2017	Man Seeking Woman	Logan	Episode: "Dolphin"
2017	Saving Hope	Niles Sawyer	Episode: "Nightmares & Dreamscapes"
2017	Suits	Jamarcus Collins	Episode: "Brooklyn Housing"
2018	Taken	Payne	Episode: "S.E.R.E."
2018	Designated Survivor	Seal Team Leader	Episode: "Overkill"
2019	The Handmaid's Tale	Cameron (uncredited)	Episode: "Heroic"
2019	D.N. Ace	Bucky Blowtorch (voice)	2 episodes
2020–2021	Letterkenny	The Juicehead	2 episodes
2020–2023	What We Do in the Shadows	Frank	5 episodes
2021	Hudson & Rex	Mick Kirwin	Episode: "Manhunt"
2021	See	Torturer	Episode: "Brothers and Sisters"
2022	Transplant	Brock Paulson	Episode: "Work to Rule"
2023–2024	Reacher	Lennox	3 episodes

=== Film ===
Year	Title	Role	Notes
2010	Repo Men	Muscular Boyfriend (uncredited)	
2010	A Beginner's Guide to Endings	Rahm the Baptist	
2012	The Conspiracy	Guard	
2012	A Cooling of the Blood	Police Officer	Short
2018	Kin	Dutch Balik	
2021	The Retreat	Victor	
