= How to Be Indie =

Canadian television show

- Title card
- Genre: Comedy; Children's television
- Created by: Vera Santamaria; John May; Suzanne Bolch
- Starring: Melinda Shankar; Marline Yan; Dylan Everett
- Composer: Carlos Lopes
- Country of origin: Canada
- Original language: English
- No. of seasons: 2
- No. of episodes: 52

Production
- Executive producers: Suzanne Bolch; John May; Vera Santamaria; Karen Lee Hall; Neil Court
- Producers: Colin Brunton; Jennifer Pun Morrissette
- Running time: 22 minutes
- Production companies: Heroic Television (Note: Known as Heroic Film Company for the first season. Credited as Indie 1 Inc. or Indie 2 Inc.); Sudden Storm Entertainment (Season 2)

Original release
- Network: YTV
- Release: October 2, 2009 – October 24, 2011

How to Be Indie is a Canadian television sitcom produced by Heroic Television and distributed by DHX Media (Note: Known as Decode Entertainment for the first season.). The series that aired on YTV from 2009 to 2011. The program is a single-camera series intended for a youth audience.

The series was created by Vera Santamaria, John May and Suzanne Bolch, and ran for two seasons of 52 episodes, with its final episode airing on October 24, 2011, on YTV in Canada, and May 26, 2012, on Disney Channel in the United Kingdom.

== Plot ==
The show's main character is a 13-year-old Indian Canadian teenager named Indira "Indie" Mehta. The program follows Indie's journey as she tries to get the most out of life despite the trials of junior high school and the expectations of her Indian parents. She is joined by her two best friends, Marlon Parks and Abigail "Abi" Flores.

Indie often falls into the trap of caring more about what her peers think of her than who she wants to be herself, and consequently spends a lot of time trying to impress her classmates. When not focusing on Indie, the show focuses on Marlon and Abi.

== Production ==
The show was produced by Heroic Film Company in association with DHX Media and YTV and created by writer Vera Santamaria, Suzanne Bolch, and John May. Season one filmed 26 twenty-five-minute episodes and first premiered on 2 October 2009. The show was a part of YTV's "Big Fun Weeknights."

A second season began filming in summer 2010, shooting five episodes, and resumed filming in November 2010. The second season premiered on October 11, 2010. The series was not picked up for a third season.

== Cast ==
=== Main ===
From left to right, Dylan Everett as Marlon, Melinda Shankar as Indie and Marline Yan as Abi from Season 1

- Melinda Shankar as Indira "Indie" Mehta, the main character of the show. An upbeat and lively teenager, she is a new generation of Indian and is very modern, which often clashes with her parents.
- Marline Yan as Abigail "Abi" Flores, Indie's best friend. Abi is very intelligent, always being there to get Indie and Marlon Parks out of trouble. Her parents have owned the Happy Breezy Food Hut since she was 5 years old.
- Dylan Everett as Marlon Parks, Indie's troublesome friend. He often relies on Abi to help him get out of trouble. He is raised by a single mother who is never shown onscreen.
- Sarena Parmar as Chandra Mehta, Indie's older sister. She enjoys being in the spotlight and outdoing her sister and brother, usually being rather selfish and selling her siblings out to get her way. Chandra is very familiar with her parents' traditional expectations and values, often finding ways around them with greater ease than Indie. She occasionally offers Indie sound advice.
- Varun Saranga as Arun Joshi "A.J." Mehta, Indie's older brother. He is the intelligent one in the family, but is known as a geek in school.
- Ellora Patnaik as Jyoti Mehta, Indie's mother. She is very traditional, usually favouring Chandra for being able to impress relatives.
- Vijay Mehta as Vikram Mehta, Indie's father. He often tries to boost his children's intelligence and has an aversion to spending large amounts of money.
- Errol Sitahal as Prakash Mehta, Indie's paternal grandfather, known more familiarly as "Babaji".

=== Recurring ===
- Shainu Bala as Ram Ramechandran, a boy from India who lusts after Indie and loves proving his superiority.
- Nikki Shah as Ruby Patel, Indie, Chandra and A.J.'s cousin, the daughter of Jyoti's sister who is very self-absorbed and loves to torment Indie by showing that she's better than her at everything.
- Atticus Mitchell as Carlos Martinelli, a short-tempered student who loves to victimize other students who get in his way.
- Deborah Grover as Mrs. Roland, Indie's teacher who is very stern, but deep down has a good heart.
- Jordan Hudyma as Chad Tash (Season 1) Indie's love interest for the first season.
- Ted Ludzik as Coach Wexler, the P.E. teacher at the school, who has a very short temper.
- Alex De Jordy as Mike O'Donnell (Season 1) A.J.'s rival, whom he often competes for supremacy with.
- Georgina Reilly as Skye Rivers (Season 1) a gorgeous senior girl who Indie strives to impress.
- Jason Jia as John Lu (Season 1) a Chinese student who idolizes Marlon and will help him with any ideas he has.
- Cassius Crieghtney as Dre (Season 2) an employee of the Happy Breezy Food Hut.
- Timothy Lai as Aidan (Season 2) Indie's love interest after she loses interest in Chad.
- Max Topplin as Madison
- Will Bowes as Chuck

== Episodes ==
=== Season 1 (2009–10) ===
No.	Title	Original release date
1	"How to Make Your Rep"	2 October 2009
The first week back at school Indie lies about how she spent her summer, saying she went to camp - when really she spent her whole vacation in the basement, learning Mandarin. But it's when she claims to have escaped a Grizzly attack that things go horribly wrong. Meanwhile, Marlon tries to build himself an entourage.
2	"How to Have Your Samosa and Eat It Too"	2 October 2009
Indie wants to show the school that South Asian food is awesome! But chaos ensues when nemesis Ram Ramachandran challenges her to a cook-off for culinary superiority. Meanwhile, Abi and Marlon run into trouble when they have to deal with their own "traditional" foods.
3	"How To Get On Carlos Martinelli's Capital "L" List, and Live"	9 October 2009
Indie plans to throw a super-fantastic party to strike her name off of Carlos Martinelli's humiliation list. Too bad live chickens, family and other technical problems keep the party from being anything but normal. Meanwhile, AJ has a new telescope to look at the cosmos - but his friends have some other "heavenly bodies" in mind.
4	"How to Trick Your Parents Into Treating You Like A Grown Up"	16 October 2009
On Halloween, Indie receives a creepy doll, that's out to get her! Meanwhile, Abi, ever the voice of reason, refuses to be scared. But Marlon sets out to prove that everybody - including Abi - freaks out sometimes.
5	"How to Strike a Balance"	23 October 2009
Can Indie and Abi finally put an end to their mothers' "my kid is better than your kid" contests? They're going to try, by faking that Indie is a great piano player. Meanwhile, AJ and Chandra get chicken pox and are quarantined together.
6	"How to Be a Mehta"	30 October 2009
Indie just wants to be like the rest of her family - super smart and super amazing at school - but will gym class stand in the way?. Meanwhile, Marlon gets worried when John Lu - his biggest admirer - steals his mojo.
7	"How to Make a Comeback"	6 November 2009
Indie, Abi and Marlon join the Rexdale High quiz team and get special coaching from trivia king and Quiz Bowl master, Mr. Mehta. Meanwhile, AJ tries to bulk up fast for the wrestling unit in gym class - or risk being destroyed by Mike O'Donnell.
8	"How to Be Ridonkulous"	13 November 2009
Indie wants to go to the hottest concert of the year, but can she convince her parents to get her a cell phone so she can win tickets from Miracle FM? Meanwhile, Marlon decides to sell phones to earn some quick cash, so he enlists Abi's help to hone his sales skills.
9	"How to Get a Pet"	20 November 2009
How do you turn a turtle into a puppy? In Indie's case, it's all about proving you're so good at looking after an ooky, unlovable reptile that Mum has to buy you a dog! Meanwhile, AJ is invited to join a secret geek society, but his competition is geek king Mike O'Donnell.
10	"How to Succeed in Business Without Really Lying"	27 November 2009
Indie goes head to head in business battle with Ruby but can she succeed and stay honest at the same time? Meanwhile, Marlon tries to get Abi out of working at the restaurant by getting her detention.
11	"How to Get Some Cred"	22 January 2010
When Indie enters a dance contest to prove her Indian cred to Ruby and her friends, she discovers her mom's got some shockingly cool moves of her own. Meanwhile, Marlon isn't going to take anything sitting down, because he can't. His pants are way too tight!
12	"How to Prove You're Actually a Nice Person..."	22 January 2010
When Indie accidentally makes a jerk of herself at school, will she be able to fix her tarnished reputation through super-human charity stunts? Meanwhile, Carlos makes Marlon and Abi an offer they can't refuse.
13	"How to Make a Good Impression"	29 January 2010
When she's crushing this hard, is there any way a tongue-tied Indie can make a good impression on her new neighbour, Chad Tash? Meanwhile, Marlon accidentally drops Abi's retainer in the toilet, sparking a no-holds-barred prank war.
14	"How to Keep Your Cool in a Heat Wave"	5 February 2010
Suffering from heat exhaustion, Indie and Abi score an invite to cousin Ruby's exclusive - and air conditioned - sleepover. But with Ruby hosting, sleep is definitely not on the agenda. Meanwhile, Marlon and John Lu hatch a plan to raid the all-girl slumber party.
15	"How to Party Like Chandra"	12 February 2010
Indie's been invited to a super exclusive high school party, but first she needs Chandra to teach her how to be a rebellious teenager so she can sneak out to it. Meanwhile, Abi breaks her glasses and Marlon takes over as her "eyes".
16	"How to Make the Most Out of Being a Host"	19 February 2010
Indie's Jekyll and Hyde cousin from India, Baldev, is making her life miserable - and everyone wants her to be more like him! Meanwhile, Abi gets trapped in the new mascot suit for the Hut - and has to spend the day as a giant hot dog.
17	"How to Get Gotten"	26 February 2010
Parenting an egg, what could be easier?! But Indie gets stuck taking care of her annoying neighbour, Todd Tash, instead. Meanwhile, Abi and Marlon have to parent an egg together - a disaster in the making.
18	"How to be a Hit on TV"	3 March 2010
When Ruby's family makes a splash on TV, Indie attempts to one-up her evil cousin - with surprising results. Meanwhile, Abi struggles with the Hut's new hire, the amazingly lazy Chandra.
19	"How to Pass the Smell Test"	12 March 2010
Indie's parents have gone crazy for mothballs and now that's all anyone can smell every time she enters a room. To make matters worse, Carlos Martinelli is looking for someone new to make fun of. Meanwhile, Abi becomes an out of control hall monitor.
20	"How to Cement the Win"	19 March 2010
In a desperate bid to save fave teacher Ms. Nunes' job, Indie and Abi help Marlon try to win the school science fair - and it gets them into a super-sticky situation with Carlos Martinelli. Meanwhile, AJ challenges his nemesis Mike O'Donnell to a Thrash Attack air guitar showdown - in public!
21	"How to Not Get Crushed by Your Crush"	16 April 2010
It's Valentine's Day and Indie's finally going to express her feelings to Chad Tash! Meanwhile, AJ and Chuck plan to have an Anti-Valentine's Day rally.
22	"How to Fight For Your Rights"	16 April 2010
How can Indie prove her strength in karate class when Chad Tash makes her weak at the knees? Meanwhile, Marlon attempts to get through life without Abi's advice.
23	"How to Manage Your Moms"	23 April 2010
Indie and Abi are chosen to organize the eighth grade dance - but will they be able to get around their meddling moms to pull it off? Meanwhile, Marlon brings his action movie obsession into his real life - with mixed results.
24	"How to Have the Last Laugh"	30 April 2010
When she tries to keep her mother from reading her diary, Indie accidentally puts her most private, personal thoughts on display in the worst way possible. Meanwhile, Abi's chosen as the teacher's pet, but can she keep the position when everything seems stacked against her?
25	"How to Be Mum's Number One"	6 May 2010
It's a birthday battle to the death when Indie, Chandra and AJ try to outdo each other on Mom's special day. Meanwhile, can Marlon use a life-sized photo of himself to get out of detention, and more?
26	"How to Beat Father Time"	13 May 2010
Indie needs to find something special to put into the school's super-awesome time capsule, while at the same time getting out of her Dad's super-boring World Cup of Cricket lessons. Meanwhile, AJ gets his geek on as Coach Wexler's IT guy.

=== Season 2 (2010–11) ===
No.	Title	Original release date	Prod. code
27	"How to Put Your Best Foot Forward"	11 October 2010	201
Indie puts her 'best foot forward' after being teased by Ruby and her siblings and Abi hires a new assistant, Dre.
28	"How to Be Thankful"	4 November 2010	202
Indie realizes after being interviewed by a clueless reporter about her bizarre Thanksgiving feast, Indie must show the reporter that she can celebrate a normal Thanksgiving celebration with her family and friends.
29	"How to Beat the Lie and Win the Guy"	11 November 2010	203
Indie puts on a fake cast on and accidentally falls in love with Aiden, who was a cast just like her.
30	"How to Make the Most Out of the Most Likely List"	18 November 2010	204
Indie tries to change her listing on the school most likely list, but occurs a few problems on the way.
31	"How to Make Your Studies Social"	25 November 2010	205
Indie becomes partners with Aiden for a social studies project and must prove to her parents that she can be responsible with working for boys.
32	"How to Save the Day"	3 March 2011	206
Indie leaps into summer and the best job ever: life guard at the water park.
33	"How to Show Your Spirit"	10 March 2011	207
Things turn evil when Indie goes to Carlos for help.
34	"How to Live in Stereo"	17 March 2011	208
Indie does what it takes to have her band the Stereos play at the hut.
35	"How to Double Your Fun"	24 March 2011	209
Indie's cousin who looks just like her comes to visit, and her old enemy The Doll is back!
36	"How to Fool a Fooling Fooler"	31 March 2011	210
Indie challenges Chandra for the title of prank queen; Marlon dreads Abi's yearly prank on him.
37	"How to Fix a Friendship Fail"	7 April 2011	211
Indie needs to put her friends first in order to help Abi with her crush; Marlon wants to meet his hero, Procrastinator Guy.
38	"How to Make the Perfect Moment"	14 April 2011	212
Indie plans the perfect date with Aiden; the Zombie Walk has everyone running for their lives.
39	"How to Tame the Beast"	21 April 2011	213
Indie's got big plans to go with Aiden to the school dance, but she doesn't want to leave her best friend on the sidelines. Solution? Give Abi a makeover so she'll be irresistible! But when Abi's makeover yields some rather unexpected results, Indie realizes she's made a monstrous mistake. Will she be able to save the school dance... for everyone? Meanwhile, AJ gets caught up in a seriously uncool wizard role-playing game. Can Dre and Marlon save him without getting sucked into the game themselves?
40	"How to Be the Hero"	12 May 2011	214
Indie wants to be more like AJ, but will she cheat her way into the program? Note: Starting this episode and all the other episodes after this episode, is being promoted as season 3.
41	"How to Break a Record"	8 September 2011	215
On a mission to build the world's biggest recycling sculpture, Indie takes things too far, barking orders left and right until there's no one left to bark at. Can Indie break a record all alone? Or will her latest idea for a record actually break the school? Meanwhile, awkwardness blooms when Abi accidentally says "I love you"... to AJ!
42	"How to Make a Christmas Miracle"	15 September 2011	216
Indie loves Christmas so much she vows to keep her spirit alive all year. But it isn't easy when everything and everyone seems out to squash her fa-la-la . Meanwhile, Abi and Marlon make a new years resolution bet that has them tied up in knots and living their nightmares.
43	"How to Get Plugged In"	22 September 2011	217
Indie matches fire with fire when she swears in front of her parents while fighting with Chandra over the TV remote.
44	"How to Be Better Than Chandra"	29 September 2011	218
Indie's done with being second banana to her super-talented sister. For once, she's going to outshine Chandra. But how? With Flamenco dancing lessons! But when things between the sisters get super-competitive, not everybody's dancing to Indie's tune. Meanwhile, Marlon's mom enrolls him in a mentoring program so he can learn to be a man, and his mentor... is Dre!
45	"How to Get Out of Big, Big Trouble"	13 October 2011	219
Indie discovers she's grounded – but her folks won't tell her why! Indie needs to solve this mystery, but her parents are tough nuts to crack. Worse, a fact-finding mission under Mum and Dad's bed goes painfully awry, resulting in more grounding! How can she get out of the punishment spiral? Meanwhile, Dre lands the prize role in a local play. Unfortunately, another actor has his eye on the prize, too.
46	"How to Be a Leader"	14 October 2011	220
When Indie uses her connections to best her cousin in a race to be volleyball captain, things take an unexpected turn for the sunny, and Indie will be lucky if she and her team get out without getting burned. Meanwhile, Abi and Marlon are trapped in class with the world's clumsiest shop teacher.
47	"How to Update Your Status"	17 October 2011	221
Indie wants to know exactly what her and Aiden's relationship status is: how serious are they? But the harder Indie pushes to get Aiden to fess up, the further she pushes him away. Can Indie lighten things up with a dose of comedy? Or will her efforts have him rolling in the aisles... in pain? Meanwhile, Marlon has to sell a box of candy bars for a school fundraiser. Unfortunately, his best customer is himself...
48	"How to Bend the Rules"	18 October 2011	222
Indie wants to go with Aiden on a field trip to a local amusement park. But even after Indie follows all of her parents' rules and acts like an angel to reach her dream, some devilish complications get in her way. Will she figure out which rules to bend and which ones to break? Meanwhile, Marlon is principal for the day and he has some big, BIG plans.
49	"How to Fake Your Way Through a Freaky Formal"	19 October 2011	223
When Chandra twists her ankle, she needs someone to take her place at her high-school masquerade formal: Indie! But can she learn Chandra's high-heel wearing, soul-crushing ways in time? And can she fool Chandra's dreamy boyfriend, Raj? Meanwhile, Marlon has plans to kick Dre's butt at ping-pong – at the same time he has his first-ever date with Dotty. Can Marlon win the game without losing the girl?
50	"How to Clean Up At Stand Up"	20 October 2011	224
When Indie takes on Carlos Martinelli and his cruel jokes, it's no laughing matter. And even Indie's super-funny family can't save her. Meanwhile, part of Marlon's past has returned to haunt him, in the form of Health & Hygiene video star: Scrawny Donny.
51	"How to Have a Movie Magic Vacation"	21 October 2011	225
When Indie discovers Aiden's family will be in Niagara Falls at the same time hers will be, the scheming – and singing – begins. But when Mum and Dad discover her plans to meet Aiden by the falls, the vacation falls apart. Can Indie and her pals muster the magic of a Bollywood musical in time to save the day, and her date? See Indie and her friends sing, dance, and laugh their way through this special musical episode.
52	"How to Get Smooched"	24 October 2011	226
When Aiden invites Indie to a movie, it looks like a smooch is in her future! But when her friendships suffer as a result of her first kiss fever, technology comes to the rescue. Meanwhile, AJ fashions a robot waiter that looks just like Dre so that his friend can have the day off.

== Awards ==
How to Be Indie was nominated for a Gemini Award in the category of "Best Writing in a Children's or Youth Program or Series" for the episode "How to Get Plugged In".
