= 28th Young Artist Awards =

Film and television awards in Los Angeles

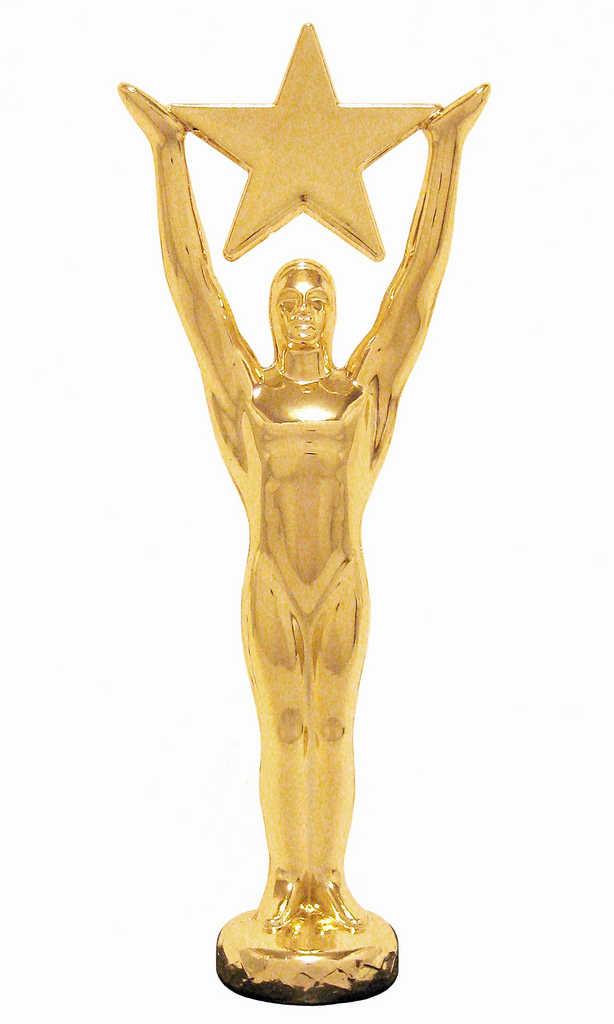
- Awarded for: Achievement in 2006 in film and television
- Date: March 10, 2007
- Site: Sportsmen's Lodge; Studio City, Los Angeles, California
- Hosted by: Joanna "JoJo" Levesque, Chloë Grace Moretz, Elle Fanning and Abigail Breslin

The 28th Young Artist Awards ceremony, presented by the Young Artist Association, honored excellence of young performers under the age of 21 in the fields of film and television for the year 2006, and took place on March 10, 2007, at the Sportsmen's Lodge in Studio City, Los Angeles, California.

Established in 1978 by long-standing Hollywood Foreign Press Association member, Maureen Dragone, the Young Artist Association was the first organization to establish an awards ceremony specifically set to recognize and award the contributions of performers under the age of 21 in the fields of film, television, theater and music.

== Categories ==
★ Bold indicates the winner in each category.

== Best Performance in a Feature Film ==
=== Best Performance in a Feature Film - Leading Young Actor ===
★ Logan Lerman - Hoot - New Line Cinema

- Thomas Sangster - Nanny McPhee - Universal Pictures
- Conor Donovan - Twelve and Holding - Echo Lake Productions
- Alex Neuberger - Running Scared - Media 8 Entertainment
- Cameron Bright - Running Scared - Media 8 Entertainment
- Josh Hutcherson - RV - Columbia/Sony

=== Best Performance in a Feature Film - Leading Young Actress ===
★ Keke Palmer - Akeelah and the Bee - Lionsgate

- Sara Paxton - Aquamarine - Fox 2000 Pictures
- Dakota Fanning - Charlotte's Web - Paramount Pictures
- Brie Larson - Hoot - New Line Cinema
- Emily Rios - Quinceañera - Sony Pictures
- Keisha Castle-Hughes - The Nativity Story - New Line Cinema

=== Best Performance in a Feature Film - Supporting Young Actor ===
★ Tristan Lake Leabu - Superman Returns - Warner Bros.

- Cameron Bright - X-Men: The Last Stand - 20th Century Fox
- Rory Culkin - The Night Listener - Miramax Films
- Connor Paolo - World Trade Center - Paramount Pictures
- Chase Ellison - End of the Spear - Every Tribe Entertainment
- Troy Gentile - Nacho Libre - Paramount Pictures
- Josh Flitter - Big Momma's House 2 - 20th Century Fox

=== Best Performance in a Feature Film - Supporting Young Actress ===
★ Emma Roberts - Aquamarine - Fox 2000 Pictures

- Zoe Weizenbaum - Twelve and Holding - Echo Lake Productions
- Joanna "JoJo" Levesque - Aquamarine - Fox 2000 Pictures
- Hallie Kate Eisenberg - How to Eat Fried Worms - Kragen Productions
- Hannah Marks - Accepted - Universal Pictures
- Lucy Boynton - Miss Potter - MGM
- Alyson Stoner - Step Up - Buena Vista Pictures

=== Best Performance in a Feature Film - Young Actor Age Ten or Younger ===
★ Dylan Blue - Deck the Halls - 20th Century Fox

- Seamus Davey-Fitzpatrick - The Omen - 20th Century Fox
- Jimmy Bennett - Firewall - Warner Bros.
- Noah Gray-Cabey - Lady in the Water - Warner Bros.
- Jake Johnson - Talladega Nights: The Ballad of Ricky Bobby - Sony
- Nathan Gamble - Babel - Paramount Pictures
- Jake Cherry - Night at the Museum - 20th Century Fox

=== Best Performance in a Feature Film - Young Actress Age Ten or Younger ===
★ Abigail Breslin - Little Miss Sunshine - Fox Searchlight Pictures

- Tatum McCann - Click - Columbia Pictures
- Ryan Newman - Zoom - Revolution Studios
- Chloë Grace Moretz - Big Momma's House 2 - 20th Century Fox
- Elle Fanning - Babel - Paramount Pictures
- Sage Kermes - Sweet Land - Beautiful Motion Pictures

=== Best Performance in a Feature Film - Young Ensemble Cast ===
★ How to Eat Fried Worms - New Line Cinema

Luke Benward, Hallie Kate Eisenberg, Alexander Gould, Adam Hicks, Ryan Malgarini, Ty Panitz, Philip Daniel Bolden, Blake Garrett, Andrew Gillingham, Austin Rogers, Nick Krause, Stephan Bender and Alexander Agate.

- Nanny McPhee - Universal Pictures

Thomas Sangster, Eliza Bennett, Raphaël Coleman, Jennifer Rae Daykin, Holly Gibbs and Samuel Honywood

- The Santa Clause 3: The Escape Clause - Disney

Ridge Canipe, Kate Emerick, Madeline Carroll, Eric Lloyd, Spencer Breslin, Liliana Mumy, Darian Bryant, Chantel Valdivieso, Ryan Heinke and Charlie Stewart

- Unaccompanied Minors - Warner Bros.

Tyler James Williams, Dyllan Christopher, Dominique Saldana, Gina Mantegna, Quinn Shephard and Brett Kelly

== Best Performance in an International Feature Film ==
=== Best Performance in an International Feature Film - Leading Young Actor or Actress ===
★ Sarala Kariyawasam (Sri Lanka) - Water - Fox Searchlight

- Ivana Baquero (Spain) - Pan's Labyrinth - Warner Bros.
- Alex Pettyfer (England) - Stormbreaker - The Weinstein Company
- Freddie Highmore (England) - Arthur and the Invisibles - MGM
- Nansal Balitguluum (Mongolia) - The Cave of the Yellow Dog - Schesch Filmproduktion
- Jonathan Mason (England) - Lassie - Samuel Goldwyn Company
- Dmitry Martynov (Russia) - Night Watch - Fox Searchlight
- Jhenbo Yang (China) - Riding Alone for Thousands of Miles - Sony Pictures Classics

== Best Performance in a Short Film ==
=== Best Performance in a Short Film - Young Actor ===
★ Hunter Gomez - Rocketboy

- Dominic Scott Kay - Saving Angelo - Bigel Entertainment
- Benjamin B. Smith - The Saddest Boy in the World
- Sean Roche - Happy Valentine's Day
- Kendall McCulty - The Crossing
- Ricardo Gray - Adam's Eve
- Paul Butcher - Imaginary Friend - Greendot Films

=== Best Performance in a Short Film - Young Actress ===
★ Megan McKinnon - Little Samantha Tripp

- Kendra McCulty - The Crossing
- Mia Ford - Imaginary Friend - Greendot Films
- Courtney Halverson - Sleepwalk - MH Pictures
- Kali Majors - Bye Bye Benjamin - AFI

== Best Performance in a TV Movie, Miniseries or Special ==
=== Best Performance in a TV Movie, Miniseries or Special - Young Actor ===
★ Matthew Knight - Candles on Bay Street - CBS

- Zac Efron - High School Musical - Walt Disney Pictures
- Jason Dolley - Read It and Weep - Disney Channel
- Micah Williams - The Ron Clark Story - TNT
- Brandon Smith - The Ron Clark Story - TNT

=== Best Performance in a TV Movie, Miniseries or Special - Young Actress ===
★ Hannah Hodson - The Ron Clark Story - TNT

- Vanessa Anne Hudgens - High School Musical - Walt Disney Pictures
- Sammi Hanratty - Hello Sister, Goodbye Life - ABC Family
- Kay Panabaker - Read It and Weep - Disney Channel
- Maya Ritter - Molly: An American Girl on the Homefront - Disney Channel

=== Best Performance in a TV Movie, Miniseries or Special - Supporting Young Actor ===
★ Jake Smith - For the Love of a Child - Lifetime

- Corbin Bleu - High School Musical - Walt Disney Pictures
- Beans El-Balawi - Half Light - TNT
- Jonah Meyerson - Griffin and Phoenix - Lifetime
- Andrew Chalmers - Molly: An American Girl on the Homefront - Disney Channel
- Benjamin Petry - The Lost Room - Sci-Fi Channel

=== Best Performance in a TV Movie, Miniseries or Special - Supporting Young Actress ===
★ Emily Hirst - For the Love of a Child - Lifetime

- Niamh Wilson - The House Next Door - Lifetime
- Tory Green - Molly: An American Girl on the Homefront - Disney Channel
- Elle Fanning - The Lost Room - Sci-Fi Channel

== Best Performance in a TV Series ==
=== Best Performance in a TV Series - Leading Young Actor ===
★ Kyle Massey - That's So Raven - Disney Channel

- Cole Sprouse - The Suite Life of Zack & Cody - Disney Channel
- Tyler James Williams - Everybody Hates Chris - UPN
- Michael Seater - Life with Derek - Disney Channel
- Dylan Sprouse - The Suite Life of Zack & Cody - Disney Channel
- Devon Werkheiser - Ned's Declassified School Survival Guide - Nickelodeon
- Jamie Johnston - Degrassi: The Next Generation - CTV

=== Best Performance in a TV Series - Leading Young Actress ===
★ Christa B. Allen - Cake - CBS

- Ashley Leggat - Life with Derek - Disney Channel
- Emma Roberts - Unfabulous - Nickelodeon
- Jamie Lynn Spears - Zoey 101 - Nickelodeon
- Miley Cyrus - Hannah Montana - Disney Channel

=== Best Performance in a TV Series - Supporting Young Actor ===
★ Alexander Gould - Weeds - Showtime

- Daniel Magder - Life with Derek - Disney Channel
- Andrew Chalmers - Darcy's Wild Life - Discovery Kids
- Daniel Curtis Lee - Ned's Declassified School Survival Guide - Nickelodeon
- Paul Butcher - Zoey 101 - Nickelodeon
- Dean Collins - The War at Home - FOX
- Jesse Plemons - Friday Night Lights - NBC

=== Best Performance in a TV Series - Supporting Young Actress ===
★ Hayden Panettiere - Heroes - NBC

- Miranda Cosgrove - Drake & Josh - Nickelodeon
- Victoria Justice - Zoey 101 - Nickelodeon
- Emily Osment - Hannah Montana - Disney Channel
- Allie Grant - Weeds - Showtime
- Mackenzie Rosman - 7th Heaven - CW
- Aimee Teegarden - Friday Night Lights - NBC

=== Best Performance in a TV Series - Young Actor Age Ten or Younger ===
★ Noah Gray-Cabey - Heroes - NBC

- Trevor Gagnon - The New Adventures of Old Christine - CBS
- Allen Alvarado - Flight 29 Down - NBC
- Khamani Griffin - All of Us - CW
- Lorenzo Brino and Nikolas Brino - 7th Heaven - CW
- CJ Sanders - Saved - TNT

=== Best Performance in a TV Series - Young Actress Age Ten or Younger ===
★ Maria Lark - Medium - NBC

- Ariel Gade - Invasion - ABC
- Ariel Waller - Life with Derek - Disney Channel
- Billi Bruno - According to Jim - ABC
- Conchita Campbell - The 4400 - USA
- Emily Everhard - Cake - CBS

=== Best Performance in a TV Series - Guest Starring Young Actor ===
★ Darian Weiss - Without a Trace - CBS

- Gavin Fink - E-Ring - NBC
- Alec Holden - The Unit - CBS
- Colby Paul - Supernatural - Warner Bros.
- Kolawole Obileye - Lost - ABC
- Kyle Kaplan - The Bernie Mac Show - FOX
- Skyler Gisondo - House M.D. - FOX
- Joseph Castanon - Shark - CBS
- Remy Thorne - Las Vegas - NBC
- Austin Majors - According to Jim - ABC

=== Best Performance in a TV Series - Guest Starring Young Actress ===
★ Monet Monico - The Suite Life of Zack & Cody - Disney Channel

- Alyson Stoner - The Suite Life of Zack & Cody - Disney Channel
- Emily Hirst - Smallville - CW
- Sammi Hanratty - The Suite Life of Zack & Cody - Disney Channel
- Tay Blessey - Cold Case - CBS
- Chloë Grace Moretz - Desperate Housewives - ABC
- Rachel Rogers - Monk - USA

=== Best Performance in a TV Series - Recurring Young Actor ===
★ Daniel Goldman - Dexter - Showtime

- Louis T. Moyle - My Name Is Earl - NBC
- Noah Crawford - My Name Is Earl - NBC
- Masam Holden - ER - NBC
- Kasey Campbell - Weeds - Showtime
- Jacob Kraemer - Naturally, Sadie - Disney Channel
- Tyler Patrick Jones - The Ghost Whisperer - CBS
- Cody Linley - Hannah Montana - Disney Channel
- Charlie Stewart - The Suite Life of Zack & Cody - Disney Channel
- Adam Cagley - Ned's Declassified School Survival Guide - Nickelodeon
- Marc Donato - Degrassi: The Next Generation - CTV

=== Best Performance in a TV Series - Recurring Young Actress ===
★ Darcy Rose Byrnes - The Young and the Restless - CBS

- Kirsten Prout - Kyle XY - ABC Family
- Tay Blessey - Crossing Jordan - NBC
- Rachel G. Fox - Desperate Housewives - ABC
- Courtney Jines - The War at Home - FOX
- Morgan York - Hannah Montana - Disney Channel
- Sophie Oda - The Suite Life of Zack & Cody - Disney Channel

=== Best Young Ensemble Performance in a TV Series (Comedy or Drama) ===
★ Zoey 101 - Nickelodeon

Jamie Lynn Spears, Paul Butcher, Sean Flynn, Victoria Justice, Christopher Massey, Alexa Nikolas, Erin Sanders and Matthew Underwood

- Unfabulous - Nickelodeon

Jordan Calloway, Malese Jow, Emma Roberts, Chelsea Tavares, Emma Degerstedt, Dustin Ingram and Mary Lou

- Life with Derek - Disney Channel

Michael Seater, Ashley Leggat, Daniel Magder, Jordan Todosey and Ariel Waller

- Darcy's Wild Life - Discovery Kids/Discovery Communications

Andrew Chalmers, Shannon Collis, Melanie Leishman, Demetrius Joyette, Sara Paxton and Kerry Michael Saxena

== Best Performance in a Voice-Over Role ==
=== Best Performance in a Voice-Over Role - Young Actor ===
★ Dominic Scott Kay - Charlotte's Web - Paramount Pictures

- Sam Lerner - Monster House - Sony Pictures
- Anthony Ghannam - Bambi II - Disney
- Mitchel Musso - Monster House - Sony Pictures
- Shane Baumel - Curious George - Universal Pictures
- Alexander Gould - Curious George - Universal Pictures
- Jake T. Austin - Everyone's Hero - 20th Century Fox

=== Best Performance in a Voice-Over Role - Young Actress ===
★ Tajja Isen - Jane and the Dragon - YTV

- Spencer Locke - Monster House - Sony Pictures
- Hailey Noelle Johnson - Curious George - Universal Pictures
- Alyssa Shafer - Happy Feet - Warner Bros.
- Mikaila Baumel - Happy Feet - Warner Bros.

== Best Family Entertainment ==
=== Best Family Television Movie or Special ===
★ The Ron Clark Story - TNT

- High School Musical - Disney Channel
- Hello Sister, Goodbye Life - ABC Family
- Candles on Bay Street - Hallmark/CBS
- Molly: An American Girl on the Homefront - Disney Channel
- For the Love of a Child - Lifetime

=== Best Family Television Series (Drama) ===
★ Friday Night Lights - NBC

- Invasion - ABC
- Saved - TNT
- Flight 29 Down - Discovery Kids
- 7th Heaven - CW
- Brothers and Sisters - ABC
- The Ghost Whisperer - CBS

=== Best Family Television Series (Comedy) ===
★ The Suite Life of Zack & Cody - Disney Channel

- Darcy's Wild Life - Discovery Kids
- Ned's Declassified School Survival Guide - Nickelodeon
- Unfabulous - Nickelodeon
- Zoey 101 - Nickelodeon
- My Name Is Earl - NBC

=== Best International Family Feature Film ===
★ Water (Sri Lanka)

- Stormbreaker (England)
- Arthur and the Invisibles (France)
- The Cave of the Yellow Dog (Mongolia)
- Lassie (England)
- Pan's Labyrinth (Spain)
- Riding Alone for Thousands of Miles (China)

=== Best Family Feature Film (Animation) ===
★ Curious George - Universal Pictures

- Barnyard - Paramount
- Cars - Walt Disney
- Flushed Away - DreamWorks/Aardman
- Happy Feet - Warner Bros.
- Ice Age: The Meltdown - 20th Century Fox
- Open Season - Sony Pictures
- Over the Hedge - DreamWorks

=== Best Family Feature Film (Comedy or Musical) ===
★ Little Miss Sunshine - Fox Searchlight

- Nanny McPhee - Universal Pictures
- Click - Columbia Pictures
- How to Eat Fried Worms - New Line Cinema
- Talladega Nights: The Ballad of Ricky Bobby - Sony Pictures
- Hoot - New Line Cinema
- Charlotte's Web - Paramount

=== Best Family Feature Film (Drama) ===
★ Akeelah and the Bee - Lionsgate

- Pirates of the Caribbean: Dead Man's Chest - Walt Disney
- Superman Returns - Warner Bros.
- Loverboy - Millennium Films
- X-Men: The Last Stand - 20th Century Fox
- The Nativity Story - New Line Cinema
- Flicka - 20th Century Fox

== Special awards ==
=== Outstanding Young Original Blues-Rock Artist ===
★ Grant Austin Taylor - Musician/Songwriter

=== Outstanding Young International Variety Group ===
★ Street Magic (Russian: Волшебники двора, Volshebniki Dvora) - Voronezh, Russia

=== Michael Landon Award ===
==== Inspiration to Youth Through Television ====
★ Dog Whisperer with Cesar Millan - National Geographic Channel

=== Jackie Coogan Award ===
==== Contribution to Youth Through Motion Pictures ====
===== Promoting the value of family =====
★ Will Smith and Jaden Smith - The Pursuit of Happyness

=== Social Relations of Knowledge Institute Award ===
==== Best TV Program or Movie ====
===== Furthering the Interest of Youth in Science =====
★ Good Eats with Alton Brown - Food Network
