= Degrassi season 10 =

Degrassi
- Season 10
- Degrassi Season 10 DVD
- Showrunner: Brendon Yorke
- No. of episodes: 44

Release
- Original network: MuchMusic (Canada); TeenNick (United States)
- Original release: July 19, 2010 – April 22, 2011

Season chronology
- ← Previous; Season 9 Next → Season 11

The tenth season of the Canadian teen drama television series Degrassi, formerly known as Degrassi: The Next Generation, premiered in Canada on July 19, 2010, concluded on April 22, 2011, and consists of 44 episodes. Due to the titular "next generation" of students having been written out by this time, the suffix was dropped. With the start of the tenth season, the series survived longer than the nine-year gap between the Degrassi High telemovie School's Out (1992) and The Next Generation's premiere episode "Mother and Child Reunion" (2001).

Though only two school years have passed in the story timeline since season six, season ten is set from the fall semester through the first term of the spring semester, in which the years it aired. Writers were able to use a semi-floating timeline, so that the issues depicted are modern for their viewers. This season depicts the lives of a group of high school sophomores, juniors, seniors, and graduates as they deal with some of the challenges and issues that teenagers face such as domestic violence, dysfunctional families, self image, bullying, sexual harassment, gender identity/transsexualism, teenage pregnancy, online predators, homophobia, school violence, divorce, religion, kidney failure, self-harm, alcoholism, sexual identity, financial difficulties, running away and relationships.

This season doubled the order of episodes, and switched to a telenovela/soap opera format, with the show airing new episodes four days a week, for the first 24 episodes. Production for the season began on March 26, 2010 at Epitome Pictures' studios in Toronto, Ontario. This was the first season not to air on broadcast television. It is also the first season to have simultaneous airings in Canada and the United States. This was the earliest start to a season. In the US, the first 24 episodes of season ten were promoted as Degrassi: The Boiling Point, while the final twelve episodes of the season were promoted as Degrassi: In Too Deep. The fifth Degrassi-dedicated soundtrack, Degrassi: The Boiling Point, was released February 1, 2011.

== Cast and characters ==
The tenth season features twenty-four actors who receive star billing, with sixteen of them returning from the previous season. Joining the main cast are Munro Chambers (Eli), Cory Lee (Ms. Oh), Spencer Van Wyck (Wesley), Jordan Todosey (Adam), Alicia Josipovic (Bianca) and Luke Bilyk (Drew), replacing Miriam McDonald (Emma), Cassie Steele (Manny), Dalmar Abuzeid (Danny), Shane Kippel (Spinner), Natty Zavitz (Bruce the Moose), Scott Paterson (Johnny), Jordan Hudyma (Blue) and Paula Brancati (Jane). Midway through the season, Shannon Kook-Chun (Zane) and Daniel Kelly (Owen) replace Jamie Johnston (Peter) and Judy Jiao (Leia).

=== Main cast ===
- Jamie Johnston as Peter Stone (Note: Appears in the opening credits from episodes 1–24 only.) (4 episodes)
- Raymond Ablack as Savtaj "Sav" Bhandari (33 episodes)
- Aislinn Paul as Clare Edwards (35 episodes)
- Munro Chambers as Eli Goldsworthy (27 episodes)
- Annie Clark as Fiona Coyne (26 episodes)
- Landon Liboiron as Declan Coyne (9 episodes)
- Judy Jiao as Leia Chang (2 episodes)
- Charlotte Arnold as Holly J. Sinclair (33 episodes)
- Cory Lee as Ms. Oh (25 episodes)
- Spencer Van Wyck as Wesley Betenkamp (28 episodes)
- A.J. Saudin as Connor DeLaurier (20 episodes)
- Samantha Munro as Anya MacPherson (27 episodes)
- Jajube Mandiela as Chantay Black (19 episodes)
- Jessica Tyler as Jenna Middleton (24 episodes)
- Jahmil French as Dave Turner (29 episodes)
- Jordan Todosey as Adam Torres (25 episodes)
- Alicia Josipovic as Bianca DeSousa (19 episodes)
- Sam Earle as K.C. Guthrie (25 episodes)
- Stefan Brogren as Archie "Snake" Simpson (20 episodes)
- Luke Bilyk as Drew Torres (26 episodes)
- Argiris Karras as Riley Stavros (13 episodes)
- Melinda Shankar as Alli Bhandari (31 episodes)
- Shannon Kook-Chun as Zane Park (Note: Appears in the opening credits from episodes 24–44 only.) (13 episodes)
- Daniel Kelly as Owen Milligan (12 episodes)

Former series regular Scott Paterson appears as Johnny DiMarco in a guest appearance.

Cast notes

== Crew ==
Season ten was produced by Epitome Pictures in association with Much/CTV. Funding was provided by The Canadian Media Fund, RBC Royal Bank, The Shaw Rocket Fund, The Independent Production Fund: Mountain Cable Program, The Canadian Film or Video Production Tax Credit, and the Ontario Film and Television Tax Credit.

Linda Schuyler, co-creator of the Degrassi franchise and CEO of Epitome Pictures, served as an executive producer with her husband, and President of Epitome Pictures, Stephen Stohn. Brendon Yorke is also credited as an executive producer, and Sarah Glinski is credited as a co-executive producer. David Lowe and Stefan Brogren are the producers, and Stephanie Williams the supervising producer. The casting director is Stephanie Gorin, and the editors are Jason B. Irvine, Gordon Thorne, and Paul Whitehead.

The executive story editors are Duana Taha and Matt Huether, the story editors are Michael Grassi and Cole Bastedo, and Lauren Gosnell is the story coordinator. Episode writers for the season are Cole Bastedo, Sarah Glinski, Michael Grassi, Matt Huether, James Hurst, Vera Santamaria, Shelly Scarrow, Duana Taha, and Brendon Yorke. The director of photography is Alwyn Kumst, and the directors are Mario Azzopardi, Stefan Brogren, Phil Earnshaw, Sturla Gunnarsson, Eleanore Lindo, Samir Rehem, Stefan Scaini, and Pat Williams.

== Episodes ==
The first run, of 24 episodes, began after the feature-length film Degrassi Takes Manhattan in July 2010, and ran for six weeks. This is also the first season that the episodes aired on the same nights in Canada and the United States, with the exception being the first week, when the United States was one day behind Canada. This is the first time that the opening credits have been revised halfway through the season, and was repeated for season 11 and 12.

No. overall	No. in season	Title	Canada airdate	U.S. airdate	Prod. code
189	1	"What a Girl Wants" Part One	July 19, 2010	July 20, 2010	1001
It's a new year at Degrassi, and there has been many changes over a short summer. Holly J. Rerurns to Degrassi for her senior year with a mission to be student council president, but when Sav decides to run against her, Holly J. grows worried when he proves to be popular among the students. Meanwhile, Fiona prepares for a drama-free school year until the new man in her life, Bobby, is not who he seems. Also, Dave makes a list of the hottest Degrassi girls to impress Alli, but there is an error in the computer programming, which threatens his friendship with Ali.
190	2	"What a Girl Wants" Part Two	July 20, 2010	July 21, 2010	1002
Fiona forgives Bobby for hitting her until she finds out he is cheating on her with his ex-girlfriend, Tinsley. Feeling alone, she is left with a difficult decision. Meanwhile, Holly J. enlists Anya to fake a pregnancy in order to make Sav quit the election. However, Sav uses it to his benefit and vows to Anya that he will be there for her while she's "carrying" his child. Also, in order to exact revenge, Alli decides to make a "Biggest Losers" list and puts Dave at the top.
191	3	"Breakaway" Part One	July 21, 2010	July 22, 2010	1003
Fiona escapes New York and heads back to Toronto. Meanwhile, Anya comes clean to Sav. Also, Jenna starts a vicious rumor about after overhearing a delicate conversation between Clare and Alli.
192	4	"Breakaway" Part Two	July 22, 2010	July 23, 2010	1004
After losing the elections, Holly J feels hopeless as she has nothing to help her go to Yale. She decides to turn to SAT Prep, but after learning the price, she risks her new friendship with Fiona in order to get it. Meanwhile, Anya and Sav face the difficult decision of telling everyone that they faked her pregnancy. Also, Clare finds out about Jenna's rumor after a rather personal encounter with Wesley.
193	5	"99 Problems" Part One	July 26, 2010	July 26, 2010	1005
Riley competes with new student Drew for the first quarterback position on the football team. The competition becomes more intense after Drew hears secret conversation between Riley and Zane, which he uses as blackmail. Meanwhile, craving for the true high school experience, Ali tries out for the Spirit Squad, but quickly becomes Chantay's assistant. Also, K.C. is becoming more popular with the girls after joining the football team and triggers Jenna's jealousy.
194	6	"99 Problems" Part Two	July 27, 2010	July 27, 2010	1006
The feud between Drew and Riley reach an all-time high, putting his position on the football team and relationship with Zane in jeopardy. Meanwhile, Alli makes a dance troupe to rival the Power Squad. But it quickly backfires. Also, Jenna's jealousy gets the best of her when she searches K.C.'s phone and finds something interesting.
195	7	"Better Off Alone" Part One	July 28, 2010	July 28, 2010	1007
K.C.'s mother resurfaces back into his life, and KC learns the reason why, which upsets him more than excites him. Meanwhile, in English class, Clare's struggles with writing about non-vampire topics leads her to a writing partner, Eli, who convinces her to break out of her shell and express herself. Also, Alli asks Dave for guy advice, but he misunderstands which guy she means.
196	8	"Better Off Alone" Part Two	July 29, 2010	July 29, 2010	1008
K.C.'s resistance at moving back in with his mother leads to lashing out at the wrong people, and the person who helps him pick up the pieces is the last person he expects. Meanwhile, when she is worried that her parents might be heading for divorce, Eli convinces Clare to express her feelings through her writing. Also, Alli considers Drew to be her boyfriend, but that might be news to him.
197	9	"I Just Don't Know What to Do with Myself" Part One	August 2, 2010	August 2, 2010	1009
Sav desperately tries to prove to his parents that he is responsible enough to go to a concert but runs into unforeseen circumstances. Meanwhile, Jenna obsesses over her weight for the upcoming Power Squad Calendar photo shoot when she can't fit into her uniform. Also, Fiona's loneliness leads her to an unlikely companion.
198	10	"I Just Don't Know What to Do with Myself" Part Two	August 3, 2010	August 3, 2010	1010
Tired of his parents' strict rules, Sav comes up with the perfect plan in order to take his father's truck out to the concert with Adam and Eli. Meanwhile, Jenna tries diet pills and suffers humiliating results. Also, Fiona's pet pig Porcelina messes up her apartment.
199	11	"Try Honesty" Part One	August 4, 2010	August 4, 2010	1011
Declan plans a road trip to Yale University, but Holly J. who is still broke can't afford it. Their relationship is put to the test when she finds a picture of him cozied up with Tinsley. Meanwhile, Eli gets himself involved in a feud with school bully, Fitz. Also, Dave, Wesley and Connor form a band as a way to get girls, but they soon run into an unexpected problem.
200	12	"Try Honesty" Part Two	August 5, 2010	August 5, 2010	1012
Declan returns to town and begins offering financial help to Holly J. But when she starts to feel like a kept woman, Holly J. must choose between her relationship with Declan and her self-respect. Meanwhile, Eli puts his plan for revenge into effect, starting a war between him and Fitz. Also, Connor and Wesley enlist Sav's help in auto-tuning Dave's horrible singing. Note: This is the 200th episode in The Next Generation series, and the number 200 was said in dialogue three times.
201	13	"You Don't Know My Name" Part One	August 9, 2010	August 9, 2010	1013
Alli wants to be in an official relationship with Drew, and in order to prove that she is worthy of being his girlfriend, she does his history assignment for him. Sav and Holly J work together on a dance for Above the Dot, and realize that they may have feelings for each other. Connor met a girl over the internet during a RPG game.
202	14	"You Don't Know My Name" Part Two	August 10, 2010	August 10, 2010	1014
Drew realizes how much he likes Alli and attempts to win her back when she starts playing hard to get. Holly J tries to be platonic with Sav, but her heart tells hersomething else. Wesly and Dave are in for a shock when they find out the actual woman that Connor plans on meeting.
203	15	"My Body Is a Cage" Part One	August 11, 2010	August 11, 2010	1015
Adam just wants to be a normal boy in high school but soon realizes that it will be impossible when his classmates start finding out that he is a trans boy. Leia convinces a suspicious Anya to believe that her mother is having an affair but discovers that it's even worse. Dave attempts to get on Ms. Oh's good side and decides to do a little research on her. Guest star: Jean-Marc Généreux as gym instructor.
204	16	"My Body Is a Cage" Part Two	August 12, 2010	August 12, 2010	1016
After realizing what his life would now be like, Adam appeases his family and fellow students by detransitioning back into "Gracie," which unbeknownst to them brings back a harmful old habit. Meanwhile, Anya struggles with finding out that her mother has cancer, which comes at a bad time when she has to do a project with two people whom she doesn't want to see: Sav and Holly J. Also, Dave wonders what is wrong with Ms. Oh. Note: This episode marks the final appearance of Judy Jiao as Leia Chang. This is the 300th episode in the Degrassi franchise. Guest star: Jean-Marc Généreux as gym instructor.
205	17	"Tears Dry on Their Own" Part One	August 16, 2010	August 16, 2010	1017
Alli thinks Jenna is pregnant when she starts showing symptoms, but she is too worried about her audition for Next Teen Star to take these symptoms seriously. Connor reconnects with his older online love, which leaves Wesley and Dave worried. Riley avoids the football team and Zane and hangs out with Anya.
206	18	"Tears Dry on Their Own" Part Two	August 17, 2010	August 17, 2010	1018
Jenna finds out that she is pregnant, with both of her parents out the picture and her brother being on the road all the time, she only has KC to rely on, only to be surprised by his response. Meanwhile, Connor secretly contacts his online girlfriend and makes plans to see her. Also, Anya and Riley are both attracted to her mother's doctor and investigate to find out for which team he plays.
207	19	"Still Fighting It" Part One	August 18, 2010	August 18, 2010	1019
Riley attempts to fit in with the guys on the football team, but when he sees how "harmless" gay jokes affect Zane, he decides it's time to take a stand. Sparks fly between Eli and Clare, but Eli soon gives Clare mixed signals. In exchange for tutelage, Drew helps Wesley to be cool in order to impress Anya.
208	20	"Still Fighting It" Part Two	August 19, 2010	August 19, 2010	1020
Riley risks his renewed relationship with Zane when he violently overreacts to Owen's homophobic comments. Meanwhile, Clare is determined to get to the bottom of Eli's mysterious secret. Also, Drew tries to teach Wesley to be more confident just in time for an Eligible Bachelor's Auction at school.
209	21	"Purple Pills" Part One	August 23, 2010	August 23, 2010	1021
Fiona becomes stressed when she has to record her testimony against Bobby and self-medicates by drinking champagne, which could put the school's biggest event of the semester in jeopardy. Meanwhile, Riley is finally ready to make his relationship with Zane official, but he's afraid that coming out might ruin the mood for the upcoming football game. Also, Adam is feeling rejected by Eli, now that he is involved with Clare, and decides to befriend Fitz.
210	22	"Purple Pills" Part Two	August 24, 2010	August 24, 2010	1022
Fiona continues to drink champagne as a coping mechanism, which could ruin her deposition against Bobby and her exams. Meanwhile, Riley must decide if he's ready to be a poster boy for gay athletes when he is scouted for college football. Also, Adam doesn't like the way Fitz treats him and decides to do something about it.
211	23	"All Falls Down" Part One	August 25, 2010	August 25, 2010	1023
When Bianca begins flirting with him, Drew must decide whether to remain faithful to his girlfriend, Alli, or give into temptation. Clare has had enough of the Eli/Fitz rivalry and decides to put a stop to it. Sav and Holly J. have to convince Mr. Simpson to ignore the PTA ruling to cancel the "Night in Vegas" dance by promising to keep the event trouble-free.
212	24	"All Falls Down" Part Two	August 26, 2010	August 26, 2010	1024
Degrassi will never be the same after the "Night in Vegas" dance: two relationships will be jeopardized, two students risk everything to sneak out for a secret rendezvous, and a long-standing feud escalates into serious—possibly fatal—violence.
Part 2
213	25	"Don't Let Me Get Me" Part One	October 8, 2010	October 8, 2010	1025
When the students return from winter break, they discover that Degrassi has been subjected to a significant discipline crackdown. Meanwhile, Alli must deal with a rumor that she is a harlot at the school on Vegas night. Additionally, Jenna feels under pressure to tell a sad tale in order to win votes on Next Teen Star.
214	26	"Don't Let Me Get Me" Part Two	October 8, 2010	October 8, 2010	1026
Alli's turbulent freshman year comes back to haunt her, threatening her relationship with her parents. Jenna is currently having to deal with the idea that she will soon become a teen mother after declaring her pregnancy on Next Teen Star.
215	27	"Love Lockdown" Part One	October 15, 2010	October 15, 2010	1027
Declan has returned to Toronto from New York in order to attend the Grundy Awards and perhaps reclaim Holly J. Meanwhile, Clare's parents have decided to have the dreaded "family talk" on the same night as her first actual date with Eli. Chantay also makes an effort to maintain the Power Squad.
216	28	"Love Lockdown" Part Two	October 22, 2010	October 22, 2010	1028
Holly J. feels conflicted about what she did with Declan at his party and isn't sure if it was a stupid judgment or something much worse—like rape. Meanwhile, Clare utilizes her newfound rebelliousness and her dark boyfriend, Eli, to find common ground with her parents and bring them back together. Also, after learning about the other clubs, Chantay rallies everyone to take a stand against Mr. Simpson. Note: This episode marks the final appearance of Landon Liboiron as Declan Coyne.
217	29	"Umbrella" Part One	October 29, 2010	October 29, 2010	1029
Clare's parents are divorcing whether she likes it or not. Feeling totally uneasy and irrelevant in her own home, she's despondent, but Eli's parents have a strange offer. Meanwhile, Drew and Adam run a food drive and ask Fiona to volunteer, but both are attracted to her and try to flirt with her. Also, Dave's police officer father is stationed at Degrassi, and Wes does not understand why Dave is embarrassed.
218	30	"Umbrella" Part Two	November 5, 2010	November 5, 2010	1030
Clare and Eli's differences continue to clash, but she soon discovers the shocking answer to all of her questions about Eli. Meanwhile, Adam continues to grow jealous of the flirting between Drew and Fiona. Also, Dave will do anything he can to prove to his new friends that he is nothing like his dad, even if he hurts Wesley in the process.
219	31	"Halo" Part One	November 12, 2010	November 12, 2010	1031
Jenna feels alone in her pregnancy but finds that Sav is the one guy that is willing to give his time for her. True, he's dating Holly J., but that won't stop Jenna. Meanwhile, K.C. and Drew like the same girl. Also, Wesley and Anya plan their date, but he begins to worry about premature ejaculation after having a wet dream. And Adam tries to impress Fiona after she begins missing dances in New York.
220	32	"Halo" Part Two	November 19, 2010	November 19, 2010	1032
Jenna puts Sav and Holly J.'s relationship in jeopardy when she attempts to steal Sav away, and all the while K.C. begins having feelings for Jenna again. Meanwhile, Wesley's little problem erupts when he purchases a sexual endurance drug for his date with Anya. Meanwhile, Adam, with the help of Clare and Eli, organizes a secret party for Degrassi students with the intention of impressing Fiona.
Part 3
221	33	"When Love Takes Over" Part One	February 11, 2011	February 11, 2011	1033
It is Sweetheart Week at Degrassi. Meanwhile, Adam and Fiona begin to reconnect when he suggests she try out for a part in the school play. Also, after Anya's mother's cancer has disappeared, Anya pursues a relationship with the eight-years-older doctor. And Dave meets Sadie, and they make a date, but he finds out she is much taller than him.
222	34	"When Love Takes Over" Part Two	February 11, 2011	February 11, 2011	1034
Adam is denial when it becomes obvious that Fiona has a drinking problem and soon has to make a difficult decision regarding her health. Meanwhile, Anya begins to feel guilty when she continues to lie about her age to Dr. Chris. Also, Dave attempts to apologize to Sadie about the comments he made.
223	35	"The Way We Get By" Part One	February 18, 2011	February 18, 2011	1035
Despite helping the basketball team win, Drew finds he is not as popular with the girls as he was last semester, due to what he did with Bianca. Meanwhile, after some hesitation to do something in which Zane is interested, Riley attends an art showing with him. Also, Alli has trouble making friends at her all-girls school.
224	36	"The Way We Get By" Part Two	February 25, 2011	February 25, 2011	1036
Drew attempts to get his friends to accept Bianca, but he soon realizes that she may be as bad as everyone thinks. Meanwhile, Riley does his best to make his mother accept that he's gay. Also, Alli continues to be surprised by Malika's bad girl ways.
225	37	"Jesus, Etc." Part One	March 4, 2011	March 4, 2011	1037
A newly religious Fitz has been released from juvie and desperately wants to apologize to Clare and Eli, which causes problems in their relationship when Clare thinks Eli has become too controlling. Meanwhile, Sav has to compose an original song to submit to the Music Conservatory and needs a drummer. After choosing Drew, Sav must hide his betrayal from Alli. Also, Jenna wants to focus all of her attention on learning everything she can about babies, and KC isn't exactly helping things.
226	38	"Jesus, Etc." Part Two	March 11, 2011	March 11, 2011	1038
Fitz continues to talk to Clare about his newfound faith and sends her numerous emails throughout the night. Clare also begins to see Eli's true colors. Meanwhile, Sav is unsure if Alli's disappearance is part of an attention-seeking stunt or cause for alarm. Also, K.C. and Jenna babysit a six-year-old to test their parenting readiness.
227	39	"Hide and Seek" Part One	March 18, 2011	March 18, 2011	1039
As Holly J. and Chantay prepare to do a work study for a city councilor, Holly J. begins to feel extremely tired and sick and wonders if something is really wrong with her. Meanwhile, Alli is staying at Toronto University with her ex-boyfriend, Johnny, and makes plans to run away to Vancouver. Also, Wesley realizes that he hasn't accomplished anything he set out to do and decides to set a world record in pogo stick jumping.
228	40	"Hide and Seek" Part Two	March 25, 2011	March 25, 2011	1040
Holly J.'s list of symptoms are getting longer and more dangerous as she ignores her friends' pleas to seek help. Meanwhile, Alli tries to leave Toronto but realizes that it will be hard to survive on her own. Also, Wesley makes his attempt to set the Guinness World Record for most Pogo stick jumps in a 24-hour period. Note: This episode marks the final appearance of Scott Paterson as Johnny DiMarco.
229	41	"Chasing Pavements" Part One	April 1, 2011	April 1, 2011	1041
Fiona has successfully completed inpatient rehab, and she's feeling strong and in control but soon struggles with her sobriety when her court trial against Bobby arrives. Meanwhile, Alli is back at Degrassi, and to keep her mind off Drew, she prepares for a standardized math exam. Also, Anya gets stuck with Owen for a partner in CPR class and grows uncomfortable with the way he touches her.
230	42	"Chasing Pavements" Part Two	April 8, 2011	April 8, 2011	1042
Fiona questions her feelings for Adam while also beginning to see Holly J. in a different light. Meanwhile, Alli promises the tenth-grade class a school dance if they do well in the math exam and helps everyone study. Also, Anya begins to feel bad for getting Owen kicked out of CPR class.
231	43	"Drop the World" Part One	April 15, 2011	April 15, 2011	1043
Eli is getting increasingly intense about his and Clare's need for togetherness, which begins to creep her out. Meanwhile, Holly J. realizes that she is getting bored with her relationship with Sav and tries to figure out a gentle way to break up with him. Also, Jenna worries that K.C.'s apartment won't be ready for the baby and freaks out after he does not set up the crib when he said he would.
232	44	"Drop the World" Part Two	April 22, 2011	April 22, 2011	1044
As Spring Break comes near, Clare and Eli's relationship is on thin ice as it reaches new heights of danger. Also, Jenna goes into labor at the dance, while K.C. parties with his friends at his apartment.

== Reception ==
=== Ratings ===
In Canada, more than one million viewers tuned in to watch the first four episodes.

=== Accolades ===
Degrassi was nominated for a GLAAD Media Award in the Best Drama Series category, alongside Brothers & Sisters, Grey's Anatomy, Pretty Little Liars, and the winner True Blood. These awards, honouring works that fairly and accurately represent the LGBT community and issues, were announced March 19, 2011.

The two-part episode "My Body Is a Cage", centering on transgender character Adam's struggles with his family over his gender identity, won a 2010 Peabody Award for presenting its subject in a manner that "neither trivializes nor overdramatizes its subject". It also received a nomination for a Primetime Emmy Award in the outstanding children's program category, alongside iCarly, Victorious, Wizards of Waverly Place, and winner A Child's Garden of Poetry.

In the 26th Gemini Awards, Linda Schuyler, Stefan Brogren, David Lowe, Stephen Stohn, Stephanie Williams, and Brendon Yorke, won an award for best children's or youth fiction program or series, for producing Degrassi. Directors Phil Earnshaw and Pat Williams were nominated for "My Body Is a Cage (Part 2)" and "All Falls Down (Part 2)" respectively, for best direction in a children's or youth program or series, "All Falls Down (Part 2)" would win. "My Body Is a Cage (Part 2)" would win a Gemini for Jordan Todosey (Adam Torres) in best performance in a children's or youth program or series, however the writer, Michael Grassi, lost to an episode of Spliced, an animated series, for writing in a children's or youth program or series. At the 2011 Young Artist Awards, A.J. Saudin was nominated as a Recurring Young Actor in the Best Performance in a TV Series.

== DVD releases ==
Season 10, Part 1
Set details
- 24 director's cut episodes
- 4-disc set (Canadian release)
- 2-disc set (American release)
- 1.78:1 aspect ratio
Release date
(Canada) (United States) Region 1
May 17, 2011

Season 10, Part 2
Set details
20 director's cut episodes; 2-disc set; 1.78:1 aspect ratio
Release date
Canada	United States
September 27, 2011	September 13, 2011

The Complete Season 10
Set details
44 director's cut episodes; 4-disc set; 1.78:1 aspect ratio
Release date
Canada	United States
October 18, 2011	September 13, 2011
