= Joy Tanner =

Canadian actress

- Education: SUNY Potsdam (BA Honors); University of Toronto (MA); British American Drama Academy
- Occupation: Actress
- Years active: 1992–present
- Known for: Life with Derek; Nancy Drew; Degrassi: The Next Generation; Cold Squad
- Children: 1

Joy Tanner is an American-born Canadian actress, who is known for roles such as George Fayne in the 1995 Nancy Drew TV series, Jill Stone in Cold Squad, and Nora McDonald Venturi in four seasons of the sitcom Life with Derek and its movie finale Vacation with Derek. She also provided the voice of Candy Kong in the animated television series Donkey Kong Country.

== Early life and education ==
Tanner earned an honors B.A. from SUNY Potsdam, studied at SUNY Buffalo and has a diploma from the British American Drama Academy (London and Oxford, UK). In 2021, she earned a masters degree from the University of Toronto’s Centre For Drama, Theatre and Performance Studies. She was filming Locke & Key for Netflix at that time.

== Career ==
After moving to Canada, she began her career in film. She augmented her acting career with commercials in Canada and was the star in the Shoppers Drug Mart and Pharmacy commercials also playing Wonder Woman in a Listerine spot (1998–2000). She was nominated for a Gemini Award in 2007 for her guest role on ReGenesis in the episode "Let It Burn". She also had a recurring role on Degrassi: The Next Generation as Mrs. Coyne.

== Filmography ==
=== Film ===
Year	Title	Role	Notes
1992	Prom Night IV: Deliver Us from Evil	Laura	
1992	Liar's Edge	Ruth	
1997	The Touch	Max	Short film
2010	Four Sisters	Nancy	Short film
2011	Balian's Badge		Short film
2012	House at the End of the Street	Bonnie Reynolds	
2013	Neverlake	Olga	
2014	Sly Cad	The Woman	Short film
2014	Gramps	Martha	Short film
2016	Perfect	Mother	Short film
2018	Luba	Novotny	
2022	The Devil’s Void	Ariel	

=== Television ===
Year	Title	Role	Notes
1994	Boogies Diner	Cheryl Anne	73 episodes
1995	Forever Knight	Christie Black	Episode: "Strings"
1995	Nancy Drew (1995 TV series)	George Fayne	13 episodes
1996	Goosebumps	Sarabeth	Episode: "Monster Blood"
1997	Once a Thief	Droog / Shirley Hecht	Episode: "Wang Dang Doodle"
1997–1999	PSI Factor: Chronicles of the Paranormal	Lauren Cooke / Sydney Testarossa	Episode: "House on Garden Street" & "Nocturnal Cabal"
1997–2000	Donkey Kong Country	Candy Kong (voice)	Recurring role
1998	The Crow: Stairway to Heaven	Sonya Scavuolo	Episode: "Double Take"
1998–1999	Viper	Pearl / Angela	Episodes: "Regarding Catlett" & "Of Course, It's a Miracle"
1998–1999	Cold Squad	Jill Stone	26 episodes
1999	Shadow Lake	Stephanie Garvey	TV movie
1999	Dead Man's Gun	Louise	Episode: "The Good Chef"
1999	Earth: Final Conflict	Dr. Megan Catlet	Episode: "Pad'ar"
2000	Mythic Warriors	Cybele (voice)	Episode: "King Midas: The Golden Touch"
2001	Jackie, Ethel, Joan: The Women of Camelot	Lee Bouvier	TV movie
2001	Acceptable Risk		TV movie
2001	Mutant X	Kendra MacEvoy	Episode: "In the Presence of Mine Enemies"
2002	Relic Hunter	Gina	Episode: "Antianeirai"
2003	Good Fences	Binky	TV movie
2003	Doc	Nicole's Mother	Episode: "While You Were Snoring"
2003	Killer Instinct: From the Files of Agent Candice DeLong	Kit Geary	TV movie
2003	Tarzan	Mrs. Bancroft	Episode: "Wages of Sin"
2005	Missing	Dr. Laurel Bennett	Episode: "Fugitive"
2005	Time Warp Trio	Emily Roebling (voice)	Episode: "Hey Kid, Want to Buy a Bridge?"
2005–2009	Life with Derek	Nora MacDonald	70 episodes
2006	Angela's Eyes	Maggie Phillips	Episode: "Pilot"
2007	ReGenesis	Dr. Alex Lowen	Episode: "Sleepers"
2008	The Border	Nadia Abrams	Episode: "Prescriptive Measures"
2008	The Two Mr. Kissels	Personal Shopper	TV movie
2009–2013	Degrassi: The Next Generation	Mrs. Laura Coyne	24 episodes
2010	Heartland	Jennifer	Episode: "Eye of the Wolf"
2010	Vacation with Derek	Nora MacDonald	TV movie
2010	Degrassi Takes Manhattan	Mrs. Laura Coyne	TV movie
2011	Skins	Beth Lucerne	Episodes: "Tony" & "Stanley"
2012	The Phantoms	Louise Boucher	TV movie
2013	Covert Affairs	Diana	Episode: "River Euphrates"
2017	Murdoch Mysteries	Edith Frizzel	Episode: "A Murdog Mystery"
2017	The Kennedys: After Camelot	Maria Callas	Mini-Series
2017	Saving Hope	Mara Avery	Episode: "Change of Heart"
2017	Barbelle	Heather St.Clair	Episode: "1.6"
2017	Christmas Encore	Sandy	TV movie
2017	Christmas Next Door	Dana	TV movie
2018	In Contempt	Audrey Dodson	Episodes: "Necessary Force" & "BLM, Part One"
2018	Private Eyes	Candice	Episode: "Tex Therapy"
2020–2021	Locke & Key	Erin Voss	Season 1: "The Keepers of the Keys"; Recurring role: Season 2
2023	Life with Luca	Nora McDonald	TV film
2023–2025	SurrealEstate	Rochelle Decker	Recurring role
