= Daniel Magder =

Canadian actor

Daniel Ryan Magder
- Born: December 12, 1991 (age 34); Toronto, Ontario, Canada
- Occupation: Actor
- Years active: 1998–2012

Daniel Ryan Magder (born December 12, 1991) is a Canadian retired actor. He has appeared in such projects such as The Famous Jett Jackson and X-Men. His most prolific role is Edwin Venturi on Life with Derek.

Magder graduated Thornlea Secondary School in Thornhill, Ontario. After attending the University of British Columbia for his first year, he transferred to the Vancouver Film School's writing for film and television course, which he completed in December 2011. He is a brother of the Alpha Epsilon Pi fraternity, Beta Chi chapter. Currently, he is living in Vancouver British Columbia and hosts the well known Bingpot Trivia.

== Filmography ==
=== Television ===
TV shows and appearances
| Year | Title | Role | Notes |
|---|---|---|---|
| 1998 | Earth: Final Conflict | Liam | 1 episode |
| 1999 | Noddy | Sam | 2 episodes |
| 1999–2000 | Real Kids, Real Adventures | Brian / Davey | |
| 2000 | The Famous Jett Jackson | Boy 1 | 1 episode |
| 2005 | Arts and Crafts: Crayon Edition | Spencer Hoffman | 1 episode |
| 2005–2009 | Life with Derek | Edwin Venturi | 70 episodes |
| 2009 | The Latest Buzz | Elliot | 1 episode |
| 2012 | Mudpit | Micheal/Booch | 26 episodes |

=== Film ===
Films
| Year | Title | Role | Notes |
|---|---|---|---|
| 1998 | Aldrich Ames: Traitor Within | Paul Ames | |
| 1999 | Vanished Without a Trace | Daniel Porterson | TV film |
| 1999 | One Special Night | Michael | |
| 2000 | Race Against Time | Bobby Gabriel | |
| 2000 | Camera | Director | |
| 2000 | X-Men | Boy On Raft | |
| 2001 | Angel Eyes | Larry Pogue, Jr. | |
| 2001 | Reunion | Brian Cosgrave | |
| 2001 | Zebra Lounge | Daniel Barnet | |
| 2001 | Jennifer | Jake (Age 6) | |
| 2002 | Guilty Hearts | Cooper Moran | |
| 2002 | Guilt by Association | Young Max | |
| 2002 | Mom's on Strike | A.J. Harris | |
| 2004 | A Deadly Encounter | Eric Sanders | |
| 2005 | Mee-Shee: The Water Giant | Mac Cambell | |
| 2008 | Sticks and Stones | Michael | |
| 2009 | The Good Witch's Garden | Bad friend 1 | |
| 2010 | Vacation with Derek | Edwin Venturi | Television film |
| 2011 | UBC LipDub 2011 | Assistant to Marianas Trench, Clumsy Singer | |
| 2011 | Knockout | Matthew Miller | |
