= Knockout (2011 film) =

- Theatrical release poster
- Directed by: Anne Wheeler
- Written by: Joseph Nasser
- Produced by: Jack Nasser
- Starring: Steve Austin; Daniel Magder
- Cinematography: Peter Woeste
- Edited by: James Ilecic
- Music by: Daniel Seguin
- Production company: Phase 4 Films
- Distributed by: Phase 4 Films
- Release date: March 5, 2011
- Running time: 91 minutes
- Countries: Canada; United States
- Language: English
- Budget: $1 million

Knockout (also called Born to Fight) is a 2011 Canadian-American sports drama film directed by Anne Wheeler. The film stars Steve Austin, and Daniel Magder.

== Plot ==
Dan Barnes (Steve Austin) is a former pro boxer who retired after growing weary of his violent existence. While Matthew learns how to box and stand up to his tormentors, one of whom is the school boxing champ Hector Torres (Jaren Brandt Bartlett), Dan's new found role as a teacher helps him come to terms with his tumultuous past. Throughout the film Matthew (Daniel Magder), is constantly being bullied by Hector, on various occasions Hector and his friends target Matthew and constantly do anything to get under his skin. Matthew has a passion for boxing, due to the fact that his grandfather was one of the top boxers at an early age. After a small fight with Hector, Matthew is sent to Principal Lee's office for a week in detention. Matthew has troubles with his mom and step father accepting him joining the boxing club at school. Matthew has to argue back and forth with his family in order for his parents to allow him to join the boxing club. Once he gets accepted into the school boxing club, the first day he has to spar with his tormentor bully Hector. As they spar in the boxing ring, Hector becomes aggressive towards Matthew. Once the referee blew the whistle and said stop fighting, Matthew takes a cheap shot at Hector which leads to him being kicked out of the boxing club on the first day. Dan the janitor sees the whole thing, and talks to Matthew, noticing Matthew is really upset about the entire situation. Dan then takes the responsibility of helping Matthew achieve his boxing dreams. Matthew trains, and does whatever it takes to become the best he can be. With the help of his coach Dan, Matthew is able to train and become a better boxer. Throughout his training with Dan, Dan trains him both mentally and physically, and gives Matthew an opportunity to box his all time bully Hector and gives him another opportunity to join back into the boxing club.

== Cast ==
- Steve Austin – Dan Barnes
- Daniel Magder – Matthew Miller
- Jaren Brandt Bartlett – Hector Torres
- Emma Grabinsky – Ruby
- Tess Atkins – Teresa Terrel
- Samuel Patrick Chu – Nick Wirthlin
- Julian Domingues – Joe Fielder
- Scott Hylands – Grandfather Charlie Putman
- Janet Kidder – Christine Miller
- Sean Devine – Jacob Miller
- Roman Podhura – Coach Harward
- Catherine Lough Hagquist – Principal Lee
- Adrian Formosa – Paul Avery
- Jay Jauncey – Ray
- Benjamin Ratner – Mr. Doyle
- Bronwen Smith – Mrs. Nasher

== Production ==
Knockout was set and filmed onsite in Aldergrove, and White Rock, British Columbia, Canada, and Tacoma, Washington in April and May 2010.

== See also ==
- List of boxing films
