= Kardia (film) =

- Directed by: Su Rynard
- Written by: Su Rynard
- Produced by: Paul Barkin
- Starring: Mimi Kuzyk; Peter Stebbings
- Cinematography: Kim Derko
- Edited by: Michele Francis
- Music by: Philip Strong
- Production company: Alcina Pictures
- Release date: October 2005
- Running time: 85 minutes
- Country: Canada
- Language: English

Kardia is the debut feature film by director Su Rynard, released in 2005. The film was produced by Paul Barkin and Larissa Giroux of Alcina Pictures in Toronto, Ontario, Canada.

The film tells the story of Hope, a pathologist who discovers that the experimental heart operation she underwent as a child has mysteriously linked her life with another. She revisits her childhood to uncover the secrets of her past.

== Plot ==
In a flashforward, pathologist Hope leaves the research institution she works at and collapses after going down a flight of steps.

Back in 1950s Canada, a man in his early thirties – a former RCAF pilot and veteran – is about to retreat from a stroll when he notices a baby crying in the snow. He takes the baby home and cares for her with the help of an older woman.

Days later, during an outing with the man, the baby falls ill and loses colour. He rushes her home before deciding to consult a doctor.

At the hospital, the man is briefed on the baby's diagnosis and the experimental procedure that can potentially fix her heart defect. Initially reluctant, the man changes his mind and decides to become the donor. When he goes back for the surgery, a journalist takes a picture of him with the baby, which is later mailed to the hospital.

The operation leaves a permanent scar on the baby's chest but proves successful, as she grows into a healthy girl named Hope.

In the present, Hope is lecturing her two assistants (Sanjay and Sally) on the heart and doing research with them. But between work and talk, Hope is growing uncertain of her memories: she sets out on finding her adoptive father's true identity, taking out time to investigate her past and recording her thoughts on tape, something which Sally notices.

Hope later tasks Sally with getting old patient records from the hospital in order to discover her father's identity, without disclosing that it's a personal matter; but when Sally responds by saying that she would need patient approval to have the records released, Hope says it's not an issue, because she was the patient.

Sally comes into Hope's office to hand her the files, telling her that what she's overheard her say on the heart was true, and wishing Hope luck on her upcoming talk. Reading the records and consulting newspaper clippings from the time, Hope finally discovers that her father is nothing more than an unfortunate volunteer who died on the operating table, and that the many moments she has shared with him never took place. The nurse is shown leaving the picture taken before the surgery in Hope's crib.

As she leaves the office, Hope sees Sanjay and Sally bonding in the hallway, and is delighted; her heart nonetheless gives out after she leaves the building.

In a voice-over, Hope reflects on the nature of her story as her presence weighs what is now an extraordinarily light heart on a scale, mirroring a similar scene at the beginning of the film. Ultimately admitting her life was a tangle of fiction and reality, she accepts her personal truth not as what is rooted in fact, but as the result of what has objectively made her the person she became – a pathologist researching the ailment that impacted her life, focused on helping the next of kin.

== Cast ==
- Mimi Kuzyk as Hope
- Peter Stebbings as Dad
- Kristin Booth as Sally
- Ariel Waller as Young Hope
- Stephen Lobo as Sanjay
- Donna Goodhand as Auntie Florrie
- Emma Campbell as Nurse
- Steve Cumyn as Surgeon
- Nancy McAlear as Scrub Nurse
- Dylan Trowbridge as Reporter
- Nancy E.L. Ward as OR Surgery Team Member

== Awards ==
- The film won the 2005 Alfred P. Sloan Foundation Feature Film Prize at the Hamptons International Film Festival.
