= Ashley Leggat =

Canadian actress (born 1986)

- Born: September 26, 1986 (age 40); Hamilton, Ontario, Canada
- Occupation: Actress
- Years active: 1999–present
- Spouse: Jeremy Williams (m. 2011)
- Children: 3
- Website: ashleyleggat.net

Ashley Leggat (born September 26, 1986) is a Canadian actress. She is known for her roles as Casey McDonald in the Canadian family comedy series Life with Derek and as Tiffany in the MTV television film Made... The Movie.

== Early life ==
Leggat was born in Hamilton, Ontario, and has Scottish and Irish ancestry on her mother's side. Leggat began her theatrical training with Theatre Aquarius's Performing Arts Program under the direction of Lou Zamprogna. That same year, Leggat made her professional theatre debut playing Marta in Theatre Aquarius's production of The Sound of Music. Leggat went on to perform in several of the company's productions, including The Lion, the Witch and the Wardrobe, Cinderella, Anne of Green Gables, Jacob Two-Two Meets the Hooded Fang, Jekyll & Hyde and The Wizard of Oz. She also performed the role of Clara in The Nutcracker at the Hamilton Place Theatre.

== Career ==
Beginning in 2004, she appeared in the Disney feature film Confessions of a Teenage Drama Queen as Marcia, also starring Lindsay Lohan and Megan Fox, the television movie A Very Married Christmas, with Joe Mantegna and Jean Smart and played series lead Kat Adams in Ace Lightning.

Leggat performed concurrent recurring roles on the series I Was a Sixth Grade Alien for Fox and YTV, and In a Heartbeat for the Disney Channel. She performed a guest lead role on the series Real Kids, Real Adventures, and a lead role on the CBC Radio drama Articles of Faith. As well, she appeared in the cable television film What Girls Learn, starring Elizabeth Perkins and Scott Bakula; the Disney television movie The Music Man, starring Matthew Broderick; the comedy series The Blobheads; and the fantasy science-fiction series The Zack Files. In 2005, Leggat performed in Moze Mossanen's short film Roxana as part of CBC's "Opening Night" series.

In 2005, Leggat was cast in the co-lead role of Casey McDonald in the Family Channel family comedy series Life with Derek. The series ran for four seasons before ending its run in 2009. On July 31, 2009, Leggat commented on her official Facebook page that they would begin shooting Vacation with Derek in September of that year; it aired in Canada on the Family Channel in June 2010, and in the U.S. on Starz in 2011.

Leggat starred as Baby in the Toronto version of the play Dirty Dancing in 2008. In 2010, Leggat was cast in MTV's Made... The Movie as the main antagonist, Tiffany. In 2011, Leggat starred as Ashley Dunnfield in the Lifetime television movie The Perfect Roommate. In 2015, she starred in the independent film People Hold On, directed by Life with Derek co-star Michael Seater.

== Personal life ==
Leggat has four older brothers. She is close friends with her Life with Derek co-star Michael Seater.

In 2011, she married longtime boyfriend, hockey player Jeremy Williams. They have three daughters, born 2017, 2019 and 2022.

Leggat is a supporter of Count Me In, a movement that promotes student volunteerism, and helps connect young people with community service opportunities that match their interests, passions and lifestyle. She hosted the 2012 "Count Me In Conference", which has been recognized as the largest youth-run empowerment event in North America, and again in 2014.

== Filmography ==
Film roles
Year	Title	Role	Notes
2004	Confessions of a Teenage Drama Queen	Marcia	
2009	The Jerk Theory	Britney	Uncredited
2011	Cinnamon	Chloe Walters	also called My Dog's Christmas Miracle
2015	People Hold On	Julia	

Television roles
Year	Title	Role	Notes
1999	Real Kids, Real Adventures	Michelle	Episode: "Heimlich Hero: The Michelle Shreffler Story"
2000	I Was a Sixth Grade Alien	Stacey	4 episodes
2000–2001	In a Heartbeat	Michelle	3 episodes
2001	What Girls Learn	Libbie	Television film
2002	The Zack Files	Kristen	Episode: "Once and Future Zack"
2003	The Music Man	Actor/dancer	Television film; uncredited
2004	The Blobheads	Misty	2 episodes
2004	A Very Married Christmas	Danielle	Television film
2004	Ace Lightning	Kat Adams	Main role (season 2)
2005–2009	Life with Derek	Casey McDonald	Co-lead role
2005–2006	Darcy's Wild Life	Brittany McMillan	Recurring role, 5 episodes
2006	11 Cameras	Kelly	Main role
2008	The Latest Buzz	Herself	Episode: "The Star Power Issue"
2010	Vacation with Derek	Casey McDonald	Television film
2010	Aaron Stone	Nikki York	Episode: "My Own Private Superhero"
2010	Murdoch Mysteries	Ivy/Queen of Swords	Episode: "Blood and Circuses"
2010	Unnatural History	Whitney Coleman	Episode: "Sleeper in a Box"
2010	Made... The Movie	Tiffany	Television film
2011	The Perfect Roommate	Ashley Dunnfield	Television film
2011–2012	Totally Amp'd	Zoe Jones	Web series; main role
2012	Criminal Minds	Sloan	Episode: "Profiling 101"
2012	The Good Witch's Charm	Tara	Television film
2013	The Perfect Boss	Renee Renfro	Television film
2013	The Good Witch's Destiny	Tara	Television film
2014	The Good Witch's Wonder	Tara	Television film
2015	Good Witch	Tara	3 episodes
2015	The Perfect Girlfriend	Jensyn Bannet	Television film
2015	We Are Disorderly	Poppy	Web series (YouTube); episode: "Our Girlfriend"
2015	The Next Step	Herself	Recurring role (season 3), 6 episodes
2015	Charming Christmas	Jessie	Television film
2016	Suits	Naomi	Episode: "Back on the Map"
2023	Life with Luca	Casey McDonald	Television film
2024	Hudson and Rex	Carmen Silva	Episode: "Death on the Doorstep"
2024	Our Mother's Secret Affair	Diana Parker	Television film
