= Count Me In (movement) =

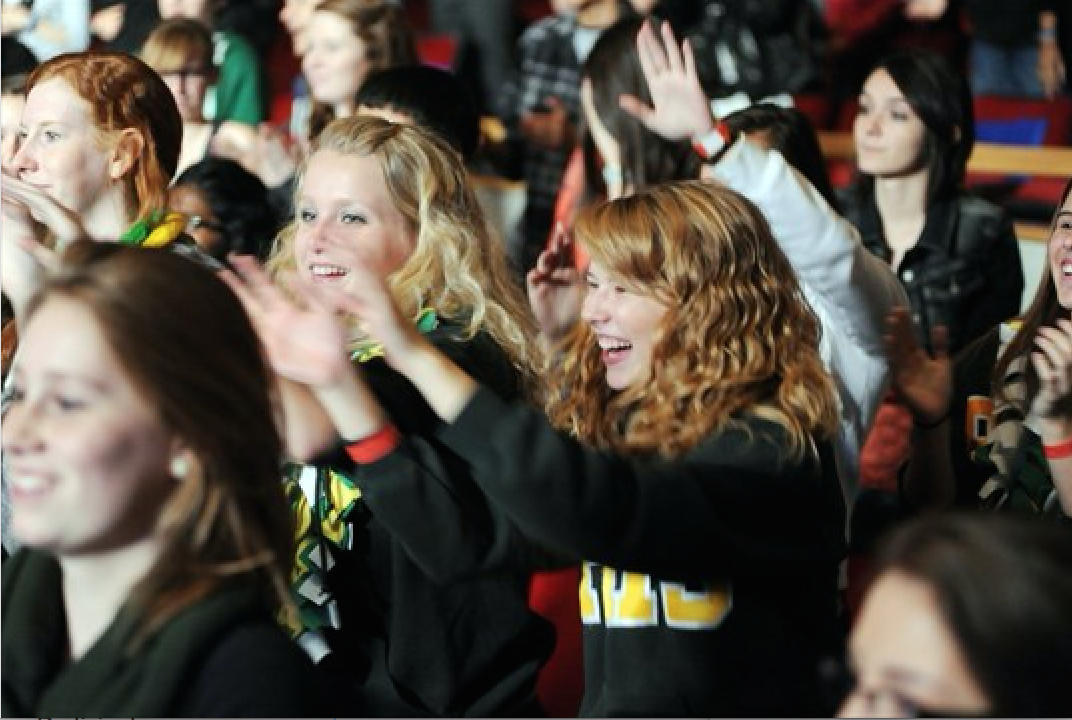
- Volunteers Cheering at the Count Me In Global Broadcast
- Formation: 2008
- Type: International youth organization and global movement
- Headquarters: Toronto, Ontario
- Location: Global
- Founder: Shane Feldman
- Website: www.cmimovement.com

Count Me In is a youth-led leadership organization. The global youth empowerment movement was founded in 2008 by Shane Feldman, and as of September 2017 the organization has impacted 10 million millennials in 104 countries. The organization was started in Toronto, Canada, and now has offices in Los Angeles and New York City. Count Me In promotes student volunteerism and community leadership, and has been recognized as the link between teenagers and the charitable sector. The organization's members have contributed over 100 million hours of community service worldwide, which was valued at $2.4 billion by the U.S. Bureau of Labor Statistics in 2016.

== Background ==
Count Me In was started by Shane Feldman at the age of 13 in 2008. The organization was developed after Feldman experienced a difficult transition into high school. With the help of his guidance counsellor, Feldman got involved in clubs and volunteer opportunities, which inspired him to help his peers do the same. He decided to plan a school assembly to help students at his York Region public high school, Westmount Collegiate Institute. 400 students from 7 schools participated in the first event, which evolved into Count Me In. What started as a small project went viral, and evolved into the global Count Me In movement.

== Count Me In Conference ==
Count Me In is best known for their youth-empowerment program, Count Me In Conference, rebranded in 2014 as the Count Me In Global Broadcast. The program inspires local volunteer action. The 2014 Count Me In Global Broadcast was the largest youth-run event in history, with 2.2 million viewers tuning in from 69 countries. The event, organized by a team of teenagers, was recognized by the Canadian House of Commons as the largest youth-run empowerment event in the world.

== Count Me In Leadership Summit ==
The Count Me In Leadership Summit is a 4-day leadership camp program for high school and college students. Youth delegates are nominated and selected from around the world, and according to Count Me In, "participants represent a diverse mix of leadership styles and backgrounds". The Count Me In Leadership Summit provides delegates with the opportunity to learn from expert facilitators and keynote speakers, and explore their individuality through interactive panels, breakout sessions, and team-building activities. With a focus on holistic leadership development and Servant leadership, delegates gain new perspectives on the world around them.

== Celebrity supporters ==
Count Me In has gained the support of notable celebrities including two-time nominated Gemini actress, Ashley Leggat, Emmy award-winning actress, Kristin Chenoweth, Olympic athlete and world champion, Perdita Felicien, JUNO nominated singer, Victoria Duffield, Star of the Emmy Award nominated series Degrassi, Luke Bilyk and Melinda Shankar, rap sensation Lil Jaxe, and Canada's Got Talent finalist, Shale Wagman, Founder of Raise Your Rag, Ryan Porter. Author of "The Ultimate Guide to Teen Life", Yahya Bakka, Pop sensation, Megan Nicole, upcoming global pop star, Francesco Yates, YouTube sensation, Hunter March.

On January 9, 2013, Feldman appeared alongside Liza Fromer on Global TV's "The Morning Show" to announce new Count Me In supporters, Degrassi star Luke Bilyk and rap sensation Lil Jaxe. Other celebrities who have supported Count Me In include:

- Ashley Leggat
- Luke Bilyk
- Cody Simpson
- Alli Simpson
- Cimorelli
- Kevin Breel
- Thomas Sanders
- Hunter March
- Jessica Tyler
- Carlos Guevara (X Factor USA)
- Josh Shipp
- Perdita Felicien
- Kristen Chenoweth
- Rick Mercer
- Matt Webb (Marianas Trench)
- The Treble
