= My Body Is a Cage =

- Degrassi episodes
- Adam binds his breasts as a temporary body modification to present his gender as male.
- Episode nos.: Season 10; Episodes 15 & 16
- Directed by: Phil Earnshaw
- Written by: Michael Grassi
- Cinematography by: Alwyn Kumst
- Editing by: Jason B. Irvine
- Production codes: 1015 & 1016
- Original air dates: August 11, 2010 (pt. 1); August 12, 2010 (pt. 2)
- Running time: 44 minutes

Guest appearances
- Jean-Marc Généreux as Mr. Menard; Ramona Milano as Audra Torres

Episode chronology
← Previous "You Don't Know My Name (Part Two)"	Next → "Tears Dry on Their Own (Part One)"
- Degrassi (season 10)

"My Body Is a Cage" is a two-part episode from the tenth season of the Canadian teen drama television series Degrassi, formerly known as Degrassi: The Next Generation. It originally aired in Canada on MuchMusic and the United States on TeenNick on August 11, 2010, with part two airing the following night. The episode follows transgender character Adam Torres (Jordan Todosey) as he struggles with himself and his family over his gender identity. Other plots include Anya MacPherson and her family learning that Mrs. MacPherson has cancer and Dave Turner's attempts at improving his grades by being a class clown.

== Plot ==
In Ballroom Dance class Adam (Jordan Todosey) finds himself developing a crush on dance partner Bianca (Alicia Josipovic). After class he collides with Clare (Aislinn Paul) in the hall, dropping a pack of tampons which, when Fitz and Owen notice them, he forces on Clare as if they were hers. The next day Adam comes out as transgender to Clare and Eli (Munro Chambers). Later Adam and Bianca flirt until Bianca discovers that Adam is transgender and begins spreading the story. Her friends Fitz and Owen assault him in the boys' bathroom. Adam's brother Drew (Luke Bilyk) tries to fight them after school but is beaten. Fitz and Owen get suspended and Principal Simpson (Stefan Brogren) assigns teachers to escort Adam to and from classes.

When Drew and Adam's grandmother, who only knows Adam as "Gracie", comes for a visit Adam decides to go back to being "Gracie" for the sake of family harmony. The stress leads him to burn himself, something that had been a previous pattern. Clare convinces him that he needs to be true to himself. Adam begs his mother for her understanding and support and later he and his family and friends burn Gracie's clothes in a bonfire, symbolically laying her to rest.

Anya (Samantha Munro) brings some soup home for lunch for her mother, who had complained of a cold. When Anya and her friend, Leia (Judy Jiao), discovers her mother has left home without her wedding ring, they suspect her of having an affair. Anya confronts her mother, who explains that she took off her ring for an MRI. The scan reveals non-Hodgkin lymphoma. Anya's fear of her mother's death initially leads her to skip a family medical consultation but a talk with former best friend Holly J. (Charlotte Arnold) inspires Anya to go.

Dave (Jahmil French) believes the only way to improve his Media Immersion grade is to make the teacher, Ms. Oh (Cory Lee) laugh. He checks her "FaceRange" page and uses her posted pictures for a class project. Failing the assignment leads him to increase his effort to be the class clown until he discovers that Ms. Oh has recently ended a relationship. He offers her empathy and she explains that hard work and not gimmicks will earn him good grades.

== Guest cast ==
- Katherine Ashby as Pam MacPherson, Anya's mother
- Maggie Butterfield as Drew and Adam's grandmother
- James Edward Campbell as Mark "Fitz" Fitzgerald
- Steve Cumyn as Harold MacPherson, Anya's father
- Jean-Marc Généreux as Mr. Menard, the dance teacher
- Riley Gilchrist as Dr. Christopoulos, Pam's doctor
- Edward Jaunz as Drew and Adam's father
- Daniel Kelly as Owen Milligan
- Ramona Milano as Audra Torres, Drew and Adam's mother

== Awards and nominations ==
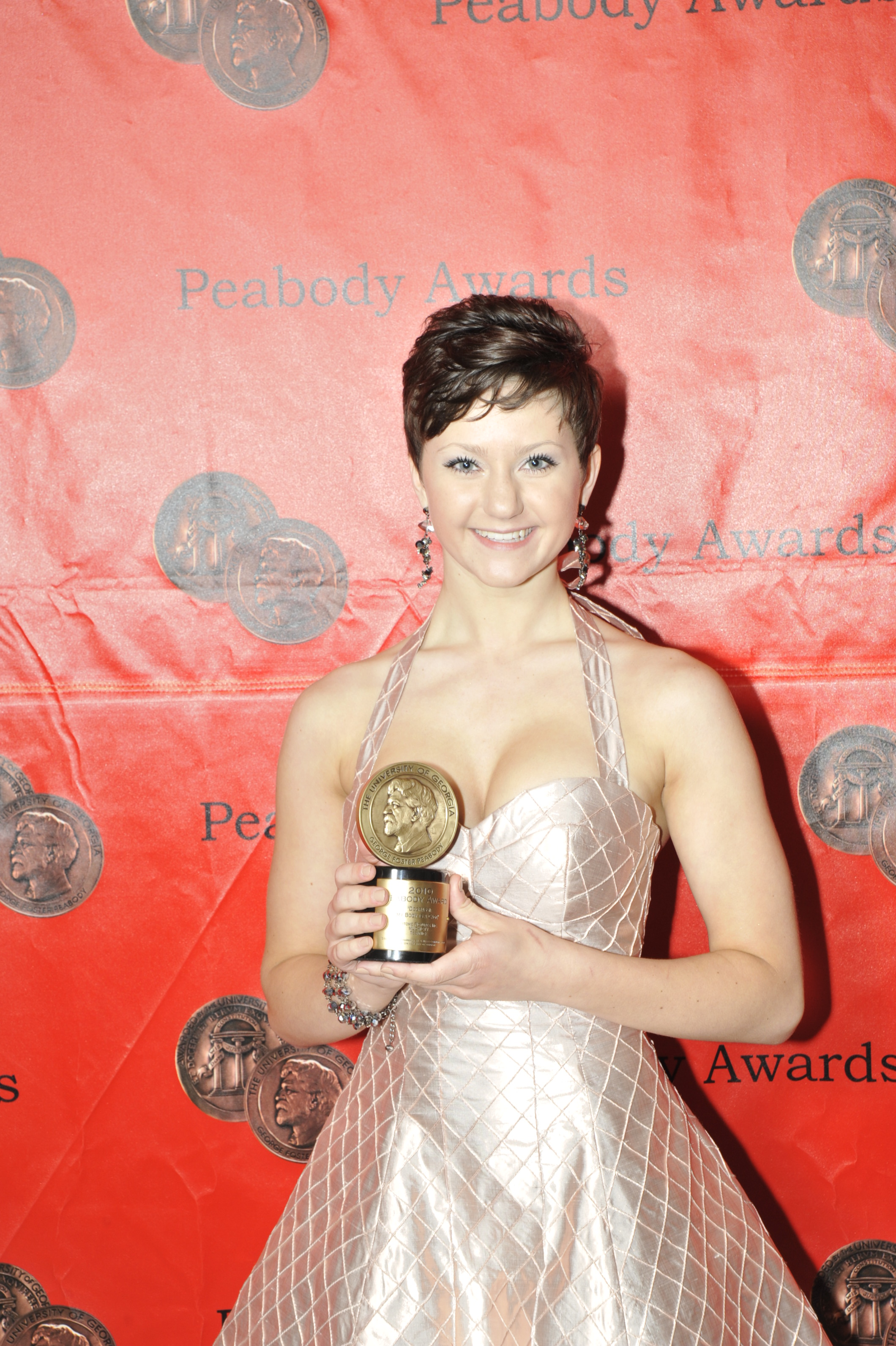
Jordan Todosey at the 70th Annual Peabody Awards

"My Body Is a Cage" won a 2010 Peabody Award. In announcing the honor on March 31, 2011, the selection committee wrote: "True to its history, the durable high-school serial's two-parter about a transgender teen neither trivializes nor over dramatizes its subject."

Part two was nominated for a 2011 Creative Arts Emmy Award for Outstanding Children's Program, but lost to A Child's Garden of Poetry. It was nominated for three Gemini Awards. It won best performance in a children's or youth program or series (Jordan Todosey) but lost in best direction in a children's or youth program or series (Phil Earnshaw) to the Degrassi summer finale and best writing in a children's or youth program or series (Michael Grassi) to an episode of the animated series Spliced.
