= Cinnamon (2011 film) =

- Cinnamon video release poster
- Directed by: Michael Feifer
- Produced by: Imagination Worldwide
- Starring: Cynthia Gibb; Greg Evigan; Ashley Leggat; Ciara Bravo; Brenda Song; Lesley-Anne Down; Robert Carradine; Kendall Sanders
- Release date: December 1, 2011
- Running time: 91 minutes
- Country: United States
- Language: English

Cinnamon, also known as My Dog's Christmas Miracle, is a 2011 American family movie, released only on video, about a spoiled Maltese puppy and her role in a romantic story involving two single parents and their families.

== Plot ==
When the single parent owner of Cinnamon, a Maltese puppy, falls for a single parent architect, the dog tries to break up the relationship, succeeds, realizes the unhappiness that results, and then tries to reunite the couple.

== Cast ==
- Cynthia Gibb as Professor Madeline Walters
- Greg Evigan as Kevin Fallon
- Ashley Leggat as Chloe Walters
- Ciara Bravo as Heather
- Brenda Song as Cinnamon (voice)
- Lesley-Anne Down as Dora
- Robert Carradine as Professor Jerry Meinhardt
- Kendall Ryan Sanders as Jordan Fallon
- Charlie Stewart as Sam
- Joey Diaz as TSA Agent

== Home media ==
This film was released on Blu-ray and DVD in the US on May 8, 2012, by Arc Entertainment.
