= Neverlake =

- Directed by: Riccardo Paoletti
- Written by: Carlo Longo e Manuela Cacciamani
- Screenplay by: Carlo Longo
- Produced by: Manuela Cacciamani
- Starring: Daisy Keeping; David Brandon; Joy Tanner
- Cinematography: Cesare Danese
- Edited by: Francesco Galli
- Music by: Riccardo Amorese
- Production company: One More Pictures
- Distributed by: Lighthouse Home Entertainment (Germany); RaiTrade (Italy); Uncork'd Entertainment (USA, Canada)
- Release date: 13 December 2013 (Courmayeur Film Festival)
- Running time: 86 minutes
- Country: Italy
- Language: English

Neverlake is a 2013 Italian horror film. The film had its world premiere on 13 December 2013 at the Courmayeur Film Festival.

Neverlake was the feature film directorial debut of Riccardo Paoletti and stars Daisy Keeping, David Brandon, and Joy Tanner.

== Plot ==
Jenny (Daisy Keeping) is a young English woman who travels to Italy to visit her father Dr. Brooks (David Brandon), a former doctor turned amateur archaeologist. Her father is currently participating in a dig at a lake that was previously worshipped by the Etruscans and is surrounded by mystery. Jenny is ultimately unaware that her visit will bring to light several horrible secrets about her father and her past, secrets that could put her very well-being at risk.

== Cast ==
- Daisy Keeping as Jenny Brook
- David Brandon as Dr. Brook
- Joy Tanner as Olga
- Martin Kashirokov as Peter

== Reception ==
Critical reception has been mixed. Culture Crypt gave a mixed review for Neverlake, writing "With moderate tweaking to deepen character development, and cleverer motivations to explain some puzzling behavior, “Neverlake” might have been a true stunner. As is, the film is still an effectively eerie blend of classic ghost story and modern medical horror mystery, as well as an impressive first narrative feature from director Riccardo Paoletti. But a handful of cut corners in the script have “Neverlake” coming up just shy of landing a complete knockout punch." HorrorNews.net was also mixed, stating "Not a masterpiece, but worth a look for the sake of its intriguing hint of originality, an unfortunately rare trait in contemporary horror."
