= Mudpit (TV series) =

- Genre: Musical; Comedy
- Created by: Jamie Waese
- Starring: Jesse Rath; Vas Saranga; Daniel Magder; Carleigh Beverly; Jeff Douglas; Robert Tinkler
- Country of origin: Canada
- Original language: English
- No. of seasons: 2
- No. of episodes: 26

Production
- Executive producers: Michael Hirsh; Toper Taylor; Tom Mazza; Jamie Waese; Jeff Biederman
- Producers: Jonah Stroh; Sarah Cutts-Rosen
- Editors: Colin Kish; Ron Wisman Jr.
- Running time: 22 minutes
- Production company: Cookie Jar Entertainment

Original release
- Network: Teletoon
- Release: January 5, 2012 – April 11, 2013

Mudpit is a Canadian live action-animated television series created by Jamie Waese. The series premiered on Teletoon in Canada on January 5, 2012 and ended on April 11, 2013. It aired as part of Teletoon's "Can't Miss Thursdays" block. The series was produced by Cookie Jar Entertainment.

== Plot ==
Mudpit follows the adventures of four teens who form the eponymous band, Mudpit, as they try to earn a recording contract through competing in the Japanese massively multiplayer online role-playing game Muzika.

Each episode presents a challenge set by Slime, which the band must overcome to win; through these challenges, the band members learn valuable life lessons. The series concludes each episode with an original song performed by the band members.

== Characters ==
=== Main characters ===
- Reese (Vas Saranga) is the founder and leader of Mudpit, and the band's lead guitarist. After being expelled from his brother band Tragic Ballerina, Reese and his childhood friend Geneva enter Muzika in an attempt to win fame. While in Muzika, he is known as Dodge.
- Geneva (Carleigh Beverly) is Reese's childhood friend, and the band's drummer. She is the writer of most of the band's music, and enters Muzika in order to express herself to a worldwide audience. Being Reese's close friend, she quits Tragic Ballerina as a sign of solidarity. It is hinted that she might have a small crush on Liam. While in Muzika, she is simply known as G.
- Mikey (Daniel Magder) is Geneva's younger brother, and the band's bassist. He is experienced at video games, and had been playing Muzika as a solo act before Reese and Geneva started to play. He enters Muzika in search of fame, and the prospects of being a ladies' man that comes with it. While in Muzika, he is known as Booch.
- Liam (Jesse Rath) is the band's lead singer and guitarist. Though he is a musical school prodigy, he comes from a very strict upbringing and, because of this, is socially awkward and inept at video games. However, he is caring at heart, and is supportive of his three friends. It is hinted that he may have a crush on Geneva. While in Muzika, he is known as Lamb.

=== Supporting characters ===
- Kyle (Kjartan Hewitt) is Reese's stepbrother, and was the lead singer in Tragic Ballerina before kicking Reese out of the band after he had a failed attempt at a crowd dive. With the departure of Reese and Geneva, the three remaining members reinvent themselves as the Spoilers. Reese and Kyle often have a combative relationship, with Kyle often attempting to prank or one-up his stepbrother. While in Muzika, he is known by the name Darkrider.
- Fitzy (Jeff Douglas) is the owner of the "Game & Grub", a restaurant and smoothie bar in Toronto where Reese and Geneva is introduced to the world of Muzika. The restaurant also contains a number of game rooms where players may rent out in order to play Muzika. Fitzy had been part of a 90s boy band known as Barry and the Boys, and had apparently saved his money and moved on from the music world to open the Game & Grub. As such, he often acts as a mentor to Mudpit and other bands that may play Muzika there.
- Slime (Robert Tinkler) is the host of Muzika, who acts as the judge in the various musical challenges that he imposes on Muzika players. As a computer character, he notably only refers to all of the human characters solely by their Muzika names. He is often harsh and condescending towards the various bands, and Mudpit in particular, he does grudgingly respect their accomplishments in the end.

=== Other characters ===
- The Ava-tarts are an all-female band centered on its lead singer, Sweetie (Meghan Heffern). They had attempted to recruit Geneva away from Mudpit to capitalize on their seemingly chauvinistic behaviour, only for Geneva to go back to Mudpit when they tried to take her identity away by forcing her to change her name to "S" and making her play the triangle, so as to not overshadow Sweetie.
- Crush the Zebra are a punk rock band considered to be completely inept at video games, and is often considered to be "the worst band in Muzika".
- The Prickly Pears are a country band whose band members are shaped like cacti. They eventually win the fans needed to win a road trip challenge, but are defeated in the last moment when Mudpit performs an impromptu concert in the middle of the street to win the challenge.

== Episodes ==
=== Season 1 (2012) ===
No. overall	No. in season	Title	Original release date
1	1	"The Show Must Go On"	January 5, 2012
Reese and his best friend Geneva form their own band when his stepbrother Kyle throws him out of his group. Together with Geneva's little brother Mikey and awkward, but super talented singer Liam, they form the new band Mudpit to compete in the rock video game Muzika. If they can qualify, they'll compete against bands from around the world for the Muzika prize – a recording contract and world tour.
2	2	"The Avatarts"	January 12, 2012
When Geneva has had enough of the boys being boys, she quits the band and joins an all-girl group called the Avatarts. Can Mudpit survive without G drumming? Enter Hobart, a monkey with some serious drumming skills!
3	3	"Travellin' Band"	January 19, 2012
With Mudpit ranking low in the Muzika standings, they need to build their fan base fast! And what better way to do that than competing in the Muzika Marathon, where bands play all night to get as many fans as they can? But to win over the fans, they'll need to learn what it means to work together as a band… and convince Fitzy to keep the G&G open all night.
4	4	"We Don't Need No Shreducation"	January 26, 2012
Mikey is psyched for Muzika's shredding contest. It's a chance to compete against his idol, Atticus T. Rain, the greatest shredder to ever live. But, when Mikey makes an ill-advised shredding wager with the rock legend and loses, it looks like Mudpit will become Atticus' lackeys forever unless Liam's guitar skills can save the day.
5	5	"Video Killed the Muzika Star"	February 2, 2012
Calling all directors! Slime's newest challenge has Muzika bands competing to make a rock video that best showcases the essence of their group. The winner gets their video played in Muzika City Centre, which is just the type of publicity that Mudpit needs! But when each member of Mudpit has their own directorial vision, their rock video quickly turns into a bomb. They'll need to rediscover what makes them Mudpit if they want a shot at winning this prize.
6	6	"Chain Gang of Fools"	February 9, 2012
If Mudpit wants to make it to the next level in Muzika, they'll have to bring their rock, and their roll and their BOY BAND DANCE MOVES! But when the band proves to have eight left feet, Slime zaps them to dance prison to join a new group -- the Chain Gang of Failed Muzika Dancers.
7	7	"Rhyme and Punishment"	February 16, 2012
It's Geneva's birthday, and Reese wants to get her the perfect birthday present. And nothing could be better than a pair of Muzika's golden drumsticks! But to give that gift, he'll have to beat an unbeatable gauntlet and then win a rap showdown. When the gauntlet proves impossible, it looks like Reese will have to throw in the towel… until Kyle offers him some cheat codes.
8	8	"Bug Hunt"	February 23, 2012
Slime's newest challenge, which has a swarm of oversized insectoids battling avatars, has Lamb breaking a sweat. But what really has his heart beating is a new player in the game, goth girl Veronica Grave. When Veronica turns him down, G steps in to help Lamb go from hopeless to heartthrob.
9	9	"Bad Booch Rising"	March 1, 2012
When Mikey's heavy metal misstep ends with a broken bass guitar, Fitzy hires him at the Game & Grub to pay off his debt. With Mikey behind the counter, Mudpit is short a team member in Muzika. But G, Lamb and Dodge aren't complaining -- a little less Booch isn't so bad… for them.
10	10	"Almost Mudpit"	March 8, 2012
When Mudpit beats the Spoilers for a coveted spot at the Blue Rocks Music Festival, their Muzika star is finally on the rise. They have their first ever press interview to prove it with More Muzika host Miller Williams. But G, Booch and Lamb quit the band when Miller's creative cutting makes it appear that Dodge thinks he's better than Mudpit!
11	11	"Viraling out of Control"	March 22, 2012
If Mudpit wants to headline at the Askew Tour, they'll have to win Muzika's skateboarding challenge. With the pressure on, Booch wipes out in a big way... to the delight of the fans. He catches on fast – the bigger his pratfall, the higher Mudpit's score with fans! But when the rest of Mudpit aren't happy being Muzika's class clowns, Booch has to choose between the band and pratfalling his way into the Askew Tour.
12	12	"Rasho Mudpit"	March 29, 2012
With their first big hit under their belts, Mudpit has qualified to enter a new song into the Muzika Theme Song competition. But, when a nasty case of writer's block strikes, it looks like Mudpit's shot at theme song glory is fading fast. How about a trip down memory lane? If they can repeat what they were doing when they came up with their first hit, they'll surely have another hit on their hands.
13	13	"Band Whisperer"	April 5, 2012
With Mudpit in a band rut, Fitzy brings in the mystical Band Whisperer to put them back on the path to Muzika glory. But when the Band Whisperer's whispered advice and his band exercises seem pointless, Mudpit is ready to throw in the towel. Can Fitzy convince the band to keep on whispering, or will they miss out on an opportunity to take the band to the next level?

=== Season 2 (2013) ===
No. overall	No. in season	Title	Original release date
14	1	"First Temptation of Mudpit"	January 10, 2013
Manipulative music executive Big Eddie offers Mudpit the quick and easy route to become real rock stars... but will they sell out or stay true to themselves?
15	2	"Bro the Switch"	January 17, 2013
Reese hangs out with Philippe in the real world, only to discover that he isn't exactly like his avatar.
16	3	"Hot Zombies in Love"	February 14, 2013
It's zombie fever at the G&G when Geneva falls for a handsome horror movie promoter... but is he just using her to promote his film at the café?
17	4	"Muzika's Most Wanted"	January 24, 2013
Reese's sibling rivalry with Kyle causes Mudpit to become Muzika's most wanted! Meanwhile, Fitzy decides to open an advice booth.
18	5	"I Am Booch"	January 31, 2013
Mudpit has to stop a virus before it destroys Muzika. But when Booch becomes the only avatar left, can he put his urge to become king of Muzika aside and do the right thing? Meanwhile, Fitzy discovers an old map in the café and hunts for buried treasure.
19	6	"Silence of the Liam"	February 7, 2013
Liam hires a pro gamer named Marvin to control his avatar for him.
20	7	"Play Mudpit for Me"	February 21, 2013
Everyone's had enough of Mikey's attitude, especially his most devoted fan, who decides to kidnap Booch to teach him a lesson!
21	8	"Banned on the Run"	February 28, 2013
When Slime's musical censorship goes overboard, Geneva decides to stand up to him despite the band's misgivings. Meanwhile, Liam goes to video game training school – taught by Fitzy.
22	9	"Party at the G&G"	March 7, 2013
Mudpit needs access to Muzika after hours, so Fitzy leaves the café in their hands. Unfortunately, Kyle has other plans... party!
23	10	"Siren Song"	March 21, 2013
When Reese befriends a female avatar who turns out to be in a wheelchair, his good-natured kindness is mistaken for pity. Meanwhile, Fitzy gets rich and decides to hire a replacement to run the café for him.
24	11	"Bottle of Mud"	March 28, 2013
When Liam's dad threatens to put an end to Liam's Muzika career, Mudpit attempts to show him why Muzika is the greatest thing ever.
25	12	"Agony of Default"	April 4, 2013
Can Mudpit balance the qualifying Muzika finals with helping Mikey study for his school finals?
26	13	"Mudpit Will Rock You"	April 11, 2013
Can Mudpit do the impossible and defeat the ultimate superband, Skaapp, to win Muzika?
