= Ariel Waller =

Canadian actress (born 1998)

- Born: May 16, 1998 (age 28); Toronto, Canada
- Occupation: Actress
- Years active: 2005–2010 (acting)
- Website: instagram.com/ariel_waller_writes/?hl=en tiktok.com/@ariel_waller_writes

Ariel Waller (born May 16, 1998) is a retired Canadian actress. She was one of the protagonists of the series Life with Derek, playing the role of Marti Venturi in the sitcom. She had a major role in the film Cinderella Man, and also appeared in Kardia as the young Hope.

She was nominated for the Young Artist Award in both 2007 and 2008.

== Filmography ==
=== Television ===
Year(s)	Title	Role	Notes	Ref.
2005–2009	Life with Derek	Martina "Marti" Venturi		
2006	ReGenesis	Ruby McGhee	1 episode	
2007–2010	Super Why	Little Miss Muffet (S1E11), Audience Kid (21 episodes)		

=== Film ===
Year(s)	Title	Role	Notes	Ref.
2005	Cinderella Man	Rosemarie Braddock		
2005	Kardia	Young Hope		
2009	Booky's Crush	Rosie	Television film	
