= Grant Austin Taylor =

American singer

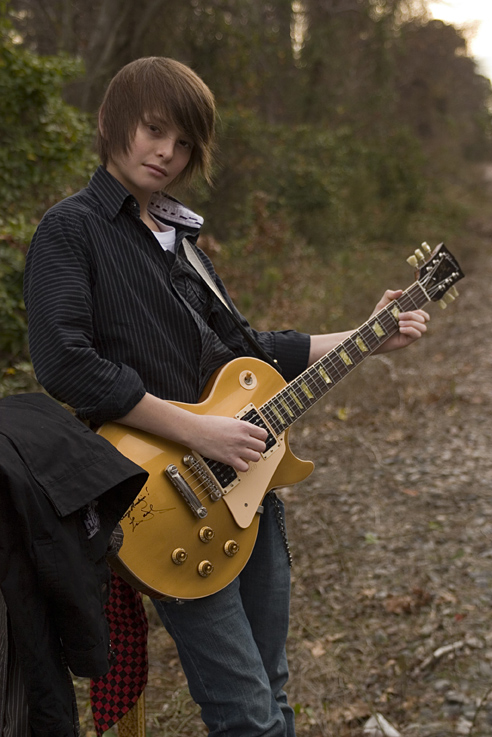

Background information
- Born: Grant Austin Taylor; May 9, 1995 (age 31); Norfolk, Virginia, US
- Origin: Norfolk, Virginia, US
- Genres: Rock, Blues, Blues-rock
- Occupations: Singer, songwriter
- Instruments: Guitar, Vocals, Harmonica
- Years active: 2003-present
- Website: http://www.grantaustintaylor.com

Grant Austin Taylor (born May 9, 1995) is an American rock and blues guitarist from Norfolk, Virginia. He started playing guitar at the age of 6 and made his performing debut at the opening of the Town Point Park in his hometown with the alternative rock band Better Than Ezra on May 30, 2003. While Grant Austin Taylor is mainly known for his solo work, he is also the vocalist, lead guitarist and harmonica player in the Grant Austin Taylor Band. In 2020, Grant Austin Taylor and his girlfriend, Taylor Anne Drumwright, together became the acoustic duo called The Taylors.

== Awards and recognition ==
- On the May 15, 2005 episode of America's Most Talented Kids, Taylor won the night's competition with his rendition of Bob Dylan's Knockin' on Heaven's Door which received a score of 9.85. He won $1000, a Gibson Les Paul guitar, a stereo system, and a karaoke machine.
- On December 3, 2005 the USO awarded Taylor the "Patriot Award" after his performance at the USO holiday party at Rockwell Hall.
- On March 10, 2007 Taylor received the special award for Outstanding Young Original Blues-Rock Artist at the 28th annual Young Artist Awards in Studio City, California. He performed his song "Make This Love Last" and James Taylor's "Steamroller" at the awards ceremony.
