= Life with Derek =

Canadian sitcom

- Created by: Daphne Ballon
- Developed by: Daphne Ballon; Bernice Vanderlaan
- Starring: Michael Seater; Ashley Leggat; Jordan Todosey; Daniel Magder; Ariel Waller; Joy Tanner; John Ralston
- Theme music composer: Gary Koftinoff and Ron Proulx
- Opening theme: "Livin' Life with Derek", sung by Cheyenne Twiner of Uncensored, performed by Gary Koftinoff
- Composer: Gary Koftinoff
- Country of origin: Canada
- Original language: English
- No. of seasons: 4
- No. of episodes: 70 (list of episodes)

Production
- Executive producers: Daphne Ballon; Christina Jennings; Scott Garvie
- Producers: Paul Pope (S1–2); Suzanne French; Laura Harbin (S1); Laurie Mclarty; Jeff Biederman
- Production locations: Corner Brook, Canada (season 1); Toronto, Canada (seasons 2–4)
- Camera setup: Film; single-camera
- Running time: 24 minutes
- Production companies: Shaftesbury Films (Note: As Life With Derek Inc. (Season 1), Life With Derek II Inc. (Season 2), Life With Derek III Inc. (Season 3), or Life With Derek IV Inc. (Season 4)); Pope Productions (season 1)

Original release
- Network: Family Channel
- Release: September 18, 2005 – March 25, 2009

Related
- Vacation with Derek (2010 TV movie); Life with Luca (2023 spin-off film)

Life with Derek is a Canadian television teen sitcom that aired on Family Channel (English) and VRAK.TV (French) in Canada and on Disney Channel in the United States. The series premiered on Family on September 18, 2005, and ran for four seasons, ending its run on March 25, 2009. Reruns aired on Family Channel until its closure in 2025, and previously aired on multiplex sister channel Family Chrgd. The series stars Michael Seater as the titular character and Ashley Leggat as his step-sister Casey. These are the two oldest children in a stepfamily.

It ended having aired 70 episodes, and was followed by one spin-off television film, entitled Vacation with Derek, which was filmed in northern Ontario in fall 2009, and it aired on Family Channel on June 25, 2010.

On May 12, 2020, Shaftesbury Films announced that a spin-off television film, titled Life with Luca and set 15 years after the original series, was in development. The spin-off feature film premiered in February 2023.

== Plot ==
George Venturi (John Ralston), a divorced man from London, Ontario who had custody of his three children from a previous marriage: sons Derek (Michael Seater) and Edwin (Daniel Magder), and daughter Marti (Ariel Waller), marries a divorced woman named Nora McDonald (Joy Tanner), who has two daughters of her own from a previous marriage: Casey (Ashley Leggat) and Lizzie (Jordan Todosey). Up until that point, Casey was perfectly content with her life. Growing up as the oldest child in a household in Toronto with only her mother and sister had suited her well and brought her up as a self-sufficient and independent young woman.

After George and Nora's marriage, the McDonalds moved in with the Venturis in London, Ontario. Casey was originally upset about having to move to London, Ontario from Toronto, a much bigger city (as shown in the episode "How I Met Your Stepbrother"), for many reasons including Derek, but she eventually got over her own problems and agreed to move there for Nora and George's sake once she saw how much they cared for each other.

== Cast and characters ==
=== Main ===
The McDonald-Venturi family (left-to-right), Derek, Marti, George, Edwin, Lizzie, Nora, and Casey

- Ashley Leggat as Casey McDonald, the oldest daughter, who also serves as the narrator. She is idealistic and independent, as well as academically ambitious. She has a Type A personality, being very particular about her academics, and frequently studies in advance. Casey is a Straight A student. She frequently clashes with Derek because of their conflicting personalities, as well as their roles as the oldest children in the household. She loves to dance and compete in jazz dance competitions. She is also a cheerleader briefly in the third season of the show. She is also a very talented singer and participates in school musicals. She eventually got into Queen's University along with Derek. In the film Vacation with Derek, it is revealed that Casey will double major in English and Economics. In the film Life with Luca, the adult Casey has become a lawyer, and is married with three children, including the teenage Luca, who is in many ways like Derek.
- Michael Seater as Derek Venturi, the oldest son and the titular "Derek" of the series. Unlike Casey, he is lax-mannered and somewhat underhanded about achieving his goals and excelling in his academics, though is not entirely unkind. Derek is a Straight D student. It is shown that he has a bond with Marti because he calls her "Smarti" and she calls him "Smerek". However, he enjoys annoying and pulling pranks on Casey. Derek is also a huge sports fan and plays on an ice hockey team. Derek has his own band called D-Rock in which he plays guitar. In the final season, he receives admission to Queen's University along with Casey. In the film Life with Luca, the adult Derek has become a rock star, and a single father to a teenage girl, Skyler, who is in many ways like Casey.
- Jordan Todosey as Elizabeth "Lizzie" McDonald, Casey's tomboyish younger sister and her "sidekick". She usually sides with Casey, though as a middle child, finds common ground with Edwin. She is very patient and gives in to things her sister says very easily. She also likes to do sports such as soccer, gymnastics and Taekwondo. She does not appear in the film Life with Luca, but is briefly mentioned by Derek.
- Daniel Magder as Edwin Venturi, Derek's younger brother. He looks up to Derek and is Derek's frequent accomplice in various schemes. He sometimes stands up to Derek but then eventually backs down feeling weak. He does not appear in the film Life with Luca, but is briefly mentioned by Derek.
- Ariel Waller as Martina "Marti" Venturi, the youngest of the Venturi children. As the youngest child, she enjoys attention from everyone in the family and can be swayed both ways in McDonald-Venturi conflicts, but can easily and rebelliously not to agree with anyone as well. She does not appear in the film Life with Luca, but is briefly mentioned by Derek.
- Simon McDonald-Venturi - Derek, Casey, Lizzie, Edwin and Marti's half-brother and the newest addition to the family. Nora is surprised to discover that she's pregnant with Simon at the end of the series. He had his debut in the film Vacation with Derek. He is only shown in the film, so he did not have a role in the TV series. Simon is the only biological child of Nora and George. In the film Life with Luca, the university-aged Simon is portrayed by John Daniel, and is shown to dislike being called "uncle" by Derek's teenage daughter and Casey's teenage son, due to not being that much older than them.
- Joy Tanner as Nora McDonald-Venturi, the mother of Casey, Lizzie and Simon and the stepmother of Derek, Edwin and Marti. She works as a window treatment specialist and was recently married to a lawyer named Dennis (whom she divorces before the start of the series). In the film Life with Luca, she has become somewhat annoyed with George's antics.
- John Ralston as George Venturi, the father of Derek, Edwin, Marti and Simon and the stepfather of Casey and Lizzie. He works as a lawyer and was recently married to a marine biologist named Abby (whom he divorces before the start of the series). Other than Simon, he is the only member of the family not to appear in every episode, he does not appear in two episodes of Season 4, though his absence is explained as him being on a business trip. In the film Life with Luca, he has grown a beard, and become more optimistic and joking.

=== Recurring ===
- Shadia Simmons as Emily Davis, Casey's best friend and next door neighbor who had a crush on Derek. She dated Sheldon Schlepper who moved to Newfoundland. She and Derek went on a date once, but decided it wouldn't work out when Derek admits he only asked her out to bother Casey. However, they began to date again after Derek realized he did like her and asks her to the prom. She often tries to help Casey fit in and helps her figure out boys along the way. According to Casey, she has a "lighthearted way of dealing with Casey's many problems". She started dating Derek in the episode "Surprise", but they broke up before the events of Vacation With Derek, since Derek took interest in Roxy.
- Arnold Pinnock as Paul Greebie, Casey's guidance counselor. She constantly goes to him for advice when she gets stressed; however he usually asks questions so that Casey can figure out her problem on her own. She will ask him questions and then immediately answer them herself. His last appearance is in the episode "Futuritis".
- Kit Weyman as Samuel "Sam" Richards, Derek's best friend and Casey's first crush since she moved in with the Venturis. After receiving Derek's permission, they begin dating in the episode "Male Code Blue". After breaking up numerous times, they call it quits in the episode "Middle Manic", but decide to stay friends in the episode "Battle of the Bands" when Casey becomes the lead singer of Derek's band. In "Surprise" he attends the prom with Kendra after she asks him. In the film Life with Luca, he reunites with Derek and Casey when they briefly reform D-Rock.
- Lauren Collins as Kendra Mason, popular girl, friend of Casey's and Derek's ex-girlfriend after the episode "Misadventures in Babysitting". She still has a major crush on Derek, and she attempts reuniting with him in "Just Friends". In "Surprise" she attends the prom with Sam.
- Robbie Amell as Max Miller, the school's quarterback and Casey's boyfriend beginning in "Misadventures in Babysitting". He dated the head cheerleader Amy before asking Casey out. They broke up in the episode "Allergy Season". Casey wanted to get back together with him in the episode "Two Kisses, One Party", but he had already moved on.
- Shane Kippel as Ralph Papadapolis, one of Derek's friends and fellow band member. It is often shown that he is not very intelligent. In season 4, Ralph briefly develops a crush on Casey. In the film Life with Luca, he is stated to have become a brain surgeon as an adult.
- William Greenblatt as Sheldon Schlepper. He dated Emily. He is currently living in Newfoundland. All of his siblings have been class president except him.
- Kate Todd as Sally, Derek's co-worker who starts to like him after breaking up with ex-boyfriend, Patrick. With some interference and planning from Casey and Nora, they finally begin to date. Sally and Derek break up after Sally decides to go to UBC, get back together soon afterward, and then break up for good when Sally actually goes to Vancouver.
- Joe Dinicol as Truman French, a new boy in school that Casey has recurring dreams about. Casey denies her feelings for him, but in the end, finally agrees to date him. Truman first appeared in "6½". They agree to go with each other in "No More Games" and they start going out in the episode "Teddy's Back". They break up in the episode "Truman's Last Chance" because Casey sees Truman being kissed by Vicki and think it's vice versa. Casey was upset, but she reunites with Truman at the prom, and they reconciled in "Surprise", but they broke up before the events of Vacation With Derek, since Casey took interest in Jesse.

=== Guest ===
- Sarah Gadon (season 1 episode: "The Wedding"), and later Paula Brancati (season 4 episode: "Truman's Last Chance"), as Victoria, aka. Vicki, Casey and Lizzie's cousin from Toronto. She and Casey appear to dislike each other, and things turn tense when Casey and Derek volunteer to organize the wedding reception of Vicki's mother, and Casey later finds out that Derek and Vicki made out when nobody else was aware. In Season 4 she and Casey appear to be on better terms, but she is revealed to be Truman's ex-girlfriend, and makes out with him while he is dating Casey. In the season 2 episode “Crushin’ the Coach” it is mentioned that she made out with the first boy Casey had a crush on.
- Alex House as Trevor (season 2 episode: "The Bet"), a "punk" boy who goes to Derek and Casey's school. Derek bets Casey she can't get him to ask her out, and Casey takes the bet, soon developing a crush on him. She loses the bet after telling him about it after Derek interferes and makes her feel guilty for lying to him. She finds out Trevor was only hanging out with her because he had a crush on Emily, but the two stay friends.
- Keir Gilchrist as Jamie (season 3 episodes: "It's Our Party" and "When Derek Met Sally"), Lizzie's best friend who harbors a crush on her.
- Hannah Lochner as Michelle (season 3 episodes: "It's Our Party" and "Power Failure" and "Derek's School of Dating"), who first appears at Lizzie and Edwin's birthday party and becomes Edwin's girlfriend after kissing him there. Although she appears infrequently, she is often referenced.
- Adam Butcher as Noel Covington (season 3 episodes: "Show-Off-Tune" and "Allergy Season"; and season 4 episode: "Just Friends"), an "artistic" boy who Casey befriends when he auditions for the lead role in a play on a dare, and, surprisingly, gets it, which leads him to co-star with Casey. He develops a crush on her. In the episode "Just Friends", Casey begins hanging out with him to prove to Derek that a guy and a girl can be friends, but it backfires when Noel thinks Casey asked him out on a date. In "Surprise" he does not appear, but is mentioned as a possible date to prom for Casey, but turns out to be going with one of Derek's backup choices.
- John Nelles as Principal Frank Lassiter (season 2 episode: "Prank Wars"; season 3 episode: "Power Failure"; and season 4 episode: "Futuritis"), the new principal starting in season 2, who frequently ends up irritated by Derek, at one point nearly expelling him. In the film Life with Luca he has become a Customs and Border Protection officer, stating that he couldn't handle being a principal anymore after dealing with Derek.
- Michael Kanevsky as Tinker Tomlin (season 2 episodes: "The Venturian Candidate" and "Prank Wars"; and season 3 episode: "Power Failure"), a timid boy at the school who follows authority and seems to have a crush on Casey.
- Cameron Ansell as Teddy (season 3 episode: "Misadventures in Babysitting"; and season 4 episode: "Teddy's Back"), one of Edwin's friends, who is a prankster, but not as good as Derek.
- Rick Roberts as Dennis McDonald (season 2 episode: "Dinner Guest"), Casey and Lizzie's biological father, Nora's ex-husband, who works as a corporate lawyer in New York.
- Jennifer Wigmore as Abby (season 3 episode: "Adios, Derek"), Derek, Edwin and Marti's biological mother, George's ex-wife, who works as a marine biologist in Spain.
- Barbara Gordon as Aunt Madge (season 3 episode: "A Very Derekus Christmas"), George's aunt.
- Tara Manuel as Aunt Fiona (season 1 episode: "The Wedding"), Nora's sister, Casey and Lizzie's aunt, Victoria's mother, who marries another man to her daughter's disapproval.

== Episodes ==
Season	Episodes	Originally released	
Season	Episodes	First released	Last released
1	13	September 18, 2005	January 22, 2006
2	13	July 1, 2006	December 15, 2006
3	26	May 11, 2007	July 5, 2008
4	18	July 19, 2008	March 25, 2009
Series finale film		June 25, 2010	
Spin-off film		February 20, 2023	

== Production ==
The first season was filmed on soundstages at Atlantic Studios Cooperative Sound Stage in Corner Brook. Seasons two through four were filmed in Toronto.

== Broadcast ==
=== Original broadcast ===
Life with Derek and another Canadian sitcom, Naturally, Sadie, were both added to Disney Channel in the United States in 2005. In June 2007, Naturally, Sadie was pulled from the channel, but Life with Derek was left on. Though many episodes were originally broadcast on Family in Canada, Disney often advertised the episodes as being new episodes. Life with Derek has not aired on the Disney Channel since January 2, 2010, but reruns continued to air on Family and Family CHRGD until September 2016 (before returning to Family Channel in 2022 until the network's closure on October 23, 2025), and VRAK.TV in Canada.

The first two seasons were added to CBC Gem on December 26, 2019. The remaining episodes were later added on February 14, 2020. In 2023, all four seasons were added to Roku TV. In 2024, all 4 seasons were made available on byutv.org and the BYUtv App.

=== Home media ===
Season	Release date	Ep #	Additional information	Bonus features
Season 1	United States/Canada: October 1, 2008	13	This two disc box set includes all 13 episodes from Season 1.	Interviews with cast and crew; Behind-the-scenes photo shoot; Studio tours with Derek and Casey; 8×20 inch full-color locker poster
Season 2	United States/Canada: August 11, 2009	13	This two disc box set includes all 13 episodes from Season 2.	Interviews with Ashley Leggat, Michael Seater, Jordan Todosey, Daniel Magder, Ariel Waller, John Ralston, and Joy Tanner; Interview with creator/writer Daphne Ballon and producer/writer Jeff Biederman; On-set tour with Michael Seater, behind-the-scenes footage
Season 3	United States/Canada: March 23, 2010	26	This three disc box set includes all 26 episodes from Season 3.	Interview with Ashley Leggat and Michael Seater

DVD title	Release date	Episodes featured	Bonus features
Life with Derek: Let the Games Begin!	United States/Canada: February 17, 2009	"The Room"; "House of Games"; "Babe Raider"; "Prank Wars"	"House of Games" interactive challenge; Play as either Casey or Derek; 8×20 inch full-color locker poster

== Awards and nominations ==
- Directors Guild of Canada

2009 - Television Series - Family (Nominated)
2007 - Television Series - Family (Nominated)
2006 - Outstanding Television Series - Family (Nominated)

- Gemini Awards

2009 - Best Children's or Youth Fiction Program or Series (Won)
2009 - Best Performance in a Children's or Youth Program or Series - Michael Seater (Won)
2009 - Best Writing in a Children's or Youth Program or Series - Jeff Biederman for episode "Just Friends" (Nominated)
2008 - Best Original Music Score for a Program or Series - Gary Koftinoff for episode "Fright Night" (Nominated)
2008 - Best Performance in a Children's or Youth Program or Series - Ashley Leggat (Nominated)
2007 - Most Popular Website (Nominated)
2007 - Best Cross-Platform Project (Nominated)
2006 - Best Original Music Score for a Dramatic Series (Nominated)
2006 - Best Performance in a Children's or Youth Program or Series (Nominated)

- Writers Guild of Canada

2006 - Youth (Won)

- Young Artist Awards

2008 - Best Performance in a TV Series: Supporting Young Actor - Daniel Magder (Nominated)
2007 - Best Performance in a TV Series (Comedy or Drama) - Leading Young Actor - Michael Seater (Nominated)
2007 - Best Performance in a TV Series (Comedy or Drama) - Leading Young Actress - Ashley Leggat (Nominated)
2007 - Best Performance in a TV Series (Comedy or Drama) - Supporting Young Actor - Daniel Magder (Nominated)
2007 - Best Performance in a TV Series (Comedy or Drama) - Young Actress Age Ten or Younger - Ariel Waller (Nominated)
2006 - Best Young Ensemble Performance in a TV Series (Comedy or Drama) - Ashley Leggat, Daniel Magder, Michael Seater, Jordan Todosey, Ariel Waller (Nominated)

== Spin-off film ==
Life with Luca is a spin-off film announced by Canadian media company WildBrain in August 2022. The film is set to follow the return of Casey and Derek, who are all grown up and have teenagers of their own. "The movie picks up fifteen years later and follows Derek and Casey as they each navigate parenthood and raise distinctly different teenagers," the movie's official logline reads, per The Sun. The synopsis teased that Casey is now a married lawyer with three kids, while Derek is a successful musician who is also a single dad of one daughter. Actors Jordan Todosey and Danny Magder, who played Casey's sister Lizzie and Derek's brother Edwin, would not be rejoining the cast. According to WildBrain Television, the actors are not reprising their younger sibling roles due to "scheduling challenges"; Todosey claimed she was not contacted.
