= Jordan Todosey =

Canadian actress (born 1998)

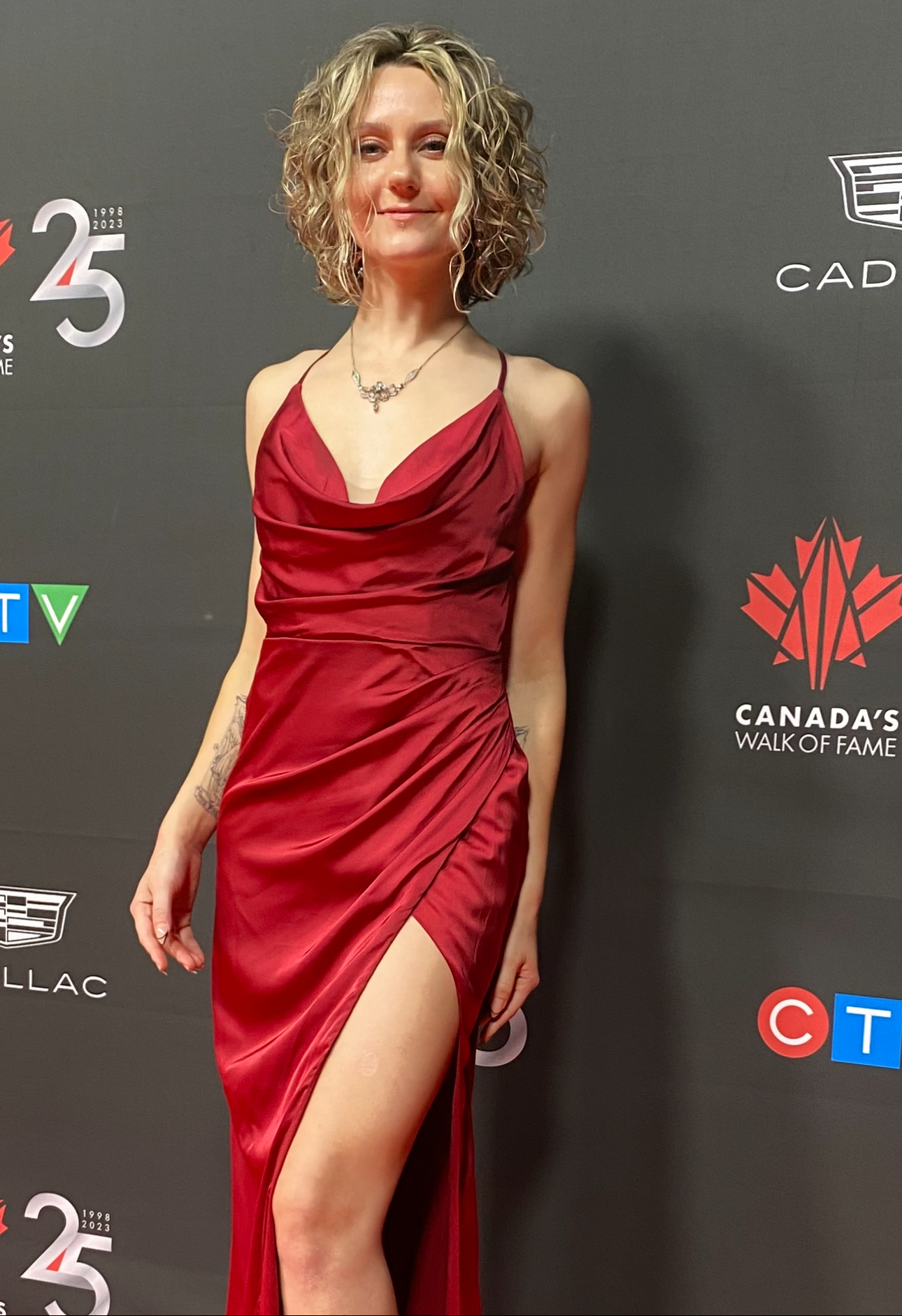
- Todosey at Canada's Walk of Fame in 2023
- Born: February 8, 1995 (age 31); Toronto, Ontario, Canada
- Other names: Jordy, odditie
- Occupations: Actress, musician
- Years active: 2005–present
- Known for: Life with Derek, Degrassi: The Next Generation
- Height: 5 ft 5 in (165 cm)
- Website: https://jordytodosey.com/

Jordan Todosey (/ˈtɒdəsi/ TOD-ə-see, born February 8, 1995) is a Canadian actress. She is known for her role as Adam Torres, the first transgender character on the long-running TV series Degrassi: The Next Generation, and as Lizzie McDonald on Life with Derek. More recently, Todosey has released music under the alias 'odditie'.

== Early life ==
Todosey was born and raised in Toronto, Ontario, Canada and began working as a child actor at a young age, making appearances in series such as Instant Star (2004–2008), Life with Derek (2005–2009) and Flashpoint (2008–2012).

== Career ==
=== Degrassi ===
Todosey is perhaps best known for playing a transgender character, Adam Torres, in the Degrassi franchise, becoming the first actor to portray a transgender character in the show's 30-year history. Her portrayal of matters involving transphobic violence, coming out, and gender transitioning received praise by audiences and LGBT+ organizations.

For her performance, Todosey won a Gemini Award in 2011, for Best Performance in a Children's or Youth Program or Series, and the two-part episode "My Body Is a Cage" has also been widely recognized, including winning a Peabody Award in 2011, citing that Todosey "beautifully portrayed" a transgender character.

Chaz Bono, who is transgender, appeared on the show in support of Todosey's role. He invited her to meet with his group for trans teens to discuss her portrayal and to help her understanding the role. Bono stated that Todosey's character was "spot on" in the experiences of transgender people in high school and had helped one of his group members discover their own trans identity.

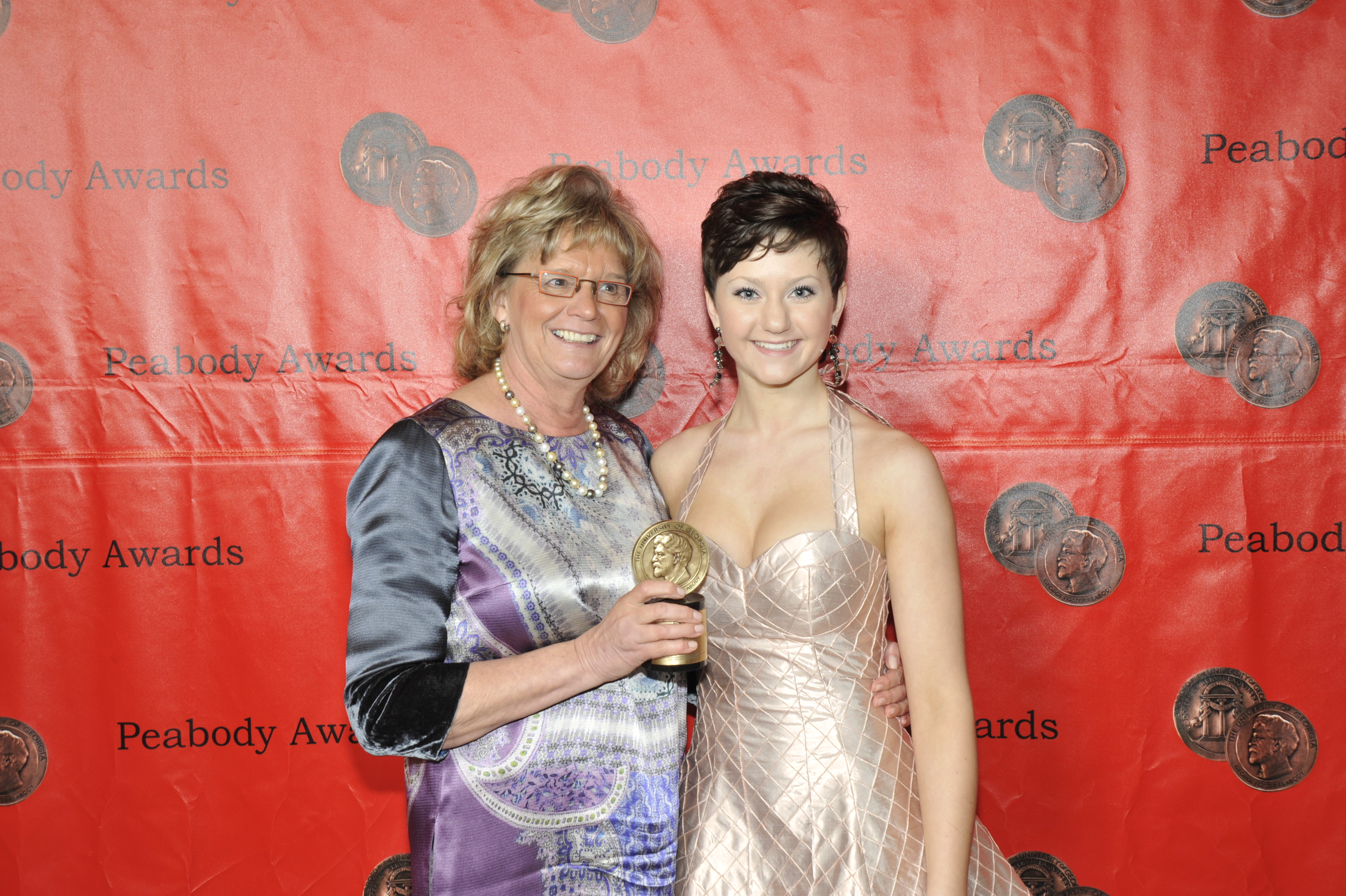
Todosey with series creator Linda Schuyler at the 70th Annual Peabody Awards

When Todosey's character was killed off from the series in 2013, controversy ensued, including a statement from GLAAD condemning the decision to kill off Todosey's character, while also calling Todosey's performance "authentic, multi-dimensional..."

Linda Schuyler, one of the show's creators, defended the choice to kill the character, saying in a statement that Todosey's storyline "will affect even more lives in an authentic way…" The executives argued that Adam's death, a result of texting while driving, was an important storyline to present to audiences.

It was also revealed that Todosey's contract had ended with the show and the actress had chosen not to renew it, leading to the death storyline.

=== Other work ===
Todosey played Lizzie McDonald in the series Life with Derek from 2005 to 2009 and the spin-off movie Vacation with Derek. She received a Best Young Ensemble Performance in a TV Series - Comedy or Drama at the Young Artist Awards for the show.

In 2006, Todosey portrayed Amelia in the short film Santa Baby. Her performance earned her a Best Female Performance win at the Yorkton Film Festival.

She also appeared in one episode of Flashpoint; in The Pacifier as a Firefly (Girl Scout); and in The Prize Winner of Defiance, Ohio as Tuff Ryan at 9 years old. She also voiced the main character, Willa, on the animated TV series Willa's Wild Life.

In 2015, she co-starred with Henry Rollins and Boo Boo Stewart in the thriller He Never Died. She appeared as Tracey in Between. In 2016, she appeared in Murdoch Mysteries.

== Filmography ==
=== Film ===
Year	Title	Role	Notes
2005	The Pacifier	Firefly #3	
2005	The Prize Winner of Defiance, Ohio	Tuff Ryan at 9 yrs	
2006	Instant Star	Helen	"Problem Child"
2006	Santa Baby	Amelia	Short film
2007	The Stone Angel	Lottie (age 9)	
2015	He Never Died	Andrea	
2015	Reign	Charlie	
2015	Portal to Hell!!!	Angie	Short film
2016	Sweetblood	Lucy	
2017	The Immaculate Conception Photography Gallery	Nina	Short film
2019	Two People in Complete Darkness		Short film
2019	You and Me	Jess	Short film; executive producer
2019	The Marijuana Conspiracy	Sally	
2021	Vienna	Robyn	

=== Television ===
Year	Title	Role	Notes
2005–2009	Life With Derek	Lizzie McDonald	70 episodes, main character
2006	Instant Star	Hannah	Episode: "Problem Child"
2008	Flashpoint	Phoebe Swanson	Episode: "First in Line"
2008–2009	Friends and Heroes	Sophia	Voice role; 13 episodes
2008–2009	Willa's Wild Life	Willa	Main role (voice)
2010–2013	Degrassi	Adam Torres	Main role; 136 episodes
2010	Vacation with Derek	Lizzie McDonald	TV film
2010	The Good Witch's Gift	Jodi	TV film
2010	Degrassi in India	Self	Documentary
2011	Rookie Blue	Esther	Episode: "Heart & Sparks"
2012	Secrets of Eden	Tina McBradden	TV film
2013	Saving Hope	Arwen	Episode: "Why Waste Tim"
2015	Remedy	Patti McLellan	Episode: "Blood & Guts"
2015–2016	Between	Tracey Creeker	12 episodes
2016	Murdoch Mysteries	Fen	Episode: "Wild Child"
2017–2018	Wishfart	Tsuni	Voice role; 40 episodes
2018	The Detail		Episode: "The Past is Never Dead"
2019	Hudson and Rex	Alicia	1 episode
2019	Go Away, Unicorn!	Jaded	Voice role; 7 episodes

== Awards and nominations ==
Year	Award	Category	Work	Result	Ref.
2006	Young Artist Awards	Best Young Ensemble Performance in a TV Series - Comedy or Drama	Life with Derek	Nominated	
2006	Yorkton Film Festival	Best Female Performance	Santa Baby	Won	
2011	Gemini Awards	Best Performance in a Children's or Youth Program or Series	Degrassi: The Next Generation	Won	
2016	South African Horrorfest	Best Ensemble Cast	Portal to Hell!!!	Won	
