= List of Life with Derek episodes =

The following is a list of episodes of the Canadian sitcom Life with Derek, which also appeared on Disney Channel. The show premiered on September 18, 2005 and ended its run on March 25, 2009, spanning 4 seasons, with 70 episodes produced.

== Series overview ==
Season	Episodes	Originally released	
Season	Episodes	First released	Last released
1	13	September 18, 2005	January 22, 2006
2	13	July 1, 2006	December 15, 2006
3	26	May 11, 2007	July 5, 2008
4	18	July 19, 2008	March 25, 2009
Series finale film		June 25, 2010	
Spin-off film		February 20, 2023	

== Episodes ==
=== Season 1 (2005–06) ===
- This season was filmed in Corner Brook, Newfoundland and Labrador. All episodes were directed by Ron Murphy.

No. overall	No. in season	Title	Directed by	Written by	Original release date	Prod. code
1	1	"The Room"	Ron Murphy	Daphne Ballon	September 18, 2005	101
After moving into their new house, Casey decides she needs a room of her own - or rather, she wants Derek’s room.
2	2	"The Fall"	Ron Murphy	Daphne Ballon	September 25, 2005	103
Casey trips at school and is given the nickname "Klutzilla" by Derek.
3	3	"The Party"	Ron Murphy	Jeff Biederman	October 2, 2005	104
Casey and Derek try to convince their parents that they can be trusted to take care of Lizzie and Edwin for the weekend.
4	4	"Puppy Dog Tails"	Ron Murphy	Ed Riche	October 16, 2005	107
Casey, Lizzie and Nora decide to add a feminine touch to the living room.
5	5	"Grade-Point: Average"	Ron Murphy	Dennis Heaton	October 23, 2005	109
Casey tries to change her reputation by teaming up with the school’s biggest slacker for an English project - Derek, who's struggling to pass for once.
6	6	"The Wedding"	Ron Murphy	Suzanne Bolch & John May	October 30, 2005	111
Casey volunteers to organize the wedding reception for her aunt, however, she must deal with the constant criticism from her nemesis, cousin Vicki.
7	7	"The Poxfather"	Ron Murphy	Brian Hartigan	November 6, 2005	112
Casey helps Derek with his “merchandising business” while he has the chicken pox, which George attempts to avoid getting himself.
8	8	"House of Games"	Ron Murphy	Alex Pugsley	November 13, 2005	102
The game is on, and Casey and Derek face off for the prized areas of the house.
9	9	"Marti The Monster"	Ron Murphy	Daphne Ballon	December 4, 2005	106
Casey tries to ruin Derek’s babysitting date with Sandra by leaving him alone with Marti the Monster.
10	10	"Sweet Misery"	Ron Murphy	Bernice Vanderlaan	December 11, 2005	108
When Derek causes Casey to sprain her ankle, she schemes to take one of his prized possessions.
11	11	"Babe Raider"	Ron Murphy	Suzanne Bolch & John May	December 18, 2005	110
Casey tries to fight sexist attitudes at home by going after the video game Babe Raider
12	12	"All Systems No Go"	Ron Murphy	Jeff Biederman	January 15, 2006	105
Casey attempts to organize the household chores, while Nora tries to repair her relationship with the neighbors.
13	13	"Male Code Blue"	Ron Murphy	Jeff Biederman	January 22, 2006	113
Derek tries to ruin the budding romance between Casey and his best friend, Sam.

=== Season 2 (2006) ===
- Starting with this season, the series was taped in Toronto, Ontario.

No. overall	No. in season	Title	Directed by	Written by	Original release date	Prod. code
14	1	"Date with Derek"	Paul Fox	Jeff Biederman	July 1, 2006	201
Casey believes that Derek is taking revenge on her by asking Emily out on a date; Lizzie worries about being a bad dancer.
15	2	"He Shoots, She Scores"	Benjamin Weinstein	Bernice Vanderlaan	July 29, 2006	203
Derek agrees to train Lizzie in the art of playing hockey; Casey coaches Edwin on how to talk to girls; George and Nora find out Marti is stealing toys from other kids.
16	3	"Middle Manic"	Paul Fox	Jeff Biederman	September 22, 2006	202
Derek is worried that Casey and Sam's break-up will stop him from playing in the Hockey Championships in Sweden.
17	4	"Venturian Candidate"	Steve Wright	Jeff Biederman	September 29, 2006	204
Casey convinces Derek to run for school president; Lizzie tries to force the family to be more environmentally aware.
18	5	"Battle of the Bands"	Paul Fox	Ed Riche	October 6, 2006	206
Derek swallows his pride and asks Casey to join his band for the annual "Battle of the Bands" competition.
19	6	"Lies My Brother Told Me"	Benjamin Weinstein	Daphne Ballon & Al Schwartz	October 13, 2006	205
Using Derek's advice, Casey lies to get an extension on a school assignment.
20	7	"Crushin' the Coach"	Ron Murphy	Jeff Biederman	October 20, 2006	210
Lizzie has a crush on Casey's new boyfriend, who Marti dislikes, however, Derek learns a devastating secret. George becomes upset when Nora says their relationship was not love at first sight.
21	8	"Prank Wars"	Ron Murphy	Daphne Ballon	October 27, 2006	207
Casey tries to pay Derek back for his practical jokes by pulling a prank of her own.
22	9	"Freaked Out Friday"	Benjamin Weinstein	Daphne Ballon	November 3, 2006	208
Casey's dance competition and Derek's hockey playoffs stress them out, much to the chagrin of Lizzie and Edwin.
23	10	"The Bet"	Ron Murphy	Alex Pugsley	November 9, 2006	211
Casey bets Derek that she can get a guy to ask her out on a date.
24	11	"Mice and Men"	Steve Wright	Daphne Ballon & Sherry White	December 1, 2006	212
Derek starts to act like a grown-up when Casey tells him that a girl finds him immature. Meanwhile, mice are found in the house, scaring the men, but Lizzie refuses to let them be exterminated.
25	12	"Dinner Guest"	Paul Fox	Daphne Ballon	December 8, 2006	209
Missing her dad, who is currently based in New York, Casey invites him to dinner and sets out to make the night perfect.
26	13	"The Dating Game"	Steve Wright	Daphne Ballon	December 15, 2006	213
Derek and Kendra try to find the perfect date for Casey.

=== Season 3 (2007–08) ===
No. overall	No. in season	Title	Directed by	Written by	Original release date	Prod. code
27	1	"Two Timing Derek"	Steve Wright	Daphne Ballon	May 11, 2007	301
Derek asks out Casey's friend even though he has a girlfriend.
28	2	"It's Our Party"	Paul Fox	Jeff Biederman	May 18, 2007	302
George and Nora plan a joint birthday party for Lizzie and Edwin.
29	3	"Misadventures in Babysitting"	Benjamin Weinstein	Al Schwartz	May 31, 2007	304
While the parents are out, Casey babysits and tries to be very responsible, however, Derek is completely against her.
30	4	"Slacker Mom"	Steve Wright	Daphne Ballon	June 23, 2007	305
Nora becomes a stay-at-home mom and tries to recruit Casey and her friends to work at the school fun fair.
31	5	"Power Failure"	Benjamin Weinstein	Karen Hill	July 7, 2007	307
Derek is selected to be a prefect at school, but an unhappy Casey tries to prove that he is not up to the job. Meanwhile, Edwin and Lizzie realize Marti always gets what she wants.
32	6	"Don't Take a Tip From Me"	Craig Pryce	Bernice Vanderlaan	July 21, 2007	310
Casey and Derek both end up getting a job at the same restaurant working as waiters. Meanwhile, Edwin and Lizzie revel in being the oldest children in the house.
33	7	"The Bully Brothers"	Craig Pryce	Jeff Biederman	July 28, 2007	306
Edwin is getting bullied by a kid at school and asks Derek to do something about it.
34	8	"Home Movies"	Steve Wright	Jeff Biederman	August 5, 2007	315
Casey attempts to start filming a family documentary for school, but comes across a few problems with the cast.
35	9	"Show-Off-Tune"	David Warry-Smith	Jeff Biederman	August 12, 2007	322
Casey secures the lead role in the school musical; Derek gets promoted from the chorus to lead vocalist.
36	10	"Summer School Blues"	Harvey Crossland	Brian Hartigan	August 26, 2007	314
Casey works at Marti's summer camp at the high school, while Derek has to go to summer school. Meanwhile, Edwin and Lizzie set up a pet-sitting service at home.
37	11	"Grade A Cheater"	Steve Wright	Graham Seater & Michael Seater	September 11, 2007	316
Derek switches test papers with Casey, and then lures her into a scheme that will keep them both out of trouble; Edwin, Lizzie, and Marti feel that they are doing too many chores for the amount of allowance they are getting.
38	12	"Adios Derek"	Paul Fox	Jeff Biederman	September 25, 2007	308
While failing Spanish at school, George and Abby (Derek's mom) think that their son should come live with her in Spain for six months.
39	13	"Fright Night"	Steve Wright	Brian Hartigan	October 15, 2007	311
When Casey lectures Derek and Edwin about watching scary movies, they take her admonishment as a dare to scare.
40	14	"Sixteen Sparkplugs"	Benjamin Weinstein	Daphne Ballon	November 5, 2007	309
Derek is frightened by the fact that he may have to spend his sixteenth birthday with his family, while they try to get him a car.
41	15	"When Derek Met Sally"	Benjamin Weinstein	Daphne Ballon	November 26, 2007	312
After his break-up with Kendra, Derek thinks he doesn't want to date ever again - until he meets the new waitress at Smelly Nelly's.
42	16	"A Very Derekus Christmas"	Steve Wright	Daphne Ballon	December 3, 2007	326
When Christmas plans go awry, Aunt Madge encourages Derek to help restore the family's holiday spirit.
43	17	"Ivanwho?"	Craig Pryce	Brian Hartigan	January 7, 2008	317
While studying for a test on the great romantic figure Ivanhoe, Casey decides that even in the modern world, there's something noble about a chivalrous guy risking life and limb to protect his loved ones.
44	18	"Rumor Mill"	Steve Wright	Sarah Glinski	February 11, 2008	303
Casey accidentally causes Emily and Sheldon to break up; Kendra invites Max to a Valentine's Day dance. Meanwhile, George tries to plan the perfect Valentine's day for Nora, and Edwin discovers the power of rumors.
45	19	"Derek Un-Done"	David Warry-Smith	Daphne Ballon	March 3, 2008	318
Derek thinks he has finally caught Sally's attention; Casey thinks it's all over between her and Max.
46	20	"Not So Sweet 16"	Steve Wright	Daphne Ballon	April 7, 2008	319
Derek turns Casey's plan for a sophisticated Sweet Sixteen party into a bash more to his liking, but problems arise when she develops appendicitis.
47	21	"Driving Lessons"	Craig Pryce	Jeff Biederman	April 21, 2008	320
Despite his past failures, Derek is so confident that he'll pass his driver's test before Casey that he makes her a hefty wager. George, meanwhile, loses his license.
48	22	"Make No Prom-ises"	Harvey Crossland	Bernice Vanderlaan	May 19, 2008	313
Casey's dream of a romantic prom night turns into a nightmare when Derek accidentally ruins her dress. Meanwhile, Sheldon tries to tell Emily something, and Sally wants to go to prom with Derek.
49	23	"Cheerleader Casey"	Steve Wright	Matt MacLennan	June 2, 2008	321
Casey tries out for the cheerleading squad, despite the fact that Max's ex-girlfriend Amy is the head cheerleader.
50	24	"Allergy Season"	Steve Wright	Jeff Biederman	June 16, 2008	323
Casey develops a mysterious allergic reaction after Max gives her his football jacket; George makes a bet with Derek about his attitude.
51	25	"Things That Go Bump in the Night"	Craig Pryce	Matt MacLennan	June 23, 2008	324
Grounded for the weekend for fighting again, Casey and Derek try to sneak out to go to a party, but they end up putting a dent in George's car.
52	26	"Derek's School of Dating"	Craig Pryce	Story by : Matt MacLennan; Teleplay by : Alex Pugsley	July 5, 2008	325
Ever since Sally turned him down a few weeks ago, Derek's been using his patented "freeze out strategy," and it seems to be working.

=== Season 4 (2008–09) ===
No. overall	No. in season	Title	Directed by	Written by	Original release date	Prod. code
53	1	"Two Kisses, One Party"	Craig Pryce	Daphne Ballon	July 20, 2008	401
Derek refuses to help out with Marti's birthday party despite being asked by Sally; Casey tries to find closure after her break-up with Max.
54	2	"Open Mic Plight"	Michael Mabbott	Jeff Biederman	July 27, 2008	402
After Derek has trouble expressing his feelings for Sally, she demands that he write a love song for her. Edwin tries out his comedy routine on the family.
55	3	"Just Friends"	Steve Wright	Jeff Biederman	August 12, 2008	403
After Sally has a friendly dinner with her ex-boyfriend, an irritated Derek decides to spend time with Kendra to make a point that girls and guys can't be just friends.
56	4	"March Break"	Michael Mabbott	Alex Pugsley	August 26, 2008	404
While the rest of the family heads off to Quebec for March break, Casey and Derek stay home alone together.
57	5	"6½"	Craig Pryce	Daphne Ballon	September 9, 2008	406
Even though she tries not to care, Casey is crushed to learn the cute new guy, Truman, rated her a mere 6 1/2 out of 10.
58	6	"Derek Denies Denial"	Steve Wright	Daphne Ballon	September 23, 2008	407
Derek breaks up with Sally after she reveals her plans to attend a university in another province; believing that he is hurt and bottling up his feelings, a concerned Edwin and Casey try to get him to open up.
59	7	"Happy New Schoolyear"	Craig Pryce	Daphne Ballon	October 7, 2008	411
Derek plans to drop out of school to be with Sally in Vancouver. All five kids stress about the upcoming school year.
60	8	"No Secrets"	Steve Wright	Daphne Ballon	October 21, 2008	408
Casey is in panic mode after the diary that details her unsettling romantic dreams about Truman goes missing.
61	9	"Take a Stepkid to Work Day"	Craig Pryce	Graham Seater & Michael Seater	November 4, 2008	405
Casey spends the day with George at his law office and takes the initiative to reorganize his filing system. Derek tries to help Nora land a business deal with a wealthy client, despite them both being stuck at home due to the other kids being sick.
62	10	"No More Games"	Craig Pryce	Daphne Ballon & Jeff Biederman	November 18, 2008	414
Casey gets stuck with Truman as her fencing partner in gym; what starts out as a friendly game of table tennis between Derek and Edwin turns into an ongoing competition to figure out who is the better player.
63	11	"How I Met Your Stepbrother"	Moze Mossanen	Jeff Biederman	December 2, 2008	410
As George prepares a Mexican fiesta for their second wedding anniversary, Nora gets a reluctant Casey to tell the story of how she and Derek first met.
64	12	"Casey & Ralph?!"	Paul Fox	Jeff Biederman	December 16, 2008	412
Ralph stays at Derek's house while his parents are away for the weekend. While there, he develops a crush on Casey.
65	13	"Tuesday Afternoon Fever"	Paul Fox	Matt MacLennan	December 30, 2008	413
After entering a TV dance contest, Casey must find a new dance partner when the previous one pairs up with her rival. Meanwhile, Lizzie and Nora try to get George and Edwin to eat healthier.
66	14	"Teddy's Back"	Steve Wright	Alex Pugsley	March 4, 2009	415
A surprise visit from Edwin's friend, Teddy, turns into a frequent occurrence that makes the entire household uncomfortable. Despite warnings from Emily, Casey goes on a date with Truman. Absent: John Ralston as George Venturi
67	15	"Rude Awakenings"	Steve Wright	Bernice Vanderlaan	March 11, 2009	409
To be eligible for college athletic scholarships, a "D average" Derek seeks help in passing his final exams. Meanwhile, Casey, stressed over finals, tries to relax.
68	16	"Truman's Last Chance"	Benjamin Weinstein	Daphne Ballon	March 18, 2009	416
Derek serves as a chaperone for Casey, who is going to a party in Toronto with Truman. Lizzie goes out on a date with a new boy. Absent: John Ralston as George Venturi
69	17	"Surprise"	Benjamin Weinstein	Daphne Ballon & Jeff Biederman	March 25, 2009	417
As the prom approaches, Casey and Derek both find themselves without a date; meanwhile, George and Nora have something to tell the family.
70	18	"Futuritis"	Steve Wright	Daphne Ballon & Jeff Biederman	March 25, 2009	418
Casey is having difficulty writing her valedictorian speech for graduation; Edwin is concerned that he won't be able to live up to Derek's reputation at JS Thompson High when he goes there in the autumn.

== Series finale (2010) ==
Title	Directed by	Written by	Original release date
Vacation with Derek	Michael McGowan	Daphne Ballon	June 25, 2010
Casey and Derek are back and continue their rivalry during a family vacation to visit their grandmother, Felicia at her beautiful lakefront lodge. Things heat up with Casey when she meets Jesse, a young dancer who happens to be a waiter at the lodge. Meanwhile, as Derek is "chilling" on his vacation, he falls for Roxy, the rich girl who lives across the lake. But when Roxy’s father, a greedy land developer, threatens to destroy the natural beauty around them, the McDonald-Venturi kids bond together to save the lake and the lodge, with a little legal help from George and Nora who are having a baby too.

== Spin-off film (2023) ==
Title	Directed by	Written by	Original release date
Life with Luca	Ron Murphy	Daphne Ballon & Jeff Biederman	February 20, 2023
Fifteen to sixteen years after the end of Vacation with Derek, Derek is a rock star with his own band, and single father to teenage Skyler, living in Paris. Meanwhile, Casey is a lawyer, married to a hockey player currently away competing, with three children, teenage Luca and younger Kai and Molly, living in Canada. The family is invited to George and Nora’s new home for their twentieth wedding anniversary housewarming party, but due to a miscommunication, only Derek and Casey's families arrive, later joined by Simon, who is on academic probation at university. The family hijinks resume as Skyler and Luca do not get along, Casey and Derek struggle to get the house decorated for their parents' arrival, Simon attempts to write an essay to get off academic probation, and impress a girl in town, and George and Nora, returning from New Jersey, are pursued by a jewel thief due to a mix up when renting a car. It comes to a head when Skyler and Luca hitch a ride to a concert with Simon and get lost, and the family has to pull together to find them, as well as ensure the party goes off without a hitch.
