= Al Mukadam =

Canadian actor

- Born: Ali Mukaddam; April 6, 1985 (age 41); Toronto, Ontario, Canada
- Occupations: Actor, director, producer
- Years active: 1998–present
- Notable work: Ray Brennan in Radio Free Roscoe

Al Mukadam (born Ali Mukaddam; April 6, 1985) is a Canadian actor, director, and producer. He began his career as a child voice actor in animated series including Angela Anaconda (1999–2001), Franklin (2000-2002) and Rolie Polie Olie (2001–2004), and is known for his performance as Ray Brennan in the Family Channel teen comedy-drama Radio Free Roscoe (2003–2005). His film credits include People Hold On (2015) and Miss Sloane (2016).

== Career ==
Mukadam started his career as a child actor, starring in several Canadian television series, including Mythic Warriors: Guardians of the Legend, Anne of Green Gables: The Animated Series, and Degrassi: The Next Generation. He transitioned into more mature roles with his performance as high school student Ray Brennan in the Family Channel television series Radio Free Roscoe (2003–2005).

In 2015, Mukadam starred in the independent film People Hold On, as part of an ensemble cast that included Chloe Rose, Katie Boland, and Paula Brancati, which was nominated for a Canadian Screen Award. That year, he also starred and co-produced the comedic web series We Are Disorderly, which premiered at a screening in Toronto that was attended by Drake and other Degrassi alum.

In 2016, he appeared in the feature film Miss Sloane, opposite Jessica Chastain. The film had its world premiere at the AFI Fest on November 11, 2016, and also screened at the Napa Valley Film Festival on November 13, 2016.

In 2018, he played a supporting role in the CTV police procedural television series The Detail. Developed by Ley Lukins who served as co-showrunner and co-executive producer alongside Adam Pettle, The Detail was a 10-episode adaptation of the UK smash Scott & Bailey and starred Grimes-Beech as street-smart Detective Jacqueline “Jack” Cooper, who has keen investigative skills but a messy personal life. It was cancelled after one season.

== Filmography ==
=== Director ===
- 2008: Mookie's Law (short) (credited as Al Mukadam)
- 2010: Up & Down (short)
- 2010: Running Boy (short)
- 2010: Knock Knock (short)

=== Producer ===
- 2008: Mookie's Law (short) (credited as Al Mukadam)
- 2010: Up & Down (short)
- 2010: Running Boy (short)
- 2010: Knock Knock (short)
- 2011: Welcome Back (documentary)

=== Actor ===
==== Film ====
Year	Title	Role	Notes
2002	Rolie Polie Olie: The Great Defender of Fun	Wheelie	Voice; Direct-to-Video
2005	Anne: Journey to Green Gables	Gilbert Blythe	Voice; Direct-to-Video
2008	Mookie's Law	Mookie	Short Film; also directed by Ali Mukaddam (as Al Mukadam)
2010	Uniform	Victory Man	Short film
2011	Breakaway	Inderjit	
2015	Anxietyville	Jordan	
2015	People Hold On	Dan	
2016	Miss Sloane	Ross	
2017	Kodachrome	Leo	
2022	Nightalk	Tom	
2024	Home Free	Jamie	

==== Television ====
Year	Title	Role	Notes
1998–2000	Elliot Moose	Elliot Moose (voice)	Main role
1999	I Was a Sixth Grade Alien!	Second in Command	3 episodes
1999–2000	Mythic Warriors: Guardians of the Legend	Eldest Son / Young Pythias (voice)	2 episodes
1999–2001	Angela Anaconda	Johnny Abatti (voice)	Main role
2000–2002	Franklin	Fox (voice)	
2000–2001	Anne of Green Gables: The Animated Series	Gilbert Blythe (voice)	
2001–2004	Rolie Polie Olie	Wheelie (voice)	Recurring role
2001	Martin the Warrior: A Tale of Redwall	Felldoh (voice)	
2002	The Zack Files	Orwell	Episode: "Zack and White"
2002	Get a Clue	Gabe	TV movie
2002–2003	Degrassi: The Next Generation	Mohammed	3 episodes
2003	Soul Food	Teddy Davidson	Episode: "My Brother's Keeper"
2003–2005	Radio Free Roscoe	Ray "Pronto" Brennan	Main role
2005	The Blobheads	T.J.	4 episodes
2005	Tagged: The Jonathan Wamback Story	Toby	TV movie
2009	The Assistants	Heston Nidalu	4 episodes
2010	Unnatural History	Abrams	Episode: "Now You See Me"
2013–2015	Oh No! It's an Alien Invasion	Nate (voice)	Main Role
2014	Spun Out	Nelson Abrams	Main role, 26 episodes
2016	Second Jen	Lewis	TV series
2018	The Detail	Aaron Finch	TV series
2021	Pretty Hard Cases	Det. Taai Nazeer	TV series
2023	The Way Home	Brayden "Brady" Dhawan	TV series, Recurring role
2024	Late Bloomer	Akash Verna	TV series
2025	Ghosts	Neel	TV series, Season 4, Episodes 12, 15; Season 5 Recurring
2025	Doc	Jeremy Hardy	Episode: S01E10 "...Must Come Down"
