= Screech Owls =

Canadian mystery television series

- Genre: Mystery/Crime
- Based on: The Screech Owls by Roy MacGregor
- Starring: Jonathan Malen; William Greenblatt; Nicole Hardy; Fraser McGregor; Peter Oldring; Neil Crone; Nicole Dicker
- Music by: Jono Grant
- Country of origin: Canada
- Original language: English
- No. of series: 2
- No. of episodes: 27

Production
- Executive producer: Christina Jennings
- Producer: Moira Holmes
- Production locations: Toronto, Ontario
- Running time: 25 minutes
- Production companies: Oasis International; Shaftesbury Films; YTV Canada Inc. Corus Entertainment

Original release
- Network: YTV
- Release: September 1, 2000 – February 10, 2002

The Screech Owls is a Canadian mystery television series based on Roy MacGregor's The Screech Owls book series, that originally aired on YTV from September 1, 2000, to February 10, 2002. It was nominated for Best Children's or Youth Series or Program at the 16th Gemini Awards in 2001. Jonathan Malen was nominated at the Young Artist's Awards. In the USA, it was aired alongside other Canadian imports on Discovery Kids.

== Premise ==
The plot centers on "The Screech Owls", who are one of the great contenders of the Lapine Cup. They solve mysteries that are occurring in the town of Tamarack, between the games.

== Cast ==
- Jonathan Malen as Wayne "Nish" Nishikawa
- William Greenblatt as Travis Lindsay
- Nicole Hardy as Sarah Cuthbertson
- Fraser McGregor as Simon Milliken
- Peter Oldring as Mr. Dillinger
- Neil Crone as Muck Murno
- Nicole Dicker as Samantha McGuire

== Characters ==
- Wayne Nishikawa, called "Nish" by his friends, is the Screech Owls' captain. He enjoys joking and making pranks to his friends. Nish likes collecting hockey cards and loves T-shirts, baseball, and alternative music.
- Travis Lindsay has much natural ability and good leadership skills. He is a great skater and stickhandler. He is passionate about various sports.
- Sarah Cuthbertson is the best skater and one of the best point-scorers on the team. Sarah is also considered one of the best upcoming female players in hockey.
- Simon Milliken is the smallest and most fearful Screech Owl, but he is the hardest working player on the team. He often joins the adventures of the Screech Owls.
- Mr. Dillinger is the assistant coach of the Screech Owls.
- Muck Murno is the coach of the Screech Owls.
- Samantha McGuire is a very talented girl originally from the West who joins the Screech Owls during the second season. The protagonists discover that her family was forced to move away all the time the older brother committed crimes. This changes when the family settles in Tamarack; Sam, not wanting to abandon her new friends, encourages her brother to change his life.
