= Prancer Returns =

- DVD cover
- Directed by: Joshua Butler
- Written by: Greg Taylor
- Produced by: Oscar L. Costo
- Starring: John Corbett; Stacy Edwards; Michael O'Keefe; Jack Palance; Robert Clark
- Cinematography: Bruce Worrall
- Edited by: Sean Albertson
- Music by: Randy Miller; Kristin Wilkinson
- Production companies: Gypsy Films International Inc. Raffaella Productions; USA Cable Entertainment; Via Genesis Productions
- Distributed by: USA Home Entertainment (VHS); Universal Studios Home Video (DVD)
- Release date: November 20, 2001
- Running time: 91 minutes
- Countries: United States; Canada
- Language: English
- Budget: $4 million

Prancer Returns is a 2001 fantasy drama film. It serves as a direct-to-video sequel to the 1989 film Prancer.

Alecia Elliott recorded the theme song "If You Believe" for the movie and soundtrack.

== Plot ==
Preteen siblings from a broken marriage live with their mother, Denise, in Three Oaks, Michigan. Ryan, the oldest, wants to go live with their father in Chicago. This confuses shy Charlie, the youngest, who is also the butt of bigger school kids' often mean pranks. Then he finds a reindeer on his way home from school, which he believes to be Prancer's son, also called Prancer, which he tries to hide at home. Ryan's help bonds him and Charlie again. Alas, when Prancer gets out, evil vice principal James is bitten and wants him put down. Charlie runs away with his protégé. Denise struggles, but her brother's old friend, handyman Tom, comes to Charlie's rescue.

== Cast ==
- John Corbett as Tom Sullivan
- Stacy Edwards as Denise Holton
- Michael O'Keefe as James Klock
- Jack Palance as Old Man Richards
- Robert Clark as Ryan Holton
- Gavin Fink as Charlie Holton
- Hayley Lochner as Jamie
- Jonathan Malen as Scott
- Richard Banel as Horace
- J.C. Kenny as Charlotte Purcell
- Reg Dreger as Three Oaks' Mayor
- Doe as Prancer
- Darren T. Knaus as Prancer (vocal effects; uncredited)

== Reception ==
On Rotten Tomatoes, the film has 2 reviews listed, both are positive.
