= Daniel Clark (actor) =

Canadian actor & singer (born 1985)

- Born: Daniel Allen Clark; October 14, 1985 (age 41); Chicago, Illinois, U.S.
- Education: New York University
- Occupations: Actor, reporter, producer
- Years active: 1997–present
- Height: 1.73 m (5 ft 8 in)
- Children: 1
- Relatives: Robert Clark (brother)

Daniel Allen Clark (born October 14, 1985) is an American-born Canadian actor and news producer. Clark is best known for his role as Sean Cameron on the Canadian CTV series Degrassi: The Next Generation and as Steve Rendazo in the 2007 film Juno.

== Early life ==
Clark was born in Chicago, Illinois. He has two younger brothers: Robert Clark, who starred in The Zack Files and Strange Days at Blake Holsey High, and Aaron Brown.

Clark was raised in Toronto, Ontario.

== Career ==
At age 12, his first role was Chip in a stage production of Disney's Beauty and the Beast in 1997.

He made a number of appearances on TV series, including Eerie Indiana: The Other Dimension, Goosebumps and Are You Afraid of the Dark?, and featured roles in films such as Grizzly Falls and Fizzy Bizness. In 2000, he also appeared in ABC's The Wonderful World of Disney television film Model Behavior, along with Justin Timberlake.

From 1999 to 2000, Clark portrayed Tim "The Friend" Thomkins on the children's TV show I Was a Sixth Grade Alien!, along with future Degrassi co-star Ryan Cooley. He was nominated in 2000 for "Best Performance in a TV Comedy Series" as "Supporting Young Actor" for his role in I Was a Sixth Grade Alien!.

In 2001, Clark took a regular role as Sean Cameron on Degrassi: The Next Generation from season 1 until season 4. He took a hiatus from Degrassi in mid-season 4, in the episode "Back In Black", and was absent until his return as a regular in season 6 in 2006. He once again left the show at the end of season 6, but returned in a final guest appearance in season 7 and he did not appear in Drake's Degrassi-reunited music video several years later.

With other actors from the series, Clark is the winner of the 2002 Young Artist Award for "Best Ensemble Actor", having been nominated again in 2003 and 2006.

In 2007, he appeared as Steve Rendazo in the film Juno. The following year, he starred in a Hallmark film opposite Amber Tamblyn called The Russell Girl. He also appeared on an episode of NBC's ER, titled "Blame it on the Rain".

Following his 2012 graduation from NYU, Clark started working as a news producer and writer for two telecast networks: ABC and MSNBC.

In 2014, Clark moved from New York and back to Toronto to join brother Robert in building a new business, RDC Management and Holdings. The company buys properties, renovates, and manages them. In 2015, the brothers first founded "eFresh Meals", a company that delivers a variety of healthy meals to buyers.

In 2020, Clark made his first return to the screen since the end of his Degrassi run. He starred as David Allen in the short comedy film Respect.

== Personal life ==
In 2012, he graduated from New York University. He majored in political science with a minor in business through the Stern School of Business. He had a baby (with his wife) in March 2025.

== Filmography ==
=== Film ===
Year	Title	Role	Notes
1999	Grizzly Falls	Young Harry	
2002	Fizzy Bizness	Max	
2007	Juno	Steve Rendazo	
2007	Left for Dead	Brady	
2020	Respect	David Allen	Short film

=== Television ===
Year	Title	Role	Notes
1998	Goosebumps	Mark Rowe	2 episodes
1998	Eerie Indiana: The Other Dimension	Stanley Hope	15 episodes
1999	Are You Afraid of the Dark?	Max	Episode: "The Tale of Oblivion"
1999	Real Kids, Real Adventures	Sean Redden	Episode: "Safety Net: The Sean Redden Story"
1999–2000	I Was a Sixth Grade Alien!	Tim "The Friend" Tomkins	22 episodes
2000	The Royal Diaries: Elizabeth 1 – Red Rose of the House of Tudor	Robin Dundley	Television movie
2000	The Wonderful World of Disney	Josh Burroughs	Episode: "Model Behavior"
2000	The City	Tres / Gavin Mackie	2 episodes
2001	The Zack Files	Mack	Episode: "But I'm Too Young to be my Dad"
2001–2008	Degrassi: The Next Generation	Sean Cameron	Main character, 101 episodes
2002	Earth: Final Conflict	Yuyln	2 episodes
2005	ER	Jason Digby	Episode: "Blame It on the Rain"
2005	Darcy's Wild Life	Aaron Shaw	Episode: "Slightly Used"
2008	The Russell Girl	Daniel Russell	Television movie

=== Web series ===
Year	Title	Role	Notes
2005–2007	Degrassi: Minis	Sean Cameron	13 episodes

== Awards and nominations ==
Year	Award	Category	Nominated work	Result	Ref.
2000	Young Artist Awards	Best Performance in a TV Comedy Series – Supporting Young Actor	I Was a Sixth Grade Alien!	Nominated	
2002	Young Artist Awards	Best Ensemble in a TV Series (Comedy or Drama)	Degrassi: The Next Generation	Won	
2003	Young Artist Awards	Best Ensemble in a TV Series (Comedy or Drama)	Degrassi: The Next Generation	Nominated	
2006	Young Artist Awards	Best Young Ensemble Performance in a TV Series (Comedy or Drama)	Degrassi: The Next Generation	Nominated	
