= Robert Clark (actor) =

American-Canadian actor

- Born: March 14, 1987 (age 39); Chicago, Illinois, U.S.
- Occupation: Actor
- Years active: 1999–2012

Robert Clark (born March 14, 1987) is an American-born Canadian actor and real estate investor. After building experience in singing, stage and limited television work in the 1990s, he went onto roles in various small screen productions, most notably The Zack Files and Strange Days at Blake Holsey High. Clark later became a 50% shareholder in a syndicate of 11 real estate holding companies referred to as Balboa et al. in court filings, that went insolvent.

== Life and career ==
Clark was born in Chicago, Illinois, and is the younger brother of Degrassi: The Next Generation star Daniel Clark. In 1988, his mother, Suzanne, relocated with her two sons to Boca Raton, Florida. When she remarried in 1991, the entire family moved to Canada, near Toronto. Clark joined the Belfountain Singers (based in Caledon, Ontario), and performed at various live concerts, both with the group and solo. The Singers performed at the 1997 Winter Special Olympics, and they also sang on the national talk show Open Mike with Mike Bullard. Clark (with his brother, Daniel) attended the Randolph School for the Performing Arts, and successfully completed the school's Kids Triple-Threat Musical Theatre Program.

=== Acting ===
Clark's very first professional acting role was opposite hockey player Wayne Gretzky in a television commercial for Honey Comb cereal. Under his mother's guidance, he used his previous singing experience in auditions for stage productions such as Ragtime (1998) and Beauty and the Beast, though he lost the role in the latter to his brother. He subsequently managed to clinch a recurring role in the television show I Was a Sixth Grade Alien (starring his brother), and made several guest appearances in programs such as Eerie, Indiana: The Other Dimension (also starring his real-life brother), Real Kids, Real Adventures, and Twice in a Lifetime.

Clark's acting career was limited to the small screen, however; in Superstar (1999), Clark was Eric Slater (Harland Williams) as a child. He later won small parts in a few television movies: Switching Goals (1999) with Mary-Kate and Ashley Olsen, as a Goth in The Ride (2000), and in All-American Girl: The Mary Kay Letourneau Story (2000), as the son of real-life convicted child rapist Mary Kay Letourneau.

In Rated X (2000), a fact-based film directed by and starring Emilio Estevez, Clark played the younger version of Charlie Sheen's character; a boy physically abused by his father who would grow up to become an adult film director. Following this, Clark had a more prominent role as a street windscreen wiper who donates his life savings of $4.30 to a murder investigation in the A&E Network's original film The Golden Spiders: A Nero Wolfe Mystery, the pilot for the A&E series A Nero Wolfe Mystery. Variety's Steve Oxman spoke highly of the production, calling the cast "a stellar ensemble" and noting that "the performances are more than the sum of their parts".

His first lead role came in the science fiction television show The Zack Files (2000), which its creators described as "an X-Files for kids". The show lasted just two seasons, but for his efforts Clark won a Young Artist Award for Leading Young Actor in a Drama Series, and producer John Delmage said that Clark and his co-stars were chosen for their acting ability and had the potential to maintain careers in the profession as adults.

The filming schedule for The Zack Files was tight, but Clark found time to participate in other projects. He played the son of a sex addict (Harry Hamlin) in Sex, Lies & Obsession (2001), and also acted opposite John Corbett in the Christmas film Prancer Returns (2001), which went direct-to-video but was praised by critic Scott Weinberg, and earned Clark another Young Artist Award.

Shortly after the cancellation of The Zack Files, Clark was cast in a similar television series, Strange Days at Blake Holsey High, which was first broadcast in the autumn of 2002. Clark's acting performance was well-received; in addition to another Young Artist nomination, Family Screen Scene called the show as a whole "well written and acted. The looks and mannerisms of the teens fit their characters, adding realism to their roles". While Strange Days was on the air, Clark could be seen in the Sci-Fi Channel's Deathlands (2003), as the young son of a deceased future king who narrowly escapes death at the hands of his power-hungry brother.

In an April 2005 episode of Veronica Mars, Clark played an openly gay teenager recruited by the title character (Kristen Bell) to publicly humiliate the prejudiced ex-boyfriend (Jeff D'Agostino) of one of her friends (Natalia Baron). Reviewing the episode, John Ramos of the website Television Without Pity commented positively on Clark's appearance, making an earnest request to "give the gay kid more screen time". Clark also had a supporting role as one of the ten children of a 1950s housewife (Julianne Moore) in the film drama The Prize Winner of Defiance, Ohio, released to theatres in late 2005.

=== Investor ===
Clark later established SID Developments, a company which bought and renovated rental properties in various Ontario cities, predominantly in the Northern Ontario region. The company filed for bankruptcy protection in early 2024. In June of that same year, the CBC reported that corporations linked to Clark had spent millions of investors' money on illegitimate expenses.

== Filmography ==
| Year | Title | Role | Notes |
|---|---|---|---|
| 1999 | Superstar | Young Eric Slater | Theatrical release; credited as "Robert Clarke" |
| 1999 | Switching Goals | Helmet Head | |
| 2000 | All-American Girl: The Mary Kay Letourneau Story | Steven Jr. | |
| 2000 | Rated X | Teenage Artie | Cable release following Sundance premiere |
| 2000 | The Golden Spiders: A Nero Wolfe Mystery | Pete Drossos | Pilot for the A&E TV series A Nero Wolfe Mystery (2001–2002) |
| 2000 | The Ride | Evan | |
| 2000–2002 | The Zack Files | Zack Greenburg | Television series; cancelled in 2002 |
| 2001 | Sex, Lies & Obsession | Ryan Thomas | |
| 2001 | Prancer Returns | Ryan Holton | Direct-to-video release |
| 2002–2006 | Strange Days at Blake Holsey High | Vaughn Pearson | Television series; concluded in 2006 |
| 2003 | Deathlands | Young Ryan Cawdor | Uncredited |
| 2005 | Veronica Mars | Seth Rafter | episode "M.A.D." |
| 2005 | The Prize Winner of Defiance, Ohio | Dick Ryan At 16 yrs | Theatrical release |
| 2007–2008 | Life with Derek | Patrick | 2 episodes |
| 2009 | Nonsense Revolution | Tom | Main role |
| 2010 | Warehouse 13 | Gary | 1 episode |

== Awards ==
Awards and nominations
| Year | Award | Category | Title of work | Result |
|---|---|---|---|---|
| 2001 | Young Artist Award | Best Performance in a TV Drama Series: Leading Young Actor | The Zack Files | Won |
| 2002 | Young Artist Award | Best Performance in a TV Movie (Comedy or Drama): Supporting Young Actor | Prancer Returns | Won |
| 2003 | Young Artist Award | Best Performance in a TV Comedy Series: Guest Starring Young Actor | Strange Days at Blake Holsey High | Nominated |
