= The Blobheads =

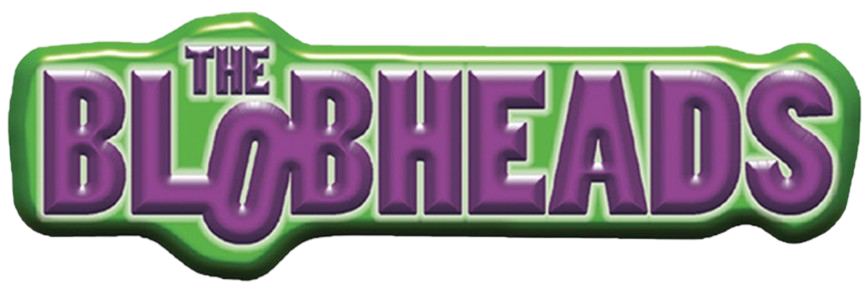
- Genre: Drama; Sitcom; Animation
- Created by: Howard Busgang
- Based on: "The Blobheads" by Paul Stewart and Chris Riddell
- Starring: Jonathan Malen; John Fitzgerald Jay; Shauna MacDonald; Luca and Sebastian Punzo
- Theme music composer: Steve D'Angelo and Terry Tompkins
- Composer: Pure West
- Country of origin: Canada
- Original language: English
- No. of seasons: 1
- No. of episodes: 26

Production
- Executive producers: Neil Court; Steven DeNure; Richard Langridge; Howard Busgang
- Producers: John Delmage; Beth Stevenson
- Production locations: Toronto, Ontario
- Editors: Pete Watson; Mark Sanders
- Running time: Approx. 22 minutes
- Production companies: Wark Clements; Decode Entertainment

Original release
- Network: CBC Kids (Canada); Nickelodeon UK (United Kingdom)
- Release: September 2, 2003 – February 24, 2004

The Blobheads is a Canadian live-action-animated sitcom that premiered on CBC in 2003. The show follows Billy Barnes and three blob-headed aliens, Derek, Kerek, and Zerek. The aliens hail from the planet Blob and wish to protect the Most High Emperor of the Universe—Billy's baby brother, Silas.

The Blobheads was well received due to its distinctive and innovative style. Co-produced by DECODE and C.O.R.E. Digital Pictures, the series, aimed at 8-12 year olds, is based on the popular book series created by Paul Stewart and Chris Riddell and published by Macmillan (UK).

The series was Animated VFX Live Action by Absolute Studios in Glasgow, Scotland by Andy Russell.

== Premise ==
14-year-old Billy Barnes thought his life was complicated when his baby brother Silas arrived, but now the morphing, mess-making Zerek, Kerek and Derek have come from the Planet Blob to declare that Silas is the Most High Emperor of the Universe.

Arriving on earth through their Travel Portal (otherwise known as Billy's toilet) the Blobheads announce that they must take Silas back to Planet Blob. But the Portal closed so now their stuck on Earth, and Billy is stuck with them.

Determined to fulfill their mission, Derek and Zerek have moved into Billy's bedroom to take care of Silas and protect him from their arch-nemesis, Evil Sandra.

== Cast ==
=== Voice actors ===
- Derek (Voice by Gary Martin)
- Kerek (Voice by Paul Panting)
- Zerek (Voice by Paul Panting)

=== Live action actors ===
- Billy Barnes (portrayed by Jonathan Malen)
- Kiki Barnes (portrayed by Shauna MacDonald)
- Ms.Tyler (portrayed by Geri Hall)
- Melissa (portrayed by Paula Brancati)
- Silas Barnes (portrayed by Luca Punzo & Sebastian Punzo)
- T.J. (portrayed by Al Mukadam)
- Simon Barnes (portrayed by John Fitzgerald Jay)
- Wendy (portrayed by Megan Park)
- Misty (portrayed by Ashley Leggat)
- Off Camera Reader (portrayed by Chris Cottrell)
- Off Camera Reader (portrayed by Stephen Sparks)
- Luke Stinson (portrayed by Rob Tinkler)
- Scab Damage (portrayed by Lawrence Bayne)
- Roy (portrayed by Carter Hayden)
- Melnick (portrayed by Michael D'Ascenzo)
- Cameraperson (portrayed by Tanya Kim)
- Nurse Hollinger (portrayed by Ellen McKinney)
- Nanna (portrayed by Anne Butler)
- Girl Guide (portrayed by Caroline Murchie)
- Garage Sail Lady (portrayed by Araby Lockhart)
- Stand In (portrayed by Mimi Pineau)

== Broadcast ==
The Blobheads was Premiering on Kids CBC on September 2, 2003, Through January 22, 2004 and also aired on Nickelodeon (British and Irish TV channel), Nickelodeon (Australia and New Zealand) and Nickelodeon (European TV network) and French Dub on Vrak & Canal J & German dub on ZDF and Arabic dub on MBC 4

== Episodes ==
No.	Title	Directed by	Written by	Original release date	Prod. code
1	"The Blobs Drop In"	Graeme Lynch; Donnie Anderson	Unknown	September 2, 2003	101
Billy decides to write a paper revealing how he met the Blobs. This unexpectedly leads to him finally making a friend at school. However, the Blobs are convinced she is actually their arch nemesis, Evil Sandra in disguise. When Billy brings her over to the house all chaos breaks loose. Meanwhile, Simon frets over his lost rock and roll days.
2	"The Emperors New Tutor"	Jonathan A. Rosenbaum; Donnie Anderson	Unknown	September 9, 2003	102
While Billy is having trouble with his studies, the Blobs decide it is time for Silas' education to begin. And to Billy's dismay, they have chosen Ms Tyler as his tutor. Meanwhile, Simon struggles with writer's block.
3	"Garglejuice"	Unknown	Unknown	September 16, 2003	103
Everyone needs a cool image to be noticed. Simon experiments with rock-costumes, Melissa buys new shoes and Billy decides to get braces. But while at the dentist, the Blobs discover a supply of mouthwash; or as they call it, "Garglejuice".
4	"Adventures in Blobsitting"	Unknown	Unknown	September 23, 2003	104
With Billy's school dance and Kiki's realty meet n' greet on the same night, the Barns are desperate for a baby sitter. Billy has his heart set on asking Melissa to the dance, but before he can find the courage, she is chosen to baby sit. To make matters worse, the Blobs are convinced she is plotting to harm Silas.
5	"Cure for the Uncommon Cold"	Jonathan A. Rosenbaum; Donnie Anderson	Al Schwartz	September 30, 2003	105
Billy finally earns himself a spot as an alternate on the school soccer team. Unfortunately his eagerness and excitement over his new 'athlete' status at school are overshadowed by a bad case of the flu. His Mom and his teacher Ms. Tyler order Billy home to bed. The Blob's are worried that Billy's sickness will infect Billy's little brother 'The Emperor'. In an effort to save The Emperor the Blobs invent an instant cure for the Flu, which miraculously cures Billy. However, Zerek is not so lucky and ends up catching Billy's flu bug. Billy drinks Derek miracle cure before he can right down the ingredients and Zerek is stuck suffering with the Flu. Meanwhile in an effort to clear his musician's block Billy's dad sells his beloved guitar Betty. When he finally realizes that his musician's block had nothing to with the guitar it is too late, or is it?
6	"A New House Is Not A New Home"	Unknown	Unknown	October 7, 2003	106
With two adults, a teenager, a baby, two Blobs and a hologram, it is time for the Barns to get a bigger house. Simon even gets a job to help pay for the move. But Billy and the Blobs are against the idea and must find a way to stop it. Meanwhile, Melissa is angry at Billy for having "imaginary friends".
7	"The Os-Barnes"	Steve Wright; Donnie Anderson	Brent Piaskoski	October 14, 2003	107
The Barne family is chosen to be the latest reality TV sensation. Could this mean popularity for Billy? A record deal for Simon? Better business for Kiki? Or will reality come crashing down on them? Meanwhile, the Blobs create their own reality TV show.
8	"Nanna"	Chris Bould; Donnie Anderson	Anita Kepila	October 21, 2003	108
The Barns household is turned upside down when Simon's mother comes for a visit. Also, Billy is jealous of a new student who Melissa has a crush on. Does one of these newcomers pose a threat to the emperor? Guest star: Kyle Schmid as Elan Stephan
9	"Evil Sandra"	Chris Bould; Donnie Anderson	Unknown	October 28, 2003	109
There is a new girl in school. She is pretty, nice and actually likes Billy. Could this be the girl of Billy's dreams, or is it just Evil Sandra in yet another disguise? Meanwhile, Simon becomes Kiki's assistant.
10	"Blobs, Lies and Audiotape"	Don McCutcheon; Donnie Anderson	Chris Riddell; Al Schwartz	November 4, 2003	110
Billy and Zerek discover the benefits of lying. Billy exaggerates about his father's friendship with rock star, Scab Damage to gain popularity. Unfortunately, Simon and Scab are actually bitter enemies. Also, Zerek finds himself in trouble after lying about the emperor's progress.
11	"Home Sweet Home"	Unknown	Unknown	November 11, 2003	111
Derek and Zerek convince their Blob supervisor Kerek to let them return home to Planet Blob for the Holiday "Blobgiving". While the Blob's are gone Billy agrees to look after his baby brother "The Emperor" but first he must endure Kerek's relentless training. At the same time Simon decides that he misses living in England. As a result Simon decides he's going to cook an old fashioned British feast. On top of everything Billy's teacher Ms.Tyler is undergoing "sensitivity training". With so much going on will Billy survive Ms. Tyler, Simons cooking and Kereks "baby boot camp"?
12	"It's My Party"	Unknown	Steven Westren	November 18, 2003	112
Parent teacher night is the best night of the year to throw a party. Billy's buddy TJ convinces him to throw a party at his house while his parents are out. However, Billy's mom Kiki finds out about the party and puts an end to their plans. The problem is the invitations are out and canceling the party is not an option. To make matters worse the Blob's are planning a party at Billy's house on the same night. Will this be the best party in the Universe or the end of Billy?
13	"Bloblet"	Unknown	Unknown	November 25, 2003	113
Billy is cast in the title role of his school production of Hamlet. His best friend Melissa gets the job of Director and immediately the chaos begins. Melissa does not have faith in Billy's acting ability and begins to take her job as Director a little too seriously. The Blobs overhear Billy and Melissa rehearsing at home one night and think that they have discovered a plot against "The Emperor" (Billy's baby brother). Kiki on the other hand is left wondering if the men in her life will ever get "real" jobs.
14	"A Blob Well Done"	Unknown	Unknown	December 2, 2003	114
Billy and Melissa are given the task of creating their own business as part of a class assignment. The fireworks start to fly when it comes time to decide on what kind of business to start. Melissa wants to open a flower shop but Billy ends up going into business with the Blobs. Simon's also got his own ideas for a business and begins designing his own "rock star" fashion line for babies. Will Billy and Melissa survive their class presentation? Will Simon's fashion line hit the big time?
15	"Shakesblob In Love"	Unknown	Chris Riddell; Eva Almos	December 9, 2003	115
Valentines Day is fast approaching and Billy does not know how to ask Melissa to be his Valentine. At the same time The High Council of Blob decides that it is time to arrange a marriage for the Emperor (Billy's baby brother). However, in order to do this Billy has to get married first. The Blobs hatch a plan to get Billy married but will it work? While planning Billy's marriage Kerek falls in love with Ms. Tyler, despite the fact that Blob/human relationships are forbidden. Simon has lost his romantic side and Kiki may be left alone on a Valentines Day that none of them will soon forget.
16	"Reality Bites"	Harvey Crossland; Donnie Anderson	Nicole Demerse	December 16, 2003	116
Kiki is depressed over a rival sales person stealing her business. As a result the entire Barnes household is put on a budget. The Blobs are reluctantly forced to eat less. Simon may actually have to get a real job. Worst of all, Billy is forced to work after school for Ms. Tyler in order to afford his school ski trip.
17	"The Good, The Blob, The Ugly"	Harvey Crossland; Donnie Anderson	Unknown	December 23, 2003	117
Billy has to defend his honour and fight the school bully after Melissa saves him in front of the whole cafeteria. Kerek fires Derek for sleeping on the job, which leaves Zerek in charge of "The Emperor" all by himself. Derek is really upset about losing his job and in order to prove himself he decides to help Billy in a showdown with the school bully. Will Zerek be able to handle looking after the Emperor all by himself? Will Derek ever get his job back? Will be survive his showdown with the school bully?
18	"Bringing up baby"	Unknown	Unknown	December 30, 2003	118
Melissa and Billy have to take care of a robotic baby as part of a class assignment. Melissa is determined to be the best parent in the class, but is she up for the challenge? Meanwhile, Billy's baby brother Silas is scheduled for his official coronation as "emperor". The coronation is scheduled to be televised live to the entire planet of Blob. The only problem is Kiki takes Silas to his grandparents for the weekend and The Blobs could be in big trouble.
19	"The Candidate"	Unknown	Unknown	January 6, 2004	119
Billy decides to run for class president when he realises no one else is running. However, the election turns into a big popularity contest when TJ decides to run against Billy. The Blobs have their own brush with democracy when they decide to hold their own elections.
20	"New Kid On The Blob"	Unknown	Unknown	January 13, 2004	120
Billy decides it is time to make some new "guy" friends at school. Only one problem, he has no idea how. Meanwhile, The Blob's are making new friends of their own by cloning themselves. As a result there are now two Zereks, Dereks, and Kereks. At the same time, much to the horror of Simon, Kiki becomes friends with Ms.Tyler. Will the Barnes house be able to handle the commotion with all the new friends?
21	"Stand by Your Blob"	Harvey Crossland; Donnie Anderson	Unknown	January 20, 2004	121
Billy gets a chance to present an award to his Basketball idol Wilt Berkley in front of the whole school. However, the opportunity to meet his hero maybe ruined when Derek comes down with a mysterious Blob illness. At the same time Simon and Kiki have left Billy and the Blobs home alone. They are of attending an induction ceremony for Saturn Lantern in to the "Legends of the 80's Rock n' Roll hall of fame and Wax museum".
22	"The Emperor's Garage Sale"	Dirk Campbell; Donnie Anderson	Howard Nemetz	January 27, 2004	122
When Billy's mum decides it is time to have a garage sale Billy and the Blobs stand to lose more than just their old stuff. Derek gives Billy "the book of krud", which is the holiest book on Blob. The book is accidentally sold at the garage sale and Billy has to get it back before its powers are released. At the same time, Zerek ends up getting "sold" at the garage sale as well and Simon is in danger of Kiki selling off all his old Saturn Lantern memorabilia.
23	"Close Encounters of the Blob Kind"	Unknown	Unknown	February 3, 2004	123
Billy enters into a photography contest at school. However, he gets more than he bargains for when a picture of Derek ends up winning the contest. The Blob's, fearing that their cover on Earth may be blown, decide to kidnap Silas back to planet Blob. Billy has to figure out a way to convince everyone that the photo was a fake and fast! Meanwhile, Simon is having a crisis of his own after the last member of the Saturn Lantern fan club decides to call it quits.
24	"Ready, Aim, Fired"	Unknown	Unknown	February 10, 2004	124
Ms. Tyler wins the teacher of the year award at school. Billy disagrees with the award and gets some help from the Blobs in digging up some dirt on her. The Blobs have no choice but to help Billy as they have been ordered to do so by The Emperor himself. However, Billy and the Blobs go to far when they plant a fake videotape that may get Ms. Tyler fired. Simon and Kiki are planning a reunion of Simons old band "Saturn Lantern" for charity. However, the old band members do not get along so well and a good thing goes bad when they all come together.
25	"My Big Fat Blob Wedding"	Unknown	Unknown	February 17, 2004	125
Billy and Melissa make plans to go to the prom together. Unfortunately, Kerek is scheduled to have a Blob wedding that same night and Billy is the best man. Derek and Zerek are crushed because Kerek is marrying their old sweetheart Ferek. As a result Billy is left juggling a date and a Blob wedding on prom night. Meanwhile, Simon takes Kiki to her first prom… Billy's!
26	"The Unbearable Likeness of Billy"	Don McCutcheon; Donnie Anderson	Unknown	February 24, 2004	126
Evil Sandra has apparently lost her appetite for power and has opened a chain of theme restaurants, or has she? Derek's suspicions are confirmed when Evil Sandra takes on Billy's form and invades the Barnes household. The real Billy is at Melissa's house pulling an all night study session in an effort to ace his final exam or he is stuck repeating grade 9. Meanwhile, mistakenly thinking that the "Evil Billy" is the real Billy, Simon attempts to tutor him so that Kiki will be able to take her long overdue "Family Vacation".

== Awards ==
On November 1, 2004, the studio received a Gemini nomination for animation, compositing, and effects work on "The Blobheads" television series. The nomination in the Best Visual Effects category at this year's 19th Annual Gemini Awards - the Canadian Television Awards Show - has the studio up against the stiffest of competition including Gene Roddenberry's Andromeda and Stargate SG-1.
