= Rajiv Surendra =

Canadian actor, artist, and writer

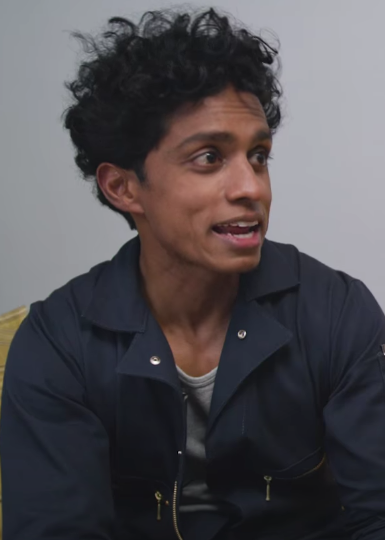
- Surendra in 2021
- Born: July 19, 1986 (age 40); Toronto, Canada
- Education: University of Toronto
- Occupations: Actor; artist; writer
- Years active: 2000–present
- Known for: Mean Girls
- Notable work: The Elephants in My Backyard

Rajiv Surendra (born July 19, 1986) (Note: Some sources indicate a birth year of 1988 or 1989, which contradicts several statements in his book The Elephants in My Backyard, such as being twelve when he auditioned for the TV series Goosebumps (which ended in 1998), and his audition for Mean Girls (filmed in 2003) coming after a hiatus at age sixteen.) is a Canadian American actor, artist, content creator, and writer. He is known for his portrayal of high school student Kevin Gnapoor in the 2004 teen comedy film Mean Girls and for his 2016 memoir, The Elephants in My Backyard, which chronicles his unsuccessful bid to win the lead role in the 2012 film Life of Pi.

== Early life ==
Surendra's parents immigrated to Canada from Sri Lanka. He grew up in Toronto, in a neighbourhood close to Toronto Zoo. He attended Wexford Collegiate School for the Arts as a musical theatre student and performer, graduating in 2003.

== Career ==
=== Acting ===
Among other roles, Surendra played Chuck Singh in the third season of the YTV sitcom System Crash (2000) and mathlete Kevin Gnapoor in the 2004 comedy film Mean Girls. After losing his bid for the lead role in the 2012 film Life of Pi, he decided to leave acting behind. He began reevaluating his life after that disappointment, saying, "It took a year for me to mourn the loss of what happened." Surendra subsequently worked as an au pair in Munich, Germany. On October 3, 2020, he appeared in a Mean Girls Reunion video on Instagram, with several original cast members, to encourage people to vote in the 2020 United States presidential election.

In November 2023, Surendra reprised his role as Kevin Gnapoor in a Mean Girls-themed Black Friday commercial for Walmart, alongside his original co-stars Lindsay Lohan, Lacey Chabert, Amanda Seyfried, and Daniel Franzese. The commercial shows that Kevin is now a proud dad, as the original cast return to the halls of North Shore High School, where a new crew of It girls rule the school.

=== Writing ===
In 2016, Surendra published the book The Elephants in My Backyard, a memoir of his failed attempt to win the lead role in the 2012 film Life of Pi. He read Life of Pi for the first time on the set of Mean Girls in 2004 and noticed many parallels between his own life and that of the novel's lead character, Piscine Molitor "Pi" Patel, including the fact that Surendra himself grew up in a home adjacent to the Toronto Zoo. To prepare for the role, Surendra temporarily dropped out of school at the University of Toronto and travelled to Pondicherry, India to learn the specific dialect of the character. Upon returning to Canada and going back to school, Surendra learned how to swim. While he did meet with the casting director of the film, Surendra was not selected to play the role of Pi. In a GQ interview, he said: "The project kept getting delayed. Three months turned into a year turned into four years. It was actually six years because of that year off. Life of Pi was attached to four different directors over the years, so every time a new director [came aboard], I'd go to the library and get out all the movies they had made and research that director. I worked really, really hard to try to get this part. In the end, they gave it to somebody else."

He reflected on these experiences in The Elephants in My Backyard. The book was longlisted for the 2017 edition of Canada Reads, and Surendra was nominated for the Kobo Emerging Writer Prize in 2017.

=== Fine arts and crafts ===
While working at Black Creek Pioneer Village in Toronto as a teenager, Surendra developed an interest in traditional crafts and antiques. As a result, he practices a number of traditional arts and crafts, including letter writing, calligraphy, bookbinding, and painting. He was an apprentice to Connecticut-based potter Guy Wolff, whose work has appeared in Martha Stewart Living magazine.

In 2010, Surendra founded Letters in Ink, a bespoke calligraphy and graphic design service based in Manhattan. He uses pen and ink and chalk to create art and branding for restaurants and other businesses.

In 2020, Surendra created a two-video YouTube series on the art of letter writing for the Morgan Library & Museum. Starting in 2021, he appeared in a series of videos posted on HGTV's YouTube channel, highlighting his personal collection of handmade objects, chalk art, bookbinding, and paper marbling. He created how-to videos, such as "A Beginner's Guide to Chalk Art" and "How to Be a Good Host", which eventually accumulated over eight million views and encouraged him to create his own channel.

In 2022, Surendra started a self-titled YouTube channel, which has garnered over 425,000 subscribers. The channel began with a GoFundMe, created after the success of Surendra's videos with HGTV, as a means of continuing to share his passions and interests. The videos on the channel are presented largely as tutorials, many of them on cooking, antiques, and crafts. The pilot of a planned lifestyle show hosted by Surendra, Homeboy, premiered on the streaming service Discovery Plus early that year.

== Personal life ==
Surendra is gay. As of February 2023, he lives in New York City. In 2024, he became an American citizen.

== Filmography ==
=== Film ===
List of film appearances, with year, title, and role shown
Year	Title	Role	Notes
2003	Fast Food High	Max	
2004	Mean Girls	Kevin Gnapoor	Also as performer: "The Mathlete Rap"
2005	6 ft. in 7 min.	Rajeev	Short film
2020	Mean Girls Reunion	Himself	Video

=== Television ===
List of television appearances, with year, title, and role shown
Year	Title	Role	Notes
2000	System Crash	Chuck Singh	13 episodes
2003	Radio Free Roscoe	Barney Oscarson	Episode: "Political in Pink"

=== Commercials ===
Year	Title	Brand	Role
2023	"Walmart Black Friday Deals"	Walmart	Kevin Gnapoor
