= System Crash =

Canadian sketch comedy television show

- Created by: Josh Morris
- Starring: See below
- Country of origin: Canada
- No. of seasons: 4
- No. of episodes: 45

Production
- Running time: 30 minutes
- Production company: A Weirdopolis TV Inc. Production for Corus Entertainment

Original release
- Network: YTV
- Release: March 14, 1999 – December 9, 2001

System Crash is a Canadian youth sketch comedy television series, which aired on YTV from March 14, 1999, to December 9, 2001.

The series centred on a group of students in a junior high school media club, telling the events of their fictional school, Lambton Junior High, in the past week. Each episode usually had a theme, e.g. parents.

== Recurring segments ==
- Fly on the Wall - Uses hidden cameras to show what happens when no one is looking (e.g. why girls go to the bathroom in pairs and what do they do once they're in there?)
- Burnbaum Helps - Burnbaum helping people. However, it always ends badly for the person that asks for help. It was replaced with Battleford Helps when Burnbaum left the show.
- Canadian Council for Concerned Kids - Zoe's informative 'public service announcement' styled segment, providing important messages to adults on the way they should treat and interact with their children.
- Garage Band - During the first season (1999), several of the episodes ended with a Garage Band segment. It featured members of the Canadian band Serial Joe playing humorous songs with the principal cast.
- Lambton News - Talks about current events. Hosted by Carla Waller in the first season and Emily Pereira afterwards.
- Sports Update - An update on sports at the school. Hosted by Wedgie Goldstein in the first season and Noogie Monoham (Zach Pettiford) afterwards.
- Lambton Legends - Looking back at various legendary athletes and other famous Lambton alumni.
- Lambton Home Shopping - Beau Peterson sells useless products and inventions to the students of Lambton via a Home Shopping Network styled-show.
- Movie Spoofs - Movies of all kinds were constantly spoofed - Examples include Gladiator, Cast Away, Star Wars, The Maltese Falcon, The Incredible Hulk, The Matrix, E.T., Jaws, etc.
- Kyle's Notes - Kyle Cooper giving unreliable lectures and his notes. This was used during the first season and ended when Ryan Field left the show.

== Cast ==
=== Season 1 ===
- Nathaniel Siegler as Nathan Burnbaum
- Haleigh Sheehan as Zoe McLaughlan-Fernandez
- Kendra FitzRandolph as Bridget Hendrickson
- Tony Del Rio as William 'Tek' Gibson
- Ryan Field as Kyle Copper
- Alithea Watters as Carla Waller
- Shamba Amani as Mr. Cooper

=== Season 2 ===
- Nathaniel Siegler as Nathan Burnbaum
- Haleigh Sheehan as Zoe McLaughlan-Fernandez
- Kendra FitzRandolph as Bridget Hendrickson
- Tony Del Rio as William 'Tek' Gibson
- Owen Rotharmel as Beau Peterson

=== Season 3 ===
- Nathaniel Siegler as Nathan Burnbaum
- Haleigh Sheehan as Zoe McLaughlan-Fernandez
- Kendra FitzRandolph as Bridget Hendrickson
- Owen Rotharmel as Beau Peterson
- Rajiv Surendra as Chuck Singh

=== Season 4 ===
- Haleigh Sheehan as Zoe McLaughlan-Fernandez
- Owen Rotharmel as Beau Peterson
- Connor Lynch as Bobby Battleford
- Esmeralda Smith-Romero as Samantha Briggs
- Nathan Stephenson as James Alexander
