= Michael Seater =

Canadian actor (born 1987)

- Born: Michael Bruce Patrick Seater; January 15, 1987 (age 39); Toronto, Ontario, Canada
- Occupations: Actor; director; screenwriter; producer
- Years active: 1997–present
- Known for: The Zack Files; Strange Days at Blake Holsey High; Life with Derek; 18 to Life

Michael Bruce Patrick Seater (born January 15, 1987) is a Canadian actor, director, screenwriter, and producer. His most notable roles are Spencer Sharpe in The Zack Files, Lucas Randall in Strange Days at Blake Holsey High, Tom Bellow in 18 to Life, and Derek Venturi in Life with Derek. He later portrayed James Gillies in Murdoch Mysteries, from 2009 to 2017.

Aside from acting, Seater has ventured into filmmaking, with the independent feature films People Hold On (2015) and Sadie's Last Days on Earth (2016), which he wrote, directed, and co-produced.

== Early life ==
Seater was born and raised in Toronto, Ontario. He attended the Etobicoke School of the Arts and worked as a child actor.

== Career ==
=== Early work ===
Seater began acting in the late 1990s and appeared in the short films, direct-to-video films, made-for-television films, several television series.

Seater voiced the title character in the series Mattimeo: A Tale of Redwall, which aired in 2000, starred as Lucas Randall in the television series Strange Days at Blake Holsey High, which began airing in 2002 and ended in 2006, and had a role in the 2005 film The Prize Winner of Defiance, Ohio, which starred Julianne Moore. Seater then appeared in the recurring role of Owen on the series ReGenesis, which ended after its fourth season.

=== 2005–2014: Life with Derek and further acting work ===
Seater garnered wider public recognition for his role as Derek Venturi on the popular Canadian family sitcom, Life with Derek, which was a hit with teens at the time. Seater starred on the series from its premiere in 2005 to its finale in 2009, for a total of 70 episodes and four seasons. Before the show's cancellation, Seater had written a script for an episode of the fourth season with his brother, Graham.

In 2009, following the conclusion of Life with Derek, Seater played a character in the Degrassi movie Degrassi Goes Hollywood and in 2010 he starred in the CBC series 18 to Life. He also played the recurring role of murderer and criminal mastermind James Gillies in the Canadian series Murdoch Mysteries.

From 2012 to 2013, Seater also had a recurring role on the Canadian television series Bomb Girls. He also appeared in Bomb Girls: Facing the Enemy, a television film based on the series.

=== 2015–present: Transition into filmmaking ===
In 2015, Seater wrote and directed the feature film People Hold On, which was nominated for a Canadian Screen Award for Best Original Song (by Noah Reid). The film premiered at the Cinefest Sudbury International Film Festival in 2015. It received mixed reviews from critics.

In 2016, Seater wrote and directed his second feature film, Sadie's Last Days on Earth, which was produced by Shaftesbury Films. It was released on December 9, 2016, in theatres. It received mostly negative reviews from critics, and scored a 40% on Rotten Tomatoes.

== Personal life ==
Seater identifies as queer, and had input into the creation of his character James, a gay man, on The Wedding Planners. He is close friends with his Life with Derek co-star Ashley Leggat. He has spoken publicly about the struggles of working in the industry as a child actor, in the wake of the documentary film Quiet on Set in 2024.

== Filmography ==
=== Film ===
Year	Title	Role	Notes
1997	Night of the Living Dead	Zack	Short film
1997	Future Fear	Young Daniel	
1999	The Stone Skipper	Simon	Short film
2005	The Prize Winner of Defiance, Ohio	Bub Ryan (age 15)	
2012	Adventures in the Sin Bin	Brian	
2012	Water's Edge	Lorne	Short film Writer; Producer
2013	Bank$tas	Neal	
2014	Sly Cad	Jack	Short film Writer; Director; Producer
2015	People Hold On	n/a	Writer; Director; Producer
2015	Flush	n/a	Writer; Director; Producer
2016	Sadie's Last Days on Earth	Calvin	
2017	The Definites	Fitz	
2019	Majic	Eastman	

=== Television ===
Year	Title	Role	Notes
1998	Rescuers: Stories of Courage: Two Couples	Peter	TV film
1998–1999	Noddy	Grit	4 episodes
1999	Twice in a Lifetime	Steven Stovall (age 12)	Episode: "Death and Taxes"
1999	Real Kids, Real Adventures	Robby Naylor	Episode: "Desert Rescue: The Robby Naylor Story"
1999	Vanished Without a Trace	J.J. Porterson	TV film
1999	Jenny and the Queen of Light	Eli	TV film
1999–2000	Noddy		2 episodes
2000	Dirty Pictures	Ian Barrie	TV film
2000–2001	Redwall	Mattimeo (voice)	13 episodes
2000–2002	The Zack Files	Spencer Sharpe	Main role; 52 episodes
2001	I Was a Rat	Pikey	Miniseries
2002–2006	Strange Days at Blake Holsey High	Lucas Randall	Main role; 42 episodes
2003	On Thin Ice	Jason McCartle	TV film
2004	Wild Card		Episode: "Dr. Sidney Loses a Kidney"
2005	Cyber Seduction: His Secret Life	Nolan Mitchell	TV film
2005–2009	Life with Derek	Derek Venturi	Lead role Writer - 2 episodes
2006	Shades of Black: The Conrad Black Story	Young Conrad Black	TV film
2006–2007	ReGenesis	Owen	Recurring role
2007	Naturally, Sadie	Cole	Episode: "As the Whirly Turns"
2007	She Drives Me Crazy	Pete Valenti	TV film
2009	Degrassi Goes Hollywood	Michael Ray	TV film
2009	Family Biz	Warren Silverman	2 episodes Writer - Episode 17: "The Consultant"
2009–2017, 2023 & 2026	Murdoch Mysteries	James Gillies	Recurring role
2010	Vacation with Derek	Derek Venturi	TV film
2010–2011	18 to Life	Tom Bellow	Main role; 25 episodes
2013	Bomb Girls	Ivan Buchinsky	10 episodes
2013	Long Story, Short	Dave	4 episodes
2014	Bomb Girls: Facing the Enemy	Ivan Buchinsky	TV film
2016	The Brief	Scoot	Miniseries
2017–2018	Upstairs Amy	n/a	Director - 20 episodes
2019	Hudson & Rex	Tad Harrison	Episode: "The Mourning Show"
2019	Emerald Code	n/a	Direct and producer - 20 episodes
2020	The Wedding Planners	James Clarkson	Main role
2023	Life with Luca	Derek Venturi	TV film
