= Grizzly Falls =

- Theatrical release poster
- Directed by: Stewart Raffill
- Screenplay by: Richard Beattie
- Story by: Stuart Margolin
- Produced by: Allan Scott; Peter R. Simpson
- Starring: Bryan Brown; Tom Jackson; Oliver Tobias; Daniel Clark; Richard Harris
- Cinematography: Thom Best
- Edited by: Nick Rotundo
- Music by: Paul Zaza; David Reilly
- Production companies: Behaviour Communications; Behaviour Worldwide; Canadian Film or Video Production Tax Credit; Grizzly Productions (UK) Ltd. Le Sabre; The Movie Network; Norstar Entertainment; Western International
- Distributed by: Artisan Entertainment; Providence Entertainment; Hemdale Film Corporation
- Release dates: August 13, 1999 (Spain); November 5, 1999 (U.S. limited)
- Running time: 94 minutes
- Countries: Canada; United States; United Kingdom
- Language: English
- Box office: $168,874

Grizzly Falls is a 1999 adventure film about a boy named Harry Bankston and a bear named Mizzy, set in British Columbia in the early 20th century. It was written by Stuart Margolin and Richard Beattie, and directed by Stewart Raffill.

== Plot ==
The film starts with an old man, Harry Bankston telling his grandson Joshua Jr. and granddaughter Jennifer about his life as a young boy in the early 20th century.

The tale begins: Harry as a boy is in his pre-teens. His mother dies, and he is sent to a boarding school because his father Tyrone is abroad, so cannot look after him. Eventually Tyrone comes and takes him on a bear-hunting trip to Canada, to catch a grizzly bear.

When in British Columbia, Tyrone and Harry meet up with an experienced Native Canadian tracker with Scottish roots named Joshua McTavish. The three then go to a saloon to find some good hunters to help them on the hunt. The men in the saloon laugh at their plan, but some come along, bringing dogs and guns, including Grits, Genet and Lanky.

On the hunt, Harry sees two grizzly cubs which no one else sees, then rejoins Tyrone. The next day, the hunters capture the two cubs, and hold them in the camp, near a waterfall called Grizzly Falls. The bear mother is angry, and comes to the camp. Although she cannot free her offspring, she instead abducts Harry to exact revenge on Tyrone. She then runs away with him, and looks after him, feeding him, and once saving his life from timber wolves. He is at first intent on escaping from the bear, whom he names Mizzy, but eventually grows to love her.

Meanwhile Tyrone is intent on rescuing Harry, and Joshua comes along, but the men from the saloon and their dogs are hardly as keen. One breaks his leg at Grizzly Falls, and he and his friends leave, taking the bear cubs with them and setting up their own camp somewhere else. Tyrone and Joshua continue searching for Harry.

In another area, Harry stumbles upon the saloon men's new camp whilst Mizzy is finding food. He looks inside the hut where the men are sleeping, and wakes them up. One man tries to protect the boy but another points his gun at him. Just as this man is going to shoot, Mizzy bursts through the window, knocking down one wall of the hut. This crushes one man.

Tyrone and Joshua find the camp, and attack the men who are in it, while the bear runs to its chained-up cubs outside, trying to free them. The evil man gets up, but has no time to do anything because Tyrone shoots his hand, then leaps on him, and throttles him. They then begin a ferocious wrestle, which Tyrone wins, plunging his opponent into the river. Stream takes his corpse. Harry says goodbye to his bear-mother Mizzy, and she goes away into the mountains, reunited with her two cubs. Tyrone becomes a better father, having learned a lesson on the adventure.

== Cast ==
- Bryan Brown as Tyrone Bankston
- Tom Jackson as Joshua McTavish
- Oliver Tobias as Genet
- Daniel Clark as Harry Bankston
  - Richard Harris as Old Harry Bankston
- Marnie McPhail as Mrs. Bankston
- Brock Simpson as Lanky
- Colin Simpson as Grits
- Chantel Dick as Jennifer Bankston
- Trevor Lowden as Joshua Bankston Jr.

== Reception ==
On the review aggregator website Rotten Tomatoes, 53% of 8 critics' reviews are positive, with an average rating of 5.7/10. Metacritic, which uses a weighted average, assigned the film a score of 34 out of 100, based on 10 critics, indicating "generally unfavorable" reviews.

Lawrence Van Gelder from The New York Times gave the film a negative review, and said that the film "combines [an] old-fashioned boys' adventure with a heavy-handed modern lecture on parenthood. The film possesses a decent heart but suffers from a simple mind." Jack Mathews of the Daily News called it "a family adventure to be avoided by anyone considering a vacation to anything wilder than a zoo" in his 1½-star critique of the movie. Robin Rauzi of the Los Angeles Times said that "cinematographer Thom Best never captures the glory of the Canadian Rockies, and the uncredited editing is jarring and unconvincing in key action sequences. Hackneyed, too, are the scenes that bookend the film in which Harris as old Harry (he’d be 100 if he was 13 in 1913) retells the story to his grandkids. All might be forgiven if, in the end, Grizzly Falls amounted to something more than a camping bedtime tale, but alas, it does not." Nicole Campos of LA Weekly said that "the tale is an adventure that’s clearly intended as a family vehicle, but that would likely bore older kids, scare younger kids, and draw unintentional giggles from grown-ups every time a member of the cast pauses in the action—which is often, causing the narrative to sputter endlessly—to have an emotional revelation. When you don’t find yourself wondering about dialogue that’s drowned out by rushing rivers and footfalls in the brush, something is very wrong."

Jeanne Punter of The Toronto Star gave the film one star out of five and called it "an annoying, cloying father-and-son flick and, as a nature adventure, a complete contrast to To Walk With Lions", adding that it "is too scary for young kids and too painful for grownups. But Ali Oop, the famous grizzly-bear actor, is quite good as the grizzly bear." Dan Brown of the National Post said that "the problem with Grizzly Falls is that it's just not believable. To enjoy this Disneyesque buddy movie about a timid 13-year-old and a ferocious grizzly bear, viewers have to do much more than suspend their disbelief. They have to chuck common sense out the window as well." Conversely, Kathryn Greenaway of The Gazette viewed the film as "simply a lovely story about a bear and a boy".

Grizzly Falls was nominated for a Golden Reel Award in the category of Best Sound Editing - Foreign Feature.

== See also ==
- The Bear
- The Life and Times of Grizzly Adams
- King of the Grizzlies
  - The Bears and I
