= Heartstopper (film) =

- Directed by: Bob Keen
- Written by: Vlady Pildysh; Warren P. Sonoda
- Produced by: Kate Harrison; Lewin Webb
- Starring: Meredith Henderson; Nathan Stephenson; Robert Englund; Shell Galloway
- Cinematography: David Mitchell
- Edited by: Mitch Lackie
- Music by: Eric Cadesky; Nick Dyer
- Release date: October 31, 2006
- Running time: 85 minutes
- Country: Canada
- Language: English

Heartstopper (also known as Heart Stopper) is a 2006 straight-to-DVD horror film directed by Bob Keen and starring Robert Englund, Meredith Henderson, and Nathan Stephenson.

== Plot ==
Notorious serial killer Jonathan Chambers has been captured and detained by Sheriff Berger. Chambers is executed in the electric chair, but the police do not know that he survived by making a deal with the devil. His body is transported to a hospital for an autopsy examination.

Meanwhile, Sara Wexler is a lonely teenager who attempts to commit suicide by running in front of a car. However, she is only injured before being discovered by Berger who takes her to hospital. At the hospital Chambers now has supernatural powers and begins to slaughter everyone in the hospital, including Berger.

Sara and another teenager called Walter, who was sent to hospital after accidentally being impaled on his own rake, try to escape from the hospital but find that all exits are locked. Chambers then confronts Sara and explains that he needs her to help him because she has a power which will make him immortal. She declines the offer and flees from him. Eventually she defeats Chambers by opening a portal to hell and sending him through it. In the final scene, however, it is revealed that Chambers's personality has passed into her.

== Cast ==
Actor	Character
Meredith Henderson	Sara Wexler
Nathan Stephenson	Walter
Robert Englund	Sheriff Berger
James Binkley	Jonathan Chambers
Laura de Carteret	Denise Grafton

== Production ==
Filming lasted from 9 September 2005 to 13 November 2005, on a $3,000,000 budget.

== Release ==
The film was released on DVD in the United States on 31 October 2006 and in the UK on 18 December 2006.
