= Dark Oracle =

- Created by: Jana Sinyor
- Developed by: Jana Sinyor; Heather Conkie; Bonita Siegel (for YTV)
- Starring: Paula Brancati; Alex House; Jonathan Malen; Danielle Miller; Mark Ellis; Kristopher Turner
- Theme music composer: Gary Koftinoff
- Composer: Gary Koftinoff
- Country of origin: Canada
- Original language: English
- No. of seasons: 2
- No. of episodes: 26

Production
- Executive producers: Christina Jennings; Scott Garvie; Heather Conkie
- Producers: Ron Murphy (S1); Jana Sinyor; Suzanne French (S2)
- Running time: 23 minutes
- Production companies: Cookie Jar Entertainment (Note: Produced under the Coliseum brand name (a former Cookie Jar Entertainment label for shows not aimed at their main demographic of pre-school audiences at the time)); Shaftesbury Films

Original release
- Network: YTV
- Release: October 2, 2004 – June 1, 2006

Dark Oracle is a Canadian teen fantasy television series that premiered in 2004 on YTV. It was created by Jana Sinyor, and co-developed by Heather Conkie. In 2005, Dark Oracle won the International Emmy for Best Children's and youth program.

== Premise ==
Dark Oracle follows the adventures of teenage twins Cally and Lance Stone who discover a comic book that gives them clues about the future of their lives. As they are suddenly thrust into a comic book world of danger, fear and uncertainty, the twins learn that Dark Oracle has a hidden agenda that threatens their very existence. In a unique blend of live action and comic book style animation, the two confront their animated alter egos, Violet and Blaze, who possess the uncanny ability to manipulate their future. With events in the comic book world influencing ones in their own world, Cally and Lance struggle to stay one step ahead of their dark counterparts, or face a very unpleasant fate. The stakes become higher still, with Violet and Blaze trying to escape into the real world to wreak further havoc.

Dark Oracle starred Paula Brancati and Alex House as Cally and Lance Stone, along with Jonathan Malen as Dizzy, Lance and Cally's long-time childhood friend and Danielle Miller as Sage, who sparks Lance's interest.

"One of the things that drew us to Dark Oracle, is that it applies a strong high concept, of a comic book coming to life, to the lives of ordinary high school kids. Visually it is going to look amazing, and it is a terrific arena for great dramatic stories as Lance and Cally have to figure out how to deal with the predictions of the comic," explained Suzanne French, producer at Shaftesbury Films.

Dark Oracle's second season took a different turn from the first season, with the comic book characters intervening directly with the main cast. Dizzy and Sage learned about the comic and are going to have their own experiences with it.

== Cast and characters ==
=== Main ===
- Cally Stone (Paula Brancati): Twin sister of Lance, pretty and prides herself on being level-headed. She's also the last person who would believe in a comic book that could warp you into new worlds. When she finds herself surrounded by the supernatural, she's faced with believing that anything can happen. In the comic book she is the figure Violet.
- Lance Stone (Alex House): Cally's twin brother, prefers video games and comics to real people. Unlike his sister, he is very shy and tends to keep to himself. When he finds himself drawn into the comic world and meets Sage, this self-proclaimed oddball starts to come out of his shell. In the comic book he is the figure Blaze.
- Dizzy (Jonathan Malen): Lance's best friend, and like Lance he shares a passion for gaming and comics. It's no question that high school poses challenges for Dizzy, especially with his crush on Cally. But with a little time he is able to shake his geek persona and become not-quite-cool... but almost. After a while Lance and Cally decide to tell him about the comic book.
- Sage LaPierre (Danielle Miller): She works at Gamers Cave Comic Book Store and becomes Lance's girlfriend. She doesn't notice the supernatural events around her, although at one point she and Dizzy are told by Lance and Cally all about the comic book. She and Lance break twice over the course of the series due to the comic's influence. Vern has often tried to get her from Lance, but never succeeds.

=== Supporting ===
- Doyle (Mark Ellis): He is the owner of Gamers Cave Comic Book Store. He spends a great deal of time in the back of his store, which also doubles as a meeting place for the secretive club of Necromancers. Lance and Cally have a suspicion that he is somehow connected to the strange comic book.
- Annie (Barbara Mamabolo): She is Cally's best friend. She and Cally fight very often since the appearance of the comic. When they fight, Annie hangs out with Kathleen until they make up again. Annie will support Cally in almost everything. She disappears in season 2, never learning about the comic book, and is never mentioned again.
- Omen (Kristopher Turner): He was turned into a frog by Doyle so he could keep his magic under control. In the first episode of the series, Omen sees Lance and overhears his comment on "how you can learn a lot from a comic". Omen then uses the remainder of his magic to transform a previous comic into Dark Oracle. When Lance was invited to Doyle's gaming group, Omen escapes from his cage, hiding in Cally's backpack. Omen is unknowingly taken to the Stone household. Cally names him Nemo, getting the name from the comic. He doesn't regain his human form until Lance gives Nemo a kiss (taken from the story of the frog prince) and Omen's curse is lifted.
- Vern (David Rendall): He is a fellow goth classmate of Lance and Cally. He is neither a friend, nor a true enemy. He always hangs around Simone who might have feelings for him and tries to learn of the powers Omen and Doyle possess. Sometimes he causes trouble for the twins and other times he comes to their aid. Vern saved Lance's life when he was pushed into the mirror by Vern who meant it to be a harmless prank. The outcome was Lance's evil alter-ego taking over Lance's identity, but Vern helped Cally and her friends dispel him from Lance's body.
- Emmett (Nathan Stephenson): He begins to like Cally, but because of the comic, and Omen, their relationship ends.

== Episodes ==
=== Season 1 (2004–05) ===
No.	Title	Directed by	Written by	Original release date
1	"Dark Oracle"	Ron Murphy	Heather Conkie & Jana Sinyor	October 2, 2004
2	"Masquerade"	Ron Murphy	Heather Conkie & Jana Sinyor	October 9, 2004
3	"Meeting of the Quarter Moon"	Ron Murphy	Heather Conkie & Jana Sinyor	October 16, 2004
4	"Paintball Wizard"	Ron Murphy	Jana Sinyor	October 23, 2004
5	"Fashion Queen"	Craig Pryce	Heather Conkie & Jana Sinyor	November 6, 2004
6	"Scavengers"	Ron Murphy	Tony Elliott	November 13, 2004
7	"Crushed"	Craig Pryce	Nicole Demerse	November 20, 2004
8	"Recruitment"	Craig Pryce	Heather Conkie	November 27, 2004
9	"Idolized"	Craig Pryce	Heather Conkie	January 15, 2005
10	"Ticking Clock"	Ron Murphy	Jana Sinyor	January 29, 2005
11	"Trapped"	Ron Murphy	Jana Sinyor	February 5, 2005
12	"Marionette"	Ron Murphy	Heather Conkie	February 12, 2005
13	"Full Circle"	Ron Murphy	Heather Conkie & Jana Sinyor	February 26, 2005

=== Season 2 (2006) ===
No.	Title	Directed by	Written by	Original release date
14	"Boiler Room"	Phil Earnshaw	Heather Conkie & Jana Sinyor	March 9, 2006
15	"It Happened at the Dance"	Phil Earnshaw	Heather Conkie & Jana Sinyor	March 16, 2006
16	"Through a Glass Darkly"	Phil Earnshaw	Jana Sinyor	March 23, 2006
17	"The Game"	Benjamin Weinstein	R.B. Carney	March 30, 2006
18	"House Party"	Benjamin Weinstein	Skander Halim	April 6, 2006
19	"The Stalker"	Benjamin Weinstein	Jana Sinyor	April 13, 2006
20	"The Familiar"	Paul Fox	Tony Elliott	April 20, 2006
21	"Boot Camp"	Paul Fox	Nicole Demerse	April 27, 2006
22	"The Trouble with Babysitting"	Paul Fox	Heather Conkie	May 4, 2006
23	"Ghosts from the Past"	Paul Fox	Skander Halim	May 11, 2006
24	"Life Interrupted"	Ron Murphy	Heather Conkie	May 18, 2006
25	"Trail Blaze"	Ron Murphy	Jana Sinyor	May 25, 2006
26	"Redemption"	Ron Murphy	Heather Conkie	June 1, 2006

== Release ==
=== Home media ===
Mill Creek Entertainment released the complete series on DVD in Region 1 on August 17, 2010, which includes bonus episodes of Treasure and Mona the Vampire and the movie Sally Marshall Is Not an Alien.

== Accolades ==
Accolades received by Dark Oracle
Award	Year (Note: The listed year refers to the date of the ceremony, not necessarily the year in which the corresponding season or episode aired.)	Category	Recipients	Result	Ref.
Gemini Awards	2005	Best Writing in a Children's or Youth Program or Series		Nominated	
Gemini Awards	2005	Best Production Design or Art Direction in a Dramatic Program or Series		Nominated	
Gemini Awards	2005	Best Original Music Score for a Dramatic Series		Won	
