= Danielle Miller =

Canadian actress (born 1988)

Danielle Miller is a Canadian actress. She is best known for her work on Take This Waltz (2011), Childstar (2004) and Céline (2008). The biggest role she has had so far is that of Sage in Dark Oracle series.
