= The Screech Owls =

Book series by Roy MacGregor

Mystery at Lake Placid is the first book in the series.

The Screech Owls was a series of juvenile fiction novels by Canadian author Roy MacGregor. There were currently 30 titles in the series, all published by McClelland & Stewart.

== Summary ==
The series centers around a fictional hockey team, however it incorporates actual events and locations, such as the Quebec Peewee Invitational in Quebec, Canada. and the 1998 Winter Olympics and 2002 Winter Olympics in Nagano, Japan and Salt Lake City, United States, respectively.

There does not appear to be a clear time line of events in the series. Although MacGregor often refers back to events that occurred in previous books in the series, the static ages of the players and the seemingly never-ending hockey season contradict any definite time line.

The books themselves, all of which are told from the point of view of team captain, Travis Lindsay, provide light action and mystery for the young reader. Terrorists, murderers, kidnappers, ghosts and other improbable anomalies befall the preteen in between, and sometimes during, their hockey games and tournaments.

== Awards and recognition ==
The Screech Owls Series has won the Our Choice Award and the Manitoba Young Reader’s Choice Award. The series has also been shortlisted for several awards, including the Arthur Ellis Award.

== Adaptations ==
=== Television show ===
Screech Owls aired on YTV from September 1, 2000 to February 1, 2002. It was nominated for Best Children's or Youth Series or Program at the 16th Gemini Awards in 2001. Jonathan Malen was nominated at the Young Artist's Awards. In the USA, it aired alongside other YTV imports (including Mystery Hunters and Strange Days at Blake Holsey High) on Discovery Kids.

=== Animation Show ===
On October 06, 2026, Shaftesbury and Sphere Animation, in partnership with the National Hockey League (NHL) and Boat Rocker Studios announced a new animated action-adventure series, called Screech Owls, which is based on the book and the television show. Produced by P.K. Subban, it is set to launch Fall 2027 in English on Canadian Broadcasting Corporation and Winter 2028 in French on Radio-Canada and Télévision française de l'Ontario. The NHL has exclusive distribution rights within the United States and Nordics.

== Titles ==
1. Mystery at Lake Placid
2. The Night They Stole the Stanley Cup
3. The Screech Owls' Northern Adventure
4. Murder at Hockey Camp
5. Kidnapped in Sweden
6. Terror in Florida
7. The Quebec City Crisis
8. The Screech Owls' Home Loss
9. Nightmare in Nagano
10. Danger in Dinosaur Valley
11. The Ghost of the Stanley Cup
12. The West Coast Murders
13. Sudden Death in New York City
14. Horror on River Road
15. Death Down Under
16. Power Play in Washington
17. Secret of The Deep Woods
18. Murder at the Winter Games
19. Attack on the Tower of London
20. The Screech Owls' Reunion
21. Peril at the World's Biggest Hockey Tournament
22. Trouble at the Top of the World
23. Face-Off at the Alamo
24. Panic in Pittsburgh
25. The Mystery of the Russian Ransom
26. The Boston Breakout
27. Reality Check in Detroit
