= Jono Grant (Canadian musician) =

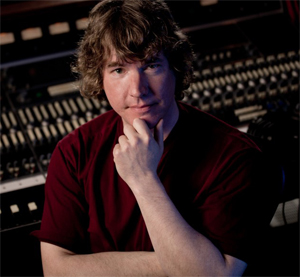
- Grant at Canterbury Studio 2014

Background information
- Born: Jonothan Jonas Grant; September 13, 1969 (age 57); Toronto, Ontario
- Occupations: Composer, producer, musician
- Website: victorydrive.com

Jonothan Jonas Grant (born September 13, 1969) is a Canadian composer, producer, and multi-instrumentalist who was nominated for a Genie Award for "Achievement in Music/Original Score" on his first film score Jacob Two Two Meets the Hooded Fang in 1999.

He was also nominated for a Gemini award in the category of "Best Original Music Score for an Animated Program or Series" in 2006 for the first episode of Captain Flamingo, an animated series created by Breakthrough Films and Television. Grant has created scores for many television series and films from his personal studio Victory Drive Music located in Toronto's Leslieville.

== Career ==
In the mid 1990s, Grant worked as a composer, producer, arranger, and performer with several bands including the eccentric jazz/lounge outfit Jaymz Bee and the Royal Jelly Orchestra. He produced their first three albums for BMG and co-wrote the debut album with lyricist Bee. The band toured across Canada and did multiple television appearances with Grant as musical director, keyboardist and guitarist. During this time Grant was introduced to pop artist John Southworth, producing and arranging on his first album: "Mars Pennsylvania" in 1996. That same year he also produced The Shuffle Demons album Get Right (Grant would later co-produce three Juno-nominated albums with Toronto Jazz saxophonist and Shuffle Demon Richard Underhill including the Juno award winning album Tales From the Blue Lounge).

In 1997, Grant was hired as an arranger on Kim Stockwood's EMI release Twelve Years Old and also produced and arranged her Christmas hit "Marshmallow World" for the EMI compilation Christmas at Home the following year Nearly a decade later, Grant and Stockwood created a full Christmas album titled I Love Santa, co-writing the title track, also for EMI. Grant arranged strings for The Tea Party (EMI) for a live Much Music simulcast performance featuring the song "Psychopomp" in the mid-summer of 1998. Then in 1999, Grant teamed up with Richard Underhill and Great Bob Scott in the Electro-Jazz improv band Astrogroove. They played a number of shows including the Montreal Jazz Festival and the Beaches International Jazz festival that same year. Grant produced the debut self-titled CD which was released in 2000.

At this time, Grant started working as a composer in film and television beginning with Jacob Two Two Meets the Hooded Fang in 1999. The feature was created by Shaftesbury Films, directed by George Bloomfield and starred Gary Busey, Miranda Richardson and Ice-T. His next film was MTV's Undergrads and Radio Free Roscoe for the Family Channel; both series were created by Decode Entertainment. He then did a variety of film and television work including the Shaftesbury series Screech Owls, Overruled and Life with Derek, Decode's Girlstuff/Boystuff and Captain Flamingo for Breakthrough Entertainment. During this period Grant continued to produce recording artists.

Grant scored the Lifetime film "An Officer and a Murderer", nominated for a 2014 Canadian Screen Award for "Best Original Score for a Program" and also scored Season 2 of the original Sprout series: "The Chica Show" for NBC Kids.

Grant produced Jon Stancer's 2017 release of the album "For The Birds".
