= The Wedding Planners =

Canadian TV series

- Genre: Romantic drama
- Starring: Kimberly-Sue Murray; Michael Seater; Madeline Leon
- No. of seasons: 1
- No. of episodes: 8

Production
- Production company: Brain Power Studios

Original release
- Network: Citytv
- Release: March 27 – May 8, 2020

The Wedding Planners is a Canadian television drama series, which premiered March 27, 2020 on Citytv. The series is produced by Brain Power Studios, founded and executive produced be Beth Stevenson.

== Premise ==
The series centres on the Clarksons, three estranged siblings who reconnect to carry on their mother's wedding planning business after her death.

== Cast ==
- Kimberly-Sue Murray as Paige Clarkson
- Michael Seater as James Clarkson
- Madeline Leon as Hannah Clarkson
- Michelle Nolden as Marguerite, their mother.
- Lanette Ware as Sally

== Episodes ==
No.	Title	Directed by	Written by	Original release date
1	"One Funeral, Two Weddings"	Unknown	Unknown	March 27, 2020
2	"Big Italian Wedding"	Unknown	Unknown	April 3, 2020
3	"Champagne Dreams, Beer Budget"	Unknown	Unknown	April 10, 2020
4	"Wedding of Champions"	Unknown	Unknown	April 17, 2020
5	"Sweet Home Wedding"	Unknown	Unknown	April 24, 2020
6	"A June Wedding"	Unknown	Unknown	May 1, 2020
7	"The Perfect Wedding"	Unknown	Unknown	May 8, 2020
