= Nathan Stephenson =

Canadian actor

- Born: Nathaniel Stephenson; July 27, 1986 (age 40); Toronto, Ontario, Canada
- Occupation: Actor
- Years active: 2001–2014; 2025

Nathaniel Stephenson (born July 27, 1986), credited as Nathan Stephenson, is a Canadian actor. He is best known for starring as Robbie "Question Mark" McGrath in the teen comedy-drama Radio Free Roscoe (2003–2005) and as James Alexander in the sketch comedy series System Crash (2001). He also had a recurring role as Griffin Pierce-Taylor, an HIV-positive university student, in Degrassi: The Next Generation (2007–2008).

== Early life ==
Stephenson was born in Toronto, Ontario. He began performing in community musical theatre as a child, including playing Judah in a production of Joseph and the Amazing Technicolor Dreamcoat. He attended Unionville High School in Markham, Ontario, where he was enrolled in the Arts York Drama program.

== Career ==
Stephenson made his television debut in 1999 on the YTV sketch comedy series System Crash, playing James Alexander, a member of the show's high school media club. He was 13 years old at the time.

In 2003, Stephenson was cast as Robbie "Question Mark" McGrath in Radio Free Roscoe, a Family Channel teen comedy-drama about four high school friends who operate an underground pirate radio station. The series also aired on The N in the United States. Stephenson appeared in all 52 episodes over four seasons. The series won the Gemini Award for Best Children's or Youth Fiction Program in 2005.

In 2007, Stephenson joined the cast of Degrassi: The Next Generation for its seventh season as Griffin Pierce-Taylor, an engineering student who is HIV-positive. The character, who was born with HIV due to his mother's drug use during pregnancy, enters a serodiscordant relationship with main character Paige Michalchuk; the storyline addressed themes of stigma and disclosure.

That same year, Stephenson appeared in the Disney Channel television film Twitches Too as Marcus WarBurton. His other credits include guest appearances on Naturally, Sadie, Dark Oracle, and The Dresden Files, as well as a supporting role as Gord in the 2010 Family Channel television film My Babysitter's a Vampire, which served as a pilot for the subsequent series.

Stephenson's later work consisted primarily of voice acting, including the role of Jasper in the animated series Pearlie (2009–2010). His final credited role was as Klaus in BeyWarriors: BeyRaiderz (2014).

== Filmography ==
Year	Title	Role	Notes
2001	System Crash	James Alexander	Main role
2003–2005	Radio Free Roscoe	Robbie "Question Mark" McGrath	Main role; 52 episodes
2004	Childstar	Chad	Film
2005	Cyber Seduction: His Secret Life	Guy in Locker Room	TV film
2006	Heartstopper	Walter	Film
2006	Dark Oracle	Emmett	9 episodes
2006	Naturally, Sadie	Jamie	2 episodes
2007	Twitches Too	Marcus WarBurton	TV film
2007	The Dresden Files	Dante Aureus	Episode: "Walls"
2007	Degrassi: The Next Generation	Griffin Pierce-Taylor	8 episodes
2008	Gotta Catch Santa Claus	Errol / Gabriel (voices)	TV film
2008	The Jon Dore Television Show	Environmental Fundraiser	Episode: "Jonathan-A-Thon"
2009	Pearlie	Jasper (voice)	12 episodes
2009	Skyrunners	Darryl Butler	TV film
2010	My Babysitter's a Vampire	Gord	TV film
2010	Aaron Stone	Connor	Episode: "Pack-Man"
2011	Nikita	Division Tech	Episode: "Free"
2012	Warehouse 13	Grad Student #2	Episode: "The Evil Within"
2012	Alphas	Bip	Episode: "Alphaville"
2012	BeyWheelz	Ken (voice)	2 episodes
2014	BeyWarriors: BeyRaiderz	Klaus (voice)	2 episodes
2025	Hearts Around the Table: Shari's Second Act	David	TV movie
