= Sadie's Last Days on Earth =

- Directed by: Michael Seater
- Written by: Lauren Collins; Michael Seater
- Produced by: Jessica Adams; Paula Brancati; Michael Seater
- Starring: Morgan Taylor Campbell; Lola Flanery; Clark Backo; Ricardo Hoyos; Munro Chambers; Paula Brancati
- Cinematography: Kristin Fieldhouse
- Edited by: Haya Waseem
- Music by: Anthony Brancati
- Production company: BrancSeater Productions
- Distributed by: A71 Entertainment; Shaftesbury Sales Company
- Release date: December 9, 2016
- Running time: 90 minutes
- Country: Canada
- Language: English

Sadie's Last Days on Earth is a 2016 Canadian comedy film directed by Michael Seater, and starring Morgan Taylor Campbell, Clark Backo, Ricardo Hoyos, Munro Chambers and Paula Brancati. The plot follows a teenager who is convinced that the end of the world is waxing and creates a survival and to-do list.

== Plot ==
Sadie Mitchell, a sixteen-year-old high school student is convinced the world is about to end, so she creates a list of skills she needs to master as a cook and another with personal interests like going to a party or kissing a guy. She does not want to be the only survivor and she really wants to get her best friend back before it's the end of the world.

== Cast ==
- Morgan Taylor Campbell as Sadie Mitchell
- Lola Flanery as Young Sadie Mitchell
- Clark Backo as Brennan
- Clarke Smith as Young Brennan
- Ricardo Hoyos as Jack Diaz
- Munro Chambers as Teddy
- Paula Brancati as Connie Nichol
- Hélène Joy as Hope Mitchell
- Peter Keleghan as Roger Mitchell
- George Stroumboulopoulos as Gord
- John Ralston as Burt
- Emilia McCarthy as Robin
- Madison Cheeatow as Dee

== Reception ==
=== Release ===
The film was released on December 9, 2016.

=== Critical response ===
Sadie's Last Days on Earth has received mixed reviews from critics, earning a score of 40% on review aggregator Rotten Tomatoes based on 5 reviews, with an average rating of 5.05/10.

=== Awards and nominations ===
Year	Award	Category	Nominee(s)	Result	Ref.
2017	Leo Awards	Best Performance Youth or Children's Program or Series	Morgan Taylor Campbell	Won	
