= Girlstuff/Boystuff =

- Genre: Children's television series Animated series
- Created by: Ruth Beni
- Developed by: Alan Silbering
- Directed by: Richard Burdett
- Voices of: Amos Crawley; Jonathan Malen; Bryn McAuley; Drew Nelson; Novie Edwards; Jackie Rosenbaum
- Composers: Chris Egan; Ian Hughes; Jono Grant
- Countries of origin: Canada; Hong Kong; United Kingdom
- Original language: English
- No. of seasons: 2
- No. of episodes: 39

Production
- Executive producers: Steven DeNure; Beth Stevenson; Alan Silbering; Neil Court
- Producers: Elana Adair; Steven Ching
- Running time: 30 minutes (12 minutes per segments)
- Production companies: Agogo Media; AE, Ltd. Decode Entertainment

Original release
- Network: YTV
- Release: 4 November 2002 – 6 February 2003

Girlstuff/Boystuff is an animated series for children created by Ruth Beni. In Canada, it aired on YTV. In the United States, it aired on Noggin during its nighttime block, The N.

== Overview ==
The show is about six teenage friends; three girls (Hanna, Reanne and Talia) and three boys (Jason, Ben and Simon), who talk about the differences between girls and boys, examining topics such as hobbies, food, music and fashion.

== Characters ==
- Hanna: She is the fashion queen in the group. She is spoiled and loves shopping. She is bossy in some way and is always trying to change others' fashion statement or style and tries to make it like her own.
- Reanne: She does her bit for the environment and is a free spirit. She loves animals and thinks everyone has a good side. She wants to save the earth by cleaning parks, volunteering in nature groups and gets her friends involved in some way.
- Talia: She is the youngest in the group, but her outfits make her look older. She has a say what you think/nervous demeanour. Her favourite things are filming and photography. She also has her own website.
- Jason: He is Talia's brother and not the only person who would refuse to try at all but in the end he wins. He loves music and is almost always wearing his headphones and portable CD player. He likes to keep with the flow and the latest cool stuff. He wants to become a DJ.
- Ben: Slightly obnoxious, Ben is most likely to have the latest "coolnest" but at the end of the day he is a good boy who cares about his friends. He is probably the second biggest show-off, behind Hanna.
- Simon: He is the smartest of the group and a computer whiz. He is kind of a nerd but his friends like to think of him as a cool, smart guy. He is very cautious.

== Cast and crew ==
The series was created by Ruth Beni of Animage Films UK.

- Drew Nelson – Jason (voice)
- Jonathan Malen – Ben (voice)
- Bryn McAuley – Hanna (voice)
- Novie Edwards – Reanne (voice)
- Jackie Rosenbaum – Talia (voice)
- Amos Crawley – Simon (voice)
- Steven DeNure – Executive Producer
- Neil Court – Executive Producer
- Beth Stevenson – Executive Producer
- Dan Fill – Producer
- Richard Switzer – Producer
- Jono Grant – Composer (Season 2)
- Seedpod – Theme song performer

== Television airing ==
The show was first premiered on YTV in Canada on 4 November 2002. In the United States, it aired on Noggin's teen block, The N. In Australia, it aired on ABC2's RollerCoaster block.

== Media release ==
The show was only ever released on VHS and DVD in Australia by ABC DVD. The complete series was also released onto YouTube by PorchLight Entertainment's KidMango in the United States.

== Episodes ==
=== Season 1 ===
1. "Games Peeps Play" / "Tents Situation"
2. "Secrets & Lies" / "Face Powder Blues"
3. "Tickets, Please" / "Mall's Fair"
4. "Birthday Party" / "The Art of You"
5. "Flu Manchu" / "Save Me"
6. "Lip Gloss Queen" / "Breaking Up is Hard to Do"
7. "Skaterchick" / "Blind Date"
8. "Party of the Year" / "Babysitting Miss Dot"
9. "Truth or Dare" / "Multiplex"
10. "The In Crowd" / "Gorilla My Dreams"
11. "Good Morning Rover" / "Un-Amusement Park"
12. "The Incredible Geeks" / "The Art of the Deal"
13. "Citizen Cane" / "Discount Fever"
14. "Bad Memories" / "Presently Surprised"
15. "Cha-Ching" / "Slam"
16. "Cram Session" / "Listen to the Music"
17. "The Making of..." / "The Afternoon Snack Club"
18. "The Young and the Foolish" / "Cause and Effects"
19. "Assess This" / "The Valentine Curse"
20. "The Perfect Match" / "Selling Out"
21. "Drama Queen" / "Mother's Day"
22. "The Lake" / "Klingon Someone Else"
23. "The Big Switch" / "Foreign Bodies"
24. "Stuff-a-Palooza" / "Video Return"
25. "Weekend Rental" / "Last Minute Shopping"
26. "Ghoulstuff/Boilstuff" / "Promises Promises"

=== Season 2 ===
1. "Style 911" / "Eleven Minute Workout"
2. "Health Class Horrors" / "Lights, Camera, Ahhhh!"
3. "Express Yourself" / "Casting Call"
4. "Return to Sneder" / "Medieval Mayhem"
5. "Track and Field Fiasco" / "Dot's Dilemma"
6. "Lust in Translation" / "Spring Break"
7. "Dirty Work" / "Trading Spaces"
8. "Clique Chic" / "Future Tense"
9. "If the Shoe Fits" / "Teacher's Pet"
10. "Bowling for Dollars and Dates" / "Adventures in Cousin-sitting
11. "Movin' On" / "Three Up, Three Down
12. "Date O Rama" / "Stuck"
13. "Monsters in Space" / "Bugged Out"
