= Pearlie =

Australian children's TV series (2009-2011)

- Genre: Comedy; Fantasy
- Created by: Wendy Harmer
- Written by: Wendy Harmer; Kim Thompson
- Directed by: Neil Affleck; Mike Zarb
- Voices of: Marieve Herington; Hélène Joy; Nathan Stephenson; Michelle Monteith; Jonathan Wilson; Fiona Reid; David Berni; Christian Potenza; Neil Crone; Stacey DePass
- Theme music composer: Louis Anton
- Opening theme: "Magic in the City", performed by Louise Anton
- Ending theme: "Magic in the City" (instrumental)
- Composer: Clive Harrison
- Countries of origin: Canada; Australia
- Original language: English
- No. of seasons: 1
- No. of episodes: 26 (52 segments)

Production
- Executive producers: Scott Dyer; Doug Murphy; Paul Robertson; Donna Andrews; Tim Brooke-Hunt
- Producers: Jennifer Hill; Merle-Anne Ridley; Rodney Whitham
- Running time: 22 minutes
- Production companies: Nelvana Limited; Sticky Pictures

Original release
- Network: YTV (Canada); Network Ten (Australia)
- Release: September 19, 2009 – January 31, 2011

Pearlie is a 2009 animated comedy television series based on the children's book series Pearlie the Park Fairy by Wendy Harmer. It is an Australian-Canadian co-production and aired on Network Ten in Australia and YTV in Canada from September 19, 2009. One season of 26 episodes was produced.

== Synopsis ==
Pearlie is a fairy appointed by Fairy Headquarters to keep Jubilee Park in the city in order. She is full of over-the-top plans for parties and events for the park and its residents, and as she puts it, "everything has to be perfect" for whatever it is she's planning. She is assisted by Jasper, an elf who is kind-hearted but prefers to not do any real work. There is also Opal, a fairy from Australia sent to learn the ropes of park management from Pearlie.

Pearlie's cousin Saphira is jealous of Pearlie's popularity in the fairy world and desperately wants her to be fired. With her assistant Ludwig, a common bat, Saphira sets out to spoil perky Pearlie's day any way she can. Pearlie remains oblivious, always thinking the best of her cousin, while Opal and Jasper are aware of Saphira's plans.

== Characters ==
=== Fairies ===
- Pearlie is a fairy who keeps Jubilee Park in sparkling order. Her eyes are green, she has freckles, and her hair is light blonde with light turquoise highlights. She is the titular protagonist of the series.
- Opal is an Australian Outback fairy sent to North America (possibly somewhere in Canada) by the Fairy Council to learn Advanced Park management. Opal does not use a wand, instead she has a magic lasso. Opal lives in a hollow log at the edge of the desert garden within the park.
- Saphira is Pearlie's vain, lazy, evil cousin and the main antagonist of the series. She calls herself the Queen of Darkness, as all she wears is sapphire blue and thinks she can overrule everyone else. In the books, her name is Sapphire.
- Great Aunt Garnet is Pearlie's well-meaning but absent minded great aunt. Garnet runs a store packed full of potions and lotions that always work, just not like they are supposed to. The store is inside a clock tower across the road from the park. Garnet is wise and patient who teaches Pearlie and Opal about potions. She used to be a Fairy Godmother until she retired.
- Fern is a wood nymph, with red/orange hair, who is Jasper's crush in the series. She also shares Jasper's love for nature, having a fascination in particular with birds. She is kind, open minded with zen-like patience, looks and acts a lot like a 1960s hippie and talks to animals in a chant, saying 'Love, Peace, Trees,' although she only actually does this in 'Trick In the Stick.' She appears in three episodes; 'Trick in the Stick', 'The Fern Turns' and 'Come Fly With Me.' Her wand is a twig.
- Laverne is a fairy dressed in pink and green with green wings on her back. She is a seasonal fairy in charge of Spring and her magic wand is spring-themed.
- Oriana is a plus sized and sweet summer fairy. She wears a skirted bathing suit and carries summer things.
- Leif is a fall fairy that has a crush on Pearlie who likes him back. Saphira has a crush on Leif too, though he does not like her back at all for her negative and snide attitude.
- Noel is the winter fairy with a white mustache. He wears winter clothes that are mostly blue.
- Coral is Pearlie's mother and Saphira's aunt. She is Agate's younger sister. Coral is exactly like Pearlie: fun, sweet, thoughtful, kind but much more mature than her daughter which is to be expected because she is an older fairy with much life experience.
- Agate is Pearlie's aunt, Saphira's mother and Coral's big sister. She is best friends with her younger sister Coral. Agate loves her daughter Saphira immensely but will not take any back sass or rudeness from her at all. She only appears in "Mother Magic".
- Twinkle-Twinkle is a vain fairy who is the best singing superstar in Jubilee Park. She does sing her songs. She sings, having a tape play the voice she once had.
- Astrid is a fairy with blue eyes and black hair. She works as the head of dream department wearing a black suit and skirt and carrying a red toolbox and an orange-redish ladybug phone. Her design is based on Pearlie creator Wendy Harmer.
- The Turquoise Fairy is a famous fairy author, of very few, but stern words. The Turquoise Fairy has turquoise eyes, hair and dress that match.
- Jingle is a Christmas fairy and is shown to be the smallest of the fairies. She is based on the Christmas Angel in the book series, made obvious when she flies to the top of the Christmas tree and poses as an angel.
- The Fairy Queen is inspired by Queen Elizabeth I. Her first name is Emerald.
- Finn is a tooth fairy that Pearlie and Saphira fall in love with.
- Prime Minister Puckle is the head of the Grand Fairy Federation, He is also very fond of taffy, "Prime Minister wants taffy". This character is a parody of Kevin Rudd.

=== Others ===
- Jasper is a garden elf with dreadlocks who likes to go barefoot while happily declaring himself "a barefoot toe wiggling elf". He has the ability to talk to plants.
- Sterling is a black-haired elf who is initially nice, but later on a sneaky criminal. He tricks Saphira and Lüdwig into going out of her place. He steals a magic spell-binding orb, only being seen twice and he has a fear of spiders.
- Lüdwig is Saphira's servant bat and sidekick.
- Johann is Lüdwig's twin brother bat and he wants Lüdwig to have the freedom that he wants.
- Gobsmack is the Regional Goblin Inspector and the representative of the headquarters in Jubilee Park.
- Gadzook is Gobsmack's boss and head goblin. He fires Gobsmack in one episode because he thought Pearlie had everything in the park under control and Gobsmack was not needed.
- Moe is a pixie with a black mustache and beard. His aliases are Monsieur Snip and Manuel. He is a criminal wanted for cutting the heads off flowers.
- Norville is a gnome that once filled in for Jasper while he was on a job swap. He appears in the episode "No Place Like Gnome".
- Sugar is a possum who plays the Bongo drums with Jasper and other possums. She married Brush in "Possumbillities".
- Scrag and Mr. Flea are "gangsta" rats who spend their days rooting in park garbage for treats. Though a pair of dirty and smelly nuisances, they are respectful towards Pearlie.
- Ned is Opal's pet from the outback, he is an orange frilled neck lizard. Lüdwig thought he was a dragon.
- Nancy is a centipede with a red body and a black Asian updo on her head. She works as Saphira's massager.
- Splish is a water nymph and Pearlie's neighbor for a week. She lives at the beach. She only appears in one episode.
- Whizzer is a dragonfly who delivers objects around Jubilee Park for Great Aunt Garnet. He wears a mailman's hat.
- Crash is a very tough teal-colored fat dragonfly with a pink heart in an arrow tattoo on his arm. His name comes from the fact that he has been involved in many dangerous crashes.
- Buggy Holly and the Crickets are a famous rock band who comes to Jubilee Park to put on a rock concert. They are seen in the episode "Bongo Boy" performing in Jubilee Park at a rock concert.

== Voice cast ==
- Marieve Herington - Pearlie
- Hélène Joy - Opal
- Nathan Stephenson - Jasper
- Michelle Monteith - Saphira
- Jonathan Wilson - Lüdwig
- Fiona Reid - Great Aunt Garnet
- David Berni - Gobsmack
- Christian Potenza - Scrag
- Neil Crone - Mr. Flea
- Stacey DePass - Fern
- Kathleen Laskey - Coral
- Bryn McAuley - Twinkle-Twinkle

== Episodes ==
Episode	Title	Summary 1	Summary 2	Production Code
1	Hurly Burly / Dude Ranch	A desert fairy called Opal moves to Jubilee Park and Pearlie and her elf buddy Jasper welcome her.	Jasper's tree home is sawn down, and so Pearlie must help him find a new home. Scrag and Mr. Flea then take advantage of the situation by making Jasper live in a sewer.	103
2	Mothballs / Snip & Snit	Opal is told to host the Full Moon Ball for moths, but Saphira's plans may spoil the celebration.	Gobsmack supposedly captures a criminal fairy called Moe and disguises him as a barber in Saphira's spa. When Pearlie, Jasper, and Opal visit the spa, they notice there is something odd going on.	101
3	Dial a Dilemma / Throwing Down	Opal believes a phone is a mystical being when one is dropped in Jubilee Park.	Pearlie talks Jasper into teaching her to throw her voice so she can be everywhere at once.	102
4	Tooth Affairy / Trick in the Stick	Pearlie fills in for a handsome male tooth fairy called Finn, but she realizes she has forgotten the most important rule of a tooth fairy.	Pearlie mixes up her wand with a wood nymph called Fern and transforms the park into a ravaging jungle. Eventually, the mix-up is now fixed at Saphira's spa.	104
5	If the Boot Fits / Peruvian Toadstool	Pearlie discovers that there is a boot thief in Jubilee Park, and Saphira blames Opal for the disappearing boots.	Jasper loses his memory after an encounter with a rare Peruvian toadstool.	105
6	White Shade of Pale / Flower Talk	A mistake with a magical snowglobe in Aunt Garnet's shop wreaks wintry havoc on Jubilee Park.	Pearlie uses an elf-only potion to talk to flowers so they can look good for a photograph shoot.	106
7	Dot Between the Eyes / Ratopia	On the eve of the Fairyland Flutter dance, Pearlie gets a nasty pimple. She then becomes partners with an ogre names Blair who everyone thinks is hideous.	Scrag and Mr. Flea cause a flood, which makes Pearlie evict them from Jubilee Park. However, they return with some cockroach friends to build a kingdom of trash called 'Ratopia.'	107
8	Dragonball Run / A Bitey Bitedown	There is a dragonfly race in Jubilee Park and Pearlie helps a small dragonfly gain confidence to win.	Pearlie tries to get rid of the rats' fleas. Soon, though, it turns into a war.	108
9	The Big Doll / Are You Being Served?	Pearlie and her friends find a doll in Jubilee Park and believe it is a being under a spell.	Saphira tries hard to kick Lüdwig out of her glass spa.	109
10	Ant Misbehavin' / Frilled Neck and Neck	Pearlie tries to teach some ants to relax from their work, which angers the Ant Queen and causes her to side with Saphira.	Opal's frilled lizard friend from the Outback, Ned, escapes and wreaks havoc in Jubilee Park.	110
11	Fairy-tastic Fall / The Fern Turns	Pearlie tries to keep everyone calm when the Fall Fairy does not arrive on time.	Fern the wood nymph returns to Jubilee Park in search of a rare and mysterious bird.	111
12	Dream On / No Place Like Gnome	A nightmare escapes in Jubilee Park and Pearlie must catch it.	Jasper changes jobs with a garden gnome.	112
13	Rat-Tanic / No Swimming Allowed	Scrag and Mr. Flea set up a cruise ship in an old watermelon, but when the melon gives way, their plans are spoiled.	One of Aunt Garnet's potions wreaks havoc at Pearlie's pool party.	113
14	Twinkle-Twinkle Diva Star / Secrets and Whispers	Pearlie welcomes star singer Twinkle-Twinkle to Jubilee Park until she reveals she is a fraud.	Pearlie plans a surprise party for Opal.	114
15	Hide and Go Eek / Dust Busters	Pearlie is turning Saphira's glass house into a haunted house for the Summertime Fairy Fair.	Pearlie spills the last of Garnet's fairy dust.	115
16	Roller Fairy / Fairy Factor	The park becomes a no-winged zone for flying creatures so Jasper makes roller skates for everyone.	Saphira is jealous of Pearlie's certificates, so she creates a housekeeping diploma.	116
17	Bongo Boy / Prickly Friends	Jasper accepts an offer to play the bongos in a fairy band, until he finds out it isn't what he thought it would be.	A cactus growing causes an argument between Jasper and Opal.	117
18	Fairy Godmother Bother / Go Go Gobsmack	Aunt Garnet's magic goes wildly wrong and turns the park into a fairytale land.	Gobsmack loses his job and needs to prove himself worthy to get it back.	118
19	Sterling Effort / Elf Prankin'	Pearlie is suspicious of Jasper's new friend.	Jasper is blamed for pranks all over Jubilee Park.	120
20	Spriteful / Love Bites	Pearlie's patience is tested with a new neighbor, a fun-loving water nymph who parties all night.	A love bug escapes to Jubilee Park and causes people to fall in love with each other.	121
21	Mother Magic / Buckin' Bronco	Pearlie's mother Coral visits Jubilee Park for a celebration.	Opal's star rodeo cockroach disappears.	122
22	Ludwig in the Wild / The Big Sneeze	When Ludwig goes missing, Pearlie searches for him.	Pearlie wants to help out with spring chores, but she has a cold.	123
23	Socks in the City / Possumbilities	Three fashionistas visit Jubilee Park, but then Pearlie reveals a fraud.	Pearlie's plans for a possum wedding are wrecked by a nervous groom.	125
24	Rose Petal Pearlie / Come Fly With Me	Pearlie and Saphira compete for the best rose petal muffins in Jubilee Park.	Jasper steals a child's airplane for a romantic ride with Fern, but Scrag and Mr. Flea try to spoil his plans.	119
25	Hideous Halloween / Super Sized Elf	Pearlie and her friends hide in a magical jack-o-lantern on Halloween Night.	Jasper meddles with magic and makes himself giant.	124
26	Jingle Bell Park / Starlight Spectacular	Pearlie welcomes Jingle, the new Christmas Fairy, to the park.	Pearlie's dream of performing for the Fairy Queen is scuttled.	126

== Home media ==
Australian media distributor Madman Entertainment released five DVDs of Pearlie in 2010.
