= People Hold On (film) =

- Theatrical release poster
- Directed by: Michael Seater
- Written by: Michael Seater
- Produced by: Michael Seater; Paula Brancati
- Cinematography: Theo Skudra
- Edited by: Haya Waseem
- Release dates: September 21, 2015 (Cinefest Sudbury); May 31, 2016 (iTunes)
- Running time: 97 minutes
- Country: Canada
- Language: English

People Hold On is a 2015 Canadian independent drama film written, directed, and produced by Michael Seater. The film features an ensemble cast that includes several young Canadian stars, including, among others, Katie Boland, Ashley Leggat, and Chloe Rose. Paula Brancati co-wrote the film with Seater, and also stars. The duo's production company, BrancSeater Productions, produced the film. It was filmed throughout 2014 and 2015 and debuted on the film festival circuit in 2015. It was released to general cinemas and for digital download on iTunes on May 31, 2016.

The film received a Canadian Screen Award nomination for Best Original Song, for the song "People Hold On", written and performed by cast member Noah Reid.

== Plot ==
A group of friends in their mid-twenties reunite for their annual trip to a cottage in the woods. Alycia, Robin, Freddy, and Matthew arrive first, and are shocked when Robin's ex-boyfriend Dan shows up with a 19-year old girlfriend named Marley. Two years ago, Dan proposed to Robin but she turned him down, and things have been rocky between them ever since. Last to arrive are Julia and her new fiancee Darren, and Alycia is immediately jealous of Julia's happiness and acts coldly towards her.

The eight settle in and begin making dinner. Robin attempts to befriend Marley, but is put off when she learns she and Dan have only been dating for two weeks. After eating, the group begin drinking and smoking mushrooms. Matthew showcases his musical talent by playing an original song, but brushes it off when Dan tries to encourage him to pursue a music career. When Marley falls asleep, Dan and Robin end up briefly making out in the kitchen before Robin stops and angrily storms off, while Alycia and Freddy make a campfire and eventually have sex. The next morning, Robin tells Alycia and Julia about her kiss with Dan, and while Alycia assumes that Dan brought Marley to make Robin jealous, Julia thinks Dan is just struggling over still having feelings for her. Meanwhile, Darren is shocked when he learns that Julia used to be a drug dealer in high school due to the "good girl" image she portrays now as an adult.

The group decide to spend the day at a nearby lake. Freddy tells the other guys about sleeping with Alycia, but when he tries to ask her on a real date she abruptly turns him down and runs off. While tanning with Robin and Julia, the other girls try to convince Alycia to give Freddy a chance. Julia admits that, although she's happy with Darren, she is frightened by the idea of only being with one person for the rest of her life, and Robin admits that is part of the reason why she broke up with Dan. However, Alycia rudely blows their advice off. Meanwhile, Dan condescendingly mocks Matthew about the fact that he quit his job to come on the trip, pissing Matthew off. Matthew later hangs out with Marley, who admits that she thinks Dan is preachy and acts like he is better than everyone else. Marley encourages Matthew to talk to Dan about how he treats him, but Matthew and Dan end up getting into a physical fight. Dan goes off into the woods with Marley and tries to initiate sex, but Marley stops him and tells him she isn't blind to the issues he has with his friends, and is upset he dragged her into it. They end up breaking up.

Darren begins letting loose and drinking with the others, and when Julia asks him advice about turning thirty, Darren says that turning thirty is when you realize that you're never really going to ever have it all together. Alycia runs over and begins gossiping about Marley and Matthew flirting, leading to her comparing Marley to Julia. The others reveal that Julia has had sex with all the guys in their friend group, despite how uncomfortable the revelation makes Darren. When Alycia makes a cruel comment about Julia giving everyone STD's, Julia overhears and angrily calls Alycia out on being rude to her all weekend, telling her that everything bad about Alycia's life is her own fault. Alycia is reduced to tears, and the group awkwardly returns to the cabin. Matthew comforts Julia, and admits he has realized he needs to grow up. He goes for a walk and finds Marley sitting alone, and they share a kiss. Darren finds Julia and assures her that he doesn't care about her past actions, and only wants her to not pretend to be someone she isn't for him. They happily reconcile.

Later, Julia, Darren, Alycia, Freddy, Dan, and Robin eat dinner in awkward silence. Matthew and Marley never show up to eat, and although Julia is concerned, the others tell her not to worry. Julia and Darren reveal they are going to pack and go home early, but Julia promises to give Robin a hug goodbye before she leaves. Alycia breaks down and admits to Robin that she is sorry for how she treated Julia but is insecure over the fact that Julia's life is going great while she feels like her life is going nowhere. Robin comforts her and tells her to stop comparing herself to other people and to stop being afraid to do what she wants. Alycia agrees, and she goes to Freddy and apologizes for turning him down and asks him out. In return, Freddy asks Alycia to try to work on how she treats people, and they kiss before Alycia goes to find Julia and Darren to apologize to them.

Freddy finds Dan and Robin drinking together outside, and the three spend several hours hanging out and enjoying each other's company. When they return to the cabin, Robin discovers that Julia, Darren, and Alycia are nowhere to be found, even though their bags are still in their rooms and their cars are still parked outside. Realizing that none of them have seen Marley or Matthew since they got back from the lake, Robin grows frantic and scared that something has happened to their missing friends. Freddy decides to leave and check if everyone is at the guest cabin where Julia and Darren were staying, promising that he will return in five minutes. However, he does not come back at all, leaving Robin and Dan alone.

Robin and Dan begin fighting over what to do, and the fight transforms into a fight about their failed relationship. Robin accuses Dan that he only proposed to her to try and magically fix the problems they had, but Dan tells her that he asked her to marry him because, despite their issues, she was the only person he wanted to be with. Robin confesses that she still loves him, and both admit that being apart for the last two years has been unbearable, rekindling their relationship. They decide to leave the cabin and search for their friends despite how scared they are, and the film ends as they go outside and shut the cabin door behind them, with Robin asking Dan "Now what?"

== Cast ==
- Katie Boland as Alycia
- Paula Brancati as Robin
- Mazin Elsadig as Darren
- Ashley Leggat as Julia
- Jonathan Malen as Freddy
- Al Mukadam as Dan
- Noah Reid as Matthew
- Chloe Rose as Marley

== Release ==
The film premiered at the Cinefest Sudbury International Film Festival in 2015. Upon release, it received mixed reviews from film critics.
