= Radio Free Roscoe =

Television series or program

- Genre: Teen drama Comedy drama
- Created by: Will McRobb; Douglas McRobb
- Starring: Nathan Carter; Ali Mukaddam; Nathan Stephenson; Kate Todd
- Theme music composer: Jono Grant
- Opening theme: "Radio Free Roscoe Theme"
- Ending theme: "Radio Free Roscoe Theme" (Instrumental) (some episodes)
- Composer: Jono Grant
- Countries of origin: Canada; United States
- Original language: English
- No. of seasons: 4 (Note: The 52 episodes were aired as two seasons in Canada but as four seasons in the United States)
- No. of episodes: 52 (list of episodes)

Production
- Executive producers: Steven DeNure; Neil Court; Beth Stevenson; Will McRobb (S1, S3–4); Douglas McRobb
- Producer: John A. Delmage
- Production locations: Toronto, Ontario; Nutley, New Jersey (pilot)
- Cinematography: George Hosek
- Editors: Richard Wells (S1); Mark Sanders (S2–3); Richard Wells (S4)
- Running time: 20–22 minutes
- Production company: Decode Entertainment (Note: As DECODE/Nutley Productions Inc. (Series 1) or DECODE/Roscoe Productions 2 Inc. (Series 2))

Original release
- Network: Family Channel (Canada); Noggin (The N block; U.S.)
- Release: August 1, 2003 – May 25, 2005

Radio Free Roscoe is a teen comedy-drama television series created by Will McRobb and Douglas McRobb. The series follows four high school students in the fictional town of Roscoe who start an underground pirate radio station to challenge their school's conformist culture. It starred Nathan Carter, Ali Mukaddam, Nathan Stephenson, and Kate Todd.

Produced by Decode Entertainment and filmed in Toronto, the series premiered on Family Channel on August 1, 2003. It also aired on Noggin's teen block The N in the United States, which co-funded the second season. The series ran for 52 episodes over four seasons, ending on May 27, 2005. Radio Free Roscoe won the Gemini Award for Best Children's or Youth Fiction Program in 2005.

== Premise ==
Four teens in the fictional town of Roscoe start attending Henry Roscoe High School. Fed up with their school's official radio station (Cougar Radio) dictating how students should live, and the overbearing Principal Waller who favors the popular students, they create their own pirate radio station called Radio Free Roscoe. Lily Randall, Ray Brennan, and Robbie McGrath are old friends who find a new ally in Travis Strong when they form the station. They assume radio aliases to conceal their identities from the school administration.

== Development ==
The series was originally conceived as Radio Free Nutley, with a pilot filmed in Nutley, New Jersey featuring an entirely different cast. When the pilot was not picked up, Decode Entertainment moved production to Toronto and recast the show.

== Broadcast history ==
Radio Free Roscoe premiered on Family Channel in Canada on August 1, 2003. In the United States, the series aired on Noggin's teen block The N. The series ran for 52 episodes over four seasons, concluding in 2005. Reruns aired on The N and its successor TeenNick until September 8, 2013.

== Cast and characters ==
=== Main ===
Each main character uses a pseudonym while broadcasting to remain anonymous and prevent the administration from shutting down the station.

- Al Mukadam – Ray Brennan / "Pronto"
- Nathan Stephenson – Robbie McGrath / "Question Mark"
- Kate Todd – Lily Randall / "Shady Lane"
- Nathan Carter – Travis Strong / "Smog"

=== Supporting ===
- Genelle Williams – Kim Carlisle
- Hamish McEwan – Principal Daniel Waller
- Kenny Robinson – Mickey Stone
- Ashley Newbrough – Audrey Quinlan
- David Rendall – Ted
- Garen Boyajian – Ed
- Victoria Nestorowicz – Parker Haynes (season 3–4)
- Hill Kourkoutis – Megan (season 3–4)
- Lara Amersey – Bridget (season 3–4)
- Steve Belford – River Pierce (season 3–4)
- Julia Alexander – Grace Sutter (season 3–4)

=== Guest stars ===
- Maggie Gelbert – Marley (Marlee) Otto
- Tracey Hoyt – Miss Emily Mitchell
- Ray Mukaddam – Tim Brennan
- Lauren Collins – Blaire
- Paula Brancati – Veronica
- Skye Sweetnam – Sydney DeLuca
- Jake Epstein – Jackson Torrence
- William Greenblatt – Leon Appleton
- Sara Farb – Jennifer Peoples
- Aubrey Graham – RFR caller
- The Meligrove Band – Themselves
- The Trews – Themselves
- The Pettit Project – Themselves
- The Rocket Summer – Himself (voice)
- Dan Koch – Himself (voice)
- Mukundan Jr. – Himself

== Episodes ==
The series consists of 52 episodes. On Family Channel, the episodes aired as two seasons; on The N, they aired as four seasons.

== Media releases ==
- Radio Free Roscoe: Season One - Greatest Hits – DVD compilation, VSC Corporation (Video Services Corp.)
- Radio Free Roscoe, Volume 1 – CD compilation

== Awards and nominations ==
Year	Award	Category	Result
2004	New York Festivals	Television Programming & Promotion – Teen Programs (ages 13–17)	Won (Silver World Medal)
2004	Gemini Awards	Best Children's or Youth Fiction Program or Series	Nominated
2004	Young Artist Awards	Best Performance in a Television Series, Recurring Young Actor (David Rendall)	Nominated
2004	Parents' Choice Awards	Recommended Television Series	Won
2004	Gemini Awards	Best Performance in a Children's or Youth Program or Series (Ali Mukaddam)	Nominated
2004	Gemini Awards	Best Sound in a Dramatic Series	Nominated
2004	Gemini Awards	Best Children's or Youth Fiction Program or Series	Nominated
2005	Gemini Awards	Best Children's or Youth Fiction Program or Series	Won

== International broadcast ==
Country/Region	Channel	Language
Australia	ABC (now moved to ABC2)	English
Russia	Teen TV	Russian
Italy	Rai Gulp and Rai 2	Italian
Canada	BBC Kids; Family Channel (defunct); WildBrainTV (defunct)	English
Canada	VRAK.TV	French
Portugal	Panda Biggs	European Portuguese
Latin America	Boomerang	Latin American Spanish
Brazil	Boomerang	Brazilian Portuguese
Poland	ZigZap; TVP2	Polish
United Kingdom	Nickelodeon	English
United States	The N (block on Noggin)	English
France	France 2 and Canal J	French
Finland	YLE TV2	English (with Finnish subtitles)
Israel	Arutz HaYeladim	English (with Hebrew subtitles)
