= I Was a Sixth Grade Alien! =

British-Canadian children's TV show (1999–2001)

- Also known as: My Best Friend Is an Alien!
- Genre: Science fiction comedy
- Created by: Daphne Ballon; Sheri Elwood
- Developed by: Ellis Iddon; Phil Meagher
- Starring: Daniel Clark; Panou; Shadia Simmons; Ryan Cooley; Lauren Collins; Michael Cera; Kyle Schmid; Julian Richings; C. David Johnson; Ali Mukaddam
- Countries of origin: Canada; United Kingdom
- Original language: English
- No. of seasons: 2
- No. of episodes: 44

Production
- Production companies: Winklemania Productions; AAC Kids; TV-Loonland AG (Season 2)

Original release
- Network: YTV
- Release: July 13, 1999 – January 10, 2001

I Was a Sixth Grade Alien! (known as My Best Friend is an Alien! in the UK and Australia) is a children's science fiction comedy television series based on Bruce Coville's book series of the same name. It follows the chronicles of Pleskit, a purple-skinned, blue-haired extraterrestrial being with an antenna positioned on his head. He tries to fit in and make some friends, but due to his strange appearance, he never really succeeds. He does make one friend, Tim, who is interested in space and aliens. The two friends go through the sixth grade together. During the series, they solve many unusual problems, from a trans-universal portal game to a blue-coloured, wailing pig creature from Pleskit's home planet. The show premiered on July 13, 1999, ended on January 10, 2001, and was produced by UK-based Winklemania Productions and Canadian-based Alliance Atlantis Communications' children's unit, AAC Kids with the participation of the Canadian Television Fund/Fonds canadien de télévision, the Canadian Film Or Video Production Tax Credit, and the Shaw Television Broadcast Fund/Fonds de télédiffusion Shaw. German children's company TV-Loonland AG joined production for the show's second season after entering into a distribution deal with Alliance Atlantis. In the U.S., it aired on Fox Family (now as Freeform).

== Episode listing ==
The series consists of 44 episodes.

=== Season 1 (1999–2000) ===
No. overall	No. in season	Title	Directed by	Written by	Original release date
1	1	"They Called Him Pleskit!"	Carl Goldstein	Sheri Elwood	July 13, 1999
2	2	"Aliens to Blow Up Earth!"	Alex Chapple	Edgar Lyall	July 18, 1999
3	3	"Alien Dinner Massacre!"	Alex Chapple	John Slama	July 20, 1999
4	4	"They Saved Grandpa's Brain!"	Otta Hanus	Derek Schreyer	July 27, 1999
5	5	"They Shoot, They Splorked!"	Ron Murphy	Steve Westren	August 3, 1999
6	6	"I Was Dealt a Dung Deal!"	Craig Pryce	Noel Baker	August 10, 1999
7	7	"Sixth Grade Rebellion Mayhem!"	Michael DeCarlo	Jackie May	August 17, 1999
8	8	"Pre-Teen Party from Outer Space!"	Michael DeCarlo	Derek Schreyer	August 24, 1999
9	9	"The Haunting of Blim Blomkins!"	Bill Fleming	Cameron Rothery	August 31, 1999
10	10	"Alien Time Warp Madness!"	Otta Hanus	Craig Rintoul	September 7, 1999
11	11	"Alien Dustbuster Bedlam!"	Craig Pryce	Story by : Edgar Lyall; Teleplay by : John Slama	September 14, 1999
12	12	"My Bodyguard Is a Rat Fink!"	Ron Murphy	Sheri Elwood	September 21, 1999
13	13	"Woodlander Bodysnatcher Pandemonium!"	Carl Harvey	Derek Schreyer	September 28, 1999
14	14	"Floormat from the Putrid Lagoon!"	Reid Dunlop	Sheri Elwood	October 5, 1999
15	15	"Invasion of the Substitute Teacher Superfiend!"	Carl Goldstein	Craig Rintoul	October 11, 1999
16	16	"Alien Snogorama Snafu!"	Don McBrearty	Daphne Ballon	October 13, 1999
17	17	"Alien Appliance Outbreak!"	Carl Goldstein	Daphne Ballon & Derek Schreyer	November 7, 1999
18	18	"Gro-Gro-Grown-Up Dementia!"	Ron Murphy	Derek Schreyer	November 14, 1999
19	19	"The Return of Captain Driscoll!"	Craig Pryce	Alex Pugsley	November 16, 1999
20	20	"School Dance Gone Wrong!"	Carl Goldstein	Story by : Michael McCowan; Teleplay by : Skander Halim	November 17, 1999
21	21	"Escape from Planet Earth!"	Paul Fox	Sheri Elwood	November 21, 1999
22	22	"Attack of the 1000 Foot Veeblax!"	Carl Goldstein	John Slama	March 9, 2000

=== Season 2 (2000–2001) ===
No. overall	No. in season	Title	Directed by	Written by	Original release date
23	1	"There's an Alien in My Seat!"	TBA	TBA	TBA
24	2	"I Am Larrabe Hicks!"	TBA	TBA	TBA
25	3	"Hevi Hevi Beat Crazy!"	TBA	TBA	TBA
26	4	"Once Upon a Robot!"	TBA	TBA	TBA
27	5	"Alien Tracker Freak-a-Mania!"	TBA	TBA	TBA
28	6	"The Pleskit Club!"	TBA	TBA	TBA
29	7	"Bride of Pleskit!"	TBA	TBA	TBA
30	8	"The Revenge of Septic Willy!"	TBA	TBA	TBA
31	9	"Alien Quiz Show!"	TBA	TBA	TBA
32	10	"Escape from Zartopia!"	TBA	TBA	TBA
33	11	"McNally the Menace!"	TBA	TBA	TBA
34	12	"Dr. Pleskit and Mr. Ventraa!"	TBA	TBA	TBA
35	13	"Super-Fiend Strikes Back!"	TBA	TBA	TBA
36	14	"Great Coville Galaxies!"	TBA	TBA	TBA
37	15	"A Very Buttsman Christmas"	TBA	TBA	TBA
38	16	"Truth-O-Rama Crunchdown!"	TBA	TBA	TBA
39	17	"His Girlfriend Is an Alien!"	TBA	TBA	TBA
40	18	"To See the Invisible Geek!"	TBA	TBA	TBA
41	19	"Help! I Pooverized My Mother!"	TBA	TBA	TBA
42	20	"Alien Body Switching Bonanza"	TBA	TBA	TBA
43	21	"CAMputer Meltdown Mayhem!"	TBA	TBA	TBA
44	22	"Earthside Story"	TBA	TBA	TBA
