= Roy MacGregor =

Canadian writer

Roy MacGregor OC (born 1948) is a Canadian author of fiction and non-fiction.

== Career ==
RoyMacGregor talks about Northern Light on Bookbits radio

Roy MacGregor was born in Whitney, Ontario, in 1948 and grew up in Huntsville, Ontario. He graduated with a Bachelor of Arts in political science from Laurentian University and a graduate diploma in journalism from the University of Western Ontario in 1972. His work tends to focus on Canadian topics; Shelagh Rogers has dubbed him the "heir to Peter Gzowski". He has a longstanding interest in the life of Tom Thomson, and has written both a novel and a biography exploring the artist's life and mysterious death.

MacGregor has also been called "the Wayne Gretzky of hockey writing" and the Washington Post once declared him to be "the closest thing there is to a poet laureate of Canadian hockey." In 2012, he was awarded the Elmer Ferguson Memorial Award by the Professional Hockey Writers' Association and named the media honouree to the Hockey Hall of Fame. In 2015 he was named to the Ontario Sports Hall of Fame as winner of the Brian Williams Media Award. He is also a member of the Huntsville Sports Hall of Fame, Huntsville being the small town where he played competitive hockey, lacrosse and baseball. In 1960, he played - as a second- and third-liner - on the Huntsville team that won the all-Ontario Pee Wee 'A' lacrosse championship.

He is the winner of multiple awards for his writing, including the prestigious Rutstrum Award, which is given out every five years to the best book on wilderness writing in North America. MacGregor won in 2001 for his memoir on his father, A Life in the Bush. MacGregor is a multiple winner of National Magazine Awards, National Newspaper Awards and twice was awarded the ACTRA Award as Canada's top television dramatist, including for the 1978 film Tyler. He has received honorary degrees from Laurentian University, Trent University and Loyalist College.

In 2005, Roy MacGregor was named an Officer in the Order of Canada. In 2012, he was awarded The Queen Elizabeth II Diamond Jubilee Medal. He and Ellen, an artist, live in Kanata, Ontario, and have four grown children and five grandchildren.

== Bibliography ==
- The Screech Owls Mystery Series for young readers. 29 volumes, 1995-2015.
- Home Game: Hockey and Life in Canada. Co-author with Ken Dryden, McClelland & Stewart, 1989.
- Chief: The Fearless Vision of Billy Diamond. Viking/Penguin, Canada, 1989.
- Quantity Time: Words of Comfort for Imperfect Parents. McClelland & Stewart, Canada, 1990.
- The Road Home: Images of the Ottawa Valley. Photography by Steve Evans. General Store Publishing House, Canada, 1992.
- Road Games: A Year in the Life of the NHL. Macfarlane, Walter & Ross, Canada, 1993.
- The Home Team: Fathers, Sons & Hockey. Viking/Penguin, Canada, 1995.
- Valley Christmas. GenerTal Store Publishing House, Canada, 1996.
- The Seven A.M. Practice. McClelland & Stewart, Canada, 1996.
- A Life in the Bush: Lessons from my father. Viking/Penguin, Canada, 1999.
- A Loonie for Luck: A True Fable about Hockey and the Olympics. McClelland & Stewart, Canada, 2002.
- Escape: In Search of the Natural Soul of Canada, McClelland & Stewart, Canada, 2002.
- Canoe Lake. Novel, originally published as Shorelines, McClelland & Stewart, Canada, 2002.
- The Weekender: A Cottage Journal. Penguin Books Canada, 2005.
- The Dog and I: Confessions of a Best Friend. Penguin Books Canada, 2006.
- Canadians: A Portrait of a Country and Its People. Viking/Penguin, Canada, 2007.
- Northern Light: The Enduring Mystery of Tom Thomson and the Woman Who Loved Him. Random House, Canada, 2010
- Wayne Gretzky's Ghost: And Other Tales from a Lifetime in Hockey. Random House, Canada, 2011.
- Canoe Country: The Making of Canada. Random House, Canada, 2015.
- Original Highways: Travelling the Great Rivers of Canada, Random House Canada, 2017, winner of Ottawa Book Award 2018.
- The Ice Chips and the Magical Rink, with Kerry MacGregor, Illustrated by Kim Smith, Harper Collins, 2018.
- The Ice Chips and the Haunted Hurricane, with Kerry MacGregor, Illustrated by Kim Smith, Harper Collins, 2018.
- Paper Trails: From the Backwoods to the Front Page : A Life in Stories. Toronto: Random House Canada. ISBN 978-1-0390-0073-5.
