= Jonathan Malen =

Canadian actor

- Occupation: Actor
- Years active: 1999–present
- Spouse: Lauren Collins (m. 2018)
- Children: 2

Jonathan Malen is a Canadian actor, best known for providing the voice for Jimmy Z in Wild Kratts.

== Personal life ==
Jonathan Malen and actress Lauren Collins became engaged on August 29, 2017. They were married in October 2018. They welcomed their first child, Charlie Sebastian Malen, on March 6, 2020. Their second son, Leo Wilder Malen, was born on April 27, 2023.

== Filmography ==
=== Film ===
Year	Title	Role	Notes
2004	Mean Girls	Kristen's Boyfriend	
2005	The River King	Nathaniel Gibb	
2006	Take the Lead	Kurd	
2007	Charlie Bartlett	Jordan Sunder	
2008	The Rocker	Jeremy	
2012	House at the End of the Street	Ray	
2014	Perfect Sisters	David	
2015	People Hold On	Freddy	
2017	Cardinals	Greg	

=== Television ===
Year	Title	Role	Notes
2000	Possessed	Robbie Mannheim	Television film
2000–2002	Screech Owls	Nish	Main role
2003–2005	The Blobheads	Billy Barnes	Main role
2004–2006	Dark Oracle	Dizzy	Main role
2010	Republic of Doyle	Dwayne	3 episodes
2013	Beauty & the Beast	IT Hipster	Episode: "Never Turn Back"
2017	The Mist	Ted	4 episodes
2017	The Strain	Jeremy	Episode: "The Blood Tax"
2018	The Handmaid's Tale	Quinn	Episode: "June"
2019	American Gods	Chuck	Episode: "#2.4"
2019	Good Witch	Dr. Josh Harkins	Episode: "The Tea"
2019	Hudson & Rex	Miles Chaffey	Episode: "Game of Bones"
2020	Murdoch Mysteries	Philipe MacAuley	Episode: "The Future is Unwritten"
2020	The Umbrella Academy	Ned	Episode: "Öga for Öga"
2022	Ruby and the Well	Freddie	Episode: "I Wish I Could Get It Back"
2023	Pretty Hard Cases	Jake Mardy	6 episodes
2023	Essex County	Deke Wallis	Season 1, episode 2
2023	The Heiress of Christmas	Kevin	TV film
2025	The Copenhagen Test	Young Victor	Episode: "Looking Glass"

=== Animation ===
Year	Title	Role	Notes
2002–2003	Girlstuff/Boystuff	Ben	Main role
2011–present	Wild Kratts	Jimmy Z	Main role
2018–present	Paw Patrol	Danny	Recurring role

=== Video games ===
Year	Title	Role	Notes
2001	Devil May Cry	Young Dante and Vergil	Main and supporting roles; Voice
