= Paula Brancati =

Canadian actress (born 1989)

- Born: June 6, 1989 (age 37); Thornhill, Ontario, Canada
- Occupations: Actress, producer, director
- Years active: 1999–present

Paula Brancati (born June 6, 1989) is a Canadian actress, producer, and director. She is best known for her roles on Degrassi: The Next Generation, Being Erica, and the horror anthology series Slasher. She is also the co-founder of BrancSeater Productions, through which she develops Canadian independent films and television projects.

== Early life ==
Brancati was born in Thornhill, Ontario, Canada. She attended the regional arts program at St. Elizabeth Catholic High School and studied with the CharActors Theatre Troupe. She is of Italian descent.

== Career ==
Brancati began acting at a young age and “got her first taste” of film while working on a commercial, which sparked her passion for performing. As a child actor, she appeared in television series such as Doc, Radio Free Roscoe, and Dark Oracle—for which she earned a Gemini Award nomination.

She gained national recognition for portraying Jane Vaughn on Degrassi: The Next Generation, a role that made her one of the show’s most prominent cast members. She later starred as Jenny Zalen on the CBC comedy-drama Being Erica and as multiple characters in Netflix’s horror anthology Slasher.

Brancati co-founded BrancSeater Productions, through which she has written, produced, and starred in several independent Canadian films. Her company’s debut feature, People Hold On, premiered at the Cinefest Sudbury International Film Festival and was later distributed by Mongrel Media.

She continues to appear on screen while producing projects that highlight contemporary Canadian stories. In 2022, she directed the short film Junior's Giant, and in 2025 she stars in Hell Motel for Shudder.

Brancati is also recognized for her theatre work, including her 2016 portrayal of Miss Honey in Toronto’s production of Matilda the Musical.

Beyond acting, she is a vocal advocate for Canadian arts education and has supported initiatives encouraging young people to pursue creative careers.

== Filmography ==
=== Film ===
Year	Title	Role	Notes
2003	Cold Creek Manor	Stephanie Pinski	
2006	Cow Belles	Sarah	
2011	Moon Point	Kristin	
2013	Out	Karen	Short film
2015	People Hold On	Robin	Also producer
2016	Nobody’s Home	Eden (voice)	
2016	Onto Us	Alana	Short film
2016	Sadie's Last Days on Earth	Connie Nichol	
2018	Edging	Rachael	
2019	Majic	Bernwood	
2019	From the Vine	Laura Gentile	
TBA	John and Annie	Annie	Short film, completed

=== Television ===
Year	Title	Role	Notes
1999	Ricky’s Room	Tara	
2003	Radio Free Roscoe	Veronica	2 episodes
2004–2006	Dark Oracle	Cally Stone / Violet	Main role; Gemini Award nominee
2007–2010	Degrassi: The Next Generation	Jane Vaughn	Main role
2009–2011	Being Erica	Jenny Zalen	Main role
2016–2025	Slasher	Various roles	Recurring roles across seasons
2025	Hell Motel	Paige	Main role
2026	Doc	Lily	1 episode

=== Music videos ===
Year	Title	Artist
2018	"I'm Upset"	Drake
