= The Zack Files =

- Based on: The Zack Files by Dan Greenburg
- Developed by: Kathy Slevin
- Starring: Robert Clark; Jake Epstein; Michael Seater; Katie Boland; Noah Giffin; Jeff Clarke
- Country of origin: Canada
- No. of seasons: 2
- No. of episodes: 52

Production
- Running time: 22 minutes
- Production company: Decode Entertainment

Original release
- Network: YTV
- Release: September 17, 2000 – May 5, 2002

The Zack Files is a Canadian science fiction television program based on a book series of the same name, written by Dan Greenburg. It first aired on YTV from September 17, 2000, until the final episode aired in May 5, 2002. This series was shot in Toronto, Ontario.

== Plot ==
The series revolves around a teenage boy, played by Robert Clark, who is a magnet for paranormal activity and attends Horace Hyde-White High School for Boys along with his three friends Cam, Gwen, and Spencer. Zack manages to get himself into trouble with his paranormal adventures and it is up to his friends to help him set things straight.

== Characters ==
- Zachary "Zack" Greenburg (played by Robert Clark) is the main protagonist. A relatively normal kid but often becomes a magnet for the paranormal.
- Cameron "Cam" Dunleavey (played by Jake Epstein) is one of Zack's best friends who will do anything to make a quick buck. He is a flirtatious womaniser, but is in love with Gwen.
- Spencer "Spence" Sharpe (played by Michael Seater) is another of Zack's best friends and the keeper of The Zack Files who is infatuated with paranormal activity and is attempting to win the Nobel Prize by proving the paranormal exists.
- Gwendolyn "Gwen" Killerby (played by Katie Boland): Gwen doesn't believe in paranormal activity and her father is headmaster of their school, which allows her to be the only girl at an all-boys academy.
- Vernon Mantueffel (played by Noah Giffin) is the school snob. He is jealous of Cam, Spence and Zack. He is Zack's nemesis, the richest kid in school and he also sweats a lot. He often recruits the dimwitted Brooks twins, Tad and Todd (Ryan and Brett Moon) as his lackeys.
- Daniel "Dan" Greenburg (played by Jeff Clarke) is Zack's father, divorced and kind of ignorant.
- Jennifer "Woman From 302" (played by Collette Micks): Downstairs neighbour and sometimes girlfriend of Zack's father.

== Telecast and home media ==
In the U.S., it aired on Fox Family (now known as Freeform) and Showtime Family Zone.

In August 2004, Goldhill Home Media released the first season on DVD.

== Episodes ==
=== Season 1 (2000–01) ===
No. overall	No. in season	Title	Directed by	Written by	Original release date	Prod. code
1	1	"The Library of No Return"	E.J.Thompson	Kathy Slevin	September 17, 2000	1.01
Zack forgets to return Alice in Wonderland which is the book that just got a missing torn page and the characters in it come to life. Spencer and Cam must become Zack's lawyers and find proof to exonerate him and identify the real thief: Vernon.
2	2	"You Don't Say"	William Fruet	James Nadler	September 18, 2000	1.02
When Principal Killerby starts his career at Zack's school, he meets his daughter Gwen. Meanwhile, when Zack picks up a book on ventriloquism at a magic shop and learns to throw his voice, his voice escapes from his body.
3	3	"It's a Wonderful School"	Michael DeCarlo	Kathy Slevin	September 25, 2000	1.03
Zack loses the class president election and is so angry that he breaks the voting machine which sends him to an alternate future in which he is a TV junkie while Vernon is now the headmaster.
4	4	"Quiet Please, I'm Reading Your Mind"	John Bell	Kathy Slevin	October 2, 2000	1.04
An incident causes Zack to read other's minds.
5	5	"Sock World"	William Fruet	James Nadler	October 9, 2000	1.05
Zack finds himself in a world which is dominated by socks while trying to obtain a sock which reminds him of the time when his parents were together.
6	6	"Total Rewind"	Michael DeCarlo	Kathy Slevin	October 16, 2000	1.06
Dan buys a Digital Video Recorder from Vernon's father but the machine has aliens who want a human specimen: Vernon.
7	7	"Loose Lips: A Dog's Story"	John Bell	Steven Westren	October 23, 2000	1.07
Zack discovers he can talk with dogs if they're in a moving vehicle.
8	8	"Crypt Seeker"	Ross Clyde	Chris Dickie	October 30, 2000	1.08
It's video game week and Zack buys a new game that is called Crypt Seeker. While playing, he causes Tara Bond to arrive in the real world while Spencer ends up in the game world. Zack and Cam must find a way to send Tara back and deliver their friend before Tara can seduce Dan.
9	9	"Misfortune Cookie"	John Bell	James Nadler	November 13, 2000	1.09
Fortune cookies can sometimes give the wrong prediction. That's what Zack learns when he discovers that all his wishes will be granted. Gwen faints while waiting for her idol and Zack, Spencer and Cam end up in a car's cemetery.
10	10	"Run Zack Run"	Ron Oliver	Kathy Slevin	November 20, 2000	1.10
When Zack buys magic shoes, he can't stop running.
11	11	"Deja Vudoo"	William Fruet	Kathy Slevin	November 27, 2000	1.11
When Gwen celebrates her birthday, Zack immediately falls in love with a girl named Rita and tries to seduce her but fails. While manipulating Spencer's camera, he discovers he can use it to go back in time at will. He is naturally the only one to notice it.
12	12	"But I'm Too Young to Be My Dad"	Ross Clyde	Kathy Slevin	January 15, 2001	1.12
Zack receives a visit from his future son (played by Daniel Clark who is Robert's older brother in real life). Absent: Vernon
13	13	"Photo Double"	Craig Pryce	Steven Westren	January 8, 2001	1.13
When Zack gets his class photo taken, his soul gets stuck in the photo, leaving him in a zombie state.
14	14	"One Bad Seed"	Ron Oliver	Sheila Presscott Vessey	December 4, 2000	1.14
When Zack complains about his height, he accidentally swallows an orange seed and becomes taller.
15	15	"Fiber!"	Gail Harvey	Katayoun A Marciano	January 1, 2001	1.15
When Dan insists that Zack should only eat sane food, he buys old cereals with expiration dates that are the day after. Zack eats it and becomes older and older. His friends have to help him and reverse the process before Zack turns into dust.
16	16	"Anchovy of Doom"	Craig Pryce	Kathy Slevin	January 22, 2001	1.16
Zack, while working on a scientific project, microwaves an anchovy pizza. He discovers he has the power to shrink kids (Gwen, Dickie, Tad, Todd and Vernon) and to put them in a terrarium.
17	17	"Exit, Stage Fright"	John Bell	Steven Westren	January 29, 2001	1.17
Zack and his friends lose their pants while trying to vanquish their stage fright.
18	18	"Talented Mr. Talisman"	William Fruet	Chris Dickie	February 5, 2001	1.18
After borrowing Gwen's luck, Dan becomes extremely lucky while Gwen receives all the bad luck.
19	19	"This Is Your Conscience Calling"	John Bell	Kathy Slevin	February 19, 2001	1.20
Zack receives phone calls from his conscience after he forgets his promise to spend less money.
20	20	"The Switch"	Harvey Crossland	Peter Colley	February 26, 2001	1.21
Zack accidentally switches place with Vernon and begins to enjoy a great life while Vernon must confront ordinary life. After that, Charles (Vernon's butler) intervenes which causes Vernon to get his body back and Charles to switch his with Zack.
21	21	"The Bottom Line"	Ross Clyde	Lorianne T Overton	March 5, 2001	1.22
Zack obtains glasses which allow him to see the future.
22	22	"Sparkin'"	William Fruet	Steven Westren	February 12, 2001	1.19
Zack and Rita break-up and Zack creates some weird sparks that bring love between Cam and Gwen, Spencer and his reflection, and Zack with a girl named Sarah. Absent : Vernon
23	23	"Gone"	Ross Clyde	James Nadler	March 12, 2001	1.23
Zack drinks Gwen's ink and becomes invisible. Absent : Dan
24	24	"It's a Jungle in There"	William Fruet	Michael Maurer	March 20, 2001	1.24
Zack forgets to feed his neighbour's cat and plants which turns her apartment into a jungle.
25	25	"A Place of My Own"	Craig Pryce	Sheila Presscott	March 27, 2001	1.25
When Zack finally receives the key for his own apartment, he leaves his father and seems to enjoy adult life. That's until he organizes a party and gets expelled by mistake. Not only that, but he can't return to his old place since Dan converted his room into an office. Meanwhile, Dan tries again to seduce Jennifer.
26	26	"Dinner with Grandpa"	John Bell	Kathy Slevin	April 2, 2001	1.26
Zack and Dan have a familial dinner in which Zack's deceased grandfather Maurice wants to participate too. Notes: This is the final episode to feature Grandma Leah and Charles.

=== Season 2 (2001–02) ===
No. overall	No. in season	Title	Directed by	Written by	Original release date	Prod. code
27	1	"Blast from the Past"	Ross Clyde	Julie Lacey	September 17, 2001	2.01
While working on their class project, Zack and his friends turn the clock back in order to stay longer in the library. They travel to 1912 and manage to return to their time with a bonus: a past student who has fallen in love with Gwen.
28	2	"Searching for Zack Greenburg"	William Fruet	Heather Conkie	September 24, 2001	2.02
When Zack receives an F on his physics quiz the day before a huge test, he agrees to participate in an experiment which suddenly makes him smarter and smarter. After getting accused of cheating by Mr. Munk and Vernon after he gets an A+ on the test, Zack agrees to enter a physics competition due to his high level of sudden intelligence, causing a rift between him and Spence.
29	3	"The Terrible Truth"	Don McBrearty	Steven Westren	October 1, 2001	2.03
30	4	"Groovin'"	Harvey Crossland	William Nadler	October 8, 2001	2.04
Gwen desperately searches for a DJ and both Zack and Vernon want to participate. However, they both get possessed by an evil spirit.
31	5	"What's Eating Zack Greenburg"	Ross Clyde	Julie Nadler	October 15, 2001	2.05
When Dan finally decides to join Zack on his camping trip, he, Spence and Cam find themselves in a parallel world.
32	6	"In Your Dreams"	William Fruet	Esta Spalding	October 22, 2001	2.06
33	7	"Captain Sonic"	Don Shebib	David Young	November 5, 2001	2.07
Zack develops telekinetic powers.
34	8	"Zack Zero"	Anthony Brown	Ann McNaughton	November 12, 2001	2.08
35	9	"Zack Girl"				
36	10	"Dead Men Do Wear Plaid"	Don McBrearty	Peter Smith	November 26, 2001	2.10
Dan decides to coach Zack's football team but is possessed by an evil ghost of a former player whose only wish is to win.
37	11	"Frog Prince"	Craig Pryce	Gail Collins	December 3, 2001	2.11
When a swim team is organized at school, both Cam and Zack want to join in but Zack's competence is terrible. As Cam makes fun of him, Zack finds a frog lucky charm which turns Cam into a frog. Spence and Zack must find a way to restore Cam before Vernon takes his place on the swim team.
38	12	"Things to Do at Horace Hyde White When You're Dead"	Don Shebib	Steven Westren	January 7, 2002	2.12
When a ghost named Gilbert mysteriously reappears at school, he begins to wreak havoc by playing many stupid pranks. As Zack is the only one to see him, he gets blamed by Mr. Munk and Dan, and must find Gilbert's reason for coming back lest he get expelled.
39	13	"Bionic Zack"	Ross Clyde	Steven Barwin	January 14, 2002	2.13
Cam and Zack are on the same sports team when Zack complains about his lack of energy. However, when he saves his father's life by preventing a car from crushing him, he becomes stronger and stronger.
40	14	"Attack of the Killer Zack - Uum"	William Fruet	Denise Fordham	January 21, 2002	2.14
While cleaning up his room with Spence, Zack and his friend are shrunk and swallowed by the vacuum and it's up to Cam and Gwen to save them before an enormous spider eats them.
41	15	"Once and Future Zack"	John Bell	Heather Conkie	February 3, 2002	2.15
Zack becomes the new king of Broceliande after he rescues Merlin.
42	16	"Kleptomanizack"	Mary Lewis	Esta Spalding	February 10, 2002	2.16
When Zack decides to buy a birthday present for Sarah, he opts for a CD. He develops a magnetic field which attracts so many items that a policewoman accuses him of theft. He is finally released but is forbidden to return to the store. Notes: Noah Giffin is credited but does not speak. Also, the last appearance of Shadia Simmons as Sarah.
43	17	"Zack Times Two"	Don McBrearty	James Nadler	February 17, 2002	2.17
When a new mirror is installed, Zack's reflection comes to life. Zack's double appears to be very arrogant and ruthless, joining almost every club in school.
44	18	"Pop"	Ross Clyde	James Nadler	February 24, 2002	2.18
Zack's mother decides to pay a visit and brings him his favourite soda. However, Zack is torn between his two parents since his father wants to spend more masculine time with him. Every time Zack burps, he can teleport where he wants but Spence discovers his new power is limited.
45	19	"Zack and White"	Harvey Crossland	David A Young	March 3, 2002	2.19
When Zack and Spence both have a hard time choosing between Cam and Gwen in the election for class president, Zack admits that making a choice is very difficult. Spence suggests he participate in an experiment which has drastic effects as Zack finds himself in a black and white dimension where choices do not exist. Zack decides to become a rebel and enlist the help of Orwell, a new student who admires him because he has decided to lead and not be a sheep. At the end, Zack finally chooses to run for class president too, much to the displeasure of Cam and Gwen, while Spence complains about how his choices are now even harder to make.
46	20	"Little Big Zack"	Graeme Lynch	Julie Lacey	March 10, 2002	2.20
It's time for Zack to have his Bar-Mitzvah. But because he is afraid to grow up, he regresses back to his childhood and is now seven. Spence has to convince him to become a teenager again by saying to him that if he does not leave his kid status, he will never know how to drive, get a girlfriend, or enjoy forest trips. When the rabbi tells young Zack that everybody is afraid of the unknown but heroes have to face their fears while cowards always hide, Zack is convinced and goes back to normal.
47	21	"The Eyes of Gwen Killerby"	Ross Clyde	Steven Westren	March 17, 2002	2.21
48	22	"Zack Greenburg's Day Off"	Don Shebib	Michael Kramer	March 24, 2002	2.22
49	23	"Almost Famous Almost"	Gail Harvey	Mary Crawford and Alan Templeton	March 31, 2002	2.23
50	24	"The Zack Show"	William Fruet	Skander Halim	April 7, 2002	2.24
Zack receives a magical TV in his room and learns that the last channel shows his life in another dimension. Unless he wants his planet to be destroyed, Zack has to fight with Vernon while Cam must express his feelings for Gwen and Spence has to run more experiments. However, Vernon decides to finally give up his rivalry with Zack and become his friend.
51	25	"Who Did You Say I Was?"	Stuart J C Williams	Jennifer Conway	April 14, 2002	2.25
52	26	"Zackeo and Juliet"	John Bell	Peter Lieberman	May 5, 2002	2.26
Zack must learn Romeo's role in order to pass his English theater exam. However, he has learnt nothing, not even the story, and finds himself in another dimension where he plays Romeo while Gwen is Juliet, Cam is Tybalt and Spence is the monk.
