= Booky's Crush =

2009 Canadian television film

- Based on: That Scatterbrain Booky; With Love from Booky; As Ever, Booky by Bernice Thurman Hunter
- Screenplay by: Tracey Forbes
- Directed by: Peter Moss
- Starring: Rachel Marcus; Megan Follows; Stuart Hughes; Dylan Everett; Sarah White
- Theme music composer: Robert Carli
- Country of origin: Canada
- Original language: English

Production
- Producers: Armand Leo; Phyllis Platt
- Cinematography: Norayr Kasper
- Editor: Diane Brunjes
- Running time: 89 minutes
- Production companies: Canadian Broadcasting Corporation; Platt Productions; Shaftesbury Films

Original release
- Network: CBC
- Release: February 15, 2009

Booky's Crush is a 2009 Canadian made-for-TV drama film directed by Peter Moss. The screenplay was written by Tracey Forbes and based upon the Bernice Thurman Hunter novels That Scatterbrain Booky, With Love from Booky, and As Ever, Booky.

== Background ==
First announced in 2008, Booky's Crush is the third in a series of made-for-TV films about Beatrice 'Booky' Thomson, a little girl growing up in Toronto during the depression era. Her parents are played by real-life husband and wife Megan Follows and Stuart Hughes.

The first in this series covered a timeframe when Booky was a teenager. Booky Makes Her Mark (2006) starred Tatiana Maslany as Booky at 15 years old. The subsequent films in the series, both Booky and the Secret Santa (2007) and Booky's Crush (2009), were set in an earlier timeframe, with Rachel Marcus starring as Booky at 11 years old.

== Plot ==
The Thomsons are a working class family living in Toronto during the Great Depression. Parents, Thomas Thomson (Stuart Hughes) and Francie Thomson (Megan Follows) struggle to provide for their children, Willa (Sarah White), Arthur (Dylan Everett), Beatrice (nicknamed Booky) (Rachel Marcus) and Jakey (Noah Ryan Scott).

11-year-old Beatrice 'Booky' Thomson is showing her strength in reading and spelling, and has been asked to tutor Georgie Dunlop (Connor Price), an older sixth grader. This thrills Booky, as she has a crush on Georgie and hopes he will ask her to a school dance. But after Georgie gives her a strange gift, she begins to re-evaluate her feelings toward him.

Booky's older sister Willa Thomson, has a part-time job as a librarian. While at work, Willa meets and is attracted to Russell (Marc Bendavid), a medical student. With her senior year in high school beginning, and even though she knows her family cannot afford it, Willa gives thought toward attending medical school after she graduates.

Arthur has an artistic aptitude, and though his parents are supportive of his dreams, his father encourages him to consider a more stable profession, which places a strain on their father-son relationship.

Booky goes to the dance with Georgie. He turns up late and surprises her. He kisses her and that's all she talks about.

== Cast ==
- Rachel Marcus as Beatrice 'Booky' Thomson
- Megan Follows as Francie Thomson
- Stuart Hughes as Thomas Thomson
- Dylan Everett as Arthur Thomson
- Sarah White as Willa Thomson
- Ariel Waller as Rosie
- Connor Price as Georgie Dunlop
- Albert Schultz as Mr. Spencer
- Marc Bendavid as Russell
- Tom McCamus as Sidney McNeil
- Susan Coyne as Jeannie McNeil
- Bill Lake as Mr. Jenkins
- James Wallis as Gordo the Wolf Boy
- Thomas Price as Number 5
- Clyde Phillips as Factory Worker
- Noah Ryan Scott ... Jakey Thomson
- Emilia McCarthy ... Laura Westover
- Lisa Berry ... Librarian
- Marcia Bennett ... Elderly Woman
- Brad Borbridge ... Dave Juniper

== Recognition ==
Maria Kubacki, of the Calgary Sun notes that modern audiences can relate to the hardships faced in the 1930s when she writes "Booky's Crush might have been conceived as a nostalgia piece far removed from modern reality but given the current economic meltdown, CBC's Depression-era family drama suddenly seems strangely relevant."

=== Accolades ===
- 2009, Directors Guild of Canada nomination for 'DGC Team Award'
- 2009, Gemini Awards nomination for Dylan Everett for 'Best Performance by an Actor in a Featured Supporting Role in a Dramatic Program or Mini-Series'
- 2009, Gemini Awards nomination for Stuart Hughes for 'Best Performance by an Actor in a Featured Supporting Role in a Dramatic Program or Mini-Series'
- 2009, Gemini Awards nomination for Rachel Marcus for 'Best Performance by an Actress in a Leading Role in a Dramatic Program or Mini-Series'
- 2009, Gemini Awards nomination for Aidan Leroux, for 'Best Production Design or Art Direction in a Fiction Program or Series'

== See also ==
- 2009 in film
- Cinema of Canada
- List of Canadian films of 2009
