= Megan Follows =

Canadian-American actress and director

- Follows in 2026
- Born: Megan Elizabeth Laura Diana Follows; March 14, 1968 (age 58); Toronto, Ontario, Canada
- Occupations: Actress; director
- Years active: 1977–present
- Known for: Anne of Green Gables; Anne of Green Gables: The Sequel; Reign
- Spouse: Christopher Porter (m. 1991; div. 1996)
- Partner: Stuart Hughes (1996–2010)
- Children: 2
- Parent(s): Ted Follows; Dawn Greenhalgh
- Relatives: Edwina Follows (sister); Sean O'Bryan (brother-in-law)

Megan Elizabeth Laura Diana Follows (/ˈmiːɡən/ MEE-gən; born March 14, 1968) is a Canadian actress and director. She is known for her role as Anne Shirley in the 1985 Canadian television miniseries Anne of Green Gables and its two sequels. From 2013 to 2017, she starred as Catherine de' Medici, Queen of France, in the television drama series Reign.

== Early life ==
The daughter of actors Ted Follows and Dawn Greenhalgh, Follows's three siblings are all in the entertainment industry. Her elder sister Edwina is a writer, while her brother Laurence and sister Samantha Follows (who is married to American actor Sean O'Bryan) are also actors.

== Career ==
=== Beginnings ===
Her first acting job came at nine when she landed a spot in a commercial for Bell Canada. She was directed to make an impudent gesture out of a school bus window – like sticking out her tongue - but ended up making a rather obscene adult gesture instead. She found steady work in Canada, appearing in a few TV series such as Matt and Jenny, The Baxters, and The Littlest Hobo, the latter in which she guest-starred with her entire family in a three-part episode. She also starred in the short films The Olden Days Coat (1981) and Boys and Girls (1983), the latter of which won an Academy Award for Best Short Subject.

=== Anne of Green Gables ===
Follows' breakthrough occurred when she was cast as Anne Shirley in the 1985 Canadian made-for-television drama film Anne of Green Gables, as well as its two sequels. The part of "Anne" was a coveted role that she won over 3,000 other young girls. Director, producer and writer Kevin Sullivan chose her despite early worries during the audition process that she might be too old for the part. The miniseries, wholly produced in Canada, became successful worldwide and remains the highest-rated drama in Canadian television history.

Her performances earned her two Gemini awards for best actress in the first two miniseries, Anne of Green Gables and Anne of Green Gables: The Sequel, and a Gemini nomination for the third Anne installment, Anne of Green Gables: The Continuing Story. She did not reprise the role for the fourth film, Anne of Green Gables: A New Beginning, and Barbara Hershey took over the role.

In 2023, Follows directed an audiobook dramatisation of Anne of Green Gables. She said, "I loved the idea of going back and deeply immersing myself in the text, in the writing of Lucy Maud Montgomery."

=== Television ===
Follows has made many appearances on both Canadian and U.S. television. Among her earliest American television appearances were roles in a 1982 episode of The Facts of Life, as a cousin of Jo Polniaczek. The episode was intended as a backdoor pilot for a proposed spin-off. In 1984, Follows was in the short-lived series Domestic Life as Martin Mull's character's daughter. In Canada, she also appeared in a popular made-for-TV movie, Hockey Night, where she played Cathy, a young girl who played hockey on a previously all-male team.

She appeared in two TV movies in 1986, Sin of Innocence and Shattered ... If Your Kid's On Drugs. In 1989, she starred in an episode of The Ray Bradbury Theater, "The Dwarf". Airing on NBC on May 6, 1991, she played Peggy Ann in the made-for-television movie Cry in the Wild: The Taking of Peggy Ann, along with actors David Soul and David Morse. The plot is based on the true story of the abduction of Peggy Ann Bradnick by an ex-convict and ex-mental patient William Diller Hollenbaugh, which took place in Shade Gap, Pennsylvania on May 11, 1966.

In 1995, Follows (now known by her married name Megan Porter Follows) starred in an The Outer Limits episode "The Choice", along with Thora Birch. Follows also starred as the title character in an episode of Murder She Wrote, starring Angela Lansbury, called "Home Care". Other Canadian television appearances include leading roles in the period drama Under the Piano and police drama Major Crime.

Starting in 2000, she appeared on episodes of Law & Order, ER, The X-Files, CSI: Crime Scene Investigation, CSI: Miami, Cold Case, and Lie to Me, among others.

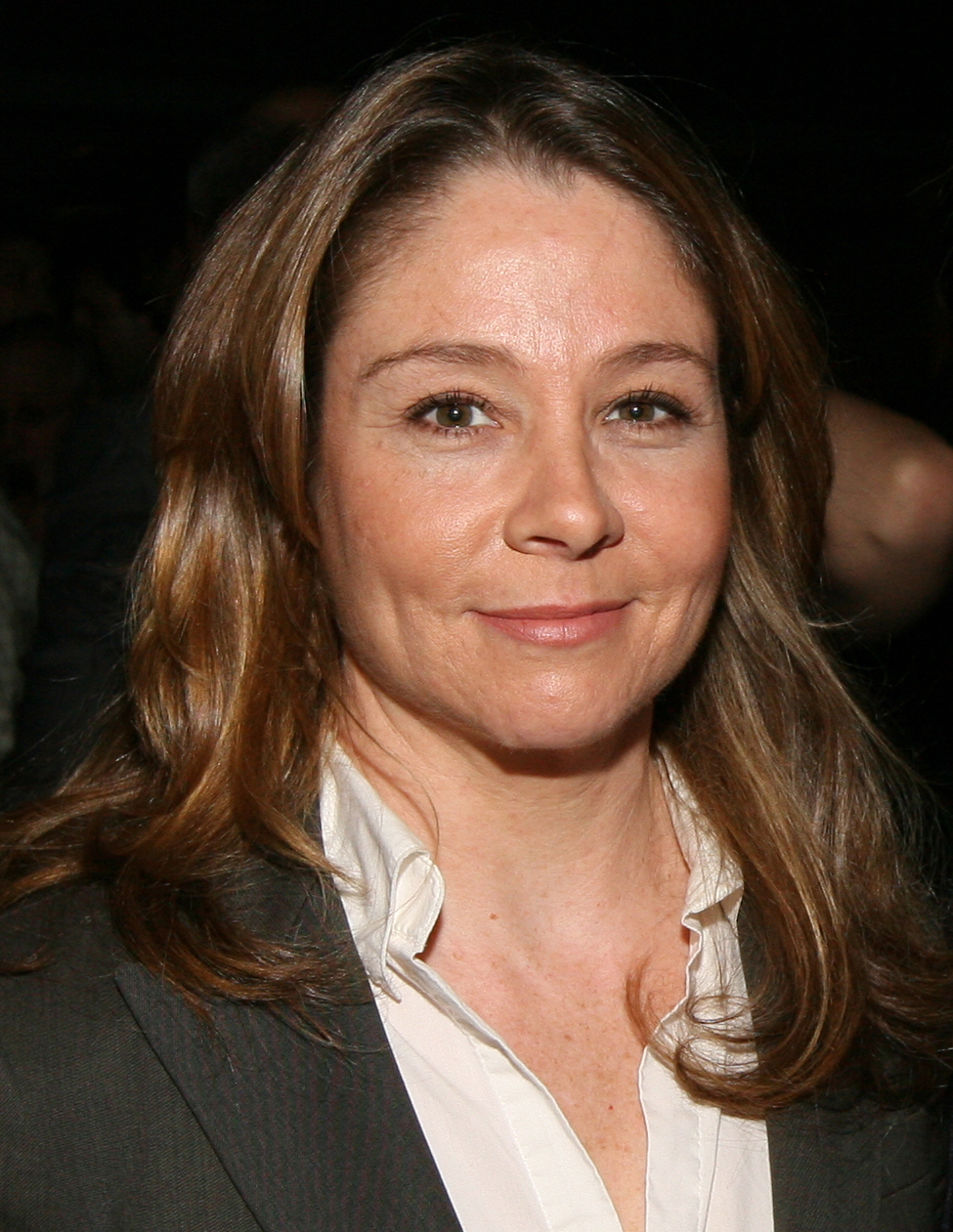
Follows in 2012

In 2004, Follows was part of the ensemble cast of the Hallmark movie Plainsong, which included Aidan Quinn, Rachel Griffiths, and America Ferrera. In 2005, she guest-starred in the Canadian ensemble drama Robson Arms as one of the tenants of the Robson Arms apartment complex. She also appeared in the hospital drama Open Heart as a nurse fighting a physician of malpractice, and in Shania: A Life in Eight Albums, as Sharon Twain. In 2007, she starred as Booky's mother in the three movie adaptations of Bernice Thurman Hunter's "Booky" series: Booky Makes Her Mark, Booky and the Secret Santa, and Booky's Crush.. In 2009, she made a guest appearance on Brothers and Sisters.

In 2011, she had a guest role on House. In 2012, she played Beth in Hollywood Heights, appeared as Alice Stewart in one episode of Longmire, and played Lady Maud in the Starz series World Without End. In 2013, she was cast as Catherine de' Medici on Reign, a historical drama series broadcast on The CW Network, based on the early life of Mary, Queen of Scots. The series ran for four seasons.

In 2016, she had a recurring role as the mother of the titular character on Wynonna Earp. In 2018, it was announced that Follows would be the lead director on Held, a psychological web series produced by Marblemedia. In 2020, it was announced that Follows would direct She Came Back, which was released in 2024 starring Amybeth McNulty. Follows has also appeared in several episodes of the CBC comedy-drama television series, Heartland, as Ty Borden's mother, as well as directing episodes of the series.

=== Film ===
Follows has appeared in feature films, the first co-starring with Corey Haim and Gary Busey in the 1985 film adaptation of Stephen King's novella, Silver Bullet. In 1990, she was the voice of Clara from the cartoon Christmas film The Nutcracker Prince. Her later film credits include Christmas Child, A Foreign Affair (2003; released on DVD as Two Brothers and a Bride), and a cameo in Laurie Lynd's Breakfast with Scot. She also had a brief uncredited cameo as a grocery store clerk in the movie I Am Number Four (2011).

=== Theatre ===
Follows' first stage credit was in the 1988 Toronto production of The Effect of Gamma Rays on Man-in-the-Moon Marigolds, in which she starred alongside her mother, Dawn, and her sister, Samantha. In 1992, she was offered the role of Juliet in the Stratford Festival's production of Romeo and Juliet, which she reprised the following year in Los Angeles. Other notable stage credits include A Doll's House (Minneapolis' Guthrie Theater), Othello (Edmonton's Citadel Theatre and Ottawa's National Arts Centre), Uncle Vanya (Atlantic Theatre Festival), and Noël Coward's Hay Fever, in which she appeared with her siblings, and which was directed by her father.

The 2000's saw the return of Follows on stage as a regular of the Toronto-based Soulpepper Theatre Company. In 2005, she had the leading role of May in the production of Fool for Love by Sam Shepard. The following year, she took on the role of Annie in Tom Stoppard's The Real Thing, which ran at Ottawa's National Arts Centre as a co-production between Soulpepper and NAC English Theatre. Following this run, the play made its way to Toronto as part of Soulpepper's 2006 season at the Young Centre for the Performing Arts. In 2007, she played the role of Marlene in the critically acclaimed summer production of Caryl Churchill's Top Girls with Soulpepper.

Soulpepper's 2008 season, marking the company's tenth anniversary, signaled the continuation of Megan's prolific theatre career. She appeared in two productions, Marsha Norman's 'night, Mother (in which she co-starred opposite her real-life mother, Canadian actress Dawn Greenhalgh) and Soulpepper's remount of Top Girls.

In 2010, Follows was in the Mirvish Productions's revival of Caryl Churchill's Cloud 9. In 2011, she starred in the Canadian premiere of Melissa James Gibson's This at the Vancouver Playhouse, directed by Amiel Gladstone. In 2012, she starred in the lead role of "Penelope" at the Nightwood Theatre's production of The Penelopiad.

== Personal life ==
In 1991, Follows married Christopher David Porter, a Canadian gaffer and photographer she met on the set of Deep Sleep. They have two children, Lyla Anne Porter (b. 1991) and Russell Porter (b. 1994). The couple divorced in 1996. Follows was in a long-term relationship with actor Stuart Hughes; they broke up around 2010.

== Humanitarian work ==
Follows has served as a spokeswoman for the relief organization World Vision Canada. She travelled to both Rwanda and Tanzania as a spokeswoman and a photographer. She also participated in the 2005 benefit concert Canada for Asia held to support the relief efforts for Asia after the 2004 Indian Ocean earthquake and tsunami.

She travelled to Cambodia in 2007 with the director Heather Connell to film Small Voices: Stories of Cambodia's Children. The documentary was about how the street children of Cambodia faced their living conditions amid poverty and abuse and how they viewed their future.

Follows is a member of the Canadian charity Artists Against Racism.

== Filmography ==
=== Film ===
Year	Title	Role	Notes	Ref.
1985	Silver Bullet	Jane Coslaw		
1987	Stacking	Anna Mae Morgan		
1988	A Time of Destiny	Irene		
1989	Termini Station	Micheline Dushane		
1990	The Nutcracker Prince	Clara Stahlbaum	Voice	
1993	When Pigs Fly	Kathleen		
1998	Reluctant Angel	Cheryl		
2003	A Foreign Affair	Lena		
2007	Breakfast with Scot	Barbara Warren	Cameo	
2011	I Am Number Four	Supermarket Cashier	Uncredited	
2019	Lie Exposed	Diane		
2024	She Came Back	Claire	Director	

=== Television ===
Year	Title	Role	Notes	Ref.
1978-79	A Gift to Last		Uncredited	
1979-80	Matt and Jenny	Jenny Tanner	Main cast	
1980	The Great Detective	Charity	Episode: "A Family Business"	
1981	The Olden Days Coat	Sal	TV movie	
1981-82	The Littlest Hobo	Rose/Marti Kendall	4 episodes	
1982	The Facts of Life	Terry Largo	Episode: "Jo's Cousin"	
1982-84	Hangin' In	Cassie	3 episodes	
1983	Boys and Girls	Margaret	TV movie	
1984	Domestic Life	Didi Crane	Main cast	
1984	Hockey Night	Cathy Yarrow	TV movie	
1985	Anne of Green Gables	Anne Shirley	TV movie	
1986	Sin of Innocence	Jenny Colleran	TV movie	
1987	Anne of Green Gables: The Sequel	Anne Shirley	TV movie	
1987	ABC Afterschool Special	Dana	Episode: "Seasonal Differences"	
1988	Inherit the Wind	Rachel Brown	TV movie	
1989	Champagne Charlie	Louise Heidsick	Main cast	
1989	The Ray Bradbury Theater	Aimee	Episode: "The Dwarf"	
1990	Back to Hannibal: The Return of Tom Sawyer and Huckleberry Finn	Becky Thatcher	TV movie	
1991	The Chase	Gloria Whipple	TV movie	
1991	Cry in the Wild: The Taking of Peggy Ann	Peggy Ann Bradnick	TV movie	
1993	The Hidden Room	Deanna Matthews	Episode: "Happily Ever After"	
1993-94	Second Chances	Kate Benedicts	10 episodes	
1995	The Outer Limits	Karen Ross	Episode: "The Choice"	
1995	Murder, She Wrote	Lila Nolan	Episode: "Home Care", credited as Megan Porter Follows	
1995	Under the Piano	Rosetta Brasilio	TV movie	
1999	Big Wolf on Campus	Violet Thorne	Episode: "Interview with a Werewolf"	
2000	Anne of Green Gables: The Continuing Story	Anne Shirley Blythe	TV movie	
2000	Law & Order	Megan Parnell	Episode: "Endurance"	
2000	Made in Canada	Mandy Forward	Episode: "Beaver Creek"	
2000	The Fugitive	Paula Bennett	Episode: "Miles to Go"	
2000	Family Law	Nancy Quinn	Episode: "Generations"	
2001	ER	Christy Larkin	Episode: "A Walk in the Woods"	
2001	The X-Files	Kath McCready	Episode: "Per Manum"	
2001	Mentors	Annie Oakley	Episode: "Hero"	
2001	The Division	Science Teacher	Episode: "Anything You Can Do"	
2002	Strong Medicine	Dana's Doctor	3 episodes	
2002	That's Life	Stella	Episode: "Gutterball"	
2003	Threat Matrix	Denise	Episode: "Veteran's Day"	
2004	CSI	Beth Darian	Episode: "Bad To The Bone"	
2004	Christmas Child	Meg Davenport	TV movie	
2005	CSI: Miami	Chloe Grand	Episode: "Whacked"	
2005	Robson Arms	Janice Keneally	4 episodes	
2005	Odd Job Jack	Herself	Episode: "Iron Temp"	
2005	Shania: A Life in Eight Albums	Sharon Twain	TV movie	
2005	Cold Case	Maura	Episode: "A Perfect Day"	
2005	Crossing Jordan	Beth	Episode: "Code of Ethics"	
2005	Booky Makes Her Mark	Francie Thomson	TV movie	
2007	Booky and the Secret Santa	Francie Thomson	TV movie	
2008	The Border	Moira Davis	Episode: "Good Intentions"	
2009	Booky's Crush	Francie Thomson	TV movie	
2009	Lie to Me	Lorraine Burch	Episode: "Do No Harm"	
2009	Brothers & Sisters	Maggie Stephens	Episode: "Missing'"	
2009	Raising the Bar	Reanne Chrisman	Episode: "No Child's Left Behind"	
2009-21	Heartland	Lily Borden	9 episodes	
2011	House	Jennifer Williams	Episode: "Changes"	
2012	Longmire	Alice Stewart	Episode: "A Damn Shame"	
2012	Hollywood Heights	Beth	2 episodes	
2012	World Without End	Maud	3 episodes	
2013-17	Reign	Catherine de'Medici	Main, 78 episodes	
2014	Republic of Doyle	Warden Barton	Episode: "Dirty Deeds"	
2015	Pirate's Passage	Meg O'Leary	Animated TV movie	
2017	Murdoch Mysteries	Megan Byrne	Episode: "Home for the Holidays"	
2018	Wynonna Earp	Michelle Gibson	6 episodes	
2020	October Faction	Edith Mooreland	8 episodes	
2021	The Republic of Sarah	Ellen Cooper	7 episodes	
2023	Hudson & Rex	Detective Sidney Scott	Episodes: "Northern Rexposure" and "Due North"	
2023	Rabbit Hole	Senator Evers	2 episodes	
2024	My Dead Mom	Fern		
2026	The Way Home	Tessa		
2026	Little House on the Prairie	Grandma	Episode: "Life Let Us Cherish"	

== Awards and nominations ==
Year	Association	Category	Work	Result	Ref.
1986	Gemini Awards	Best Performance by a Lead Actress in a Single Dramatic Program or Miniseries	Anne of Green Gables	Won	
1988	Gemini Awards	Best Performance by a Lead Actress in a Single Dramatic Program or Miniseries	Anne of Green Gables: The Sequel	Won	
1990	Genie Awards	Best Performance by an Actress in a Leading Role	Termini Station	Nominated	
2015	Canadian Screen Awards	Best Performance by an Actress in a Leading Role in a Dramatic Program or Mini-Series	Reign	Nominated	
2016	Canadian Screen Awards	Best Performance by an Actress in a Leading Role in a Dramatic Program or Mini-Series	Reign	Nominated	
2017	Canadian Screen Awards	Best Performance by an Actress in a Continuing Leading Dramatic Role	Reign	Nominated	
2025	Canadian Screen Awards	Best Lead Performance in a Web Program or Series	My Dead Mom	Won	
