= Bill Lake =

Canadian actor

Bill Lake (a.k.a. W.F. Lake) is a Canadian actor whose career began in Vancouver and who has appeared in many movies, television movies and series, stage plays and commercials. He has over 175 credits in a variety of productions since the 1970s.

== Career ==
Among his television credits are appearances in shows such as Monk, Queer as Folk, Sue Thomas: F.B.Eye, Earth: Final Conflict and Stoked. His movie credits include roles in The Hurricane, Martin and Lewis, Flash of Genius, Stir of Echoes: The Homecoming, Apartment Hunting and The Middle Man. In 2001, Lake had a recurring role in the television series Soul Food as Mr. Greene.

Lake played the obsessed Detective Miller, who goes after the drug lord Luigi Saracino, in Adrian Langley's 2013 film Crook. He also appeared in Johnathan Wright's 2018 film, Northern Lights of Christmas.

== Filmography ==
=== Film ===
Year	Title	Role	Notes
1979	The Shape of Things to Come	Spacesuited Man	
1980	Funeral Home	Frank	
1984	Bedroom Eyes	Forensic Man #2	
1986	Whodunit?	Pilot's voice	
1987	Blue Monkey	Paramedic	
1987	Street Justice	Aide	
1989	Walter & Carlo i Amerika	Peter	
1996	Lethal Tender	Lt. Wilson	
1998	Blind Faith	Large Man #1	
1998	Blackheart	VIP	
1999	The Hurricane	Philadelphia TV Announcer	
2000	Gossip	Lieutenant Miles	
2000	Apartment Hunting	Lecherous Man	
2001	Tart	Mr. Sellers	
2001	Full Disclosure	Del	
2001	The Safety of Objects	Baseball Coach	
2002	Death to Smoochy	Bartender	
2003	How to Deal	Ed	
2006	Hollywoodland	Cigar Man	
2008	Camille	Local Deputy #2	
2008	The American Trap	Herbert Hoover	
2008	Flash of Genius	Scott	
2011	Conduct Unbecoming	Grieving Man	
2012	Cold Blooded	Const. Gary Grescoe	
2013	Crook	Detective Miller	
2013	The Returned	The General	
2015	Pixels	NY Police Commissioner	
2015	Crimson Peak	Coroner	
2015	The Preacher's Sin	Bill Traggert	
2016	Special Correspondents	General	
2016	Girl in the Box	Desk Officer	
2016	A Family Man	Elise's Father	
2016	Total Frat Movie	Robert Taylor	
2016	Tell the World	William Miller	
2017	Kodachrome	Dwayne	
2017	Christmas Inheritance	Captain Williams	
2019	Buffaloed	Judge Connor	
2020	Fatman	Robert Taylor	
2021	Awake	Sheriff	
2021	The Middle Man	Mr. Stout	

=== Television ===
Year	Title	Role	Notes
1974	Police Surgeon	Billy	Episode: "The Loser"
1979–1985	The Littlest Hobo	Corpral Simpson	3 episodes
1984	Hangin' In	Gus	Episode: "Everybody Loves a Baby"
1985	Murder in Space	Technician	Television film
1986	Mafia Princess	Federal Agent	Television film
1988	Check It Out!	Patrick O'Malley	Episode: "Vote for Me"
1988	Friday the 13th: The Series	News Commentator	Episode: "Badge of Honor"
1989	Alfred Hitchcock Presents	Sam McKay	Episode: "Skeleton in the Closet"
1989, 1990	Street Legal	TV Anchorman / Newscaster	2 episodes
1990–1993	Top Cops	Various roles	4 episodes
1991	My Secret Identity	Dr. Herbert Hobbs	Episode: "Teen Hot Line"
1993	Catwalk	Surgeon	Episode: "Downtown"
1993	The Hidden Room	Lou	Episode: "No Word for Mercy"
1995	Road to Avonlea	Orderly	Episode: "Home Is Where the Heart Is"
1995	Remember Me	Walter	Television film
1995	Where's the Money, Noreen?	District Attorney	Television film
1995	Long Island Fever	Attorney	Television film
1996	Kung Fu: The Legend Continues	Alex	Episode: "Dragon's Lair"
1996	Goosebumps	Bus Driver	2 episodes
1996, 1997	F/X: The Series	Jerry O'Malley / Security Chief	2 episodes
1997	Fast Track	Servine Crew Chief	4 episodes
1997	On the 2nd Day of Christmas	Cop	Television film
1998	The Long Island Incident	Bill Leffert	Television film
1998	Giving Up the Ghost	George the Doorman	Television film
1998	The Defenders: Taking the First	Prison Guard	Television film
1998	My Own Country	Veteran	Television film
1999	Mind Prey	Everett Roux	Television film
1999	Psi Factor	Steve Marsh	Episode: "School of Thought"
1999	Rocky Marciano	Pilot	Television film
1999	I Was a Sixth Grade Alien	Henricks	Episode: "They Called Him Pleskit!"
1999	Spenser: Small Vices	Police Captain	Television film
1999	The Famous Jett Jackson	Umpire	Episode: "Field of Dweebs"
1999	Twice in a Lifetime	Sheriff	Episode: "Death and Taxes"
2000	Run the Wild Fields	Sheriff Bob	Television film
2000	Alley Cats Strike	Whipshaw McGraw	Television film
2000	A Tale of Two Bunnies	Man #2	Television film
2000	D.C.	Desk Sergeant	Episode: "Justice"
2000	Cheaters	Steinmetz Coach	Television film
2000	Code Name: Eternity	Officer Hoag	Episode: "The Long Drop"
2000	Who Killed Atlanta's Children?	GBI Man	Television film
2000	When Andrew Came Home	Desk Sergeant	Television film
2000	Jackie Bouvier Kennedy Onassis	Older Edward Kennedy	Television film
2000	Seventeen Again	Officer Ratto	Television film
2000, 2001	Earth: Final Conflict	Colonel Bastian	2 episodes
2000, 2001	In a Heartbeat	V.P. Carlson	2 episodes
2001	Bojangles	Director	Television film
2001	Jackie, Ethel, Joan: The Women of Camelot	Policeman	Television film
2001	Final Jeopardy	Chief Flanders	Television film
2001	The Judge	Chief Wallace Hansen	Episode: "Part One"
2001	Sex, Lies & Obsession	Tom Gates	Television film
2001	Soul Food	Mr. Greene	3 episodes
2001	Jane Doe	Sheriff	Television film
2001	Stolen Miracle	Shane Miller	Television film
2002	Doc	Charlie	Episode: "All in the Family"
2002	Crossed Over	Gatehouse Guard	Television film
2002	Torso: The Evelyn Dick Story	Railway Supervisor	Television film
2002	Recipe for Murder	Ernie Spencer	Television film
2002	All Around the Town	Mark Levine	Television film
2002	Crossing the Line	Joe Fulton	Television film
2002	Monk	Hardware Owner	Episode: "Mr. Monk and the Psychic"
2002	Power and Beauty	Fred	Television film
2002	RFK	Mr. Murphy	Television film
2002	The Glow	Fire Captain	Television film
2002	Conviction	Peters	Television film
2002	Adventure Inc.	Captain Dillon	Episode: "Message from the Deep"
2002	Master Spy: The Robert Hanssen Story	Father Bill	Television film
2002	Martin and Lewis	Hal B. Wallis	Television film
2002	The Man Who Saved Christmas	Secretary Daniels	Television film
2002	Salem Witch Trials	Goodman Tarbell	Television film
2002, 2003	Queer as Folk	Tom	2 episodes
2003	The Wonderful World of Disney	Deputy	Episode: "Sounder"
2003	Good Fences	Inspector Wilkins	Television film
2003	Jasper, Texas	Council Member #1	Television film
2003	Street Time	Top Cop	Episode: "Going Home"
2003	Wild Card	Katy's father	Episode: "Hell Week"
2004	Sue Thomas: F.B.Eye	S.A.C. Prentis	Episode: "The Mentor"
2004	The Grid	Tanker Captain	Miniseries
2004	Wonderfalls	Detective Sloan	2 episodes
2004	While I Was Gone	Sergeant Eberhart	Television film
2004, 2007	True Crimes: The First 72 Hours	Frank Roselli / Guard	2 episodes
2004–2007	ReGenesis	Various roles	3 episodes
2005	Revelations	Prison Doctor	Episode: "Hour Three"
2005	Our Fathers	Fire Chief Wiliams	Television film
2005	Swarmed	Chief of Police	Television film
2005–2013	Air Crash Investigation	Various roles	4 episodes
2006	G-Spot	Security Officer	Episode: "Sunburn"
2006	Jeff Ltd.	Lafountaine	Episode: "Tears of a Clown"
2006	Solar Attack	Captain Misha Gregorovitch	Television film
2006	The Wives He Forgot	Police Captain	Television film
2006	The State Within	Head Joint Chiefs	Episode #1.5
2007	In God's Country	Thomas	Television film
2007	The Dresden Files	Captain Hackett	Episode: "Second City"
2007	'Til Death Do Us Part	Helpful Driver / Detective	2 episodes
2007	Billable Hours	Man in elevator	Episode: "Corporate Retreat"
2007	Stir of Echoes: The Homecoming	Colonel	Television film
2009	Booky's Crush	Mr. Jenkins	Television film
2009	Warehouse 13	Dave	Episode: "Magnetism"
2009	Stoked	Sonny	11 episodes
2009	The Border	Kenneth Porter	Episode: "Spoils of War"
2010	You Lucky Dog	Sheriff Hoskins	Television film
2011	XIII: The Series	Sheriff Quinn	Episode: "Green Falls"
2011	Alphas	Transit Sergeant	Episode: "Anger Management"
2012	My Mother's Secret	Sheriff John Greely	Television film
2012	Bomb Girls	Colonel Branson	Episode: "How You Trust"
2012	An Officer and a Murderer	Suspect #1	Television film
2012	The Listener	Colonel Ranna	Episode: "Now You See Him"
2012	The L.A. Complex	Frank	Episode: "Now or Never"
2013	Cracked	Officer Pierce	Episode: "The Thump Parade"
2013	Alien Mysteries	Lance	Episode: "Stephenville Lights"
2013	King & Maxwell	Charge Sergeant	Episode: "Pilot"
2013	The Husband She Met Online	Jerry Berman	Television film
2013	Oh Christmas Tree!	Fire Marshall	Television film
2014	Murdoch Mysteries	Frank Rivers	Episode: "Murdoch Takes Manhattan"
2015	Degrassi: The Next Generation	Detective	2 episodes
2015	Degrassi: Don't Look Back	Detective	Television film
2015	Charming Christmas	Bill Boyd	Television film
2015, 2017	Patriot	Tim Peetnam	3 episodes
2016	Man Seeking Woman	Police Captain	Episode: "Scythe"
2016	The Girlfriend Experience	Carson Lewis	9 episodes
2017	The Kennedys: After Camelot	Mayor Richard Daley	Episode #1.1
2017	Taken	Jimmy Dunne	Episode: "Solo"
2017	Christmas in Angel Falls	Pastor Howard	Television film
2018	A Christmas in Tennessee	Mayor Paul	Television film
2018	Blackout	Bill Tremblay	2 episodes
2018	Northern Lights of Christmas	Chuck Baker	Television film
2019	Wayne	Sheriff	Episode: "Chapter Six: Who Even Are We Now?"
2019	Angel Falls: A Novel Holiday	Pastor Howard	Television film
2020	Spinning Out	George	2 episodes
2020	Heart of the Holidays	Bob	Television film
2020	The Hardy Boys	Ezra Collig	7 episodes
2021	Christmas Beneath the Stars	Warren Locke	Television film
2022	The Lake	Horny Henderson	7 episodes
