= Rachel Marcus =

Canadian actress and voice artist

- Occupations: Actress; Voice artist
- Years active: 2007-present
- Known for: Booky and the Secret Santa; Booky's Crush; Stella and Sam

Rachel Marcus is a Canadian actress and voice artist best known for her role as Beatrice 'Booky' Thomson in Booky and the Secret Santa (2007) and Booky's Crush (2009).

== Career ==
Marcus' first acting job, apart from school plays, was when at the age of 10 years she landed the starring role of Beatrice 'Booky' Thomson in Booky and the Secret Santa, a made for TV film based upon the novel series by Bernice Thurman Hunter. For her performance as Booky, Marcus received a 2008 Gemini Awards nomination. Her second starring film role was a year later when she reprised her role as Booky for Booky's Crush, for which she received another Gemini Awards nomination. In 2008, she joined the cast of Stoked which premiered on June 25, 2009 on Teletoon. From 2011 to 2015, she voiced Stella in the animated series Stella and Sam.

== Filmography ==
Film and television
Year	Title	Role	Notes
2007	Booky and the Secret Santa	Beatrice "Booky" Thomson	TV film
2009	Booky's Crush	Beatrice "Booky" Thomson	TV film
2009	Stoked	Erica (voice)	Recurring role (11 episodes)
2010	The Dogfather	Olivia	
2010	Peep and the Big Wide World	Young Groundhog	Voice; Episode: “Bringing Spring”
2010	Vacation with Derek	Maddie	TV film
2010	The Devil's Teardrop	Shannon Kincaid	TV film
2010	Being Erica	Young Erica	Episode: "Fa La Erica"
2011	Wild Kratts	Ellie (voice)	Episode: "Mystery of the Squirmy Wormy"
2011	Stella and Sam	Stella (voice)	Main role (26 episodes)

== Recognition ==
=== Awards and nominations ===
- 2008, Gemini Awards nomination for 'Best Performance by an Actress in a Leading Role in a Dramatic Program or Mini-Series' for Booky and the Secret Santa
- 2009, Gemini Awards nomination for 'Best Performance by an Actress in a Leading Role in a Dramatic Program or Mini-Series' for Booky's Crush
