= Booky and the Secret Santa =

2007 Canadian television film

- Written by: Joe Wiesenfeld
- Directed by: Peter Moss
- Starring: Rachel Marcus; Megan Follows
- Music by: Robert Carli
- Country of origin: Canada
- Original language: English

Production
- Producers: Armand Leo; Laurie McLarty; Phyllis Platt
- Cinematography: Norayr Kasper
- Editor: Diane Brunjes
- Production companies: Platt Productions, Shaftesbury Films

Original release
- Network: CBC Television
- Release: 11 December 2007

Booky and the Secret Santa is a 2007 Canadian family television film directed by Peter Moss from a book adapted by Joe Wiesenfeld and written by Bernice Thurman Hunter. It stars Rachel Marcus and Megan Follows. The film first aired on December 11, 2007 on CBC Television. A prequel set five years before 2006's Booky Makes Her Mark, all the juvenile roles were recast.

== Premise ==
Booky (Rachel Marcus) tries to bring her family the best Christmas possible, despite hard times during the Great Depression of the 1930s when her dad (Stuart Hughes) loses his job. She gets help from her mum (Megan Follows) and a department store owner (Kenneth Welsh).

== Cast ==
- Rachel Marcus as Beatrice 'Booky' Thomson
- Megan Follows as Francie Thomson
- Kenneth Welsh as Mr. Eaton
- Stuart Hughes as Thomas Thomson
- Emilia McCarthy as Laura Westover
- Sarah White as Willa Thomson
- Dylan Everett as Arthur Thomson
- Noah Ryan Scott as Jakey Thomson
- Libby Adams as Ada May
- Nahanni Johnstone as Anne Westover
- Jane Sowerby as Aunt Susan
- Miles Potter as Henry Westover
- Diane D'Aquila as Mrs. Eaton

== Recognition ==
=== Awards and nominations ===
- 2008, Directors Guild of Canada nomination for 'DGC Team Award'
- 2008, Gemini Awards nomination for 'Best Sound in a Dramatic Program'
- 2008, Gemini Awards nomination for Nahanni Johnstone for 'Best Performance by an Actress in a Featured Supporting Role in a Dramatic Program or Mini-Series'
- 2008, Gemini Awards nomination for Megan Follows for 'Best Performance by an Actress in a Leading Role in a Dramatic Program or Mini-Series'
- 2008, Gemini Awards nomination for Rachel Marcus for 'Best Performance by an Actress in a Leading Role in a Dramatic Program or Mini-Series'

== See also ==
- List of Christmas films
