= Stuart Hughes =

Canadian actor

- Born: August 9, 1959 (age 67)
- Years active: 1983–present
- Spouse: Michelle Monteith (m. 2011)
- Partner: Megan Follows (1996–2010)
- Children: 1

Stuart Hughes (born June 9, 1959) is a Canadian actor known for his leading roles on the stages of many Canadian theatre companies, including Shaw Festival, Stratford Festival and Soulpepper Theatre Company (of which he is a founding member).

== Education ==
As a teenager, Hughes lived in London, Ontario, where he attended Saunders Secondary School and played French horn and violin in the school orchestra and band. He performed in school drama productions and also had roles in plays at Theatre London.

== Career ==
Hughes has received many award nominations for his work in film and television, and on stage. He has received three Dora Awards for the roles of Billy in The Collected Works of Billy the Kid, The Man in On the Verge (Tarragon Theatre) and Kit Carson in The Time Of Your Life (Soulpepper). He received an ACTRA Award for his lead role in the film The Drawer Boy.

He appeared in Mayday season 12 episode 1, as Commandant James Gibson (2012). He also played Oscar "Butch" Bowers in the 2017 film version of It.

== Filmography ==
=== Film ===
Year	Title	Role	Notes
1996	Bogus	Airline Agent	
2005	Where the Truth Lies	1st Journalist	
2006	Troubled Waters	Ben Tomlinson	
2007	This Beautiful City	Peter	
2010	Small Town Murder Songs	Billy	
2012	I Was a Boy	Brian	
2016	Lavender	Dr. Michaels	
2017	The Drawer Boy	Angus	
2017	It	Officer Bowers	
2018	Into Invisible Light	David	
2021	Die in a Gunfight	Henry Gibbon	
2024	Longing	Principal	
2024	The Apprentice	Mike Wallace	
2025	A Breed Apart	Thomas Pender	
2025	Frankenstein	2nd Old Hunter	
2026	Back in Black	Dale	

=== Television ===
Year	Title	Role	Notes
1983	Hangin' In	Roger Gold	Episode: "The Talk Show"
1988	Blades of Courage	David Frye	Television film
1989	Love and Hate	Charlie Wilde	Television film
1995	Picture Windows	Michael	Episode: "Soir Bleu"
1995	Forever Knight	Vudu	2 episodes
1995	Kung Fu: The Legend Continues	Marshall	Episode: "Destiny"
1996	Moonshine Highway	Stopwatch Man	Television film
1996	We the Jury	Fletcher Low	Television film
1997	Psi Factor	Joey Veloz	Episode: "Anasazi Cave/Devil's Triangle"
1997	A Taste of Shakespeare	Bassanio	Episode: "The Merchant of Venice"
1998	Evidence of Blood	Young Luther Snow	Television film
1999	Monet: Shadow and Light	Claude Monet	Television film
2002	The Stork Derby	Sam Gregory	Television film
2003	Street Time	George Phips	Episode: "Even"
2006	Booky Makes Her Mark	Thomas Thomson	Television film
2007	Booky and the Secret Santa	Thomas Thomson	Television film
2009	Booky's Crush	Thomas Thomson	Television film
2010	Bloodletting & Miraculous Cures	Dr. Norby	2 episodes
2011	The Listener	Jerry	Episode: "Lady in the Lake"
2011	Republic of Doyle	Simon Walters	2 episodes
2011	Breakout Kings	Dr. Lockwood	Episode: "Like Father, Like Son"
2011, 2017	Murdoch Mysteries	Various roles	2 episodes
2012	The Firm	Martin Moxon	8 episodes
2012	An Officer and a Murderer	Mr. Dewalt	Television film
2012, 2014	Air Crash Investigation	Captain James Gibson	2 episodes
2013	Bomb Girls	Mahoney	2 episodes
2014	Not With My Daughter	Bill	Television film
2015	Remedy	Officer Scott	Episode: "Looking for Satellites"
2015	Blood and Water	Dr. Lewis	2 episodes
2016	Killjoys	Herin	Episode: "Johnny Be Good"
2017	Incorporated	Jimmy	Episode: "Sweating the Assets"
2017	Sometimes the Good Kill	Joseph Kinsella	Television film
2017	Orphan Black	Cooper	4 episodes
2018	Return to Christmas Creek	Dan Hayes	Television film
2018, 2020	Burden of Truth	Pastor Parson	2 episodes
2019	Diggstown	Tavis Southwell	Episode: "Taisir Ahmed"
2019	Jett	Sweeney	2 episodes
2019	Carter	Wyatt Buchanan	Episode: "Harley Gets An Office Job"
2019	Our Christmas Love Song	Hunter	Television film
2020	Self Made	Percy Saunders	Episode: "A Credit to the Race"
2020	A Christmas Carousel	Roy	Television film
2020–2021	In the Dark	Detective Miller	6 episodes
2021	Frankie Drake Mysteries	Detective McIntosh	2 episodes
2021	Departure	Surgeon	Episode: "Don't Tread on Me"
2021	The Expanse: One Ship	Liang Walker	Episode: "Ankawala"
2021–2022	The Expanse	Liang Walker	4 episodes
