= Tracey Forbes =

Canadian television writer and producer

Tracey Forbes is a Canadian television writer and producer. She has worked on numerous Canadian and American television shows including Flashpoint, The Bridge, Spider-Man: The New Animated Series and Buffy the Vampire Slayer. In 2012/2013, she co-created, wrote and executive produced the TV drama series Cracked on CBC in Canada.

Forbes also wrote the made-for-TV movie Booky's Crush in 2009, based on the Booky novels by Bernice Thurman Hunter, and Girlfriend in a Coma based on Douglas Coupland's novel.
