= Noah Ryan Scott =

Canadian teen actor (born 2000)

- Born: August 26, 2000 (age 25); Brampton, Canada

Noah Ryan Scott (born August 26, 2000) is a Canadian actor best known for his role as Jakey Thomson in Booky and the Secret Santa (2007) and Booky's Crush (2009).

== Career ==
Scotts' first role in a film was when at 6 years old he landed the role of 'Jakey Thomson' in Booky and the Secret Santa, a made for TV film based upon the novel series by Bernice Thurman Hunter. He returned to reprise his role as 'Jakey Thomson' a year later in Booky's Crush. In 2010, Scott was cast as 'Young Darryl' in the Canadian feature film Moon Point. Featured television work includes Little Mosque on the Prairie (2007), Doodlebops Rockin' Road Show (2010), The Bridge (2010) and Rick Mercer Report (2006 - 2013). Scotts' latest role is a lead in the new Canadian Web series Kid's Town where he plays the Mayors son 'Jamie Redshaw'.

== Filmography ==
Film and Television
Year	Title	Role	Notes
2007	Booky and the Secret Santa	Jakey Thomson	TV film
2007	The Latest Buzz	Boy	The Happy Holidays Issue
2008	Little Mosque on the Prairie	Crying Child	Episode S2.E14 Welcome to Mercy
2008	Death and the Housewife	Jake	Short Film
2009	Booky's Crush	Jakey Thomson	TV movie
2009	Grown-Up for a Day	Evan	Short Film
2010	The Girl Who Cried Pearls	Dallas	Film
2010	Doodlebops Rockin' Road Show	Henry	History Mystery Tour
2011	Moon Point	Young Darryl	Feature Film
2012	Sunshine Sketches of a Little Town	(voice)	TV movie
2006 - 2013	The Rick Mercer Report	Son	TV series (7 episodes)
2013	Kid's Town	Jamie Redshaw (series lead)	Web series
