= Norayr Kasper =

Italian-Canadian cinematographer and artist

Norayr Kasper is a Canadian cinematographer and artist. He is most noted for his work on the 2014 film Fall, for which he was a Canadian Screen Award nominee for Best Cinematography at the 3rd Canadian Screen Awards in 2015.

Grew up in Venice, Kasper studied (BFA) cinema and film production at Concordia University in Montreal, and regularly works in both Canadian and European cinema. His other credits have included the theatrical films Calendar, The Life Before This, Two Thousand and None, Time of the Wolf, Zenne Dancer, Faith, Fraud, & Minimum Wage, Hellions and Goodbye Happiness (Au revoir le bonheur), the television films The Last Debate, Trudeau, Shania: A Life in Eight Albums, Booky Makes Her Mark, Last Exit and Booky and the Secret Santa, and episodes of the television series Cracked.
