= Jane Blake =

Jane Blake may refer to:

- Jane Blake, character in The Secret Circle (TV series)
- Jane Blake, character in Open Heart (TV series)
