= That Scatterbrain Booky =

1981 novel by Bernice Thurman Hunter

That Scatterbrain Booky is a 1981 novel by Bernice Thurman Hunter. It was the first in a trilogy.

The novel, set in 1932-33, is narrated by ten-year-old Beatrice "Booky" Thomson as she and her family live in Toronto during the Great Depression.

She was nominated for a 1982 Toronto Book Award.

== Adaptations ==
A play based on the book debuted at the Cascade Theatre as part of the 10th Annual Children's Book Festival, held at the Royal Ontario Museum, Toronto in November 1986.

A new musical by Joey Miller debuted in March 1991 at the Young People's Theatre, Toronto, running for at least two months.

The production received eight nominations for the 1991 Dora Mavor Moore Awards, winning three:

- Outstanding new revue or musical (writer and composer), Joey Miller (win)
- Outstanding production (producer), Young People's Theatre
- Outstanding direction, Peter Moss (win)
- Outstanding choreography, William Orlowski (win)
- Outstanding performance by a male, Paul Brown
- Outstanding performance by a female, Mary Ann MacDonald
- Outstanding set design, Leslie Frankish
- Outstanding costume design, Leslie Frankish

The book was adapted into a TV film in 1992, produced by Atlantis Communications and Peter Moss. It starred Renessa Blitz as Booky, and appearances from Gerard Parkes and Patricia Hamilton.
