= Troubled Waters (2006 film) =

2006 television film

- North America DVD cover
- Directed by: John Stead
- Written by: David Robbeson
- Starring: Jennifer Beals; Jonathan Goad; David Storch; Shauna Black; Stuart Hughes
- Cinematography: Brett Van Dyke
- Edited by: Tad Seaborn
- Music by: Eric Cadesky; Nick Dyer
- Release dates: December 2006 (Canada); January 9, 2007 (U.S.)
- Running time: 95 minutes
- Country: Canada
- Language: English

Troubled Waters is a 2006 Canadian thriller film directed by John Stead. It was filmed in Hamilton, Ontario, Canada.

== Plot ==
Special Agent Jennifer Beck (Jennifer Beals) is an intrepid FBI agent who is assigned to solve the case of a multimillionaire couple's missing daughter. As the clues begin to reveal themselves, Beck, who has a secret gift of clairvoyance, tries to connect the kidnapper to the girl's mother, who is having an affair with her husband's business partner/best friend. It is revealed that the business partner and mother had recently hired a hit man to kill the father. The father was supposed to be in New York for a period of time in the past, but returned early before the hit man could kill him. Now, it seems like that same hit man has kidnapped the daughter instead and is making it look like the business partner is the kidnapper. The mother confronts the partner with a gun and an intense argument rages between the two causing the partner to accidentally shoot and kill the mother. The FBI run in and shoot the business partner believing that not only did he kill the mother, but the daughter must be dead as well.

The father resigns from his job and apparently plans to leave the country hearing about the deaths of all of his loved ones. Agent Beck still feels that something is not right about this case. By touching the different objects in custody such as the teddy bear and cell phones, she realizes the father set up the kidnapping after finding out his wife and best friend were planning his murder. The girl is safe in the care of a nanny that had worked for the parents, but disappeared months earlier, in Chile.

The last scene shows the father meeting with the nanny in an outside Chile restaurant and kissing her. He turns to watch his daughter walk towards him when an unknown adult blocks the daughter's way and gives her the teddy bear back. The daughter smiles in delight, but the father's face shows his confusion. The unknown adult turns and it is Agent Beck.

== Cast ==
- Jennifer Beals – Special Agent Jennifer Beck
- Jonathan Goad – Agent Andy Hunter
- David Storch – Mike Waters
- Shauna Black – Julia Waters
- Stuart Hughes – Ben Tomlinson
- Olivia Ballantyne – Megan Waters
- Sharon Lewis – Agent Tina Davis
- Laura Vandervoort – Carolyn
- Nicole Dos Santos – Maria
- Frank Moore – Special Agent Turner
- Matt Birman – Special Agent Stokes
- Stewart Arnott – Doctor
- Christopher Cordell – Agent Reynolds (as Chris Cordell)
