= Undercover Grandpa =

- Film poster
- Directed by: Érik Canuel
- Screenplay by: Jeffrey Alan Schechter
- Produced by: Ronald J. Gilbert; Arnie Zipursky
- Starring: James Caan; Jessica Walter; Louis Gossett Jr.; Dylan Everett; Paul Sorvino; Kenneth Welsh
- Cinematography: Pierre Gill
- Edited by: Jean-Francois Bergeron
- Music by: Michel Corriveau; Luc St. Pierre
- Production companies: CCI Entertainment; Grandpa Productions Ltd. Productions de Grand-Pere; Corus Entertainment
- Distributed by: Elevation Pictures
- Release date: July 7, 2017
- Running time: 99 minutes
- Country: Canada
- Language: English

Undercover Grandpa is a 2017 Canadian action comedy film directed by Érik Canuel (his final film before his death in 2024) and starring James Caan, Jessica Walter, Louis Gossett Jr., Dylan Everett, Paul Sorvino and Kenneth Welsh.

== Plot ==
Jake and Wendall are two high school friends trying to get Jake a date with Angie. She agrees to a date for an upcoming party but Jake's parents insist Jake stay home for a dinner with Grandpa Lou. Jake is going to miss his first date with the girl of his dreams and no less has to hear crazy Grandpa's dubious war stories again. Grandpa is paranoid and sees the enemy around every corner.

Angie gets kidnapped by a Russian General Komencho. Unknown to Jake, Grandpa is a retired intelligence officer. He is unable to get any help from government officials. Grandpa Lou gets his grandson's trust and they decide to rescue Angie on their own.

Grandpa collects together Wolf, Harry, Mother and Giovani, his old group who were known as the 'Devil's Scum'. Also, Jake enlists the computer and cell phone expertise of his friend, Wendall. There are a lot of comic situations and corny lines between the young and old characters.

Grandpa's forces defeat the Russians and Angie is freed. As Maddy Harcourt government agents arrive on the scene, Grandpa is seen grabbing his chest and is rushed off to the hospital.

The next scene takes us to a graveside funeral for Grandpa Lou. Family and friends pay tribute with grandson Jake crying. The old timers present Lou's identity discs to Jake.

One month later a car pulls up in front of Jake's home. Grandpa Lou gets out and tells Jake that his death was only a cover like his "old man crazy act" was a cover for his first retirement.

Grandpa and Maddy then drive off for a life in Mexico.

== Cast ==
- James Caan as Grandpa - Major Lou Crawford
- Dylan Everett as Jake Bouchard
- Greta Onieogou as Angie Wagner
- Jesse Bostick as Wendall
- Jessica Walter as Madelein 'Maddy' Harcourt
- Paul Braunstein as General Komenkho
- Louis Gossett Jr. as Mother
- Kenneth Welsh as Harry Nederlander
- Paul Sorvino as Giovanni
- Lawrence Dane as Wolf
- Jennifer Robertson as Mrs. Bouchard
- Jonathan Higgins as Mr. Bouchard

== Reception ==
Sandie Angulo-Chen of Common Sense Media gave the film three stars out of five. Frank Scheck of The Hollywood Reporter gave the film a negative review describing it as "(n)either remotely thrilling or funny" and that it "isn't any fun." Edward Douglas of Film Journal International also gave the film a negative review and wrote "It’s hard to call Undercover Grandpa a 'comedy,' since there’s never anything particularly funny about it." The film was released on Netflix streaming on November 1, 2017.
