= Stella and Sam =

- Genre: Preschool
- Based on: Stella and Sam by Marie-Louise Gay
- Directed by: Raymond Jafelice; Dave Merritt
- Voices of: Rachel Marcus; Miles Johnson; Tony Daniels
- Theme music composer: Emilie Mover
- Composers: Trevor Yulie; Jody Colero
- Country of origin: Canada
- Original language: English
- No. of seasons: 2
- No. of episodes: 52

Production
- Executive producer: John Leitch
- Producer: John Leitch
- Running time: 11 minutes
- Production companies: Radical Sheep Productions; Bejuba! Entertainment; Mercury Filmworks

Original release
- Network: Family Channel (Canada); Sprout/Universal Kids (US)
- Release: February 14, 2011 – March 12, 2014

Stella and Sam is a Canadian animated children's TV series based on the book series of the same name by Marie-Louise Gay. The series was developed for television by Radical Sheep Productions. This series no longer airs on Family Jr. in Canada as of September 1, 2016. The French-language version of this show, dubbed Stella et Sacha, premiered on Disney Junior Télé (formerly as "Playhouse Disney") on October 3, 2010. The English-language version of the series premiered on the former Disney Junior channel on January 9, 2011.

== Synopsis ==
In Manitoba, a nine-year-old girl named Stella guides her four-year-old brother, Sam, through the wild spaces beyond their back porch. For her, the great outdoors is more than just a place – it's a playmate. Sam learns that, with a little imagination, everyday items can be anything he wants it to be. For example, a chair can be a spaceship, a meadow houses dragons, and a tall tree transform into a pirate ship. Their adventures give Sam some questions. In turn, Stella has an endless supply of answers – as long as you're not too fussy about the facts.

== Production and music ==
The show's theme music is performed by Quebec-based singer Emilie Mover.

The show is Flash-animated, but it is made with Toon Boom Harmony.

== Telecast and home media ==
Stella & Sam no longer airs on Family Jr. in Canada as of September 1, 2016. The French-language version of this show, dubbed Stella et Sacha, premiered on Disney Junior Télé (formerly as "Playhouse Disney") on October 3, 2010. The English-language version of the series premiered on the former Disney Junior channel on January 9, 2011.

In Canada, eOne released all of the series on DVD while US distributor Cinedigm acquired the show's rights.

In Fall 2013 until 2018, it formerly aired on Sprout in the US, but rebranded as Universal Kids.

On April 2, 2018, the show started airing on the CBC Kids block. It premiered on now-defunct US Qubo a day before. Currently, the show ever streamed on NBCUniversal's Peacock, The Roku Channel, and Toon Goggles.

== Voice cast and characters ==
- Rachel Marcus as Stella Bocquelet, a nine-year-old redhead, who is Sam's imaginative and fun-loving older sister.
- Miles Johnson as Sam Bocquelet, a four-year-old boy, who is Stella's younger brother.
- Tony Daniels as Fred, Stella's and Sam's pet dog and a constant companion.
- Robbie Fitzroy as Owen, Sam's best friend of African-Canadian heritage. He is identically years old.
- Christina Orjalo as Ivy, Stella's female best friend who is also identically years old. She is of Japanese-Canadian heritage.
- Jake Sim as Felix, Stella's male best friend and classmate. Furthermore, he is identically years old.
- Pattycake, Felix's pet cat, but named after a clapping song.

== Episodes ==
=== Season 1 (2011) ===
No.	Title	Original release date
1	"Hand Me Down Sweater/Breakfast for Two"	14 February 2011
Sam inherits Stella's old blue sweater.
2	"Sam's Scarf/Night Fairies"	24 February 2011
Sam loses his cuddly red scarf. (Felix makes an appearance here)
3	"Big Sam/Box Builders" "A Big Sam"	3 March 2011
Sam wishes he were bigger, after he spills all of his dog's treats on the floor. So, Stella and Sam decide to play as giants.
4	"Super Sam / Fred's Bath"	10 March 2011
Super Sam: Stella, Sam, and Ivy pretend to be superheroes. Fred's Bath: Stella and Sam try to give Fred a bath, but he never liked getting wet.
5	"Sam and the Snowman / To the North Pole"	7 April 2011
Sam and the Snowman: Sam wants to make a snowman for Fred, while he and Stella go skating on a pond. (Felix and Owen make their appearances here); To the North Pole: Stella, Sam, and Owen imagine heading towards a hill at the North Pole.
6	"Trip to China / Kite Night"	14 April 2011
Trip to China: Stella, Sam, and Felix decide to go to an East Asian country. Kite Night: Fred liked to play with Stella's kite.
7	"Trip to Africa / Laugh-A-Bit Soup"	21 April 2011
Trip to Africa: Stella, Sam, and Owen pretend to go to a Sub-Saharan part of a continent for a safari. Laugh-A-Bit Soup: When Sam stubs his right big toe, Stella decides her little brother's big toe needs some "laugh-a-bit" soup.
8	"Tree Wishes / Skippy and Sam"	28 April 2011
Tree Wishes: Sam's airplane gets stuck in a tree. In order to get it back, Stella and Sam grant three wishes. (Owen, Felix, and Ivy make their appearances here); Skippy and Sam: Sam loses his favourite skipping stone.
9	"Meadow Melody / Sam's New Boots"	5 May 2011
Meadow Melody: Stella, Sam, and Ivy play music. Sam's New Boots: Stella plays at the sandbox by pretending it to be a beach. Sam finds and wears his new red rainboots and wishes that rain would come as well.
10	"Stella From Planella / A Home for Cricket"	12 May 2011
Stella from Planella: Sam and Owen never like kiwis. So, Stella pretends to send them to outer space, in order to visit the planet Planella. A Home for Cricket: A cricket finds its way into Sam's toy truck, so Stella and Sam look for a home for it.
11	"Where's Pattycake? / Follow Me"	19 May 2011
Where's Pattycake?: Stella puts on a magic show for Owen and Sam. Later on, Owen and Sam learn some magic by trying to make Pattycake appear again to them. Follow Me: Stella, Sam, and Fred lose a ball while playing "Monkey in the Middle." In order to find it, they decide to play "Follow the leader." (Owen makes his appearance here)
12	"Stella's Circus / Stella's Storybook"	26 May 2011
Stella's Circus: Sam and Fred join in Stella's backyard circus. Stella's Storybook: Stella creates a storybook with herself and Sam as the main characters. She takes Sam on a fairytale quest. They play the roles of the Wind Queen and Sir Sam respectively.
13	"Sam and the Sky Painter / Deer Friend"	26 May 2011
Sam and the Sky Painter: Stella celebrates "Brother's Day" by making Sam morning food, a card, and his bed. They look at rainbows and play in the backyard sprinkler. Sam celebrates "Sister's Day" by making Stella a pasta necklace, a card, and a sunny, colourful sky. Deer Friend: Sam discovers a deer, while he, Stella, and Fred are playing hide and seek.

=== Season 2 (2013) ===
No.	Title	Original release date
14	"The Parrot Queen / Feathered Friends"	18 September 2013
The Parrot Queen: Sam has tongue issues while trying to say something that Owen said to him. To fix this problem, Stella takes two boys on an imaginary trip to the Jungly Jungle, in order to see the Parrot Queen. Feathered Friends: Stella, Sam, and Owen all pretend to be birds heading south for the winter.
15	"Trip to the Moon / Fred's Birthday"	14 January 2013
Trip to the Moon: Stella wants to take Sam and Owen to the Moon, in order to meet the "Man on the Moon."; Fred's Birthday: All kids celebrate Fred's fifth birthday. (Owen, Felix, and Ivy make their appearances here)
16	"Fairy Garden / Fredland"	20 January 2013
Fairy Garden: Felix has brought his invented gardening tools, in order to help Stella and Sam with their garden work. Sam decides later on that he wants to create a fairy garden. Fredland: Stella, Sam, and Owen create a theme park for Fred.
17	"Spider Games / Rainy Day Picnic"	4 February 2013
Spider Games: The children play only activity where Stella is a spider and both Sam and Owen are bugs. Rainy Day Picnic: Stella, Sam, and Owen are stuck having their lunch indoors, because of bad weather.
18	"Dragonflies / Sam's Fort"	11 February 2013
Dragonflies: Sparky the dragonfly befriends Sam by landing on Sam's shoulder. (Ivy makes her appearance here); Sam's Fort: Sam wants to create a snow home for the wild animals in a forest. (Felix makes his appearance here)
19	"Cave Kids / Sally Goose"	18 February 2013
Cave Kids: Fred gets very afraid of a thunderstorm (in violence) and hides in the basement. Sally Goose: Sam and Fred discover a lost baby Canadian Goose at their backyard. Sam names the baby goose Sally. (Felix makes his appearance here)
20	"Sam the Sock / The Land Down Under"	19 February 2013
Sam the Sock: Sam cannot find one of his socks and tries to find out where it is. The Land Down Under: Ivy has come back from her trip to Australia and shows her didgeridoo to Stella and Sam.
21	"When Stella Was Small / Invisible"	20 February 2013
When Stella Was Small: Stella shows Sam some photos of her when she was young. Invisible: Stella and Sam pretend that they are invisible.
22	"Pirates / Signs of Spring"	25 February 2013
Pirates: Stella, Sam, and Owen pretend to be pirates looking for treasure. Signs of Spring: Sam wants to plant some seeds that his grandmother gave to him. (Owen makes his appearance here)
23	"River Ride / How the West was Fun"	26 February 2013
River Ride: Stella and Sam help their kite by letting it dream about flying to the ocean. How the West was Fun: Felix chases after five chickens that escaped from their coop at Felix's ranch. (Owen makes his appearance here)
24	"Sea Dragon / Fred and Petunia"	27 February 2013
Sea Dragon: Stella and Sam imagine that a dragon is going to smash their sandcastle (Owen makes his appearance here); Fred and Petunia: Stella, Sam and Fred get to meet Petunia the dog, who belongs to Owen's grandmother.
25	"Lucky Treasure / Shipwrecked"	6 December 2013
Lucky Treasure: Sam is having a no-good day. Stella gets Sam to follow her in finding the "Lucky Jewel." (Felix makes his appearance here); Shipwrecked: Stella, Sam, and Owen pretend to be stranded on an island.

=== Specials (2014) ===
No.	Title	Original release date
Special–1	"Scarecrows and Pumpkins / Dinosaur Days"	3 March 2014
Scarecrows and Pumpkins: Sam decides that he wants to be a scarecrow for Halloween. (Owen, Felix, and Ivy makes their appearances here); Dinosaur Days: Stella, Sam, and Owen imagine that they go back in time to find a dinosaur.
Special–2	"Felix the Ghost / Monster Misunderstanding"	6 March 2014
Felix the Ghost: All kids and Fred are invited to Felix's ranch for a Halloween party. Also, they all go out trick-and-treating. Monster Misunderstanding: Stella, Sam, and Fred dress up as friendly monsters for Halloween.
Special–3	"Santa's Hat / Make It Snow"	12 March 2014
Santa's Hat: Felix has an Xmas surprise for Stella, Sam, and Owen. Make It Snow: Sam wants to see all of snow falling outside for a holiday season, like his favourite snowglobe. (Owen makes his appearance here)
