= This Beautiful City =

Film by Ed Gass-Donnelly

- Film poster
- Directed by: Ed Gass-Donnelly
- Written by: Ed Gass-Donnelly
- Produced by: Ed Gass-Donnelly; Lee Kim; Aaron Poole; David Krae; Julie Sype
- Starring: Aaron Poole; Kristin Booth; Caroline Cave; Noam Jenkins; Stuart Hughes
- Cinematography: Micha Dahan
- Edited by: Ed Gass-Donnelly
- Distributed by: 20/40 Films
- Release date: September 11, 2007
- Running time: 85 minutes
- Country: Canada
- Language: English

This Beautiful City is a 2007 Canadian drama film written, directed, produced, and edited by Ed Gass-Donnelly. It premiered at the 2007 Toronto International Film Festival and had a general theatrical release in 2008.

The film depicts the lives of five disparate characters in Downtown Toronto. Johnny (Aaron Poole) is a recovering crack cocaine addict trying to convince his prostitute girlfriend Pretty (Kristin Booth) to move with him to a new city so they can make a clean break from their old lives, while Harry (Noam Jenkins) and Carol (Caroline Cave) are a wealthy couple. Events are set in motion when Carol falls from the balcony of her condo in an apparent suicide attempt, landing just metres away from Johnny and Pretty in the alleyway below. She survives, but Peter (Stuart Hughes), a police detective, finds her and the group's lives begin to intertwine.

== Cast ==
- Aaron Poole as Johnny
- Kristin Booth as Pretty
- Caroline Cave as Carol
- Noam Jenkins as Harry
- Stuart Hughes as Peter
- Kat Germain as Zoe
- Tony Nappo as Crack
- Jefferson Mappin as Phil
- Philip Akin as Police Chief
- Christopher Cordell as Green Jacket Jock
- Brian Frank as Steve

== Soundtrack ==
The film's soundtrack includes songs by Bry Webb, Sunparlour Players, Buck 65, Jewish Legend and Sebastien Grainger, Andre Ethier, Shad, The Ghost Is Dancing, Emilie Mover and Dave MacKinnon.

== Critical reception ==
On the review aggregator website Rotten Tomatoes, the film has an approval rating of 14%, based on seven reviews. Ray Bennett of The Hollywood Reporter said, "The film is contrived but powerful. A mood of underlying dread gives each scene extra tension and its gritty portrait of how urban life at all levels can ground people down is striking."

== Awards and nominations ==
The film was nominated for four Genies at the 29th Genie Awards, including Best Actor (Poole), Best Original Song (Bry Webb, "Big Smoke"), Best Sound and Best Sound Editing.
