= Dylan Everett =

Canadian actor (born 1995)

- Born: Dylan Phillip Everett; January 24, 1995 (age 31); Waterdown (Hamilton), Ontario, Canada
- Occupation: Actor
- Years active: 2005–2022
- Military career
- Allegiance: Canada
- Branch: Canadian Army
- Service years: 2022-present
- Rank: Private
- Unit: Princess Patricia's Canadian Light Infantry

Dylan Phillip Everett (born January 24, 1995) is a Canadian soldier and former actor. He is best known for his roles in How To Be Indie (2009–2011), Wingin' It (2010–2013), Degrassi (2012–2013), and Open Heart (2015).

In 2022, he retired from acting and joined the Canadian Army. He currently serves with the Princess Patricia's Canadian Light Infantry.

== Career ==
Everett began his acting career with a recurring role as Streeter in two episodes of the Canadian children's series The Doodlebops. He appeared in the films The Devil's Mercy, Booky and the Secret Santa, Everything Is Connected, Breakfast with Scot, and For All the Marbles. He also made a guest appearance in The Dresden Files as Scott Sharpe.

In 2009, he was cast as Marlon Parks in YTV's How to Be Indie, and in 2010, he played the lead role in the Family Channel series Wingin' It. He reprised his role as Marlon Parks for a second season of How to Be Indie, which premiered in fall 2010, and also appeared in the second and third seasons of Wingin' It.

In February 2012, Everett joined Degrassi: The Next Generation as Campbell Saunders, a young hockey player struggling with anxiety and major depressive disorder. His portrayal of mental health challenges, including the character's eventual suicide, received praise from audiences and marked the first time a major character in the franchise experienced this storyline.

The same year, he appeared in the Disney Channel Original Movie Frenemies as Lance Lancaster, earning a Young Artist Award nomination for Best Performance in a TV Movie, Miniseries, Special, or Pilot for a Leading Young Actor.

From 2013 to 2015, Everett appeared in three episodes of Supernatural as a teenage Dean Winchester. In 2014, he portrayed Mark-Paul Gosselaar in Lifetime's The Unauthorized Saved by the Bell Story.

In 2016, he starred in the film Undercover Grandpa, winning Best Child Actor at the International Family Film Festival.

In 2019, he portrayed Ray Allen in Richard Bell's period drama Brotherhood.

In 2020, he appeared as Sam Sobiech, the older brother of Zach Sobiech, in the Disney+ biographical musical drama Clouds.

== Personal life ==
In 2017, Everett and his company, Shenanigans Media, were put under review by the Canadian Revenue Agency. The agency disallowed various expenses, totaling about CA$20,000, that were claimed for wardrobe, hair, and make-up, research and development expenses, and various business expenses.

== Filmography ==
=== Film ===
Year	Title	Role	Notes
2007	Breakfast with Scot	Ryan Burlington	
2008	The Devil's Mercy	Calvin	
2008	Coopers' Camera	Teddy Cooper	
2012	Frenemies	Lance Lancaster	
2014	Skating to New York	Boney Labue	
2015	Dumb Luck	Brandon	Short film; executive producer
2015	No Stranger Than Love	Alex	
2016	Undercover Grandpa	Jake Bouchard	
2018	Seven in Heaven	Kent	
2019	Brotherhood	Ray Allen	
2019	All About Who You Know	Cole	
2020	Clouds	Sam	

=== Television ===
Year	Title	Role	Notes
2005–2006	The Doodlebops	Streeter / Kid	4 episodes
2007	The Dresden Files	Scott Sharpe	Episode: "Birds of a Feather"
2007	The Latest Buzz	Big Ben	Episode: "The Cover Boy Issue"
2007	Booky and the Secret Santa	Arthur Thomson	Television movie
2007–2011	Super Why!	Wolfy	7 episodes, voice role
2008	Testees	Little Boy	Episode: "Mr. Pain and Danger Lad"
2008–2009	Dex Hamilton: Alien Entomologist	Snap	2 episodes, voice role
2009	Booky's Crush	Arthur Thomson	Television movie
2009–2011	How to Be Indie	Marlon Parks	Lead Role
2010–2012	Wingin' It	Carl Montclaire	Lead Role
2012–2013	Degrassi	Campbell Saunders	Main role (Season 12)
2012	Frenemies	Lance Lancaster	Television movie
2012	Life with Boys	Hunter	Episode: "Do You Wanna Dance With Boys"
2012	Flashpoint	Dylan	Episode: "Lawmen"
2012	What's Up Warthogs!	Randy	Episode: "East Meets West"
2013–2015	Supernatural	Teenage Dean Winchester	3 episodes
2014	Seed	Lewis	Episode: “Drool Me Once”
2014	The Unauthorized Saved by the Bell Story	Mark-Paul Gosselaar	Television movie
2014	Rookie Blue	Seth	Episode: “Exit Strategy”
2015	Open Heart	Teddy Ralston	4 episodes
2016	Annedroids	Dylan Turing	2 episodes
2017-2019	Pure	Isaac Funk	Recurring role
2018	Insomnia	Andy	8 episodes
2021	Nurses	Brad	2 episodes

== Awards ==
Year	Award	Category	Work	Result	Ref.
2008	Young Artist Award	Best Performance in a Television Series – Guest Starring Young Actor	The Dresden Files	Nominated	
2009	Young Artist Award	Best Performance in a Feature Film – Supporting Young Actor	The Devil's Mercy	Nominated	
2009	Gemini Award	Best Performance by an Actor in a Featured Supporting Role in a Dramatic Program or Mini-Series	Booky's Crush	Nominated	
2011	Young Artist Award	Best Performance by an Actor in a Featured Supporting Role in a Dramatic Program or Mini-Series	Wingin' It	Nominated	
2012	Young Artist Award	Best Performance in a TV Series — Leading Young Actor	Wingin' It	Won	
2013	Young Artist Award	Best Performance in a TV Movie, Miniseries, Special or Pilot - Leading Young Actor	Frenemies	Nominated	
2013	Canadian Screen Awards	Best Performance in a Children's or Youth Program or Series	Degrassi	Nominated	
2014	Canadian Screen Awards	Best Performance in a Children's or Youth Program or Series	Degrassi	Won	
2014	Canadian Screen Awards	Best Performance in a Children's or Youth Program or Series	Wingin' It	Nominated	
2014	Joey Awards	Young Actor (10-19) or Younger in a Made for Television/Straight to Video Feature - Leading Role	The Unauthorized Saved by the Bell Story	Nominated	
2016	International Family Film Festival	Best Child Actor	Undercover Grandpa	Won	
