= Patrick Kwok-Choon =

Canadian actor

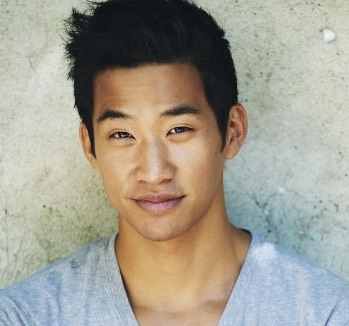
- Born: 19 November 1988 (age 38); Montreal, Quebec, Canada
- Education: Concordia University; George Brown College; Canadian Film Centre
- Occupations: Actor; director
- Years active: 2010–present

Patrick Kwok-Choon (born 19 November 1988) is a Canadian actor, best known for his recurring roles as Perry Crofte in the television adaptation of the horror Western comic book miniseries Wynonna Earp and as lieutenant commander Gen. Rhys in the CBS science fiction drama Star Trek: Discovery.

== Life and education ==
Kwok-Choon was born in Montreal, to Sino-Mauritian parents. He holds a Bachelor's of Arts & Sciences in Communication Studies from Concordia University. He subsequently moved to Toronto to attend George Brown Theatre School. Soon after graduating, he was offered a seat on George Brown Theatre School's advisory board.

In 2014, out of 600 applicants, he was one out of the ten artists offered scholarships to train at the CFC Actors Conservatory.

Kwok-Choon is a skilled martial artist in Taekwon-Do and Muay Thai. He also holds a black belt in Krav Maga.

He currently resides and works in Toronto, Ontario, and Los Angeles, California.

== Career ==
Kwok-Choon landed his first starring role immediately after graduation. He played Ferdinand in the Canadian Stage's production of The Tempest. As the show was running, he was hired again by Canadian Stage to rehearse and perform in Rock 'n' Roll by Tom Stoppard. Rock 'n' Roll was directed by Donna Feore, the spouse of Canada's screen and stage legend Colm Feore. "Rock 'n" Roll" ran in the St. Lawrence Centre for the Arts in Toronto, Ontario and the Citadel Theatre in Edmonton, Alberta.

In 2010, he played the title character in the world premiere of A Boy Called Newfoundland by Graeme Gillis at The Tarragon Theatre.

He has also performed in theatre's across the country, most notably Theatre Passe Muraille, Factory Theatre, The Toronto Fringe Festival, and in 2012 at The Princess of Wales Theatre in War Horse.

Kwok-Choon played Private David Taylor in The National Theatre of London/Mirvish co-production of War Horse. He also served as one of the main puppeteers in the show, and was trained by Handspring Puppet Companies.

Kwok-Choon's breakthrough role in television was for the Global TV's movie Befriend and Betray, directed by Ken Girotti, followed suit by the CBC Television movie Sunshine Sketches of a Little Town directed by Don McBrearty. He has also guest starred on Rookie Blue, Nikita, and Lucky 7.

Kwok-Choon's most notable role was Seth Park, a series lead on Open Heart, a 2015 American/Canadian mystery-drama television series produced by the Epitome Pictures unit of DHX Media in association with Marblemedia. It first aired on 20 January 2015, on TeenNick in the United States.

In 2015, Kwok-Choon starred as Jung in the acclaimed Soulpepper Theatre Company's play Kim's Convenience at the St Lawrence Centre for the Arts.

In 2017, Kwok-Choon landed a series recurring role as Gen. Rhys on the critically acclaimed show Star Trek: Discovery for CBS.

Since 2021, he provides the US voice of Yong Bao in the children's animated television series Thomas & Friends: All Engines Go.

In 2023, Kwok-Choon signed with the Buchwald talent agency, purportedly to attract new film roles by raising his industry profile. Soon thereafter, he was picked to play a supporting role in the Joaquin Phoenix feature Beau Is Afraid, directed by Ari Aster. The A24 surrealist film tells the story of a paranoid man who embarks on an epic odyssey to get home to his mother.

== Filmography ==
=== Film ===
Year	Title	Role	Notes
2013	Nurse 3D	EMT #1	
2014	Beethoven's Treasure Tail	Justin	Direct-to-video
2014	Bottomfeeder	Wick	Short film
2014	Steak Juice	Max	Short film
2015	My Ex-Ex	Dan	
2021	PAW Patrol: The Movie	Additional Voices (voice)	
2023	Beau Is Afraid	Theater Actor	
2025	Racewalkers	Mitchell	

=== Television ===
Year	Title	Role	Notes
2010	Covert Affairs	DCS Staffer	Episode: "Fool in the Rain"
2010	Being Erica	Young Doctor	Episode: "Physician, Heal Thyself"
2011	Befriend and Betray	Bunny Ho	Television movie
2011	Rookie Blue	Kenny Chan	Episode: "Brotherhood"
2011	The Ron James Show	Tim	Episode: "Math Problem"
2012	Sunshine Sketches of a Little Town	Mallory Tompkins	Television movie
2013	Nikita	Jason	
2013	Alice	David	
2014	The Best Laid Plans	Michael Zaleski	3 episodes
2014	Lucky 7	O	Episode: "Five More Minutes"
2015	Open Heart	Seth Park	12 episodes
2015	Backpackers	Simon	5 episodes
2015	Remedy	Officer Eddie Lee	Episode: "Looking for Satellites"
2016	Shoot the Messenger	Roger Deacon	4 episodes
2016	Man Seeking Woman	Spencer	Episode: "Wings"
2017	Some Kind of Life	Daniel	Episode: "Some Kind of Hope" and "Some Kind of Trust"
2017	Ransom	Kaus Cheng	Episode: "Say What You Did"
2017	Wynonna Earp	Perry Crofte	3 episodes
2017–2024	Star Trek: Discovery	Gen. Rhys	Recurring cast
2017	Odd Squad	Taekwon-Do Tony / Karate Karl	2 episodes
2017	Dark Matter	Ferrous Capt	Episode: "Nowhere to Go"
2018	Cardinal	Dr. Chin	Episodes: "Wombat" and "Northwind"
2019	Hudson & Rex	Sebastian Todd	Episodes: "Trial and Error" and "The Mourning Show"
2019	Private Eyes	Donnie Chow	Episode: "It Happened One Fight"
2021	SurrealEstate	Duncan	Episode: "A House Is Not a Home"
2022–2025	Thomas & Friends: All Engines Go	Yong Bao (voice)	US version
