= Kat Germain =

Canadian actress

- Born: Toronto, Ontario, Canada
- Occupation(s): Actress, writer
- Website: katgermain.com

Kat Germain is a Canadian actress and writer born in Toronto, Ontario. She graduated with a Bachelor of Arts (Theatre) from Acadia University, Wolfville, Nova Scotia. She also holds a Bachelor of Education degree from York University.

== Filmography ==
- Mary (Short film, 2003)
- This Beautiful City (2007)
- Sixty Seconds of Regret (2009)
- Small Town Murder Songs (2010)
- Dirge (2012)
- The Determinist (2014)
