= The Unauthorized Saved by the Bell Story =

- Promotional poster
- Based on: Behind the Bell by Dustin Diamond
- Written by: Ron McGee
- Directed by: Jason Lapeyre
- Starring: Sam Kindseth; Dylan Everett; Alyssa Lynch; Tiera Skovbye; Taylor Russell; Julian Works
- Composer: Shawn Pierce
- Country of origin: United States
- Original language: English

Production
- Producer: Harvey Kahn
- Cinematography: Adam Sliwinski
- Editor: Lisa Binkley
- Running time: 88 minutes
- Production companies: Front Street Pictures; Lifetime Television

Original release
- Network: Lifetime
- Release: September 1, 2014

The Unauthorized Saved by the Bell Story is a 2014 American television film that aired on Lifetime on September 1, 2014. It was directed by Jason Lapeyre, produced by Harvey Kahn and written by Ron McGee. The teleplay for the film was based on the 2009 Dustin Diamond book, Behind the Bell.

The film is the first film of the Unauthorized series, followed by The Unauthorized Full House Story, The Unauthorized Beverly Hills, 90210 Story and The Unauthorized Melrose Place Story (all in 2015).

== Background ==
In 2009, actor Dustin Diamond wrote Behind the Bell, a memoir that purported to reveal what life was like on the set of Saved by the Bell, NBC's 1989–93 Saturday morning teen sitcom.

BuzzFeed's Jarrett Wieselman reported that "hours of brand-new interviews [were] conducted for this film (obtained independently of Diamond and his book)."

== Plot ==
The Unauthorized Saved by the Bell Story delves into the experiences of six unknown young actors placed into the Hollywood spotlight, exposing the challenges of growing up under public scrutiny while trying to maintain the squeaky-clean image of their popular characters both on and off-screen.

== Cast ==
- Sam Kindseth as Dustin Diamond
- Taylor Russell as Lark Voorhies
- Dylan Everett as Mark-Paul Gosselaar
- Tiera Skovbye as Elizabeth Berkley
- Alyssa Lynch as Tiffani-Amber Thiessen
- Julian Works as Mario Lopez
- Ken Tremblett as Dennis Haskins
- Andrew Moxhamas as Peter Engel
- Kendall Cross as Sharon Harris
- Manny Jacinto as Eric

== Broadcast ==
The film premiered on September 1, 2014 on Lifetime and M3.

== Home release ==
The Unauthorized Saved by the Bell Story was released on DVD in Region 1 on November 4, 2014. and on DVD in Region 4 on April 20, 2016

DVD name	Discs	Region 1 (USA)	Region 2 (Uk)	Region 4 (Australia)	DVD special features
The Unauthorised Saved by the Bell Story	1	November 4, 2014	N/A	April 20, 2016	None

== Reception ==
The Unauthorized Saved by the Bell Story received negative reviews from critics and has a score of 33% on Metacritic.

Variety was critical of how it placed emphasis on exaggerated dramatic events rather than depicted events as they happened, saying "So it turns out The Unauthorized Saved by the Bell Story is really just Lifetime for Sharknado."

Kevin Fallon of The Daily Beast was also highly critical of the film, saying "The Unauthorized Saved by the Bell Story is really an avant-garde meta examination of Saved by the Bell. That it is a dramatic deconstruction of the worst elements of the hit '90s children's series. That the bad acting, wooden dialogue, elementary plotting, and impotent dramatic tension are actually an artistic wink at those very elements in the original series."

Pilot Viruet of The A.V. Club criticised how the film's ending hinted at a sequel, saying "The Unauthorized Saved by the Bell Story doesn't make a compelling case for a sequel. It doesn't even make a case for its own existence."

Entertainment Weekly called the film "horrendous and unmoving time-waster" and compiled a list of one-hundred elements it depicted that they found to be unconvincing. TV Guide compiled a similar list of eight elements and said that it "seemed more parody than biopic"

After the film aired, many fans of Saved by the Bell expressed their disdain for it on Twitter.
