= Brainiac 8 =

Comic book superhero

- Indigo as seen in Teen Titans/Outsiders Secret Files and Origins #1 (December 2003)

Publication information
- Publisher: DC Comics
- First appearance: Titans/Young Justice: Graduation Day #1 (July 2003)
- Created by: Judd Winick; Alé Garza

In-story information
- Alter ego: Brainiac 8
- Species: Coluan
- Team affiliations: Outsiders; Insiders; Teen Titans; Legion of Doom; Fatal Five
- Partnerships: Brainiac
- Notable aliases: Indigo
- Abilities: Superhuman strength and durability; Flight; Energy projection; Cyber mind; Regeneration

Brainiac 8 (Indigo) is a superhero character appearing in American comic books published by DC Comics. She first appeared in Titans/Young Justice: Graduation Day #1 and was created by Judd Winick and Alé Garza. Initially a heroic figure and ally of the Teen Titans and Outsiders, Indigo is later revealed to be a mole designed to eliminate opposition to the Coluan species.

Laura Vandervoort portrays Indigo in the television series Supergirl.

== Fictional character biography ==
Indigo is a Coluan originating from a distant future who comes to the 21st century badly damaged and seeking help. In the process, she tries to install her self-repairing routines into the Metal Men, but they are incapable of assisting her in maintenance. Then she turns to Cyborg, but in the process, she damages him.

Attacked by the combined forces of Young Justice and the Titans, Indigo retreats and switches into an offensive mode. Although the combined forces of the young superheroes best her, adding further damage, she is able to activate a dormant Superman robot before shutting down for repairs. When Arsenal reforms the Outsiders, he recruits the reactivated Indigo as a teammate. Her memory has been damaged, leaving her naive.

Indigo is later revealed to be Brainiac 8, a descendant of Brainiac who was designed to infiltrate the Teen Titans and kill Donna Troy to ensure Coluan dominance in the future. The Indigo the Outsiders are familiar with was a subprogram designed to endear her to them. The Indigo persona begs Shift to kill her, to which he complies.

Indigo returns in Teen Titans (vol. 3) #98 as part of Superboy-Prime's Legion of Doom. She now sports a cybernetic arm and eye, the origins of which are unexplained. In Teen Titans (vol. 3) #100, she is destroyed by Robin and Red Robin.

In 2016, DC Comics implemented another relaunch of its books called "DC Rebirth", which restored its continuity to a form much as it was prior to The New 52 reboot. Indigo appears as a member of the Fatal Five.

== Powers and abilities ==
Indigo possesses an analytical computer-like brain, enabling her to think and perceive information at great speeds. As a unique inorganic being, she can fly, project force fields, and fire blasts of energy from her eyes or hands. Her physical capabilities are far beyond human limitations. She is also able to interact with and control any technology, no matter how modern.

== Other characters with the name Indigo ==
Indigo is the name of several unrelated characters: a member of DP 7, an alias of Deep Blue, a member of Sovereign Seven, and the leader of the Indigo Tribe.

== In other media ==
- Indigo appears in the first season of Supergirl, portrayed by Laura Vandervoort. This version is a contemporary descendant of Brainiac who is imprisoned in the Phantom Zone via the maximum security prison, Fort Rozz, until she joins forces with the other inmates to escape. In subsequent appearances, she battles Supergirl before being killed by her and Martian Manhunter.
- Indigo, based on the Supergirl incarnation, appears as a playable character in Lego DC Super-Villains via the "DC TV Super-Villains" DLC pack.
