= Shania: A Life in Eight Albums =

- DVD cover
- Genre: biopic
- Directed by: Jerry Ciccoritti
- Starring: Meredith Henderson; Shenae Grimes; Megan Follows; Eric Schweig; Gordon Tootoosis
- Country of origin: Canada
- Original languages: English; French

Production
- Cinematography: Norayr Kasper
- Running time: 90 minutes

Original release
- Network: CBC
- Release: November 7, 2005

Shania: A Life in Eight Albums is a Canadian television movie, which premiered on CBC Television at 8pm on November 7, 2005. It is a biopic of Canadian country star Shania Twain, that was originally scheduled to air in October, but was delayed by the CBC labour dispute. The film was divided into eight chapters, each defined by its own colour code, style and symbolic album cover title.

== Cast ==
- Meredith Henderson ... Shania Twain
- Shenae Grimes ... Eilleen Shania Twain 13-16 yrs.
- Reva Timbers ... Eilleen Twain 8-11 yrs.
- Megan Follows ... Sharon Twain
- Eric Schweig ... Jerry Twain
- Lynne Cormack ... Mary Baily
- Darrell Dennis ... John Kim Bell
- Gordon Tootoosis ... Greey Twain
- Katie Boland ... Jill Twain, 13-24 yrs.
- Caroline Sura ... Carrie Anne Twain, 10-13 yrs.
- Courtenay Betts ... Carrie Anne Twain, 16-21 yrs.
- Adam Cabral ... Mark Twain, 5-8 yrs.
- Devon Bostick ... Mark Twain, 14 yrs.
- Aydan James Taylor ... Darryl Twain, 5-7 yrs
- Chevez Ezaneh ... Darryl Twain, 8-13 yrs.
- Tracey Toulouse ... Audrey
- Diego Klattenhoff ... Paul
- Christopher Ralph ... Mike
- Grant Aldridge ... David
- Michael Carabine ... Rick
- David Dymond ... Mike
- Jacqueline Pillon ... Lucinda

== Production and release ==
The role of Shania was shared between eight-year-old Reva Timbers, teen Shenae Grimes, and Meredith Henderson who plays Twain as an adult. They worked out shared mannerisms to improve continuity and all did their own singing. The film also stars Megan Follows and Eric Schweig as Twain's parents, and Gordon Tootoosis as her grandfather.

The film was directed by Jerry Ciccoritti and produced by Barna-Alper Productions.

Filming started on September 20, 2004 and mainly occurred in Sudbury. Additional filming was done in Huntsville, Timmins and Toronto. The film contained only brief footage of Timmins even though Twain grew up there. In 2004, Timmins mayor Vic Power publicly criticized the filmmakers for not producing the film in Timmins, calling it a "horrible miscarriage of justice". Nevertheless, the director was successful in recruiting cousins of Twain as extras, and more importantly he secured High Park House, where Twain lived with John Kim Bell, as a filming location. In a random case of good fortune, the current owner of the house provided the crew with a guitar Shania had left behind. Meredith Henderson played it in the film.

The film was not authorized by Twain and made without her participation. The film ends with a disclaimer stating so. Because of Twain's lack of participation, the producers were not allowed to use any of her songs, and thus relied on early bootlegs of Twain singing public domain songs.

The film was released on DVD on April 24, 2007.

== Awards ==
The film was nominated for two Gemini Awards in 2006. Megan Follows was nominated in the category "Best Performance by an Actress in a Featured Supporting Role in a Dramatic Program or Mini-Series". The film was also nominated in the category "Best Sound in a Dramatic Program". It also won the DGC Craft Award for "Outstanding Sound Editing - Television Movie/Mini-Series" that same year.
