= Boys and Girls (1983 film) =

1983 film

- Directed by: Don McBrearty
- Written by: Alice Munro; Joe Wiesenfeld
- Produced by: Seaton McLean; Janice L. Platt; Michael MacMillan
- Starring: Ian Heath; Megan Follows
- Cinematography: Alar Kivilo
- Edited by: Seaton McLean
- Music by: Louis Natale
- Production company: Atlantis Films
- Distributed by: CBC Television
- Release date: 1983
- Running time: 22 minutes
- Country: Canada
- Language: English

Boys and Girls is a 1983 Canadian short film directed by Don McBrearty. The film won an Oscar in 1984 for Best Short Subject. Boys and Girls is based on Alice Munro's short story of the same name, written in 1968. It is a coming of age story about a girl growing up on a farm having to accept that in her lifetime she will always be considered "only a girl".

In this film, it emphasizes the almost invisible social forces shaping children. In this case, the girl and her brother Laird become gendered adults. As farmers, fathers plant wild animals for consumption. Also in the movie, the dark, sweltering, suffocating kitchen imprisons the girl's mother and threatens to imprison her. The town itself and the remote farms are conceived in an unavoidable enclosure. The father controls a specific space in the home. When he was not working outdoors, he performed activities in the cellar. This was a white room and was illuminated by a hundred-watt light bulbs. In addition, the bright light that illuminates the space also reflects the father's desire to control. The girl helped her father water the fox and helped her father do other work. In the movie, female family members begin to force girls. Efforts to limit her behavior occur at every level of existence. For example, her grandmother tells her that "girls won't do tricks like this" (controls her movements through space) "girls put their knees together when they sit down" (controls the body). In addition, her boy said that he was useful because he was a boy. Men are more important than women.

In this film, masculinity is more important than femininity. "Female in the film" narrows the theme of the film in a sense, and at the same time expands the scope of the film, including feminism, women's movement and women's issues. The study of women in films occupies a wide and still growing space between film and feminist studies or general studies of women's studies. The history of women in the film is as long as film production. Women participated in the film from the beginning (1896), although feminist film studies started relatively late. From the early days of the late 1960s to the present, the development of feminist film criticism is not only the development of many of its theories, but also attempts to remain in the "mainstream".

== Cast ==
- Ian Heath as Laird
- Clare Coulter as Mom
- Megan Follows as Margaret
- David Fox as Dad
- Wayne Robson as Henry
- Winnifred Farrell as Grandmother

== Plot ==
The father of a girl is a fox farmer. He had silver foxes. In autumn and early winter, when their fur was good, he killed them and shaved their skins and sold them to the company. In winter, the family raised two horses until they were killed for the fox. Mike is an old and indifferent horse, and Flora is a highly stressed and nervous mare. The girl had never seen a killed horse. Curiosity forced her and her brother to watch their father shoot Mike. They saw their father take out his cigarette paper and tobacco; he shot a horse. Although her attempt to escape Mike's death is inevitable, she fears its impact on Laird. For the first time, she felt embarrassed, guarded and restrained his father. In the movie, the girl also tried to avoid her grandmother. She often used her behavior and acted in a more ladylike manner. One day, the girl and her brother Laired sat watching it. Their father took the fur out of the fox's body. Naked, slippery bodies have been collected in a bag and buried in rubbish. Living fox lived in the world that their father made for them. It is surrounded by a high fence, like a medieval town, with a door lock at night. At the end of the movie, another horse, Flora, came out of the barn. Her father shouted that she had closed the door opposite the venue so that the horse would not run away. In a one-second decision, she decided not to close the door. Her brother Laird saw her do it. Plant area escapes. But her father eventually returned to Flora after the truck. At dinner that night, Laird said his sister deliberately opened the door. Her father asked if this was true, the girl, tore up, admit it was true. The father asked her in disgust why she did so. She began to cry earnestly; she could not explain herself. Then, the father said, "It doesn't matter... She's just a girl."
