= Emilie Mover =

Canadian singer-songwriter

- Origin: Toronto, Ontario, Canada, Montreal, Quebec, Canada
- Genres: Folk, jazz, indie pop, children's
- Occupations: Singer, songwriter
- Instruments: Vocals, guitar
- Years active: 2007–present
- Labels: Balonka, Nevado, Silent Joe, Radical Sheep, Supergarage
- Website: emiliemover.com

Emilie Mover is a Canadian singer-songwriter who writes music in genres such as folk, jazz, and children's music. She has released a number of solo albums in diverse styles, and in 2013 her solo album The Stella and Sam Album won the Juno Award for Children's Album of the Year. A frequent guest artist, she performed the vocals for the Lost Girl theme song in 2010, and her music has appeared on Girls, Pretty Little Liars, and Grey's Anatomy.

== Early life ==
Emilie Mover was born in Montreal and grew up in Toronto. The daughter of jazz saxophonist Bob Mover, she was exposed to diverse genres of music at a young age. She began singing professionally with her father at the age of thirteen. At the age of fourteen she began moving back and forth between New York City and Toronto, with her parents working in both cities. At around the age of sixteen, a friend introduced her to rock music and a wider variety of songwriting styles. Prior to that, Mover recollects listening primarily to "jazz, Elvis, and Michael Jackson," as well as soul and artists such as Otis Redding. After spending time in New York City, Mover returned to Toronto, where she began composing with guitar and singing her own material.

== Music career ==
In 2007, her song "Mountainside" was included on the soundtrack of the independent film This Beautiful City. On June 5, 2008, she released her debut album Good Shake, Nice Gloves on Balonka Records. She would release a second version with bonus tracks on Marc 11, 2009.

Her second album was released on Balonka Records on March 1, 2010. Titled Le Pop Fantastique, a number of tracks from the album went on to be used in soundtracks and commercials. According to Lost and Found Radio, the Le Pop Fantastique track "Wait Till It Snows" is an "innocent folk/pop ditty" that became "popular on the Toronto club circuit." Her song "Made for Each Other", from Le Pop Fantastique, has been used in commercials for Fisher-Price toys and Fancy Feast cat food, while other tracks have been used in ads for Telus, Bounce, and BlackBerry. She released the single "I Second That Emotion" on Balonka Records in March 2010.

In December 2010, she released her album Seems So Long, with her vocals backed by members of the band Steamboat.

In 2010 she began her involvement with the soundtrack for the Canadian children's TV series Stella and Sam. While recording her album Seems So Long at Silent Joe studios, the owner of the studio asked her to sing on the demo for the Stella and Sam theme song, which was then put on the air. After a year, she was asked to help write and sing on several songs for the show's episodes, which after a second year led to the label flying her from New York to Toronto to help write the soundtrack album. According to Mover, "we had a month or two to make the record [but] we sat down and wrote all the songs in two days." On March 10, 2012, she released The Stella and Sam Album through the labels Silent Joe and Radical Sheep. It won Children's Album of the Year at the Juno Awards of 2013.

She released the children's music album The Greatest Kids Mix Tape, Vol. 1 on September 25, 2012, through Supergarage Music. As of 2012, she was on the artist roster of Zync Music Group, a licensing company based in New York. Her songs have been used in television commercials for brand such as Dodge Journey, while her song "Made for Each Other" was made the theme song for the Fisher-Price brand in 2012. She performed the vocals for the Lost Girl theme song, and her music has also appeared on shows such as Girls, Pretty Little Liars and Grey's Anatomy.

On January 1, 2013, she released the single "Don't Fence Me In" through Supergarage Music. She then released the full-length album Mighty Time on April 2, 2013, through Nevado Records. She had recorded the album in home studio spaces throughout the summer of 2012, and producers included Ian LeFeuvre among others, with Lefeuvre also contributing vocals on two tracks.

Mover called her album Emilie Mover Sings Peggy Lee (2013) a "vanity project" and produced it with her father, Bob Mover.

On October 16, 2013, she performed a show with other Nevado Records artists in Toronto. According to Michael Thomas of Exclaim! in a show review, Mover opened the show "with just her acoustic guitar and expressive voice. Her folk-pop tunes were simple but rich, weaving lyrics about love and heartbreak into nature-inspired titles like 'Mountainside' and 'Fishes.' She also played out a few covers, the nicest being a pretty rendition of Jorge Ben's 'Chove Chuva.'"

On October 24, 2013, she released the single "Cursed." She released the EP Mighty Time - The Sandro Sessions in February 2014, which according to New Canadian Music features "an inventive reworking of cuts from the album by Mover and ace producer Sandro Perri (Polmo Polpo)." A music video for the track "Ride With The Tide" was also released, with Mover supporting the release with a tour of Ontario and Quebec.

As of 2013, Mover continued to be based in Toronto while maintaining an apartment in Brooklyn, New York.

In 2018 her cover of the song "The Wanderer", and her songs "Walkin' Through" and "In Your View" were featured in Toyota, Bose, and PetSmart commercials respectively.

== Awards and nominations ==
Year	Award	Nominated work	Category	Result
2013	Juno Awards	The Stella and Sam Album	Children's Album of the Year	Won

== Critical reception ==
Mighty Time met with a positive reception in the music press. NOW Toronto praised her vocals and wrote that "the varied arrangements bring out the whimsy in her songwriting: reverby synth-pop brushes up against piano ballads, upbeat pop rock tunes, psych-soul and hints of doo-wop." BeatRoute Magazine described the album as containing "coy jazz-pop, astute psychedelic bossa nova, laid-back lounge music, bouncy folk-pop, serene Icelandic chord stretches and plenty of fragments that I can’t even name... Mover’s awareness of how the pieces of our musical past relate to one another has here resulted in a wonderful, self-aware record."

Seems So Long was named one of Sarah Green's top 10 albums of 2010 in a list compiled for NOW Toronto. Opined Greene, Mover "has a natural, casual delivery that manages to wrap confession in mystery... this has a loose, late-night feel, best for enjoyment with a stiff drink in your hand."

== Discography ==
=== Solo albums ===
Albums by Emilie Mover
Year	Album title	Release details
2008	Good Shake, Nice Gloves	Released: Jun 5, 2008; Label: Balonka Records; Format: CD, digital download
2010	Le Pop Fantastique	Released: Mar 1, 2010; Label: Balonka Records; Format: CD, digital download
2010	Seems So Long	Released: Dec 28, 2010; Label: Emilie Mover/Supergarage Music; Format: CD, digital download
2012	The Stella and Sam Album	Released: Mar 10, 2012; Label: Silent Joe / Radical Sheep; Format: CD, digital download
2012	The Greatest Kids Mix Tape, Vol. 1	Released: Sep 25, 2012; Label: Supergarage Music; Format: Digital download
2013	Mighty Time	Released: Apr 2, 2013; Label: Nevado Records; Format: CD, digital download
2013	Emilie Mover Sings Peggy Lee	Released: Oct 1, 2013; Label: Self-released; Format: Digital download

=== Extended plays ===
EPs by Emilie Mover
Year	Album title	Release details
2014	Mighty Time - The Sandro Sessions	Released: February 2014; Label: Nevado Records; Format: Digital download

=== Singles ===
Incomplete list of songs by Emilie Mover
Year	Title	Album	Release details
2007	"Mountainside"	This Beautiful City	Saved By Vinyl (2007)
2010	"Made for Each Other"	Le Pop Fantastique	Balonka Records (Mar 1, 2010)
2010	"I Second That Emotion"	Single only	Balonka Records (May 25, 2010)
2013	"Don't Fence Me In"	Single only	Supergarage Music (Jan 1, 2013)
2013	"Ride With the Tide"	Mighty Time	Nevado Records / Fontana North (April 2, 2013)
2013	"Cursed"	Single only	Self-released (Oct 24, 2013)

=== Guest appearances ===
Selected songs featuring Emilie Mover
Year	Single name	Primary artist(s)	Album	Release details
2012	"Central Park" (ft. Emilie Mover)	Central Park	Non-album single	Indie Joe (Jun 21, 2012)
2013	"The Wanderer" (ft. Emilie Mover)	Lost Girl	Lost Girl; Themes, Vol. 1	Prodigy Pictures (Oct 10, 2013)
2013	"Lost Girl Theme" (ft. Emilie Mover)	Lost Girl	Lost Girl; Themes, Vol. 1	Prodigy Pictures (Oct 10, 2013)

=== Soundtracks ===
Selected soundtrack credits for Emilie Mover
Yr	Release title	Film format	Role
2007	This Beautiful City	Feature film	Contributed track "Mountainside"
2010	Score: A Hockey Musical	Feature film	Co-wrote track "Best Friends"
2010	Stella and Sam	TV series	Vocals on entire soundtrack
2011	It's Okay, That's Love	TV series	Contributed track "Just Where I Belong"
2013	Lost Girl Themes, Vol. 1	TV series	Featured vocalist

== See also ==
- List of singer-songwriters
