= Donovan Brown =

Canadian actor

- Born: Toronto, Ontario, Canada
- Occupation: Actor
- Years active: 2015–present

Donovan Brown is a Canadian actor.

== Career ==
=== Early work ===
Donovan got his start in television with a recurring role on the TeenNick series Open Heart.

== Filmography ==
Year	Title	Role	Notes
2015	Open Heart	Drew	3 episodes
2016	Grandpa Was Here	Don	Joey Award Win "Young Actor in a film 18-20 Years Old" Young Artist Awards Win "Best Performance by a Teen Actor" Young Entertainer Awards Nomination "Best Young Actor 16-21"
2018	The Rick Mercer Report		
2019	Star Trek: Discovery	Andre Haynes 'Science Trainee'	
2019	In the Black		Pilot Short Film
2021	Hero Dog: The Journey Home	James	
2021	Hudson & Rex	Brayden Deller	Episode: "Sudden Death"
