= Frenemies (film) =

2012 television film directed by Daisy von Scherler Mayer

- Promotional poster
- Based on: Frenemies by Alexa Young
- Written by: Dava Savel; Wendy Weiner; Jim Krieg
- Directed by: Daisy von Scherler Mayer
- Starring: Bella Thorne; Zendaya; Mary Mouser; Nick Robinson; Stefanie Scott
- Countries of origin: United States; Canada
- Original language: English

Production
- Producers: Les Morgenstein; Bob Levy
- Cinematography: Michael Storey
- Editor: Adam Weiss
- Running time: 86 minutes
- Production companies: Alloy Entertainment; Coin Flip Productions

Original release
- Network: Disney Channel
- Release: January 13, 2012

Frenemies is a 2012 American-Canadian teen comedy-drama anthology television film based on the novel of the same name by Alexa Young. It features an ensemble cast starring Bella Thorne, Zendaya, Stefanie Scott, Nick Robinson, Mary Mouser (in a dual role) and features Connor Price, Jascha Washington (in his final film role) and Dylan Everett. The film follows three pairs of teenage friends that go from friends to enemies and back again: two girls who run a fashion blog, a boy and his dog, and a tomboy who trades places with an uptown girl who looks like her twin. The film was directed by Daisy Mayer and written by Dava Savel, Wendy Weiner, and Jim Krieg. The Disney Channel Original Movie premiered on January 13, 2012, in the United States and Canada.

== Plot ==
Set in the fictional town of Waterbury, New Jersey, the story takes place involving three intertwined stories told by teenage friends who all go to the same school. The first story focuses on how a kid and a dog who are best friends become frenemies and how they become best friends again. The second story focuses on how two BFFs become total frenemies over a senior editor job. The third and final story focuses on two lookalikes who swap lives with each other, similar to The Princess and the Pauper.

=== Jake and Murray ===
The first story focuses on a teenaged science whiz at Waterbury High School named Jake Logan (Nick Robinson) who is best friends with his dog, Murray (Winston). A popular girl named Julianne (Stefanie Scott) tries to come between Jake and Murray, but the dog seemingly sees through her ruse. Determined to get another "A" in science, Julianne hatches a plan to get Murray out of her way for good, thus freeing up Jake's time to work on a science project with Julianne. Stealing Jake's national prize certificate in molecular astrophysics from NASA, Julianne drenches it in her perfume and drops it through the mail slot in Jake's front door. As Julianne expected, Murray mistakes the sabotaged NASA certificate for one of the love letters Julianne has been giving Jake, and attempts to flush it down the toilet. Jake is able to save his certificate but becomes angry and yells at Murray to go away. Murray follows his command and runs away from home, but is found by Savannah O'Neal (Mary Mouser), a classmates of Jake's who loves to skateboard and has a crush on Jake. Savannah shelters Murray at her house while Jake begins to worry that Murray might not return, though he manages to finish his and Julianne's science project. At school, Jake attempts to dress cool to impress his classmates, but then discovers Julianne's scheme to frame Murray. Jake refuses to give Julianne the project, and Savannah uses the opportunity to expose Julianne's longstanding ruse of using people to get A's. Murray appears, knocking over Julianne and the science project, and though the project is destroyed, Jake is happy to see Murray and they become best friends again.

=== Avalon and Halley ===
The second story focuses on two teens, Avalon (Bella Thorne) and Halley (Zendaya) who co-created a web magazine called "GeeklyChic." In the school library, Halley receives a call from her and Avalon's favorite New York City publishing company, Burns Publications, run by the stunning Cherie St. Claire (Jessalyn Wanlim). Halley believes her fashion-forward older brother Kendall (Jascha Washington) is playing a prank on her until she sees him doing a service project out on the school grounds and realizes the call from Cherie is real. Cherie invites Halley and Avalon to the publishing company's headquarters in Manhattan, where she tells them she likes their web magazine and offers to buy it, though only one of them can be senior editor, because Cherie believes the quality of the writing will improve. Cherie asks Avalon and Halley to each write a cover article so she can judge who writes best and make that writer the senior editor. Back at school, Avalon encounters classmate Walker (Connor Price), who puts her in contact with a French singer named Jean Frank. Halley and Avalon decide to interview Jean after his first American sold-out concert and become frenemies in the process. In a surprise twist, Jean reveals to the girls that he is actually Johnny Frankewski, an American, and Halley and Avalon then decide they will co-write the article and share the byline. The move angers Cherie who decides not to hire either Avalon or Halley, but the TV show "Teens Now" picks up the article about Johnny and changes his image, revealing his ruse as a singer from Paris. "Teens Now" also broadcasts the GeeklyChic blog for their audience, leading to the web magazine going global, and Avalon and Halley make up as best friends again.

=== Savannah and Emma ===
The third and final story of the film focuses on Savannah and Emma Reynolds (Mary Mouser), teenage alter egos who trade places because they each believe the other's life is better. Savannah is a tomboy who loves skateboarding and lives with her dad and three brothers. She has a crush on Jake and attends Waterbury High School with him, Avalon, Halley, and Julianne. Emma is a girly-girl who comes from a wealthy family and attends private school. Savannah and Emma meet at the mall and, each thinking the other has the better life, decide to trade places (with persuasion from Halley and Avalon). Of course, they soon discover the realities of each other's not-glamorous lives. Emma (disguised as Savannah) gets a date with Jake and during the date Emma starts acting romantic, which angers Savannah (disguised as Emma). Emma then becomes upset upon learning Savannah went out with Lance (Dylan Everett), Emma's boyfriend, and the two argue until Savannah storms off. Later, at Emma's birthday ball, Emma (still disguised as Savannah) dumps Lance and the real Emma is overjoyed when she hears this, because she has been trying to break up with Lance and never had the courage to do so. The girls forgive each other and switch lives once more, and Avalon and Halley lead everyone in a lively dance to "Pose" (by Stefanie Scott) as the film ends.

== Cast ==
- Bella Thorne as Avalon Greene
- Zendaya as Halley Brandon
- Mary Mouser as:
  - Savannah O'Neal
  - Emma Reynolds
- Nick Robinson as Jake Logan
- Stefanie Scott as Julianne Bryan
- Connor Price as Walker
- Jascha Washington as Kendall Brandon (final film role)
- Dylan Everett as Lance Lancaster
- Kathryn Greenwood as Lisa Logan
- Doug Murray as Roger O'Neal
- Clive Walton as Walt Reynolds
- Natalie Radford as Jacqueline Reynolds
- Jessalyn Wanlim as Cherie St. Claire
- Jesse Bostick as Emmett
- Julian Kennedy as Owen
- Stewart Arnott as Pemberly
- Tom H. Lariviere (credited as Tom Hughes) as Jean-Frank

== Songs ==
- "Pose" by Stefanie Scott and Carlon Jeffery
- "Top of the World" by The Pussycat Dolls

== Production ==
The film was shot from April 11 to May 16, 2011, in Richmond Hill, Ontario, Canada. It was filmed at Our Lady Queen of the World Catholic Academy with current grade 11 drama students as extras.

== Reception ==
It premiered on Friday, January 13, 2012, on Disney Channel and garnered 4.207 million viewers. In the United Kingdom and Ireland it had 394,000 viewers.

== Accolades ==
Year	Award	Category	Recipient	Result	Ref.
2013	Young Artist Award	Best Performance in a TV Movie, Miniseries, Special or Pilot - Leading Young Actor	Dylan Everett	Nominated	
2013	Young Artist Award	Best Performance in a TV Movie, Miniseries, Special or Pilot - Leading Young Actress	Bella Thorne	Nominated	
2013	Young Artist Award	Best Performance in a TV Movie, Miniseries, Special or Pilot - Leading Young Actress	Zendaya	Nominated	

== Broadcast ==
Worldwide the movie aired on Disney Channel. In Canada it premiered on January 13, 2012, and in the United Kingdom and Ireland it premiered on March 2, 2012. It aired in Australia and New Zealand on April 13, 2012, in South Africa on April 28, 2012, and in the Philippines, Singapore, and Malaysia on June 4, 2012.
