= Open Heart (TV series) =

- Genre: Drama; Mystery
- Created by: Linda Schuyler
- Developed by: Ramona Barckert; Brendan Gall; Miklos Perlus; Chris Pozzebon
- Written by: Chris Pozzebon; Ramona Barckert; Brendan Gall; Scott Oleszkowicz
- Starring: Karis Cameron; Justin Kelly; Cristine Prosperi; Tori Anderson; Jenny Cooper; Jeffrey Douglas; Sasha Clements; Nahanni Johnstone; Kevin McGarry; Dylan Everett; Mena Massoud; Patrick Kwok-Choon; Jacob Neayem; Darrell Dennis; Donovan Brown; Sam Efford
- Country of origin: Canada
- Original language: English
- No. of seasons: 1
- No. of episodes: 12

Production
- Production locations: Toronto, Ontario, Canada
- Running time: 22 minutes
- Production companies: Epitome Pictures; marblemedia; Nickelodeon Productions

Original release
- Network: YTV
- Release: January 20 – March 31, 2015

Open Heart is a 2015 Canadian mystery-drama television series produced by the Epitome Pictures unit of DHX Media in association with Marblemedia. It aired simultaneously on January 20, 2015, on YTV in Canada and TeenNick in the United States. In June 2015, Canada's ABC Spark acquired the rights to air reruns of the show.

== Premise ==
16 year old Dylan Blake, the rebellious daughter of a fractured family of doctors, is now on probation. Instead of changing her ways, She uses her community service stint as a youth volunteer at her family's hospital to secretly investigate the disappearance of her father, who went missing six months earlier. During her investigation, she uncovers dark secrets in her family's closet go way deeper than her father's disappearance.

== Cast ==
=== Main cast ===
- Karis Cameron as Dylan Blake, the main protagonist of the show who is determined to find her missing father.
- Justin Kelly as Wesley "Wes" Silver, a volunteer at Open Heart and Dylan's love interest.
- Cristine Prosperi as Mikayla Walker, a volunteer at Open Heart and a good friend of Dylan's.
- Tori Anderson as London Blake, a doctor at Open Heart and Dylan's sister.
- Jenny Cooper as Jane Blake, a doctor at Open Heart and Dylan and London's mother.

=== Recurring cast ===
- Jeffrey Douglas as Richard Blake, Dylan's missing father.
- Sasha Clements as Rayna Sherazi, one of Dylan's old friends from her "bling ring".
- Nahanni Johnstone as Veronica Rykov, the woman last seen with Dylan's father and is related to his disappearance.
- Elena Juatco as Scarlet McWhinnie, a doctor at Open Heart whose stunning beauty often leaves her razor sharp medical skills underestimated by others
- Kevin McGarry as Timothy "Hud" Hudson, a doctor at Open Heart and an ex-Army medic.
- Dylan Everett as Theodore "Teddy" Ralston, Dylan's ex-boyfriend from her "bling ring".
- Mena Massoud as Jared Malik, supervisor over the volunteers at Open Heart and Mikayla's love interest
- Patrick Kwok-Choon as Seth Park, a doctor at Open Heart and London's boyfriend.
- Jacob Neayem as Donald "Donny" Mara, a gang member and stepcousin of Seth.
- Darrell Dennis at Det. Darryl Goodis, the main detective in the case of Richard Blake's disappearance.
- Donovan Brown as Drew, one of Dylan's old friends from her "bling ring".
- Sam Efford as Alex, one of Dylan's old friends from her "bling ring".

== Episodes ==
No.	Title	Directed by	Written by	Original release date	Prod. code	U.S. viewers (millions)
1–2	"Last Things First"	Stefan Brogen	Chris Pozzebon	January 20, 2015	101-102	0.951
After a break in goes wrong with her friends, 16 year old Dylan Blake is forced to spend her summer in her family's prestigious hospital, but decides to use her time for more pressing matters.
3	"Unknown Soldier"	Stefan Brogen	Chris Pozzebon	January 27, 2015	103	0.814
Dylan confronts Hud about the watch her father gave him. Trying to balance her life, London grows closer to Seth. Meanwhile, Jane tries to come clean about her relationship with Dom
4	"Private Eyes"	Stefan Brogen	Chris Pozzebon	February 3, 2015	104	0.619
5	"In Plain Sight"	Stefan Brogen	Chris Pozzebon	February 10, 2015	105	0.726
6	"Lockdown"	Stefan Brogen	Chris Pozzebon	February 17, 2015	106	0.590
7	"Connected"	Stefan Brogen	Chris Pozzebon	February 24, 2015	107	0.680
8	"Ancient History"	Stefan Brogen	Chris Pozzebon	March 3, 2015	108	0.782
9	"Password"	Stefan Brogen	Chris Pozzebon	March 10, 2015	109	0.861
10	"Paying for It"	Stefan Brogen	Chris Pozzebon	March 17, 2015	110	0.618
11	"Trust Fund"	Stefan Brogen	Chris Pozzebon	March 24, 2015	111	0.461
12	"Time Out of Mind"	Stefan Brogen	Ramona Barckert & Chris Pozzebon	March 31, 2015	112	0.548
As the summer begins come to a close, so as Dylan's probation, she races against the clock to find answers and uncover the final surprise surrounding her father's disappearance.
