= Nahanni Johnstone =

Canadian actress

- Occupation: Actress
- Years active: 1992–Present
- Known for: Booky and the Secret Santa

Nahanni Johnstone is a Canadian actress.

She was nominated for the Gemini Award for Best Performance by an Actress in a Featured Supporting Role in a Dramatic Program or Mini-Series for her performance in Booky and the Secret Santa (2007).

== Awards and nominations ==
TableCAPTION
Year	Award	Category	Result	Ref.
2008	Gemini Awards	Best Performance by an Actress in a Featured Supporting Role in a Dramatic Program or Mini-Series (Booky and the Secret Santa)	Nominated	
2017	London Film Award	Best Supporting Actress (Yellow Fever)	Won	

== Filmography ==
=== Film ===
- 1992: The Cutting Edge – Gita
- 1998: The Real Blonde – Young Woman
- 2000: The Doghouse – Maureen Summer
- 2002: Infested – Mindy
- 2002: Love in the Time of Money – Marianne Jones
- 2005: Love Thy Neighbor – Female Customer
- 2013: Real Gangsters – Beauty #1
- 2014: Revenge of the Green Dragons – Beach Reporter
- 2017: Yellow Fever – Li Bradford
- 2022: Disconnected (short) – Claudia Dalton

=== Television ===
Nahanni Johnstone television credits
Year	Title	Role	Notes	Ref.
1993	Counterstrike	Barmaid / Brenda	Episode: "Betrayed"	
1993	Family Pictures	Jill	TV movie	
1995	Death Junction	Suzanne	TV movie	
1995	The Man in the Attic	Leslie	TV movie	
1995	Sugartime	Carlene Delfano	TV movie	
2000	Spin City	Stewardess	1 episode	
2000	Law & Order: Special Victims Unit	Helen Katisch	Episode: "Entitled"	
2000	Third Watch	Nicole	7 episodes	
2002	Adventure Inc.	Victoria Bratton	1 episode	
2007	Booky and the Secret Santa	Anne Westover	TV movie	
2008	Never Cry Werewolf	Christie	TV movie	
2011	Suits	Sales Agent	1 episode	
2011	Lost Girl	Dominatrix	1 episode	
2012	Witchslayer Gretl	Thorne	TV movie	
2012	An Officer and a Murderer	Mary Elizabeth Harriman	TV movie	
2013	Orange Is the New Black	Marina	1 episode	
2013	Nikita	Sarah Graham	1 episode	
2015	Minority Report	Dr. Hineman	1 episode	
2019	Law & Order: Special Victims Unit	Vanessa Parker	Episode: "End Game"	
2019	Ransom	Genevieve Nair	1 episode	
2020	Blue Bloods	Allie Roth	1 episode	
2023	A Bestselling Kind of Love	Olivia Michaels	TV movie	
