= Booky Makes Her Mark =

2006 Canadian television film

- Written by: Bernice Thurman Hunter; Joe Wisenfeld
- Directed by: Peter Moss
- Starring: Megan Follows; Tatiana Maslany; Erik Knudsen; Sarah Allen; Stuart Hughes
- Countries of origin: United States; Canada
- Original language: English

Production
- Producer: Patrick Cassavetti
- Cinematography: Norayr Kasper
- Running time: 89 minutes

Original release
- Release: 30 April 2006

Booky Makes Her Mark is a made-for-TV movie that is based on the books by Bernice Thurman Hunter, starring Tatiana Maslany. The family film also features Megan Follows, Roberta Maxwell and Lally Cadeau. Filmed in Hamilton, Ontario, Canada and set in Toronto, it features a young and diverse cast of Canadian actors and actresses.

== Plot ==
Beatrice "Booky" Thomson is a spunky 15-year-old who dreams of becoming a great writer despite the odds. Life in Toronto during the 1930s are hard ones for Booky's family. Parents Thomas and Francy are barely able to eke out a living for themselves and their children Willa, Arthur, and Booky. But irrepressible Booky, with her big imagination and even bigger plans, seems able to tackle anything.

When her new school teacher, Mr. Jackson, inspires her to become a writer, Booky chooses to pursue it as a career, until she lets some well-meaning advice from a great Canadian author shatter her dreams.

Following a short stay at Aunt Aggie's Muskoka farm to quell a bout of bronchitis, Booky returns home to resume the usual joys and trials of growing up. She starts the Deanna Durbin fan club with her best friends Ruthie and Gladys, rebuffs the advances of her brother's trouble-making friend Georgie, celebrates her 16th birthday with disastrous results, and falls for Gloria's ex-boyfriend Lorne. Then one day, she decides to enter the local newspaper's essay writing contest and what happens after that nearly turns Booky's life upside down.

== Cast ==
- Tatiana Maslany - Booky (Bernice Thomson)
- Megan Follows - Frances Thomson
- Stuart Hughes - Thomas Thomson
- Erik Knudsen - Arthur Thomson
- Sarah Allen - Willa Thomson
- Roberta Maxwell - Aunt Aggie
- Ephraim Ellis - Georgie
- Kate Todd - Gloria
- Mike Lobel - Lorne
- Lauren Collins - Ada-May
- Stacey Farber - Audrey
- Philip Riccio - Roy-Roy
- Sarah Todd - Raggy Rachel
- Lally Cadeau - Lucy Maud Montgomery
- Barry MacGregor - Grandpa Cole
- Steven McCarthy - Mr. Jackson
- Nicky Guadagni - Mrs. MacDonald
- Leanna Brodie - School Secretary
- Neil Foster - Doctor

== Accolades ==
- 2006, Directors Guild of Canada nomination for 'DGC Craft Award'
- 2006, Directors Guild of Canada nomination for 'DGC Team Award'
- 2007, Canadian Society of Cinematographers nomination for 'Best Cinematography in TV Drama'
- 2007, Gemini Awards nomination for 'Best Performance by an Actor in a Featured Supporting Role in a Dramatic Program or Mini-Series'
- 2007, Gemini Awards nomination for 'Best Performance by an Actress in a Featured Supporting Role in a Dramatic Program or Mini-Series'
- 2007, Gemini Awards nomination for 'Best Photography in a Dramatic Program or Series'
