= Cracked (Canadian TV series) =

- Genre: Police crime drama
- Created by: Tracey Forbes; Calum de Hartog
- Starring: David Sutcliffe
- Opening theme: "Weighty Ghost" by Wintersleep
- Country of origin: Canada
- Original language: English
- No. of seasons: 2
- No. of episodes: 21

Original release
- Network: CBC Television
- Release: January 8 – November 25, 2013

Cracked is a Canadian police crime drama television series which aired from January 8 to November 25, 2013 on CBC Television. The series was created by writer Tracey Forbes and Toronto Emergency Task Force officer Calum de Hartog, and was executive produced by Peter Raymont and Janice Dawe of White Pine Pictures. It premiered on January 8, 2013, and aired new episodes through November 25, 2013.

== Premise ==
Cracked follows the newly formed Psych Crimes Unit within a Canadian police department led by ETS officer Detective Aidan Black (David Sutcliffe). This team of police officers and psychiatrists respond to bizarre and frightening crises and solve cases involving emotionally disturbed criminals, victims, and witnesses.

== Cast ==
- David Sutcliffe as Detective Aidan Black, who was involved in two fatal shootings that were deemed clean and justifiable in the following inquiries, after multiple psych evaluations, which were inconclusive but did show symptoms of post-traumatic stress disorder. After suffering from a public breakdown he is reassigned to the new Psych Crimes and Crisis Unit and partnered with Dr. Ridley, a partner without a badge or gun whom he doesn't yet trust, but is determined to. Unbeknown to him, his supervisor, Inspector Caligra, asks Dr. Ridley to diagnose him and she diagnoses him as not broken, but "Cracked". Before the start of the show Aidan was in a relationship with Detective Liz Liette; in the beginning of the first season Aidan is still struggling with the break-up. In episodes 4–5 the two sleep together leading Aidan to believe they are getting back together. Liz tells him there is no future for them but Aidan says it isn't true because Liz still has his key; Liz replies that someone is going to have to clean up the apartment when he blows his brain out. At the end of episode 5 she leaves the key at his apartment.
- Stefanie von Pfetten as psychiatrist Dr. Daniella Ridley (season 1), helping to design the Psych Crimes and Crisis Unit with Inspector Caligra after leaving her prestigious position at St. Stephen's Hospital following a relationship and break-up with the Chief of Psychiatry, Dr. McCray. Following Detective Black's reassignment, she is asked to keep an eye on him. Daniella struggles with keeping an eye on Aidan for Caligra up until episode 10 when during a hearing Aiden finds out. Aidan feels completely betrayed and requests a new partner. For the rest of the season Daniella is Poppy Wisnefski's partner until the last episode where they began to mend the relationship. In episode 6 it is revealed Daniella had a son at 16 that she gave up for adoption, something she has been dealing with in therapy. In the first episode of season 2 it is revealed that Daniella has made contact with her son and would not be returning.
- Luisa D'Oliveira as Detective Poppy Wisnefski, a young, cynical, impatient officer whose motives for being on the team are career-related as it is "one step up to homicide". She is the daughter of a police officer and only has brothers as siblings. She has spent her life trying to prove she can be as tough as her brothers.
- Dayo Ade as Leo Beckett, a compassionate psychiatric nurse from inner-city emergency rooms and urban mental hospitals. He is Detective Wisnefski's partner.
- Karen LeBlanc as Inspector Diane Caligra; with Dr. Ridley, she set up the unit and oversees its operation solving any case where an emotionally disturbed person is involved. After becoming concerned with Aiden Black and recognising he has symptoms of PTSD but not wanting to waste him as a police officer, she transfers him to the unit and asks Dr. Ridley to "watch" over him.
- Mayko Nguyen as Homicide Detective Liz Liette, Aidan's long-term ex-girlfriend and colleague. After getting upset at how emotionally distant he was and his emotional inaccessibility, she moved out.
- Paul Popowich as Dr. Sean McCray, Chief of Psychiatry at St. Stephen's Hospital, where Dr. Ridley used to work. Previously he and Dr. Ridley were in a dysfunctional relationship.
- Brooke Nevin as psychiatrist Dr. Clara Malone (season 2), a new addition to the Psych Crimes unit.

== Production ==
The series was announced in May as part of CBC's autumn and winter schedule, which featured only three new shows and Murdoch Mysteries moving from Citytv to CBC. Principal photography began in Toronto in July 2012. The theme music is performed by Wintersleep and is titled "Weighty Ghost". The show was selected as a MIPCOM Hot Pick in October 2012.

On April 2, 2013, CBC renewed Cracked for a second season, which began airing September 30, 2013, with the season premiere entitled "Swans". On May 22, 2013, Brooke Nevin was unveiled as the new psychiatrist, Dr. Clara Malone, who would join the cast for Season Two.

On March 17, 2014, CBC cancelled the series due to government budgetary cuts after losing the Hockey Night in Canada rights to Rogers Media and Sportsnet.

== Episodes ==
=== Season 1 (2013) ===
Season 1 stars David Sutcliffe as Detective Aidan Black, a seasoned officer who transfers from the Emergency Task Force to the Psych Crimes and Crisis Unit after struggling with post-traumatic stress disorder; and Stefanie von Pfetten as psychiatrist Dr. Daniella Ridley, who leaves her prominent position at a downtown hospital to partner with the police. Black and Ridley are the lead team in a newly formed Psych Crimes Unit where they are joined by Poppy Wisnefski, a young cop cynical beyond her years, played by Luisa D'Oliveira, and a compassionate psychiatric nurse, Leo Beckett, played by Dayo Ade. Together they combine police investigative skills and psychiatric insight to resolve crises and solve crimes.

No. overall	No. in season	Title	Directed by	Written by	Original release date	Viewers (millions)
1	1	"How the Light Gets In"	Tim Southam	Tracey Forbes	January 8, 2013	564,000
2	2	"Fallen"	Phil Earnshaw	Dennis Foon & Janet MacLean	January 15, 2013	TBA
3	3	"What We Can't See"	Bruce McDonald	Tracey Forbes	January 22, 2013	TBA
4	4	"White Knight"	Phil Earnshaw	Alan McCullough	January 29, 2013	TBA
5	5	"No Traveller Returns"	Brett Sullivan	Bruce M. Smith	February 5, 2013	TBA
6	6	"Spirited Away"	Don McBrearty	Sandra Chwialkowska	February 12, 2013	TBA
7	7	"Rocket Man"	Bruce McDonald	Patrick Tarr	February 19, 2013	TBA
8	8	"The Thump Parade"	Anne Wheeler	Patrick Tarr	February 26, 2013	TBA
9	9	"Cherry Blossoms"	Jim Donovan	Alan McCullough & Alexandra Mircheff	March 19, 2013	TBA
10	10	"Inquest"	Steve DiMarco	Alan McCullough	March 26, 2013	436,000
11	11	"Night Terrors"	Don McBrearty	Sandra Chwialkowska	April 2, 2013	TBA
12	12	"Old Soldiers"	Steve DiMarco	Bruce M. Smith	April 9, 2013	TBA
13	13	"The Light in Black"	Don McBrearty	Matt Doyle & Tracey Forbes	April 16, 2013	526,000

=== Season 2 (2013) ===
Brooke Nevin joined the cast for season 2 as psychiatrist Dr. Clara Malone.

No. overall	No. in season	Title	Directed by	Written by	Original release date	Viewers (millions)
14	1	"Swans"	Bruce McDonald	Bruce M. Smith	September 30, 2013	809,000
15	2	"The Price"	Don McBrearty	David Barlow	October 7, 2013	TBA
16	3	"The Valley"	Don McBrearty	Ellen Vanstone	October 14, 2013	TBA
17	4	"Faces"	Bruce McDonald	Patrick Tarr	October 21, 2013	TBA
18	5	"The Hold Out"	Norma Bailey	Karen McClellan	October 28, 2013	TBA
19	6	"Ghost Dance"	Jim Donovan	Laurie Finstad-Knizhnik	November 4, 2013	TBA
20	7	"Hideaway"	Sudz Sutherland	Patrick Tarr & Ellen Vanstone	November 18, 2013	TBA
21	8	"Voices"	Jim Donovan	Bruce M. Smith	November 25, 2013	TBA

== Broadcast ==
On October 4, 2012, White Pine Pictures announced that they secured the program sale of the series to Astral's Québec fiction channel Séries+ pre-MIPCOM. On January 15, 2013, they announced the sale of the series by German distributor BetaFilm to Canal+ in France. Cracked went to air on the newly branded free TV channel, D8, Fridays at 8.45pm, commencing April 19, 2013.

The first season premiered in the United States on ReelzChannel cable on August 30, 2013 with the second season picked up for 2014. Sister network Ovation (American TV channel) acquired US syndication rights for their "Mystery Alley" channel on the Ovation NOW streaming service app.
