= An Officer and a Murderer =

2012 Canadian television film

- Genre: Drama
- Written by: Keith Ross Leckie
- Directed by: Norma Bailey
- Starring: Gary Cole; Laura Harris; Rossif Sutherland
- Music by: Jono Grant; Robert Carli
- Country of origin: Canada
- Original language: English

Production
- Executive producers: Tom Patricia; Mary Young Leckie
- Producer: Lena Cordina
- Cinematography: Boris Mojsovski
- Running time: 85 minutes
- Production company: Solo Films

Original release
- Release: July 21, 2012

An Officer and a Murderer is a Lifetime television film about the crimes committed by Russell Williams, a former Colonel in the Royal Canadian Air Force. The movie aired in the United States of America on July 21, 2012 at 8pm. An Officer and a Murderer has received six award nominations, winning two of these awards.

== Plot ==
Russell Williams (Gary Cole), known to friends and family as 'Russ', is a Colonel in the Royal Canadian Air Force. He is promoted to base commander at Canadian Forces Base Trenton, and celebrates the promotion with his wife, Mary Elizabeth Harriman (Nahanni Johnstone), at her charity fundraiser. Both Russ and Mary are well-respected members of their small community of Tweed, Ontario. The night after the charity event, a hooded man breaks into a young girl's room while she is away with family, stealing underwear, bras, and a picture of the girl at the beach. This intruder is given a face in the next break-in. It is revealed that Russell is the perpetrator after he steals underwear and sex toys, and hides in a woman's closet while she returns to her house at night. Russ leaves her a message on her computer screen before he exits the house, using poor grammar in an attempt to throw any potential investigators off his trail.

Throughout the movie, Russ becomes increasingly daring and his crimes escalate from breaking and entering, to sexual assault, to rape, and eventually murder. With the town having labelled the responsible party as the "Tweed Creeper", Russ takes every opportunity to express how disgusting he thinks this man's actions are. Nobody is suspicious of the Trenton base commander.

Detective Jennifer Dobson, a local police officer, teams up with Toronto Detective Nick Gallagher - who is on exchange in Tweed - to investigate the series of breaking and entering cases. They follow Russ's trail through many assaults, as well as the murder of Corporal Marie-France Comeau, a non-commissioned member (NCM) under the Colonel's command. The detectives' big break comes when Dobson is driving around on patrol and spots a vehicle parked in a field next to a house. She does a quick investigation, and when she finds nobody home, she moves on. When the woman who lived in that house, Jessica Lloyd, is reported missing and the SUV is gone, the police launch an investigation into the vehicle. Through the use of traffic checkpoints, the police match the treads of the tires to the vehicle of Colonel Williams. The detectives devise a plan to call Russ in with the story of needing his help in the cold case. He willingly complies and agrees to answer some routine questions. Russell removes his boots in the hallway, and while he is in the interrogation room with Detective Gallagher, Detective Dobson runs his boot prints. When they match those found on the scenes of the crimes, two teams are deployed to search Russell's Tweed home and his office at the Trenton Base. The panties and bras are found, alongside a staggering amount of photo and video evidence, and a record of all the undergarments he had stolen.

In the interrogation room, Gallagher switches from small talk and easy questions to a more serious and invasive line of questioning. Eventually, Dobson joins Gallagher and they inform Russell Williams of all the evidence they found against him. The detectives coax a confession out of the Colonel and he is stripped of his title and his medals. His wife, his friends, his remaining victims, and his community are left to deal with the repercussions, as well as the 3000 military personnel who were under his command.

== Cast ==
- Gary Cole as Colonel Russell Williams
- Laura Harris as Detective Jennifer Dobson
- Rossif Sutherland as Detective Nick Gallagher
- Nahanni Johnstone as Mary Elizabeth Harriman
- Catherine Disher as Captain Catherine Novak
- Zoé De Grand Maison as Beth Pelway
- Micheline Marchildon as Corporal Marie-France Comeau
- Lisa Ciara as Jessica Lloyd
- David Ferry as Charlie Straw

== Reception ==
=== Awards ===
An Officer and a Murderer was nominated for:

- Canadian Screen Awards Best Performance by an Actor in a Leading Role in a Dramatic Program or Mini-Series (Gary Cole) (2014)
- Canadian Screen Awards Best Original Music Score for a Program (Jono Grant and Robert Carli) (2014)
- Canadian Screen Awards Best Writing in a Dramatic Program or Mini-Series (Keith Ross Leckie) (2014)
- Directors Guild of Canada Team award Television Movie/Mini-Series (Production Crew) (2013)

An Officer and a Murderer won:

- Canadian Cinema Editors Awards Best Editing in Television Movie or Mini-Series (Ron Wisman) (2013)
- Directors Guild of Canada Craft Award Picture Editing - Television Movie/Mini-Series (Ron Wisman) (2013)

=== Reviews ===
There are mixed reviews regarding An Officer and a Murderer. The film's writer, Keith Ross Leckie, defended the movie against critics claiming it was insensitive and ignored the facts in favour of sensationalizing the story. Leckie told The Star that they were very careful in how they went about the making of An Officer and a Murderer, recognizing the sensitive material. The release of the movie was delayed for a year in an attempt to distance the recreation from the actual events. Police, victims, and families of victims were all contacted before writing began, and Leckie went to the houses where the attacks occurred so he could tell the story with as much accuracy and empathy as possible.

The Huffington Post published an article written by a contributing writer, boldly titled Why Canadians Should Reject The Russell Williams Crime Movie, in which they proclaim that it is a sensationalistic movie created solely for profit, and that it "stains the good honour of Canadian women and men in uniform." While citing all the inaccuracies and dramatizations throughout the film, Huffington Post professes that the only parts recreated with precision accuracy are the assaults, rapes, and murders of his victims, forcing them to relive the horrors they are trying to leave behind.
