= Bernice Thurman Hunter =

Canadian children's writer (1922–2002)

- Born: November 3, 1922; Toronto, Ontario
- Died: May 29, 2002 (aged 79); Toronto, Ontario
- Occupation: Author
- Writing career
- Genre: Children's Literature

Bernice Thurman Hunter, CM (November 3, 1922 – May 29, 2002) was a Canadian children's author.

== Life and career ==
Born in Toronto, Hunter spent her adult years as an Eaton's employee, and did not publish her first book, That Scatterbrain Booky (1981), until she was a grandmother. Her stories are recalled fondly by her fans for showing an accurate and enjoyable portrayal of Toronto through the Depression and War years. She maintained a connection with her roots, and frequently returned to the areas she wrote about to give public readings of her works.

Hunter experienced a multitude of health challenges in her later years, however she continued writing. In 2001, she was made a Member of the Order of Canada. While the honour was awarded posthumously, she was informed of the award shortly before her death.

Her first series of books has been adapted into a film called "Booky Makes Her Mark".

== Selected works ==
- That Scatterbrain Booky (1981)
- With Love from Booky (1983)
- A Place for Margaret (1984)
- As Ever, Booky (1985)
- Margaret in the Middle (1986)
- Lamplighter (1987)
- Margaret on Her Way (1988)
- The Railroader (1990)
- The Firefighter (1991)
- Hawk and Stretch (1993)
- Amy's Promise (1995)
- Janey's Choice (1996)
- Two Much Alike (1997)
- It Takes Two (1999)
- The Girls They Left Behind (2000) Published posthumously; Red Maple Award for Fiction shortlist 2007

== Other ==
An award held by Swansea Public School for writing was named after Hunter.
