= Anne Winters (actress) =

American actress and singer (born 1994)

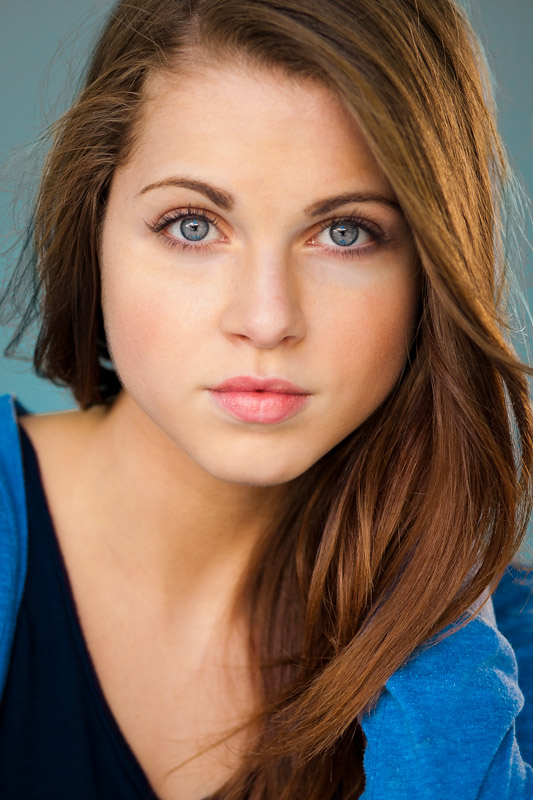
- Winters in 2012
- Born: June 3, 1994 (age 32); Dallas, Texas, U.S.
- Education: Prestonwood Christian Academy
- Occupations: Actress; singer
- Years active: 2009–present
- Known for: Zac & Mia; Tyrant; Sand Castles; 13 Reasons Why

Anne Winters (born June 3, 1994) is an American actress and singer. She has played roles in the FX's series Tyrant as Emma Al-Fayeed, ABC's series Wicked City as Vicki Roth, and Netflix's series 13 Reasons Why as Chlöe Rice. She also starred in the films Sand Castles (2014), Pass the Light (2015), The Bride He Bought Online (2015), Mom and Dad (2017), and Night School (2018).

In 2017, she began starring as cancer patient Mia Phillips in go90's drama series Zac & Mia, for which she won the 2018 Daytime Emmy Award for Outstanding Lead Actress in a Digital Daytime Drama Series. In the 2022 third season of the Hulu science fiction series The Orville, she played the role of Ensign Charly Burke.

== Early life ==
Anne Winters was born in Dallas, Texas, to Karen and Harry Winters. She grew up in nearby Lewisville. Winters was educated at Prestonwood Christian Academy, a private Baptist school in Plano.

When she was ten years old, Winters sang a solo at the American Airlines Center to a crowd of over 24,000 people. She originally planned to attend Southern Methodist University for her college education, but chose instead to relocate to Los Angeles in order to pursue her acting career.

== Career ==
Winters made her film debut as Young Kathleen in the straight-to-DVD film A Christmas Snow. She then appeared in the straight-to-DVD film Cooper and the Castle Hills Gang. In 2013, she guest starred in the Disney Channel sitcom Liv and Maddie as Kylie Kramer, appearing in the episode "Steal-A-Rooney". From 2013 to 2014, Winters had a recurring role as Kelsey in the ABC Family/Freeform drama series The Fosters.

From 2014 to 2016, Winters starred in the regular role of Emma Al-Fayeed in the drama series Tyrant, created by Gideon Raff for the FX network. She was credited as a guest star during Tyrant's second season, appearing in only four of the 13 episodes, and continued her role in the third season. Winters starred in a leading role in the 2014 independent drama film, Sand Castles, directed by Clenét Verdi-Rose, opposite actors Jordon Hodges and Clint Howard. She won the Leonardo da Vinci Horse Award for Best Ensemble Cast at the MIFF Awards with her co-stars. Also in 2014, Winters starred as Kelly Decker in the action film Fatal Instinct.

In 2015, she appeared as Gwen in the faith-based film Pass the Light, directed by Malcolm Goodwin. She also starred as Avery Lindstrom in the Lifetime television film The Bride He Bought Online, directed by Christine Conradt. That same year, she was cast as Vicki Roth in ABC's crime drama series Wicked City. Winters co-starred as Valerie York in the NBC pilot sequel to the teen drama film Cruel Intentions, alongside the film's original star Sarah Michelle Gellar. Winters won Best Supporting Actress at the 2016 Nice International Film Festival for her role in the drama film The Tribe.

In 2017, she appeared opposite Nicolas Cage and Selma Blair in the horror comedy film Mom and Dad, directed by Brian Taylor. Since 2017, Winters has had a lead role in the AwesomenessTV and go90 drama series Zac & Mia, portraying teenage cancer patient Mia Phillips. She won the 2018 Daytime Emmy Award for Outstanding Lead Actress in a Digital Daytime Drama Series for her performance in the role.

Winters portrayed Chlöe Rice, the new head cheerleader and "it" girl of Liberty High in a recurring role of the second, third, and fourth seasons of Netflix's drama series 13 Reasons Why, and appeared in the 2018 comedy film Night School, directed by Malcolm D. Lee. She has been cast in the ABC drama series Grand Hotel.

In 2022, she appeared in season 3 of The Orville, as new season crew member Charly Burke.

== Personal life ==
In May 2024, Winters announced she was receiving treatment for malnutrition.

== Filmography ==
=== Film ===
Year	Title	Role	Notes
2009	Gloria	Student	
2010	A Christmas Snow	Young Kathleen	
2011	Cooper and the Castle Hills Gang	Lauren	
2014	Sand Castles	Lauren Daly	
2014	Fatal Instinct	Kelly Decker	
2015	Pass the Light	Gwen	
2015	The Bride He Bought Online	Avery Lindstrom	
2016	The Tribe	Sarah	
2017	Reality High	Holly	
2017	Mom and Dad	Carly Ryan	
2018	Night School	Mila	
2019	Countdown	Courtney	
2026	Atlas King		

=== Television ===
Year	Title	Role	Notes
2010	Summer Camp	Beth	TV movie
2013	Liv and Maddie	Kylie Kramer	Episode: "Steal-a-Rooney"
2013–2014	The Fosters	Kelsey	Recurring role (season 1), 6 episodes
2014–2016	Tyrant	Emma Al-Fayeed	Main role (season 1); special guest (seasons 2–3)
2015	Wicked City	Vicki Roth	Main role
2016	Cruel Intentions	Valerie York	Main role; unsold TV Pilot
2017–2019	Zac & Mia	Mia Phillips	Main role
2018–2020	13 Reasons Why	Chlöe Rice	Recurring role (season 2–4)
2019	Grand Hotel	Ingrid	Main role
2022	The Orville	Charly Burke	Main role (season 3)

== Awards and nominations ==
Year	Association	Category	Nominated work	Result	Ref.
2014	Leonardo da Vinci Horse Awards	Best Ensemble Cast	Sand Castles	Won	
2016	Nice International Film Festival	Best Supporting Actress	The Tribe	Won	
2018	Daytime Emmy Awards	Outstanding Lead Actress in a Digital Daytime Drama Series	Zac & Mia	Won	
