= Zoé De Grand Maison =

Canadian actress

- Born: May 3, 1995 (age 31); Montreal, Quebec, Canada
- Other names: Zoé De Grand-Maison, Zoé De Grand'Maison
- Occupation: Actress
- Years active: 2012–present

Zoé De Grand Maison (born May 3, 1995), often credited as Zoé De Grand'Maison or Zoé De Grand-Maison, is a Canadian actress. She is known for her roles of Gracie Johanssen in the television series Orphan Black and Ashley in the movie Bad Hair Day. She recently played Evelyn Evernever on The CW teen drama series Riverdale.

== Acting career ==
=== 2012–present: Orphan Black and Bad Hair Day ===
In 2012, Grand Maison made her first television appearance on Saving Hope on CTV Television Network and NBC, where she played Tara. That same year, she played Beth Pelway in the movie An Officer and a Murderer on Lifetime which premiered on July 21, 2012.

In 2013 she played Emily Moreland for four episodes of the Canadian television series Played In May 2014 she made a special appearance in the series Motive in which she played Sasha King. In 2014, Grand Maison joined the recurring cast of the series Orphan Black portraying Gracie Johanssen.

In March 2015 she played the role of Nicolette Green in the television series Murdoch Mysteries on CBC Television. That same year, she played the antagonistic character Ashley in the movie Bad Hair Day. She also guest starred in an episode of the series Rookie Blue on ABC, where she played Hayley Hill. In 2015, she co-starred in the movie A Christmas Horror Story where she played Molly Simons.

In June 2015, Grand Maison joined the main cast of the film Adam's Testament alongside fellow Canadian actor Luke Bilyk. The movie premiered on April 18, 2017, in Canada. In September 2015, Grand Maison joined the main cast of the film Morning After, playing the role of Teegan when it premiered in Spring 2016.

Grand Maison portrayed the leading role in the telefilm Pregnant At 17 from NB Thrilling Films. The telefilm is about Sonia Clifton (Josie Bissett), a veterinarian who discovers that her husband is having an affair. She becomes obsessed with finding out more about the woman, Chelsea (Grand Maison), and she soon learns that she is 17 and pregnant. Empathizing with the soon-to-be teen mother, Sonia becomes Chelsea's unlikely champion. Released on February 21, 2016 on Lifetime.

== Filmography ==
=== Films ===
Year	Title	Role	Notes
2015	A Christmas Horror Story	Molly Simon	
2015	Bloom	Ashley	Short film
2017	Adam's Testament	Katia	
2017	Morning After	Teegan	Short film
2019	Cleverly Disguised	Jennifer	Short film
2023	Organ Trail	Abigale "Abby" Archer	
2023	The Good Word	Sister Cronkwright	Short film

=== Television ===
Year	Title	Role	Note
2012	Saving Hope	Tara	"Pilot" (Season 1, Episode 1)
2012	An Officer and a Murderer	Beth Pelway	Television film (Secondary role)
2013	Played	Emily Moreland	Guest role, 4 episodes
2014–15, 2017	Orphan Black	Gracie Johanssen	Recurring role, 17 episodes
2014	Motive	Sasha King	"Abandoned" (Season 2, Episode 9)
2015, 2024	Murdoch Mysteries	Nicolette Green / Constance Cavendish	Guest role; 2 episodes
2015	Bad Hair Day	Ashley Mendlebach	Television film (Secondary role)
2015	Rookie Blue	Hayley Hill	"Perfect Family" (Season 5, Episode 13)
2016	Pregnant at 17	Chelsea	Television film (Co-lead role)
2017	Sea Change	Naomi	Television film (Secondary role)
2017	Stickman	Liv	Television film (Lead role)
2018	Wayne	Jenny	Guest role, 2 episodes
2018–2020, 2023	Riverdale	Evelyn Evernever	Recurring role (season 3-4,7)
2020	Fortunate Son	Destiny	Main cast
2022	Ezra	Somber Wales	Guest role, 2 episodes
2025	Hudson & Rex	Carley Wannamaker	Episode: "Bee-Deviled"
2025	The Summer I Turned Pretty	Agnes	Recurring role

== Awards and nominations ==
Year	Award	Work	Category	Result	Ref.
2015	Young Artist Award	Motive	Best Performance in a TV Series - Guest Starring Young Actress 17-21	Won	
2015	Young Artist Award	Orphan Black	Best Performance in a TV Series - Recurring Young Actress 17-21	Nominated	
2017	International Christian Film & Music Festival	Adam's Testament	Best Supporting Actress	Won	
