= Kicking Blood =

2021 Canadian horror comedy film

- Film poster
- Directed by: Blaine Thurier
- Written by: Blaine Thurier; Leonard Farlinger
- Produced by: Jennifer Jonas
- Starring: Alanna Bale; Luke Bilyk; Benjamin Sutherland
- Cinematography: Jonathon Cliff
- Edited by: Matt Lyon
- Music by: Ohad Benchetrit; Justin Small
- Production company: New Real Films
- Release date: September 10, 2021 (TIFF)
- Running time: 80 minutes
- Country: Canada
- Language: English

Kicking Blood is a 2021 Canadian horror comedy film directed and co-written by Blaine Thurier. The film stars Alanna Bale as Anna, a vampire who decides to try to quit her addiction to blood after meeting and falling in love with Robbie (Luke Bilyk), a human recovering alcoholic.

The cast also includes Benjamin Sutherland, Rosemary Dunsmore and Vinessa Antoine.

The film was shot in Sudbury, Ontario in early 2021.

It premiered at the 2021 Toronto International Film Festival on September 10, followed by screenings at the 2021 Cinéfest Sudbury International Film Festival and the 2021 Vancouver International Film Festival.

== Reception ==
On the review aggregator website Rotten Tomatoes, 74% of 27 critics' reviews are positive, with an average rating of 6.3/10. The website's consensus reads: "Kicking Blood overcomes evident budget limitations with solid acting and a vampire story that has an emotionally impactful twist."
