= Brittany Bristow =

Canadian actress

- Born: February 8, 1990 (age 35); Toronto, Ontario, Canada
- Occupation: Actress
- Years active: 2002–present
- Spouse: Dustin Keating (m. 2022)

Brittany Bristow (born 8 February 1990) is a Canadian actress. She was born in Toronto, Ontario, to film producers Leif and Agnes Bristow. Since 2002, Bristow has appeared in many films and series. She is known for starring in several Hallmark Channel movies.

== Filmography ==
Year	Title	Role	Notes
2002	Perfect Pie	Patsy (age 10)	
2003	Profoundly Normal	Margaret as Teen	TV movie
2003	Blizzard	Erin Scott-Pierce	
2003	Missing	Shayla Andrews	TV series, 1 episode
2010	Made... The Movie	Charlotte	TV movie
2010	Sophie & Sheba	Sophie	starring role
2010–2011	Baxter	Tassie Symons	TV series, 12 episodes
2011	Murdoch Mysteries	Laura MacFarlane	TV series, 1 episode
2013	Wavelengths	Gemma	short, starring role
2014	Saul: The Journey to Damascus	Johanna	
2015	A Dangerous Arrangement	Carrie	TV movie
2016	Private Eyes	Sherry Gibbs	TV series, 1 episode
2016	The Apostle Peter: Redemption	Susanna	
2016	Preshift		TV series, 1 episode
2016	Coming In	Kelly	TV series, 3 episodes
2016	Cherry	Lucy	short, starring role
2017	Kiss and Cry	Riley Allison	
2017	Love Blossoms	Kimmy Spencer	TV movie
2017	Good Witch	Marinda	TV series, 1 episode
2017	Rising Suns Webisodes	Sloan Camden	TV mini series, 1 episode
2017	Christmas Next Door	Elaine Stewart	TV movie
2017	Petrichor	Kelsey	short, starring role
2018	Royal Matchmaker	Britney	TV movie
2018	Autopsy	The Subject	short, starring role
2018	Love on Safari	Ally Botsman	TV movie
2018	Killer High	Jeanne	TV movie
2018	Christmas at the Palace	Jessica	TV movie
2018	No Sleep 'Til Christmas	Nicola	TV movie
2019	Love, Romance, & Chocolate	Marie Gruben	TV movie
2019	Holiday Date	Brooke Miller	TV movie, starring role
2020	The Marijuana Conspiracy	Jane	
2020	Shadowtown	Maya	starring role
2020	Rising Suns	Sloan Camden	TV mini series, 6 episodes
2021	Love in Whitbrooke	Amber Verdon	TV movie, starring role
2021	Dancing Through the Shadow	Louise Turner	
2021	Wrapped Up in Love	Ashley	TV movie, starring role
2022	The Story of Love	Ruby	TV movie, starring role
2022	Hudson & Rex	Melissa	TV series, 1 episode
2022	A Tail of Love	Bella Channing	TV movie, starring role
2022	Home for a Royal Heart	Erin Close	TV movie, starring role
2022	Hearts of Stars		TV series, 2 episodes
2023	The Love Club	Nicole Everett	TV series, 4 episodes, starring role
2023	Just Jake	Amber Gibson	TV movie, starring role
2023	A Safari Romance	Megan Henry	TV movie, starring role
2024	The Christmas Chocolatier	Charlotte Dobler	TV movie, starring role
