= Cameron Palatas =

American actor (born 1994)

- Born: Cameron Lewis Palatas; February 23, 1994 (age 31); San Pedro, California, U.S.
- Occupation: Actor
- Years active: 2007–present
- Relatives: Nick Palatas (brother)

Cameron Lewis Palatas (born February 23, 1994) is an American actor. He is best known for playing a younger Gideon Malick in Agents of S.H.I.E.L.D. and his film roles in Pass the Light (2015) and F the Prom (2017).

== Early life ==
Cameron Lewis Palatas was born in San Pedro, California, on February 23, 1994. He is the younger brother of fellow actors Nick Palatas and Philip Palatas. His first acting job was with his family, including his brother Nick, as extras in a Walmart commercial.

== Career ==
Palatas had a recurring role in the 2013 mockumentary series Zach Stone Is Gonna Be Famous. He has since had minor roles in several Disney shows such as iCarly, A.N.T. Farm, and I Didn't Do It. In 2015, he starred in the Christian drama film Pass the Light, in which he played a high school senior who runs for U.S. Congress. That same year, he starred in the Lifetime film Double Daddy. In 2016, he starred in the third season of Agents of S.H.I.E.L.D. as a younger version of Gideon Malick, reprising the role in the seventh season of the show in 2020. He also starred in the 2017 comedy film F the Prom by Benny Fine alongside Danielle Campbell, Madelaine Petsch and Joel Courtney.

== Personal life ==
Palatas dated actress Ariel Winter around 2012, which attracted some controversy as he was 18 years old and she was 14 years old. Winter's mother filed statutory rape charges against Palatas in 2012, but the charges were soon dropped when Winter's sister Shanelle Workman became Winter's legal guardian and alleged that their mother had been physically and emotionally abusive, culminating in Winter receiving emancipation in 2015.

== Filmography ==
=== Films ===
Year	Title	Role	Notes
2008	Gator Armstrong Plays with Dolls	Mighty	Short film
2008	How My Dad Killed Dracula	Mark	Short film
2009	A Prayer for the Umpire	Billy Brandice	Short film
2011	A Bag of Hammers	Young Alan	Uncredited
2014	With You	Young Johnny	Short film
2015	Pass the Light	Steve Bellafiore	
2015	Double Daddy	Connor	
2017	F the Prom	Kane	

=== Television ===
Year	Title	Role	Notes
2007	On the Lot	Professor Loser's Son / Trever in Anklebiters	2 episodes
2008	What's the Word?	Himself	Episode: "Johnny Kapahala: Back on Board"
2008	3-Minute Game Show	Himself	Game show
2008	October Road	Young Ray Cataldo	Episode: "Stand Alone by Me"
2008	iCarly	Student in the Hallway	Episode: "iOwe You"
2012	A.N.T. Farm	Jared	2 episodes
2013	Zach Stone Is Gonna Be Famous	Andy Stone	12 episodes
2014	The Haunted Hathaways	Skyler McPiece	Episode: "Haunted Crushing"
2014	I Didn't Do It	Tom Bigham	Episode: "The New Guy"
2015	Point of Honor	Charles Storey	Television film
2016, 2020	Agents of S.H.I.E.L.D.	Young Gideon Malick	2 episodes

=== Web ===
Year	Title	Role	Notes
2011	First Day 2: First Dance	Dustin	6 episodes

=== Video games ===
Year	Title	Role	Notes
2007	TimeShift	S.S.A.M.	Voice
