= Night School (2018 film) =

2018 comedy film directed by Malcolm D. Lee

- Theatrical release poster
- Directed by: Malcolm D. Lee
- Written by: Kevin Hart; Harry Ratchford; Joey Wells; Matt Kellard; Nicholas Stoller; John Hamburg
- Produced by: Kevin Hart; Will Packer
- Starring: Kevin Hart; Tiffany Haddish; Rob Riggle; Romany Malco
- Cinematography: Greg Gardiner
- Edited by: Paul Millspaugh
- Music by: David Newman
- Production companies: HartBeat Productions; Will Packer Productions
- Distributed by: Universal Pictures
- Release date: September 28, 2018 (United States)
- Running time: 111 minutes
- Country: United States
- Language: English
- Budget: $29 million
- Box office: $103.1 million

Night School is a 2018 American buddy comedy film directed by Malcolm D. Lee, produced with Will Packer and Kevin Hart, written by Hart, Harry Ratchford, Joey Wells, Matt Kellard, Nicholas Stoller and John Hamburg, and starring Hart, Tiffany Haddish, Rob Riggle, and Romany Malco with supporting roles done by Taran Killam, Megalyn Echikunwoke, Al Madrigal, Mary Lynn Rajskub, Keith David, Anne Winters, Fat Joe, Ben Schwartz, Yvonne Orji, and Bresha Webb. The story follows a group of adults who set out to earn their GEDs. The film was released in the United States by Universal Pictures on September 28, 2018, grossed over $103 million worldwide and received negative reviews from critics.

== Plot ==
In 2001, high school student Teddy Walker drops out when he cannot concentrate during a crucial test.

17 years later in 2018, Teddy sells barbecue grills while dating a wealthy woman named Lisa; a careful financial strategy makes him appear wealthier than he actually is. However, his life falls apart just as he learns that he is going to inherit control of the store when the current manager retires. Proposing to Lisa in the shop, Teddy accidentally triggers an explosion when a champagne cork pops open a gas tank. The manager takes the insurance from the explosion and promptly moves to Florida.

Now jobless, Teddy learns from his best friend Marvin that he could theoretically get a job at his financial investment firm, but only if he has a GED. Teddy goes to his old high school, intending to charm the new principal into giving him the relevant qualification only to discover the principal is Stewart, who Teddy bullied when he was at school. Fortunately, Teddy can enroll in night school that semester, taught by the unorthodox Carrie, but finds himself still frustrated by his old concentration issues. At the same time, he tells Lisa he already has the job working for Marvin, while secretly working at a local fast food restaurant to give himself some income.

As the class struggles to cope, Teddy convinces them to help steal the test answers. When Carrie realizes what happened, he is expelled after taking the blame. He returns to make a genuine appeal to Carrie that he wants to do better. He is allowed back if he gets tested for learning disabilities. They determine that he has dyslexia, dyscalculia, and various processing issues. She is able to devise new systems to help him cope and he soon settles into night school while genuinely befriending his classmates.

As the last class is on prom night, Teddy suggests they attend too. He is confronted by Lisa who Stewart brought to the school that night under the pretense of corporate sponsorship to improve the school. Hurt that Teddy was lying to her, Lisa breaks up with him, prompting Teddy to give up on night school and the GED.

Following the incident, Teddy is visited by Carrie and Stewart with the latter apologizing to Teddy, realizing he crossed a line. Carrie convinces him to return for the GED. Although he does not pass with his classmates, he refuses to give up and continues to persevere and completes it on his fifth attempt.

At graduation, Teddy makes a speech for the night school students about how they all prove that second chances are possible, witnessed by Lisa. Afterwards, Teddy apologizes to her for lying, re-introducing himself. He asks her out, and she agrees to support him financially while he seeks work.

Before the credits, a party is held after graduation. Stewart interrupts the party, proclaiming that it is "his house" before pulling off some epic dance moves to prove it.

== Cast ==
- Kevin Hart as Theodore "Teddy" Walker, a man who worked as a barbecue grill salesman and has to work on his concentration and focus. Back in high school, he was a school bully and an arrogant popular jerk liar.
- Tiffany Haddish as Carrie Carter, Teddy's unorthodox night school teacher.
- Rob Riggle as Mackenzie “Mac”, a dimwitted but friendly man who is one of Teddy's classmates. He has worked in a removal company for thirty years and wants a GED so that he can move into a management position.
- Romany Malco as Jaylen, one of Teddy's classmates. He was fired from a factory position when he was replaced by a robot and is now looking for a GED to improve his career options.
- Taran Killam as Stewart, the school's strict principal who was the school nerd that Teddy bullied when he was there.
- Megalyn Echikunwoke as Lisa King, a wealthy woman and Teddy's fiancée who doesn't know at first that Teddy is enrolled in the night school.
- Al Madrigal as Luis, a waiter who is fired due to his reaction to Teddy's false claim and ends up as one of his classmates.
- Mary Lynn Rajskub as Theresa, a hardworking mom with several kids who got pregnant in high school and is now trying to earn her GED.
- Keith David as Gerald Walker, Teddy's father.
- Anne Winters as Mila, a deadpan hipster from a wealthy family whose parents force her to get her GED at the night-school class after she was caught with drugs in her locker.
- Ben Schwartz as Marvin, Teddy's best friend and an investment adviser who wants to give his pal a job but can't until Teddy passes his GED.
- Fat Joe as Bobby, a prison inmate and one of Teddy's classmates via the internet.
- Bresha Webb as Denise Walker, Teddy's sister and Gerald's daughter.
- Yvonne Orji as Maya, Lisa's friend.
- Donna Biscoe as Gladys Walker, Denise and Teddy's mother and Gerald's wife.
- Tilda Del Toro as Luis' wife
- Bryan Gael Guzman as Luis' son
- Isabella Ribeiro-Sonera as Luis' daughter
- Courtney Jackson Emerson as Jaylen's Wife

== Production ==
Principal photography began in Atlanta, Georgia in September 2017.

== Reception ==
=== Box office ===
Night School grossed $77.3 million in the United States and Canada, and $25.8 million in other territories for a total worldwide gross of $103.1 million, against a production budget of $29 million.

In the United States and Canada, Night School was released alongside Smallfoot, Little Women and Hell Fest, and was projected to gross $25–31 million from 3,010 theaters in its opening weekend. The film made $9.5 million on its first day, including $1.35 million from Thursday night previews, on par with Hart's Ride Along 2 ($1.26 million in 2016). It went on to debut to $28 million, finishing first domestically (although Smallfoot earned more worldwide) and marking the best opening weekend for a comedy in 2018. It made $12.5 million in its second weekend and $7.8 million in its third, finishing fourth and sixth, respectively.

=== Critical response ===
On Rotten Tomatoes, the film holds an approval rating of 27% based on 143 reviews, with an average rating of 4.3/10. The website's critical consensus reads, "Night School's funny stars and seemingly promising setup add up to a disappointingly scattershot comedy whose laughs are largely held in detention." On Metacritic, the film has a weighted average score of 43 out of 100, based on 30 critics, indicating "mixed or average reviews". Audiences polled by CinemaScore gave the film an average grade of "A−" on an A+ to F scale, and PostTrak reported filmgoers gave it 3.5 out of 5 stars.

Variety's Owen Gleiberman wrote the film "wants to be a nasty sitcom but spends too much time playing it safe" and wrote, "Night School has a handful of laughs, but it's a bloated trifle that, at 111 minutes, overstays its welcome." For IndieWire, David Elrich gave the film a "D" grade, stating "Kevin Hart can be funnier than he is in this joyless and interminable comedy, but he no longer seems interested in trying."

== Home media ==
Night School was released digitally on December 11, 2018, and on 4K UHD Blu-Ray, Blu-Ray and DVD on January 1, 2019.

== Cancelled television series ==
On January 10, 2020, it was reported that NBC was developing a TV series based on the movie. The pilot was written by Christopher Moynihan and produced by Universal Television, Hartbeat Productions and Will Packer Productions. On February 27, 2020, it was announced that Shanola Hampton was cast as Carrie Dawes, originally played by Haddish in the movie. Ian Gomez, Collette Wolfe, James Earl and Joe Massingill were additions announced on March 2, 2020. Josh Segarra was announced as Teddy Walker, the role originally played by Hart in the movie. On December 11, 2020, NBC announced that the pilot would not be moving forward.

== See also ==
- List of black films of the 2010s
