= Pass the Light =

- Theatrical release poster
- Directed by: Malcolm Goodwin
- Written by: Victor Hawks
- Produced by: Angie Canuel; Victor Hawks; Malcolm Goodwin
- Starring: Cameron Palatas; Dalpre Grayer; Alexandria DeBerry; Milena Govich; Colby French; Lawrence Saint-Victor; Jon Gries; Anne Winters
- Cinematography: Travis Hoffman
- Edited by: Rosanne Tan
- Music by: Pancho Burgos-Goizueta
- Production company: Vision Vehicle Productions
- Distributed by: DigiNext Films
- Release date: February 6, 2015 (United States)
- Running time: 113 minutes
- Country: United States
- Language: English
- Budget: $1 Million
- Box office: $6,234,654

Pass the Light is a 2015 American faith based film, directed by Malcolm Goodwin and written by Victor Hawks. The film stars Cameron Palatas, Dalpre Grayer, Alexandria DeBerry, Milena Govich, Colby French, Lawrence Saint-Victor, Jon Gries, and Anne Winters. It was released in the United States by DigiNext Films in a limited release on February 6, 2015.

== Premise ==
Pass the Light is the story of Steve Bellafiore (Cameron Palatas), a 17-year-old high school senior who decides to run for Congress in order to protect the faith that he so loves.

== Cast ==
- Cameron Palatas as Steve Bellafiore
- Alexandria DeBerry as Jackie
- Dalpre Grayer as Willy
- Milena Govich as Anne
- Colby French as Pete
- Lawrence Saint-Victor as Trevor
- Jon Gries as Franklin Baumann
- Charlie DePew as Wes
- Anne Winters as Gwen
- Ruby Lewis as Gina Winters
- Samantha Figura as Helen Baumann

== Production ==
The film was written by Broadway actor and screenwriter Victor Hawks; it reportedly took him less than a week to write the screenplay. Hawks then introduced the script to his friend, actor Malcolm Goodwin, who signed on to direct. The film was shot within 17 days in and around Thousand Oaks, California.

== Release ==
The film's United States distribution rights were acquired by DigiNext Films in August 2014. The film was released in select theaters by DigiNext on February 6, 2015.
