= Annalisa Cochrane =

American actress

- Born: United States
- Occupation: Actress
- Years active: 2015–present

Annalisa Cochrane is an American actress. She first appeared onscreen in the television film The Bride He Bought Online (2015). She is known for her recurring role as Yasmine in the Netflix series Cobra Kai (2018–2025) and her main role as Addy Prentiss in the critically praised Peacock series One of Us Is Lying (2021–2022). Since 2025, she has been working as a video producer for Morning Brew.

== Early life ==
Annalisa Cochrane spent more than ten years of her childhood in Pune. She first expressed interest in acting after watching The Chronicles of Narnia: The Lion, the Witch and the Wardrobe (2005)—a film adaptation of C. S. Lewis's 1950 novel—at age eight. She stated: "Lucy Pevensie was played by a brunette ... but ... in all the illustrations I'd seen, she was blond and ... it just didn't sit right with me ... but from then on, I was like, I have to be an actor".

== Career ==
Cochrane began acting professionally at age 17; her first role was in Lifetime television film The Bride He Bought Online (2015).

In October 2019, Cochrane was cast in Peacock's pilot for the mystery drama series One of Us Is Lying. Based on Karen M. McManus's 2017 novel of the same name, it follows a group of students who become murder suspects after the death of their classmate. Cochrane portrays Addy, a popular cheerleader who fears her life will be ruined if people knew her secrets. Before auditioning, Cochrane was aware of the novel since it was a New York Times Best Seller. Following her initial audition, she read the book, which helped her understand the character better: "It's everything. That first-person narrative gives you the blueprint for your entire character and world-building. I always say I feel like I cheated with the callbacks and the test because I had it right there. All the imagination work was almost done for me." The pilot was filmed in November. The show was later given a full series order, which was filmed in May 2021. One of Us Is Lying was released five months later to positive reviews and quickly garnered a devoted following. The Wall Street Journal described the actors as "very capable".

In January 2022, One of Us Is Lying was renewed for a second season, which was released on October 20. MEAWW considered the returning cast to be "phenomenal", and praised Cochrane—as well as co-stars Marianly Tejada, Chibuikem Uche, and Cooper van Grootel—for "steal[ing] the show".

In 2025, Cochrane joined Morning Brew, as a video producer.

== Filmography ==
Year	Title	Role	Notes	Ref.
2015	The Bride He Bought Online	Kaley	Television film	
2015	Baby Daddy	Seventeen-year-old Emma	Episode: "Parental Guidance Suggested"	
2016	Modern Family	Melanie	Episode: "Promposal"	
2016	The Night Stalker	Mary	Television film	
2016	Major Crimes	Madeline Kimball	Episode: "N.S.F.W"	
2016	Air Jaws: Night Stalker	TBD	Television special	
2016	Emma's Chance	Other girl		
2017	Henry Danger	Noelle	Episode: "Double Date Danger"	
2017	It's Always Sunny in Philadelphia	Birthday girl	Episode: "PTSDee"	
2017	Famous in Love	Hot girl	Episode: "Pilot"	
2017	Days of Our Lives	Alyssa	1 episode	
2017	The Young and the Restless	Zoey	Recurring; 12 episodes	
2017	Brown Girls	Emily	Television film	
2018–2025	Cobra Kai	Yasmine	Recurring role (seasons 1, 3, 4, 5 and 6)	
2018	Heathers	Shelby Dunnstock	Recurring; 8 episodes	
2018	NCIS: Los Angeles	Emily Conway	Episode: "A Diamond in the Rough"	
2018	Kappa Crypto	Rebecca	Main role; 8 episodes	
2019	Weird City	Colleen	Episode: "Go to College"	
2019	Into the Dark	Kellyann	Episode: "Pure"	
2019	Apparition	Skyler		
2020	Confessional	Raquel		
2021–2022	One of Us Is Lying	Addy Prentiss	Main role	
2022	The Good Doctor	Kayla	Episode: "Growing Pains"	
2023	NCIS	Lisa Swenson	Episode: "Unusual Suspects"	
2024	What Happens in Miami	Autumn		
2025	S.W.A.T.	Lucy	Episode: "Exploited"	
2025	Tracker	Riley Adams	Episode: "Collision"	
2025	I Love LA	Paulena	2 episodes	
2025	A Blind Bargain	Young Joy Fontaine		
