= Lawrence Saint-Victor =

American actor (born 1982)

- Born: June 14, 1982 (age 44); Rockland County, New York, U.S.
- Education: State University of New York, Purchase (BFA)
- Years active: 2004–present
- Spouse: Shay Flake (m. 2007)
- Children: 1

Lawrence Saint-Victor (born June 14, 1982) is an American actor and writer, who was on the cast of the soap opera Guiding Light, playing Remy Boudreau from April 2006 until the soap's ending in September 2009. Since January 2013, Saint-Victor has played attorney Carter Walton on the American CBS Daytime soap opera The Bold and the Beautiful, a role for which he received a Daytime Emmy Award nomination for Outstanding Supporting Actor in a Drama Series in 2026. Saint-Victor also joined the show's writing team in 2021, earning three Daytime Emmy Award nominations for Outstanding Drama Series Writing Team in 2023, 2024, and 2026.

== Early life and education ==
Born and raised in Rockland County, New York, Saint-Victor attended Ramapo Senior High School in Spring Valley, NY and later the State University of New York at Purchase. His mother is of African American origin and his father is of Haitian descent.

== Career ==
He portrayed Remy on Guiding Light between 2006 and 2009. Saint-Victor has been Carter on The Bold and Beautiful since 2013 and penned his first script for the soap that aired on January 16. Saint-Victor starred, wrote and co-produced the 2009 webseries, Wedlocked, alongside future The Bold and the Beautiful co-star Karla Mosley (Maya), who served as producer. He is in the 2015 film, Pass the Light.

== Personal life ==
He married his college sweetheart, Shay Flake, on September 1, 2007.

== Filmography ==
Films where Lawrence Saint-Victor has played a role
Year	Title	Role	Notes	Ref.
2011	My Last Day Without You	Dwayne		
2015	Pass the Light	Trevor		
2015	Collar	Carl		

Television shows in which Lawrence Saint-Victor has played a role
Year	Title	Role	Notes	Ref.
2006–2009	Guiding Light	Remy Boudreau	236 episodes	
2007	Law & Order: Special Victims Unit	Paramedic Jackson	Episode: "Paternity"	
2009	Ugly Betty	James	Episode: "The Sex Issue"	
2011	Onion SportsDome	Alger Fox	Episode #1.1	
2012	For Better or Worse	Robert	Episode: "Moving On"	
2013–present	The Bold and the Beautiful	Carter Walton	Series regular (2013—16; 2020—present)	
2013–present	The Bold and the Beautiful	Carter Walton	Recurring (2016—2019)	
2013–present	The Bold and the Beautiful		Script writer (2021—present)	
2016	Zoe Ever After	Stephen	2 episodes	
2017	Hashtag Awareness: The Webseries	James	Episode: "Physical Security"	
2017–2019	Stepford Sidechix	Brent	9 episodes	
2018	Wed-Locked	Robert	Television film	
2018	Scissor Seven	Mad Bark	4 episodes	
2018	All About the Washingtons	Blake	2 episodes	

Video games in which Lawrence Saint-Victor has played a role
Year	Title	Role	Ref.
2020	NBA 2K21	Ace Beckett	

== Accolades ==
List of awards and nominations
Year	Award	Category	Work	Result	Ref.
2014	NAACP Image Award	Outstanding Actor in a Daytime Drama Series	The Bold and the Beautiful	Nominated	
2016	Christian Film Festival-Menchville Baptist Church	Best Cast	Pass the Light	Won	
2023	Daytime Emmy Award	Outstanding Drama Series Writing Team (shared with others/credited as a Writer)	The Bold and the Beautiful	Nominated	
2024	Daytime Emmy Award	Outstanding Drama Series Writing Team (shared with others/credited as a Writer)	The Bold and the Beautiful	Nominated	
2026	Daytime Emmy Award	Outstanding Drama Series Writing Team (shared with others/credited as a Writer)	The Bold and the Beautiful	Nominated	
2026	Daytime Emmy Award	Outstanding Supporting Actor in a Drama Series	The Bold and the Beautiful	Nominated	
