= Bad Hair Day (2015 film) =

2015 television film directed by Érik Canuel

- Promotional poster
- Genre: Comedy, Adventure, Teen
- Written by: Matt Eddy; Billy Eddy; Eric M. Gardner; Steven H. Wilson
- Story by: Eric M. Gardner; Steven H. Wilson
- Directed by: Érik Canuel
- Starring: Laura Marano; Leigh-Allyn Baker
- Theme music composer: Michel Corriveau
- Countries of origin: United States; Canada
- Original language: English

Production
- Producer: François Sylvestre
- Cinematography: Mario Janelle
- Editor: Jean-François Bergeron
- Running time: 91 minutes
- Production company: Muse Distribution International

Original release
- Network: Disney Channel
- Release: February 13, 2015

Bad Hair Day is a 2015 crime comedy film released as a Disney Channel Original Movie which premiered on February 13, 2015, starring Laura Marano and Leigh-Allyn Baker. The story centers on 16-year-old Monica Reeves, who is running for Prom Queen at her high school. One day, she wakes up with crazy hair after combining loads of different products. But Monica soon has bigger things to worry about when ex-police Lieutenant Elizabeth "Liz" Morgan arrives at Monica’s door in search of a $7 million diamond necklace. The two become unlikely friends as they race to fix Monica’s hair for prom and protect the necklace from falling into the hands of a world-renowned jewel thief, Pierce Peters.

== Plot ==
Monica Reeves, a high school senior, is determined to become prom queen and is trying to decide whether to attend MIT or a state university. The day before her senior prom, Monica wakes up with a bad hair day, as well as her prom dress having melted and her prom shoes broken. She then learns that today is the only day prior to leaving for college that she will be able to take her driving test.

Monica answers the door to a woman claiming to be an FBI agent. The woman, Liz Morgan, seeks a necklace that Monica purchased at an antique shop. In verifying Liz's credentials, Monica discovers that Liz is not actually an FBI agent. Monica agrees to give the necklace to Liz after Liz drives her around town on her errands to have her hair fixed, replace her outfit, and take her driving test.

Monica finds that she cannot get an appointment at her hair salon and that the shop will not refund or replace her ruined outfit. While in the mall food court, Liz and Monica discover that Monica's boyfriend is on a date with Ashley, Monica's school rival for prom queen. Meanwhile, Pierce Peters, a jewel thief who is also pursuing the diamond necklace, begins trailing Monica and Liz. After Liz tries to retaliate against Kyle by pinning him to a table and threatening to arrest him, she herself gets arrested and Monica learns that Liz is a suspended police officer.

The duo proceed to the DMV for Monica to attempt her driving test, conducted using Liz's car. After driving through several residential front lawns, the DMV employee conducting orders Monica to pull over and end the test. As the car stops, Liz notices Pierce driving up in their rear-view mirror and tells Monica to drive. After successfully losing Pierce, they return to the DMV, where the Monica is told that she failed her driving test and Liz's car is towed to a tow yard. Liz confesses that the diamond necklace is a priceless piece of jewelry worth seven million dollars. Pierce had stolen the necklace from a local museum, a crime Liz felt guilty for since she attempted to apprehend Pierce on her own, rather than call for backup. When attempting to sell the necklace to a black-market buyer, pierce accidently gave the necklace to a bystander who proceeded to trade it away. Liz tracked the necklace as it changed hands many times before eventually being bought by Monica at the antique store. Monica and Liz argu about what to do next, eventually parting ways.

Pierce sends Monica a video demanding she bring the necklace to him and shows her that he has kidnapped her father. Monica reunites with Liz and the two work together to recover Liz's car from the tow yard. With the necklace in hand, Monica and Liz meet Pierce in a warehouse, giving him the necklace. Pierce attempts to leave on the promise that Monica's father will be released once he has escaped, but Monica reveals that she already knows where her father is due to her ability to track his location, and that they came here to ensure Pierce's capture. Liz tases Pierce as police backup arrives, securing the scene and arresting pierce. Bringing the necklace into the police station, Liz earns the respect of the police chief, who is also her mother. Liz is reinstated to the police force.

Liz then helps Monica get ready for the prom by fixing her hair and using clothes and accessories found in the police evidence room. Monica is even allowed to wear the priceless diamond necklace with a full police escort. Monica and Liz both attend the senior prom, where Monica is told that she has been voted prom queen after Kyle's infidelity went viral. Monica tells the crowd that being perfect is overrated, and all enjoy the night. She also decides to go to MIT.

== Cast ==
- Laura Marano as Monica Reeves
- Leigh-Allyn Baker as Liz
- Christian Campbell as Pierce
- Alain Goulem as Monica's Dad
- Christian Paul as Ed
- Kiana Madeira as Sierra
- Jake Manley as Kyle Timmons
- Zoé De Grand Maison as Ashley
- Susan Almgren as Chief Edna Morgan

== Production ==
Filming occurred in the city of Montreal, Quebec. In an interview with Variety, Baker said, "I wanted to executive produce because I wanted to see what it was like to build and fulfill a vision from the ground up, and since this was Disney Channel's first movie with an adult lead, I wanted that role to be protected and I wanted the movie to have my creative stamp on it." She also liked that she got to work on the Disney movie because it taps into her family unit fanbase. Marano also mentioned that it was her first DCOM. Filming took place in Montreal, standing in for an unnamed American city. Marano noted that in contrast to Austin & Ally which had four cameras and shot about ten scenes a day, the film shot with fewer cameras and fewer scenes, one of which took the entire day.

Marano said that she likes that her character embodies two normally contrasting high school cliches – a prom queen nominee who likes beauty and fashion and is popular, and a computer whiz who has a nerdy tech obsession and codes. She also likes that she relates with her character when deciding whether to go to the state college or MIT.

The film's soundtrack was composed by Michael Corriveau. He mixed over 60 minutes of music with Sylvain Lefebvre of Lamajeure. According to the Lamajeure website, the soundtrack used pop, rhythmic and classical music. Corriveau worked with the Philharmonic Orchestra of Prague, and the recording was done at the Dvorak Hall at the Rudolfinum.

The feature song is "For the Ride" by Laura Marano. The song used in the trailer was "Nuthin'" by Lecrae. Other songs include: "Rooftop" by Skylar Stecker, "Colorful World" by Shayna Rose, "All Over The World" by The Fooo Conspiracy, "Happy Place" feat. Hanna Ashbook by Oh, Hush!, and "Heatroc" feat. Lazarus by Agzilla.

== Broadcast ==
The film was first released on February 6, 2015 on WATCH Disney Channel, and had its premiere broadcast in the US on February 13. It premiered in Canada on the Family Channel on March 20, and in Australia on April 17.

== Reception ==
Bad Hair Day delivered 4.0 million viewers for its television premiere and has had 435,000 views on the WATCH Disney Channel app since it was released on February 6. Amy Amatangelo of The Hollywood Reporter found the duo of Baker and Marano "played well off each other", and that Marano's character was "refreshingly age-appropriate". She found the movie to be goofy but not slapsticky, and that it was "like a junior version of Thelma and Louise albeit with a much, much happier ending."
