= Sand Castles (film) =

- Theatrical release poster
- Directed by: Clenét Verdi-Rose
- Screenplay by: Jordon Hodges
- Produced by: Jordon Hodges; Chris Nickin
- Starring: Jordon Hodges; Anne Winters; Randy Spence; Saxon Trainor; Daniella Grace; Scott Jemison; Clint Howard
- Cinematography: Chris Faulisi
- Edited by: Connor Daly
- Music by: Todd Maki
- Production company: MarVista Entertainment
- Distributed by: MarVista Entertainment
- Release dates: March 21, 2014 (Gasparilla); May 21, 2014 (North America)
- Running time: 93 minutes
- Country: United States
- Language: English

Sand Castles is a 2014 American drama film directed by Clenét Verdi-Rose and starring Jordon Hodges and Anne Winters. It co-stars Randy Spence, Saxon Trainor, Daniella Grace, Scott Jemison, and Clint Howard.

Filming took place in Goshen, Indiana and St. Joseph, Michigan in October 2012. The film had its world premiere on March 21, 2014 at the Gasparilla Film Festival, where it won the Grand Jury Prize in the festival's New Visions Competition. The film had its North America release by MarVista Entertainment on February 16, 2016.

== Premise ==
In rural Indiana, Noah Daly (Jordon Hodges) and his impoverished family wrestle with the mysterious return of his now mute sister Lauren (Anne Winters), who was kidnapped and held captive for over a decade.

== Cast ==
- Jordon Hodges as Noah Daly
- Anne Winters as Lauren Daly
- Randy Spence as Tommy Daly
- Saxon Trainor as Marie Daly
- Daniella Grace as Alison Paige
- Scott Jemison as Detective Cloud
- Clint Howard as Todd Carlson
- Joe Cipriano as Young Noah Daly

== Reception ==
Sand Castles received widespread critical acclaim while playing on the film festival circuit. Critic David Appleford of Valley Screen and Stage gave the film a glowing review, writing: "Backed by an outstanding, atmospheric score from musician Todd Maki and solid performances from Hodges, Trainor and Spence, plus an effective appearance from Clint Howard whose somewhat creepy presence only adds to the overall mystery of Lauren's kidnapper, director Clenét Verdi-Rose has delivered a feature that needs to venture further than the confines of the festival circuit."

Views on Film gave a "thumbs up" rating the film 3 out of 4 stars and calling it "powerful" while singling out praise for the performances of Jordon Hodges, Randy Spence and Clint Howard. The review site placed Sand Castles on its "Top Ten Movie Picks for 2014". Film Pulse gave an overall good review of the film saying "the film has been well-received at numerous festivals including the winning of several awards, and I admit that I can understand why." The Reading Eagle gave a mixed review for Sand Castles, criticizing it for its "gratuitous, insufficiently established romance" while also writing that the film "deserves credit for sustaining its empathy for ordinary people blindsided by fate" and praising the performances of Saxon Trainor and Clint Howard. rCritic Herbert Paine of BroadwayWorld.com gave a completely positive review for Sand Castles, labeling it a "haunting and powerful film", while calling the performance of Anne Winters "stunning". Bradley Smith of Red Carpet Crash says, "Sand Castles is an interesting, emotional roller coaster."

=== Awards ===
- Feature Film Award of Merit at the Catalina Film Festival (2014, won)
- Best Feature Film at the Cincinnati Film Festival (2014, won)
- Best Feature Film at the Gasparilla International Film Festival (2014, won)
- Best Feature at the Grand Rapids Film Festival (2014, won)
- Leonardo's Horse for Best Ensemble Cast at the Milano International Film Festival Awards (2014, won)
- Best Actor at the Myrtle Beach International Film Festival (2014, won – Randy Spence)
- Best Feature Film at the Myrtle Beach International Film Festival (2014, won)
- Domani Vision Award for Best Lead Actor at the New York Visionfest (2014, won – Jordon Hodges)
- Abe Schrager Cinematography Award at the New York Visionfest (2014, won – Chris Faulisi)
- Best Feature Film at the Rainier Independent Film Festival (2014, won)
- Audience Choice at the River Bend Film Festival (2014, won)
- Best Feature at the River Bend Film Festival (2014, won)
- Best Narrative Feature at the Hoosierdance International Film Festival (2015, won)
