= Richard Burgi =

American actor (born 1958)

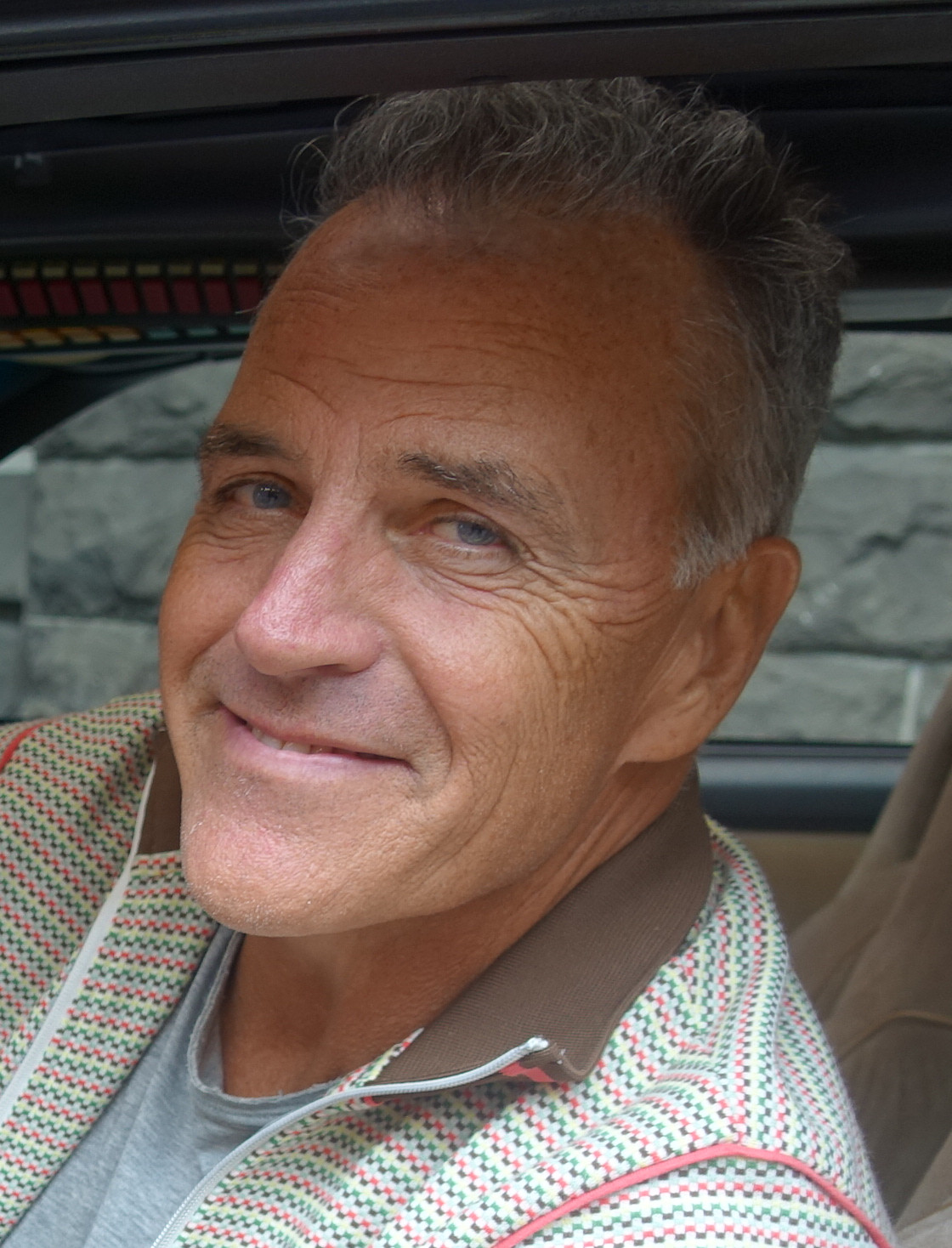
- Burgi in 2019
- Born: Richard William Burgi; July 30, 1958 (age 68); Montclair, New Jersey, US
- Occupation: Actor
- Years active: 1986–present

Richard William Burgi (/ˈbɜːrɡi/, born July 30, 1958) is an American film and television actor best known for the roles of Det. Jim Ellison on The Sentinel, as Karl Mayer on Desperate Housewives and as Kevin Carroll on the first season of 24. He also portrayed Paul Hornsby in the ABC daytime soap opera General Hospital, and Ashland Locke in the CBS daytime soap opera The Young and the Restless.

== Early life ==
Burgi was born in the suburbs of New Jersey in Montclair, New Jersey. His family was involved in community theatre. His brother, Chuck Burgi, is a well-known rock drummer who as of 2023 has been touring with Billy Joel. After high school, Burgi travelled through the US and Europe, taking odd jobs.

== Career ==
Burgi began his career in New York, which led to regular roles on the Manhattan-based daytime soap operas One Life to Live, Another World and As the World Turns. After moving to Los Angeles, he appeared on the serial Days of Our Lives. He made a number of guest appearances on episodic television shows, and was also cast in Chameleons, a TV movie, in 1989. He had a role on Viper, and landed his first lead role in the 1994 television series One West Waikiki.

Burgi was cast as the lead in the series The Sentinel. The show ran for three seasons; its cancellation left key plot issues unresolved, which led to a successful fan campaign for additional episodes to end the story. Burgi went on to roles on The District, 24 and Judging Amy as well as bit parts in other television series and films, including Matlock. In the 1998 made-for-TV remake of the movie I Married a Monster, Burgi starred as Nick Farrell (the monster).

One of Burgi's most notable roles was on Desperate Housewives as Karl Mayer, the ex-husband of Susan Mayer and father to Julie. Burgi appeared as Karl for several seasons. He also starred in the big-screen thriller Cellular in 2004 as well as a remake of Fun with Dick and Jane and In Her Shoes as Toni Collette's love interest in 2005. In 2009, Burgi played the police officer in Friday the 13th and a stylish doctor in Nip/Tuck.

Burgi guest-starred as Thomas Wellington in CBS's Harper's Island (2009).

In 2010, Burgi guest-starred in an episode of Law & Order: Special Victims Unit. In 2011, Burgi guest-starred on TV Land's Hot in Cleveland. In 2011, it was announced that he would play Karl Parker in My Family USA, which premiered on September 26, 2011. In 2011, Burgi landed a new recurring role as CIA hitman Clyde Decker, who is part of a government conspiracy targeting the title character in Chuck. In 2011, Burgi appeared in season 9 of One Tree Hill as Brooke Davis's father. In 2012, he starred in cult classic "Christmas Twister" as TV Reporter 1, in which his character was killed trying to parry away a low flying shipping container. In 2013, Burgi guest-starred on Lifetime's Devious Maids as a brother, uncle and love interest, Henri.

From 2015–2016, Burgi played Paul Hornsby in the ABC daytime serial General Hospital.

In 2021, Soap Opera Digest reported that Burgi had been cast in the recurring role of Ashland Locke on CBS' daytime soap opera, The Young and the Restless, with the character first appearing on March 11, 2021. In 2022, Burgi was fired from Y&R for violating the show's COVID-19 policy, and his role on the show was recast with former Guiding Light star Robert Newman.

== Filmography ==
=== Film ===
Year	Title	Role	Notes	Refs
2004	Decoys	Detective Francis Kirk	Science fiction and horror film	
2004	Cellular	Craig Martin		
2005	In Her Shoes	Jim Danvers		
2007	Hostel: Part II	Todd		
2008	Christmas Cottage	Bill Kinkade	Direct to video	
2009	Friday the 13th	Officer Bracke	A reboot of the Friday the 13th film series	
2011	Super Eruption	Charlie		
2013	The Green Inferno	Charles, Justine's Father	Released on September 25, 2015	
2014	Fatal Instinct	Michael Decker		
2016	No Letting Go	Henry		
2020	The 2nd	Director Phillips		

=== Television ===
Year	Title	Role	Notes	Refs
1986–1988	Another World	Chad Rollo	Main role	
1991	The Flash	Curtis Bohannan	Episode: "Deadly Nightshade"	
1992–1993	Days of Our Lives	Philip Collier	Main role	
1994–1996	One West Waikiki	Lieutenant Mack Wolfe	Main role	
1994	Seinfeld	Ben Pfeffer	Episode: "The Hamptons"	
1996–1999	The Sentinel	Detective Jim Ellison	Main role	
1999	Action	Cole Ricardi	Episodes: "Gross Player", "Blowhard"	
2000	Just Shoot Me!	Robert Gallatin	Episode: "Mum's the Word"	
2000–2003	The District	Captain Vincent Hunter	Recurring roles	
2001	Twice in a Lifetime	Jimmy O'Connor / Ray Tambor	Episode: "The Knockout"	
2001–2002	24	Alan York / Kevin Carroll	Recurring role	
2002–2003	Judging Amy	Michael Cassidy	Recurring role	
2002	Firefly	Lieutenant Womack	Episode: "The Message"	
2002	CSI: Crime Scene Investigation	Rick Weston	Episode: "High and Low"	
2004	Starship Troopers 2: Hero of the Federation	Captain V.J. Dax	Television film	
2004–2012	Desperate Housewives	Karl Mayer	Main role (season 2); recurring (seasons 1, 5–6); guest (seasons 3–4, 8)	
2005	Point Pleasant	Dr. Ben Kramer	Main role	
2007	Las Vegas	Vince Peterson	Recurring role	
2007	Shark	Dr. Neil Fuller	Episode: "Eye Of The Beholder"	
2007	Big Shots	Gavin Carter	Episode: "The Way We Weren't"	
2007	In God's Country	Josiah Leavitt	Television film	
2008	Reaper	Mike Volta	Episode: "The Leak"	
2009	Knight Rider	Jack Hurst	Episode: "Knight To King's Pawn"	
2009	Nip/Tuck	Dr. Logan Taper	Episode: "Allegra Caldarello"	
2009	Harper's Island	Thomas Wellington	Recurring role	
2010	Law & Order: Special Victims Unit	Richard Morgan	Episode: "Confidential"	
2010	NCIS	Randall Hammond	Episode: "Patriot Down"	
2010	Lie to Me	Governor Brooks	Episode: "Bullet Bump"	
2011	Breakout Kings	Andre Brennan	Episode: "One For The Money"	
2011	Hot in Cleveland	Timothy	Episode: "Unseparated at Birthdates"	
2011	The Glades	Dr. William Grant	Episode: "Addicted To Love"	
2011	Castle	Charlie Turner	Episode: "Heartbreak Hotel"	
2011	Chuck	Clyde Decker	Episodes: "Chuck Versus the Cliffhanger", "Chuck Versus the Zoom", "Chuck Versus the Business Trip", "Chuck Versus the Hack Off"	
2012	One Tree Hill	Ted Davis	Recurring role (season 9)	
2012	CSI: Miami	Randall Stafford	Episode: "Law & Disorder"	
2012	Burn Notice	Morris	Episode: "Reunion"	
2012	Blue Bloods	Councilman Anthony Mancini	Episode: "Domestic Disturbance"	
2013	Body of Proof	District Attorney Dan Russell	Recurring role	
2013	Devious Maids	Henri	Episode: "Making Your Bed"	
2013	Kirstie	Tony Cameron	Episode: "Arlo Moves In"	
2014	Hawaii Five-0	Curtis Novak	Episode: "O ka Pili 'Ohana ka 'Oi"	
2014	Crystal Skulls	John Winston	Television film	
2015–2016	General Hospital	Paul Hornsby	Recurring role	
2016	Rush Hour	Todd Taymor	Episode: "O Hostage! My Hostage!"	
2021–2022	The Young and the Restless	Ashland Locke	Main role	
