= Christmas Next Door =

2017 film directed by Jonathan Wright

- Film poster
- Written by: Judith Berg; Sandra Berg; Janna King
- Directed by: Jonathan Wright
- Starring: Jesse Metcalfe; Fiona Gubelmann; Brittany Bristow; Jenna Weir; Joy Tanner; Liam MacDonald; Andrew Jackson; Eugene Clark
- Music by: James Mark Stewart
- Country of origin: United States
- Original language: English

Production
- Producers: Agnes Bristow; Leif Bristow
- Cinematography: Russ Goozee
- Editor: Brigitte Rabazo
- Running time: 86 minutes

Original release
- Network: Hallmark Channel
- Release: December 16, 2017

Christmas Next Door is a 2017 American romance television film directed by Jonathan Wright and starring Fiona Gubelmann and Jesse Metcalfe. It premiered on 16 December 2017 on Hallmark Channel as part of Countdown to Christmas — annual holiday programming event. It attracted more than 4.4 million viewers, ranking 8th in top 10 cable programs.

== Summary ==
Eric Redford (Jesse Metcalfe) is a popular writer and bachelor, writing books on living single. When he is left in charge of his niece and nephew for the Christmas season, he turns to neighbour April Stewart (Fiona Gubelmann), who loves the holiday season, for help. As the result, he slowly starts to reassess his attitude to Christmas, life and love.

== Cast ==
- Jesse Metcalfe as Eric Redford
- Fiona Gubelmann as April Stewart
- Jacob Blair as Steve
- Brittany Bristow as Elaine
- Jenna Weir as Chelsea
- Joy Tanner as Dana
- Andrew Jackson as Bruce
- Eugene Clark as Nick
- Tara Yelland as Bridget
- Mary Long as Sarah Redford
- Christian Potenza as Ryan
- Kevin Claydon as Jack
- Evan Cleaver as Ted
- Liam MacDonald as Liam
