= Clenet Verdi-Rose =

American film director

Clenét Verdi-Rose
- Born: February 26, 1982 (age 44); Falmouth, Massachusetts, United States
- Occupations: Director, producer, writer
- Years active: 2005–present

Clenét Verdi-Rose (born February 26, 1982) is an American film director, producer, and screenwriter best known for directing feature films Skyler (2012) and Sand Castles (2014).

== Early life ==
Verdi-Rose was born and raised in Falmouth, Massachusetts. His passion for filmmaking began at an early age. He graduated from Wheaton College Norton, Ma. in 2004 as an Arts Honor Student who also studied filmmaking abroad at the Lorenzo de' Medici School in Florence, Italy.

== Career ==
Verdi-Rose directed and co-produced True Guts, the award-winning documentary film on Crohn's disease recognized with a Freddie Award at the International Health & Medical Media Awards in 2007. Establishing himself as an assistant director working on films such as: Meet Bill (2007), Green Street Hooligans 2 (2009) and Little Birds (2012); he was accepted to the Directors Guild of America (DGA). In 2011, Verdi-Rose co-founded the production company, Green Rose Pictures and directed its first feature film, Skyler in 2012. His filmwork was recognized with several awards and nominations in film festivals: Best Feature Film in the Los Angeles Arthouse Film Festival, Silver Award for Feature Film in the California Film Awards, Award of Merit in the Los Angeles Cinema Festival of Hollywood and nominated for Best Picture and HRIFF Award in the Hollywood Reel Independent Film Festival Verdi-Rose directed the film Sand Castles which premiered in Los Angeles in June 2014 during Dances With Films at the TCL Chinese Theatre. It earned him nominations for Best Director at the Julien Dubuque International Film Festival 2014 and the New York Visionfest. Sand Castles' film won Best Feature Film awards at Gasparilla International Film Festival, Grand Rapids Film Festival, Myrtle Beach International Film Festival, Rainer Independent Film Festival, and Best Feature and Audience Award at the River Bend Film Festival and the Award of Merit at Catalina Film Festival in 2014. It was also nominated for Grand Jury Best Film and won Best Ensemble Cast at the Milan International Film Festival in 2014. Director Verdi-Rose and cinematographer, Chris Faulisi were praised for Sand Castles film for "lingering in the mind a few bravura visuals", and Critic David Appleford of Valley Screen and Stage wrote, "the director, Clenét Verdi-Rose, has delivered a feature that needs to venture further than the confines of the festival circuit." Verdi-Rose was listed in list of Hollywood's Hottest Young Directors with Jeff McNichols and Gia Coppola.

In 2015, Clenét Verdi-Rose was nominated for a James Beard Award for Excellence in Visual and Technical Excellence as a Producer of the Tastemade show, The Grill-Iron. It was later picked up by the Cooking Channel.

Producing the Heritage Tastemade series that highlights chefs across America for their culinary specialties and cultural aspects, Verdi-Rose was awarded The Webby Awards People's Choice Award for Film and Video: Documentary series in 2016.

Clenét Verdi-Rose was awarded the Best Directing (Non-fiction) Winner by the IAWTV International Academy of Web Television, Inc. on October 4, 2017, at the Skirball Center, Los Angeles for the Kitchen Little Tastemade show. It is a series that has kids watch a "how-to" recipe video and then instruct a professional chef in creating the foods, with a comedic tone. Variety recommended it on its list to see on Facebook Watch. Kitchen Little was also nominated by the Webby Awards for Film & Video Food and Drink category in 2018.

"From television commercials to feature films to fun food videos with celebrity chefs and kids, this immensely talented storyteller is making Falmouth proud" is noted in his hometown newspaper and "one who connects people all over the world. Stories like that may be shared via social media, but they are understood, they are felt when shared from person to person."

Clenét Verdi-Rose as Director and Producer, in 2020, was awarded The Webby Award's People's Voice Award for the Tastemade winning show, Sunday at Nana's with comedian and host, Ian Hecox, in the category of Social/ Food & Dinner ( Series & Campaigns).

Sponsored by The Russo Brothers, AGBO, and NIAF, Clenét Verdi-Rose directed, wrote, and produced an Italian-American documentary film, Radici, World Premiere at the Ferrara Film Festival, Ferrara, Italy on September 21, 2023 with high praise from the Italy audiences. "The film Radici was successfully presented to the world premiere at the Ferrara Film Festival on September 21... a visit with dual Italian-American citizenship that came back to find its roots and learn about it more from the Feast of San Antonio.

The movie, Radici, is dedicated to William V. Verdi and to the ancestors of Margherita Verdi and Clenét Verdi-Rose from the Campana area, Avellino di Montefalcione.

The director of Radici, Clenét Verdi-Rose, known for his numerous films, but "The film Radici will always have a very special place in his heart". Radici has been highly appreciated by Ferrara public, it has won numerous awards in Italy and will be screened in Boston's NorthEnd, to the Italian-American community with La festa di Sant'Antonio and in other American and European film festivals."

== Personal life ==
Clenét Verdi-Rose moved to Los Angeles, California in 2005 to pursue his career in filmmaking.
