= F the Prom =

2017 film by Benny Fine

- Release poster
- Directed by: Benny Fine
- Written by: Benny Fine; Rafi Fine; Molly Prather
- Story by: The Fine Brothers
- Produced by: Scott Prisand; Jamie Bendell; Kenny Solomon; Dylan Vox; Benny Fine; Rafi Fine
- Starring: Danielle Campbell; Joel Courtney; Madelaine Petsch; Cameron Palatas; Meg DeLacy; Nicholle Tom; Richard Karn; Jill Cimorelli; Luke Bilyk; Brendan Calton; Michael Chey; Adan Allende; Diamond White; Cheri Oteri; Ian Ziering
- Cinematography: Spencer Hutchins
- Edited by: Jeremy M. Inman
- Music by: Leo Birenberg; Zach Robinson
- Production companies: Big Block Entertainment; FBE
- Distributed by: The Orchard
- Release date: December 5, 2017
- Running time: 92 minutes
- Country: United States
- Language: English

F the Prom (also known as F*&% the Prom) is a 2017 American teen comedy film directed and produced by Benny Fine and written by him, Rafi Fine, and Molly Prather. In the film, two estranged best friends reunite due to unfortunate circumstances and conspire to destroy the senior prom. The film stars Danielle Campbell, Joel Courtney, Madelaine Petsch, and Cameron Palatas, with Meg DeLacy, Nicholle Tom, Richard Karn, Jill Cimorelli, Luke Bilyk, Brendan Calton, Michael Chey, Adan Allende, Diamond White, Cheri Oteri, and Ian Ziering in supporting roles. It was released online and on-demand on December 5, 2017, to widely negative reviews.

== Plot ==
Best friends Maddy Datner and Cole Reed attend their first day of high school at Charles Adams High. Cole is pantsed by a fellow student, revealing his white briefs and earning him the nickname "Tighty". Rather than stand up for him, Maddy decides not to intervene, and refuses to talk to Cole from that point on. Three and the half years later, Maddy is at the top of the social hierarchy, and is dating the hottest boy at school, Kane. Cole, still shunned by his peers, has decided to apply to a prestigious art college.

Maddy catches her best friend Marissa making out with Kane. Revealing her disgust with Maddy's recent self-centered behavior, Marissa explains that she intends to be crowned Queen at the upcoming senior prom, which Maddy was expected to win. That night, Maddy goes to Cole's house, and they reconnect, reminiscing about their former friendship. Maddy suggests that they ruin the prom, enlisting Cole's friend Felicity to help. Felicity refuses to help at first, but when Maddy stands up for Cole against Kane, she agrees, and enlists the help of other social outcasts to execute the plan.

Maddy announces that she intends to take Cole to the prom, which greatly increases his status. Marissa tries to steal Cole's affections, but he rebuffs her. Kane, meanwhile, seeks forgiveness from Maddy. Felicity reveals that at one time, she and Kane were together, until Marissa manipulated Kane into dumping her for Maddy. As the date for prom approaches, Maddy forgives Kane and reneges on her commitment to take Cole as her date. Feeling hurt, Cole nearly calls the plan off, but his father intervenes. A former prom king himself, he has come to regret his behavior in high school, and believes his lack of humility was the reason why Cole's mom left them. He also believes that if his prom had been ruined, he would be more humble. Cole initially does not believe him, but his father urges him to humble the popular kids so they do not turn out like him, and he reluctantly agrees to go through with the plan.

The night of the prom, Felicity and the other conspirators rig the voting system, drug Marissa's punch, and turn the popular kids against each other using social media, including posting fake pornographic images of one boy. At the end of the night, Maddy is crowned prom queen, and is thus doused with tar—the punishment intended for Marissa—before one of the kids pulls the fire alarm. Marissa takes revenge on Cole for rejecting her by once again pantsing him in front of the crowd. Enraged, Cole delivers a lengthy speech in which he criticizes how the students have hurt each other in pursuit of popularity that is ultimately without meaning or worth.

Cole ignores Maddy for the rest of the school year due to her betrayal at prom and the fact that she could have helped him all the past years in high school, but instead stood idly by and watched as he was tormented by other students. After graduation, Felicity explains to Cole that the only reason he was accepted into the college he has been trying to attend is because Maddy sent his profile in to a recruiter. Unaware of this information, Cole stops by Maddy's house to give her a graphic novel of his drawings as both a thank you and a going-away present, since he leaves for school that weekend. He also confesses his feelings for her. Maddy reciprocates, and they kiss, but Cole ultimately rejects her offer of a relationship, wishing to remain friends instead.

== Cast ==
- Danielle Campbell as Madeline "Maddy" Datner
- Joel Courtney as Cole Reed
- Madelaine Petsch as Marissa
- Cameron Palatas as Kane
- Meg DeLacy as Felicity "City" Stufts / Stuffs
- Jill Cimorelli as TIG / Abbey
- Luke Bilyk as T.J.
- Michael Chey as Sweats / Larry
- Brendan Calton as Strings / Efraim
- Adan Allende as Mutey / Emile
- Aidan Alexander as Nick
- Ian Ziering as Ken Reed
  - Logan Shroyer as young Ken
- Cheri Oteri as Christine Datner
  - Mika Cigic as young Christine
- Richard Karn as Murphy Datner
  - Michael McLean as young Murphy
- Nicholle Tom as Principal Statszill
- Diamond White as Rayna
- Tom Phelan as Jerry
- Eric Beckerman as Akiva
- Ethan James Teague as Barry
- Jeannie Elise Mai as Anna
- Edward Zo as Yang
- Lilly Singh as Miss Fallsburg (cameo appearance)

== Production ==
Principal photography began in Los Angeles on April 1, 2016.

== Reception ==
=== Critical response ===
Common Sense Media gave F the Prom a negative review of 2 out of 5 stars, criticizing the character's decisions as unconvincing, writing that the film relied on "clever dialogue to disguise the fact that it has ignored any real character development."
