= Saul: The Journey to Damascus =

2014 film directed by Mario Azzopardi

- Promotional poster
- Directed by: Mario Azzopardi
- Written by: Mario Azzopardi; John Patus
- Produced by: Leif Bristow; Margaret O'Brien
- Starring: Kyle Schmid; Emmanuelle Vaugier; John Rhys-Davies; Dan Cane
- Cinematography: Russ Goozee
- Edited by: Daniel Lapira
- Music by: Elton Zarb
- Production companies: Cittadella Malta Films; Starfield Independent Studios
- Distributed by: Entertainment One
- Release date: April 2014 (Canada)
- Running time: 86 minutes
- Countries: Canada; Malta
- Language: English

Saul: The Journey to Damascus is a 2014 biblical drama film about Saul of Tarsus, directed by Mario Azzopardi, starring Kyle Schmid as the title character. It also stars Emmanuelle Vaugier and John Rhys-Davies. The film was released direct-to-video in Canada in April 2014.

== Premise ==
Saul of Tarsus persecutes those who spread the teachings of Jesus, and witnesses the stoning of Stephen. However, he reevaluates his beliefs, converting to Christianity and being baptized as Paul.

== Cast ==
- Kyle Schmid as Saul of Tarsus
- Emmanuelle Vaugier as Mary Magdalene
- Callum Blue as Addai
- Kris Holden-Ried as Captain Jordan
- Brittany Bristow as Johanna
- John Rhys-Davies as Lord Caiphas
- Dan Cade as Stephen
- Leif Bristow as Prefect Marcus Quintas
- Brent Crawford as Ananias
- Larissa Bonaci as Esther
- Malcolm Ellul as Sahedrin Sergeant
- Mikhail Basmadjian as Follower
- Paul Portelli as Lieutenant
- Marc Cabourdin as Flavius
- Sean Buhagiar as Luke
- Andrew Mallia as St. Peter's Son
- Daniel Pace Bonello as Sahedrin Guard

== Production ==
The film is a Canadian-Maltese co-production, with location shooting taking place in Malta.
