= Zac & Mia =

2013 young adult novel

- First edition
- Author: A.J. Betts
- Language: English
- Publisher: Text Publishing
- Publication date: 24 July 2013
- Publication place: Australia
- Media type: Print
- Pages: 304
- ISBN: 0-544-66878-2

Zac & Mia is a young adult novel written by the Australian author A.J. Betts. The book was released on 24 July 2013.

== Background ==
Betts started writing the novel in 2009 after working on a cancer ward in a children's hospital. Betts' main inspiration was a young woman named Tayla, who died suddenly. She later continued writing when Tayla's mother encouraged her to continue. Betts' main job previously was being an English teacher.

== Plot ==
The novel follows seventeen-year-old Zac Meier as he undergoes treatment for non-Hodgkin lymphoma in Perth, Western Australia. He meets Mia, a fellow cancer patient in the adjacent room, and the two quickly form a connection.

== Structure ==
The novel is divided into three sections, Zac, and, and Mia. Several critics have noted similarities between the book and The Fault in Our Stars.

== Reception ==
The Australian praised the book, calling it "warm and uplifting". Australian Book Review noted that, despite the book's subject matter, it does not lapse into meldrama. The Guardian also praised the format but criticised Mia's character.

== TV series ==
The book was adapted into a web series by AwesomenessTV, which premiered on 7 November 2017 on go90. Anne Winters plays Mia, and Kian Lawley plays Zac. The series was renewed for a second season following a "strong fan response". The series was nominated for six Daytime Emmys in 2018, winning two including Outstanding Writing in a Digital Drama Series and Outstanding Lead Actress in a Digital Daytime Drama Series for Winters The second season was released on Hulu in February 2019.
