= The Marijuana Conspiracy =

2019 Canadian film directed by Craig Pryce

- Film poster
- Directed by: Craig Pryce
- Written by: Craig Pryce
- Produced by: Jennifer Haufler; Craig Pryce
- Starring: Brittany Bristow; Morgan Kohan; Julia Sarah Stone; Tymika Tafari
- Cinematography: John Berrie
- Edited by: Dona Noga; Marc Roussel
- Production company: Pot Luck Films
- Distributed by: Samuel Goldwyn Films
- Release date: December 7, 2019 (Whistler)
- Running time: 124 minutes
- Country: Canada
- Language: English

The Marijuana Conspiracy is a 2020 Canadian drama film, directed by Craig Pryce. Based on a true story, the film centres on a group of young women in 1972 who have been confined to a hospital for 98 days and made to smoke marijuana daily as part of a medical research study into the effects of cannabis on women.

== Cast ==
The film's cast includes Tymika Tafari, Julia Sarah Stone, Morgan Kohan, Brittany Bristow, Kyla Avril Young, Marie Ward, Luke Bilyk, Alanna Bale, Greg Calderone, Paulino Nunes, Paula Boudreau, Derek McGrath and Jordan Todosey.

== Release ==
The film premiered on December 7, 2019 at the Whistler Film Festival. It was picked up for commercial distribution by Samuel Goldwyn Films in 2021.

== Reception ==
The film received two Canadian Screen Award nominations at the 9th Canadian Screen Awards in 2021, for Best Costume Design (Marie Grogan Hales) and Best Makeup (Sidney Armour). Marijuana Conspiracy was also recognized with The ReFrame Stamp.
