= Jordon Hodges =

American actor

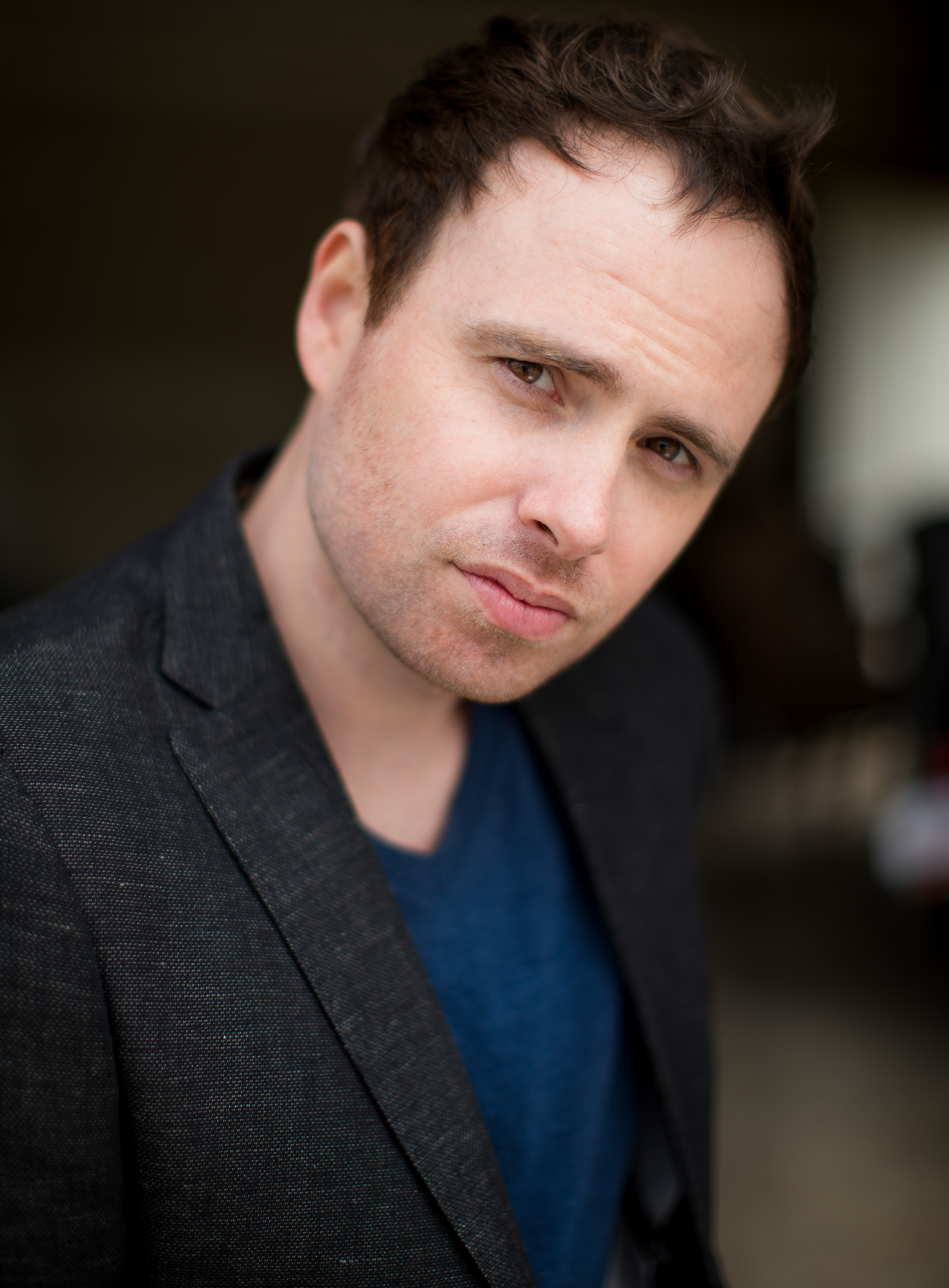
- Hodges in 2018
- Born: March 2, 1987 (age 39); Goshen, Indiana, United States
- Occupations: Actor, writer, producer
- Years active: 2008–present

Jordon Hodges (born March 2, 1987) is an American actor, screenwriter and producer known for his role as Noah Daly in the 2014 drama film Sand Castles.

== Early life ==
Jordon Hodges was born in Goshen, Indiana and attended Northridge High School. He relocated to Los Angeles to pursue his acting career in 2010.

== Career ==
Hodges made his debut in 2008's comedy film Fraternity House alongside actors Johnny Lechner and Joel Paul Reisig, which became part of the German franchise College Animals and is now known as College Animals 3.

Hodges starred in the 2011 thriller film Impulse Black, opposite actors Emme Rylan and Robert Miano. In 2011, he also appeared in the horror film Deadly Karma. In 2012, he starred in the historical drama film Mary’s Buttons, which is based on a true story and follows the criminal trial of Mrs. August Govare, who ordered her 15-year-old-son to shoot Sheriff Matthews of Macomb County, Michigan in December 1910.

In 2014, Hodges appeared in Sand Castles, opposite actors Anne Winters, Saxon Trainor and Clint Howard, which premiered in Los Angeles in June 2014 during Dances With Films at the TCL Chinese Theatre. The role of Noah Daly earned Hodges multiple awards and nominations including: Winner for "Best Lead Actor" at New York City's Visionfest and the Horse of Leonardo da Vinci nomination for "Best Lead Actor" and winner for "Best Ensemble Cast" at Milan, Italy's MIFF Awards.

Hodges is set to star in Chris Faulisi's upcoming 80s adventure The Shade Shepherd, a film set to release in early 2019.

== Filmography ==
=== Film ===
| Year | Title | Role | Notes |
|---|---|---|---|
| 2008 | Fraternity House | Pledge | a.k.a. College Animals 3 |
| 2009 | Decomposed | Dennis Reed | |
| 2010 | Minor League: A Football Story | Charlie Jones | |
| 2010 | Harvey Putter | Shamus | Cameo |
| 2010 | Casualties | PFC James Duke | Short |
| 2010 | American Scream King | Scream King | |
| 2011 | Deadly Karma | Sammy Harris | |
| 2011 | Impulse Black | Riley Cole | Also writer and producer |
| 2012 | Mary's Buttons | Oscar DeWauter | |
| 2014 | Sand Castles | Noah Daly | Also writer and producer |
| 2017 | The Things We've Seen | Rick Boem | |
| 2018 | The Shade Shepherd | Jack Ables | Also writer and producer |

=== Television ===
| Year | Title | Role | Notes |
|---|---|---|---|
| 2017 | Claws | Merle | Episode: "Quicksand" |

== River Bend ==
In 2014, Hodges became the Director of Programming of the River Bend Film Festival in his hometown of Goshen, Indiana after pitching an idea to the committee to relocate it there from South Bend, Indiana where it had been the previous 14 years. The attendance more than tripled in its first year, bringing filmmakers in from all over the United States.
