= Jeff Deverett =

American film producer

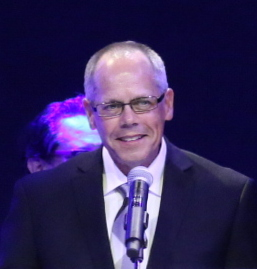
- Deverett in 2019
- Born: Toronto, Ontario, Canada
- Education: Osgoode Hall Law School; University of Toronto
- Occupations: Film producer; filmmaker; professor
- Notable work: Full Out; Kiss and Cry; The Samuel Project

Jeff Deverett is a Canadian film producer and professor at San Diego State University known for producing Full Out (2015), Kiss and Cry (2017) and The Samuel Project (2018).

== Life and career ==
Deverett and his twin brother Larry were born in Toronto, Ontario, Canada. He graduated with a Finance Degree from University of Toronto, a Law Degree from Osgoode Hall Law School and became a film professor at San Diego State University. In 2017, Deverett launched the San Diego Regional Film Commission to help boost the filmmaking reputation in San Diego County. By 2022, he produced three films distributed by Netflix.

== Filmography ==
Year	Title	Director	Producer
2004	My Brother's Keeper	No	Executive
2008	King of the Camp	Yes	Executive
2015	Full Out	No	Yes
2017	Kiss and Cry	No	Yes
2018	The Samuel Project	No	Executive
2020	Full Out 2: You Got This!	Yes	Yes
