= Fatal Instinct (2014 film) =

- Official poster
- Directed by: Luciano Saber
- Written by: Luciano Saber
- Produced by: Luciano Saber
- Starring: Ivan Sergei; Masiela Lusha; Richard Burgi; Drew Fuller
- Cinematography: Thor Wixom
- Edited by: Luciano Saber
- Music by: Chris Piorkowski
- Production companies: Canal+; Optimize Films
- Distributed by: Canal+
- Release date: June 3, 2014 (United States)
- Running time: 96 minutes
- Country: United States
- Language: English

Fatal Instinct is a 2014 American thriller film, written, directed and produced by Luciano Saber, starring Ivan Sergei, Masiela Lusha, Richard Burgi, Drew Fuller, Krista Allen, Peter Dobson, and Anne Winters. The film premiered in the United States on June 3, 2014, airing on the Showtime network.

== Plot ==
A police detective follows a trail of evidence that eventually seems to lead to his trusted partner's ex-con brother who he helped put in prison years ago.

== Cast ==
- Ivan Sergei as Jack Gates
- Masiela Lusha as Melissa Gates
- Richard Burgi as Michael Decker
- Drew Fuller as Danny Gates
- Krista Allen as Jen Decker
- Peter Dobson as Sgt. Birch
- Anne Winters as Kelly Decker
- Adrian Tudor as Father Paul
- Dominique Swain as Ally
- Scott Freeburg as Skinner
- Giovanni Adams as Mason
- Brenton Earley as Officer Smith
- Devan Gavin as Tai
- Parker Harris as Johnny
- Kovar McClure as John
- Russell Charles Pitts as Leon
- Ann Reilly as Grace
- Jonathan Root as Officer Stevens
- Natalie Shaw as Gabby
- Mark St. Amant as Mr. Weiner
- Emily Tudor as Elly
- Nicole Tudor as Nikkita
- Brittany Wagner as Izzy
- Jett Weinstein as Timmy
