= Kiss and Cry (film) =

2017 film

- Film poster
- Directed by: Sean Cisterna
- Written by: Willem Wennekers
- Produced by: Sean Cisterna; Jay Deverett; Jeff Deverett; Avi Federgreen
- Starring: Sarah Fisher; Luke Bilyk; Chantal Kreviazuk; Sergio Di Zio; Zoë Belkin
- Cinematography: Scott McClellan
- Edited by: Michelle Szemberg
- Music by: Carley Allison; Casey Manierka-Quaile
- Production company: Mythic Productions
- Distributed by: Indiecan Entertainment; 9 Story Media Group
- Release date: 4 February 2017
- Running time: 95 minutes
- Country: Canada
- Language: English

Kiss and Cry is a 2017 Canadian biopic directed by Sean Cisterna. The film depicts the life of Carley Allison who suffered from a rare form of cancer. It was filmed at various real locations, such as Carley’s house and bedroom, skating rink, classrooms and hospitals in Toronto.

The film stars Carley’s real-life friend Sarah Fisher. Throughout the film, Fisher breaks the fourth wall, using the very words from the real Allison’s blog posts and YouTube performances. The letter Carley writes and addresses to “cancer” is also partly her actual words.

It was released on February 10, 2017.

== Plot ==
Carley Elle Allison (Sarah Fisher) is a 17-year-old competitive figure skater in Toronto. Her motto is "always smile" or "find a reason to be happy". She has a lot going for her: she is working to gain a place on Canada’s national team, and gaining momentum, she enjoys singing, has a great family and friends, and at a party, she meets John, a handsome and sweet guy (Luke Bilyk) from her biology class.

Just as things seem to be going well, they suddenly get worse. Carley starts to feel sick; she begins to experience a severe shortage of breath, which is initially dismissed as asthma. The inhaler she is prescribed doesn’t fix her difficulty breathing, so a doctor runs some tests. After collapsing on a date with John, she's taken to the hospital, where doctors find a rare form of cancerous tumor (melanoma) outside her trachea. Determined to beat the illness, Carly first undergoes tracheal surgery and weeks later, chemotherapy.

Carley deals with "this little setback in my life” with a positive view always. Her family can find humor while changing a tracheostomy tube. One day, when John stays at her parents’ to make dinner, she loses a lock of hair. She warns him it will only get worse and that if he decides to stay, he must stay positive. He declares his love for her.

Some days later, Carley records her vlog bald, and directly afterwards, John asks her to the prom outside her window with a drum set. She takes him to the rink to teach him to skate. As they are leaving, she bumps into two of her former skating teammates and gets rebuffed by one of them. Selena Gomez gives her encouragement on her YouTube video soon after.

Once back at school, she is welcomed back with many messages of love and encouragement. Then, she comes across a fundraising event for cancer research, Haircuts for Cancer. She does a television interview, where she puts forth her mentality to treat cancer like a contact sport, to keep moving so it can’t get her. John and Carley go to the prom together and are intimate for the first time.

As time passes, Carley’s hair grows back. She’s had the tumor removed and is told, "So far, so good." Months later, she goes back to skating. She is offered to sing "O Canada" to open a televised NHL game. John brings his Greek family to her house for dinner.

A few months later, Carley is rediagnosed with extremely rare clear cell sarcoma in her lungs. John and Carley reaffirm their love for one another, but she succumbs to the disease later that year at 19. Carley’s Angels Foundation was founded in her honor to help with covering high medical costs.

== Cast ==
- Sarah Fisher as Carley Allison
- Luke Bilyk as John Servinis
- Chantal Kreviazuk as May Allison
- Sergio Di Zio as Mark Allison
- Denis Akiyama as Shin Amano
- Julia Tomasone as Samantha Allison
- Brittany Bristow as Riley Allison
- Zoë Belkin as Rebecca
- Lauren Esdale as Olivia
- Naomi Snieckus as Sophie Wexner
