= Jesse Metcalfe =

American actor (born 1978)

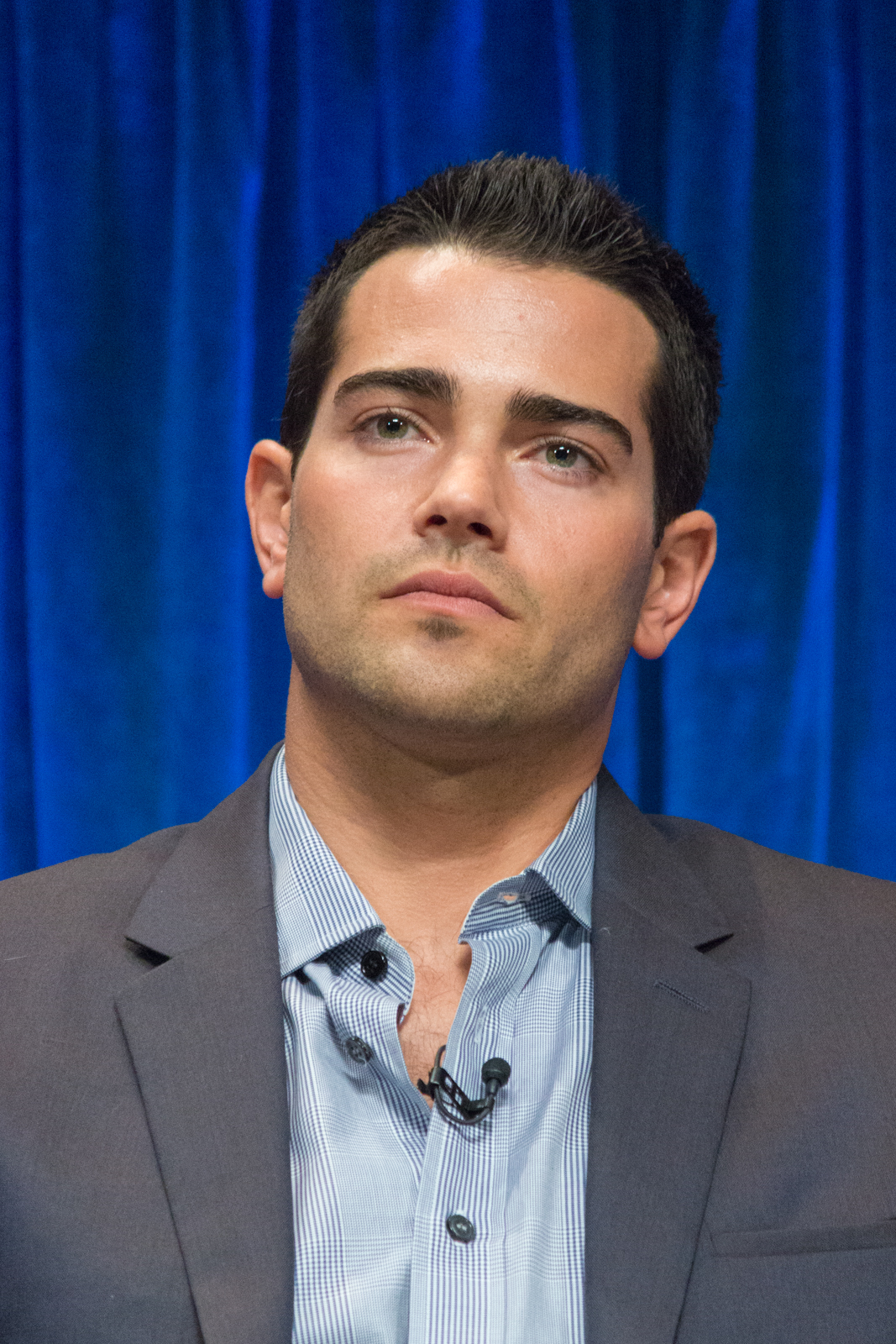
- Metcalfe at the PaleyFest 2013 forum for Dallas
- Born: Jesse Eden Metcalfe; December 9, 1978 (age 47); Carmel Valley Village, California, U.S.
- Occupation: Actor
- Years active: 1999–present

Jesse Eden Metcalfe (born December 9, 1978) is an American actor. Metcalfe is known for his roles as Miguel Lopez-Fitzgerald in the NBC soap opera Passions (1999–2004), John Rowland in the ABC comedy drama Desperate Housewives (2004–2007; 2009), and the title role in John Tucker Must Die (2006). He also starred as Christopher Ewing in the TNT continuation of Dallas (2012–2014), based on the 1978 series of the same name, and Trace Riley in Hallmark Channel's hit series Chesapeake Shores (2016–2021).

== Early life ==
Metcalfe was born in Carmel Valley Village, California, the son of Nancy (née DeMaio) and Jeff Metcalfe. He is of Italian and French descent on his father's side, while his mother is of Italian and Portuguese descent. Metcalfe played in several basketball leagues during his teen years in Waterford, Connecticut, and graduated from The Williams School in New London, Connecticut. He dropped out of New York University once he booked the part of Miguel Lopez-Fitzgerald on the soap opera Passions.

== Career ==
=== 1999–2009: Beginnings and breakthrough ===
Metcalfe played the role of Miguel Lopez-Fitzgerald on the NBC soap opera Passions from the show's debut in July 1999. It was announced in March 2004 that he would not be renewing his contract with the series, and his final airdate was in July 2004.

In October 2004, Metcalfe starred in the ABC comedy-drama series Desperate Housewives as teen gardener John Rowland, who is involved in an affair with married housewife Gabrielle Solis (Eva Longoria). In 2005, Metcalfe won the "Choice TV Breakout Performance: Male" award at the Teen Choice Awards for his role on the show. For a brief period Metcalfe juggled both Passions and Desperate Housewives roles before leaving Passions to focus on Desperate Housewives full-time. Following the first season, creator Marc Cherry revealed Metcalfe would return to the series on a recurring basis. Metcalfe made his final appearance as a special guest star on the show in October 2009.

In 2005, Metcalfe played a young high schooler in the music video for the song "Let Me Go" by 3 Doors Down.

In July 2006, Metcalfe played the titular character in the 20th Century Fox comedy film John Tucker Must Die. The film, which starred Sophia Bush, Brittany Snow, Arielle Kebbel, and R&B singer Ashanti, followed four friends who set out to break the heart of a serial cheater by setting him up with the new girl in town. Filming took place in Vancouver on a budget of $18 million. The film and Metcalfe's performance received mixed reviews and went on to make over $68,824,526 worldwide. To promote the film, Metcalfe hosted an episode of the British TV chat show The Paul O'Grady Show in October, due to O'Grady's being unwell.

In July 2008, Metcalfe starred in the horror film Insanitarium portraying the protagonist, Jack. The film, which centers on a young man trying to break his sister out of a mental institution, was filmed in August and September 2007. The film received negative reviews though Metcalfe's performance received positive reviews from the few critics who reviewed the film. That same year Metcalfe starred in The Other End of the Line as the romantic interest Granger Woodruff. The film was released in October and went on to make over $507,534 worldwide on a limited theatrical release in selected countries.

In February 2008, Variety announced Metcalfe would star alongside Michael Douglas and Amber Tamblyn in the remake of the 1956 film Beyond a Reasonable Doubt. Filming took place in Los Angeles the following month. The film suffered distribution problems and suffered numerous push-backs. The film was released in September 2009 to universally negative reviews. The film, which made over $3 million worldwide, failed to surpass its $25 million budget.

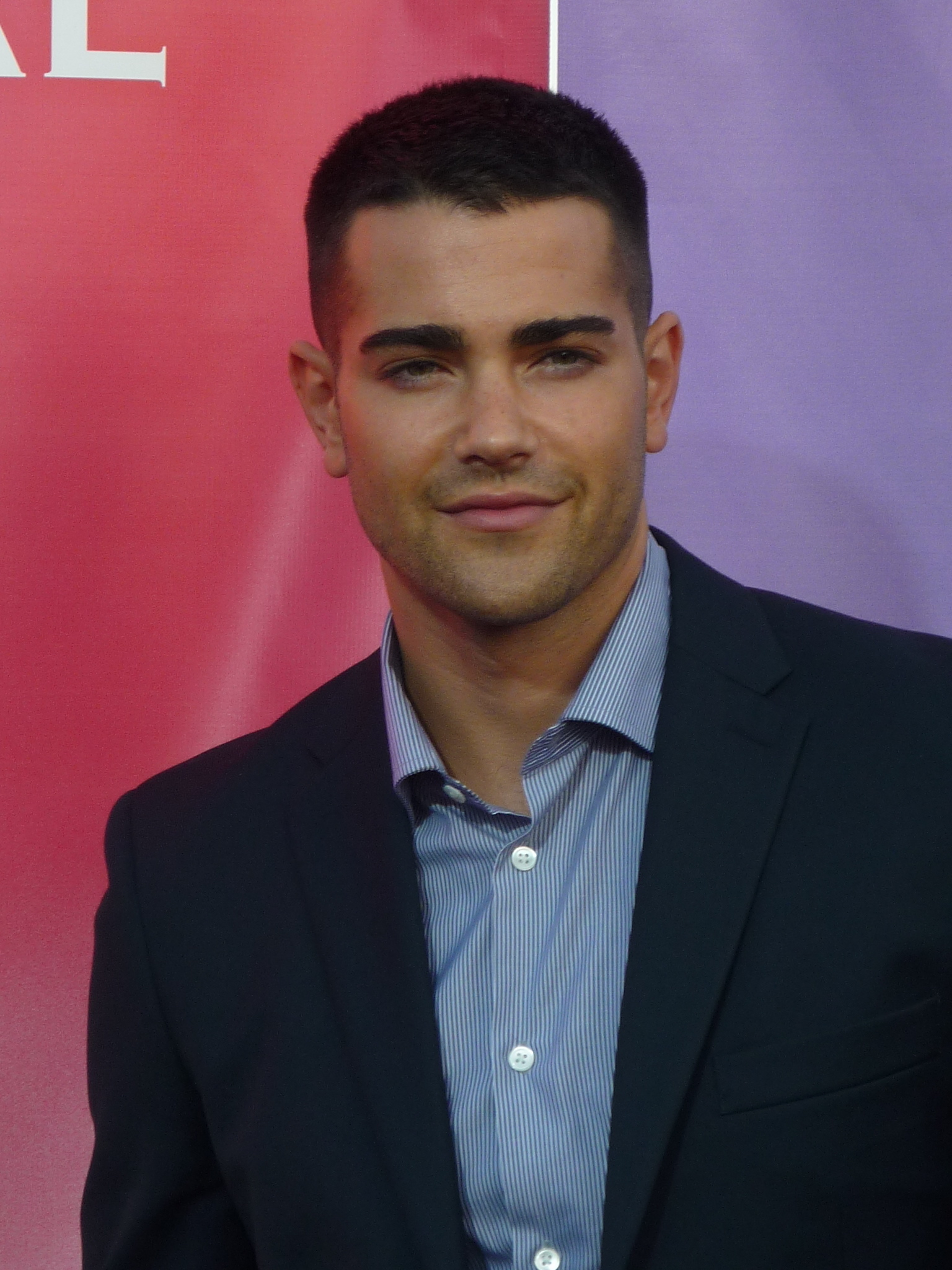
Metcalfe at NBC Universal's 2010 Television Critics Association Summer Party

=== 2010–present: Primary work in television ===
In February 2010, Metcalfe was cast in the NBC crime drama series Chase. The pilot was shot in March that same year in Houston, Texas. On May 10, 2010, NBC picked up an eighteen-episode first season. The series centers on a fugitive-apprehension team based outside of Houston, Texas, who track down dangerous criminals. The series premiered on September 20, 2010, to 7.31 million viewers and mixed reviews from critics. The series did not return for a second season due to low ratings. In September 2010, Metcalfe starred as Noah McManus in Hallmark movie Fairfield Road alongside Natalie Lisinska.

In February 2011, Metcalfe was confirmed to star in the TNT drama series Dallas. The series continued the Dallas series that premiered in 1978 and went on for 14 seasons. In July 2011, TNT picked up the pilot and ordered a ten-episode first season. Both Jordana Brewster and Josh Henderson were confirmed to star. Metcalfe portrayed Christopher Ewing, a role that originated in the original series in which it was played by various child actors. The series premiered on June 13, 2012, to 6.86 million viewers and generally favorable reviews from critics. Dallas was canceled on October 3, 2014, after three seasons.

In 2015, Metcalfe had a lead role as Chase Carter in the movie Dead Rising: Watchtower based on Capcom's videogame franchise. Metcalfe also starred as Bradley Suttons in Hallmark movie A Country Wedding. The film premiered to 2.2 million total viewers on Hallmark Movies & Mysteries. In 2016, Metcalfe starred in the Christian drama film God's Not Dead 2, as Tom Endler, a lawyer who defends a Christian teacher who struggles between giving up her faith or giving up her job.

On June 20, 2016, Metcalfe reprises his role as investigative reporter Chase Carter in the sequel Dead Rising: Endgame. Metcalfe starred as Trace Riley in Hallmark Channel's series Chesapeake Shores alongside Meghan Ory. The show premiered August 14, 2016. In addition to playing the character Trace, Metcalfe performs and composes some of the songs used in the series' episodes. He played the role of officer Holder and Dylan Holder in the drama film Destined.

In 2017, Metcalfe starred as Eric Redford in the Hallmark movie Christmas Next Door alongside Fiona Gubelmann. The film premiered to more than 4.4 million viewers, becoming top 10 cable program. In 2018, Metcalfe played the role of Luke in the action thriller Escape Plan 2: Hades. He also starred as Brady in the horror thriller film The Ninth Passenger. In 2019, Metcalfe starred in the Hallmark channel Christmas film Christmas Under the Stars co-starring Autumn Reeser.

In January 2020, Metcalfe began starring in the Martha's Vineyard Mysteries series on the Hallmark Movies & Mysteries channel as retired Boston detective Jeff Jackson. On September 2, 2020, Metcalfe was announced as one of the celebrities competing on the 29th season of Dancing with the Stars. He finished 12th place alongside his partner Sharna Burgess. In 2022, Metcalfe appeared on the second series of the British version of The Masked Dancer as "Astronaut". In 2026, Metcalfe appeared in the Roku original film Summer Sparks.

== Personal life ==
In March 2006, Metcalfe began dating singer Nadine Coyle of the British girl group Girls Aloud, after meeting in Sydney, Australia. They broke up in April 2008.

In March 2007, Metcalfe entered a rehabilitation facility to seek treatment for alcoholism. In November 2008, he hosted the World Music Awards in Monaco, while at the after-party for the ceremony, Metcalfe fell thirty feet (9 m) to the ground from a second-story balcony. He fractured his fibula but avoided more serious injury.

In 2013, Metcalfe was entered into the Toyota Pro/Celebrity Race, but ultimately did not start the race.

Metcalfe met Cara Santana in 2009. They were engaged in August 2016. The couple ended their engagement and broke up in January 2020.

Since 2023, Metcalfe has been in a relationship with real estate agent Helene Immel.

== Filmography ==
=== Film ===
Year	Title	Role	Notes
2006	John Tucker Must Die	John Tucker	Film debut
2008	Loaded	Tristan Price	
2008	Insanitarium	Jack	Direct-to-video film
2008	The Other End of the Line	Granger Woodruff	
2009	Beyond a Reasonable Doubt	Christopher John "C. J." Nicholas	
2010	The Tortured	Craig Landry	
2015	Dead Rising: Watchtower	Chase Carter	
2016	God's Not Dead 2	Tom Endler	
2016	Dead Rising: Endgame	Chase Carter	
2016	Destined	Dylan Holder	
2018	Escape Plan 2: Hades	Luke Graves	
2018	The Ninth Passenger	Brady	
2020	Cover Me	Richie Howell	
2020	Hard Kill	Derek Miller	
2021	Fortress	Paul Michaels	
2022	Fortress: Sniper's Eye	Paul Michaels	
2022	Queen of Manhattan	Carley	
2023	On a Wing and a Prayer	Kari Sorenson	
2023	Divine Influencer	Andrew Geller	
2024	Clear Cut	Eli	
2025	The Comic Shop	Mike	
2026	Boris is Dead	Wayne	
2026	Summer Sparks	Adam Fox	Roku Streaming Film

=== Television ===
Year	Title	Role	Notes
1999–2004	Passions	Miguel Lopez-Fitzgerald	Contract role
2003	44 Minutes: The North Hollywood Shoot-Out	Uniform	Television film (FX)
2003–2004	Smallville	Van McNulty	Episodes: "Extinction", "Asylum"
2004–2007, 2009	Desperate Housewives	John Rowland	Recurring role; 30 episodes
2010	Fairfield Road	Noah McManus	Television film (Hallmark Channel)
2010–2011	Chase	Luke Watson	Primary role; 18 episodes
2012–2014	Dallas	Christopher Ewing	Primary role; 40 episodes
2014	2 Broke Girls	Sebastian	Episode: "And the DJ Face"
2015	A Country Wedding	Bradley Sutton	Television film (Hallmark Channel)
2016–2021	Chesapeake Shores	Trace Riley	Primary role; 37 episodes
2017	Christmas Next Door	Eric Redford	Television film (Hallmark Channel)
2019	Christmas Under the Stars	Nick Bellwith	Television film (Hallmark Channel)
2020	A Beautiful Place to Die: A Martha's Vineyard Mystery	Jeff Jackson	Television film (Hallmark Mystery)
2020	Riddled with Deceit: A Martha's Vineyard Mystery	Jeff Jackson	Television film (Hallmark Mystery)
2020	Dancing with the Stars	Himself	Contestant (season 29)
2021	Ships in the Night: A Martha's Vineyard Mystery	Jeff Jackson	Television film (Hallmark Mystery)
2021	Poisoned in Paradise: A Martha's Vineyard Mystery	Jeff Jackson	Television film (Hallmark Mystery)
2022	Harmony from the Heart	Dr. Blake Williams	Television film (Great American Family)
2022	The Masked Dancer	Astronaut	Contestant (series 2)
2023	V.C. Andrews' Dawn	Ormand Longchamp	Television film (Lifetime)
2025	Law & Order	Sgt. Danny DeLuca	Episode: "Folk Hero"
2026	Absolutely Devoted to You	Derrick	Television film (Hallmark Channel)

=== Music video ===
Year	Title	Artist	Role
2005	"Let Me Go"	3 Doors Down	High school student
2006	"Hey Kid"	Matt Willis	Jesse Metcalfe

== Awards and nominations ==
Year	Award	Category	Work	Result
2000	Soap Opera Digest Awards	Favorite Teen Star	Passions	Nominated
2005	Screen Actors Guild Awards	Outstanding Performance by an Ensemble in a Comedy Series	Desperate Housewives	Won
2005	Teen Choice Awards	Choice TV Breakout Performance: Male	Desperate Housewives	Won
2005	Teen Choice Awards	Choice TV Actor: Comedy	Desperate Housewives	Nominated
2005	Teen Choice Awards	Choice Male Hottie		Nominated
