= Blizzard (2003 film) =

- DVD cover
- Directed by: LeVar Burton
- Written by: Agnes Bristow; Leif Bristow; Murray McRae
- Produced by: Leif Bristow; J. Miles Dale; Murray Marchant (associate); Robert Schwartz (executive); Ralph Winter (executive)
- Starring: Brenda Blethyn; Christopher Plummer; Kevin Pollak; Whoopi Goldberg; Brittany Bristow; Zoe Warner
- Cinematography: David Franco
- Edited by: Ralph Brunjes
- Music by: Mark McKenzie; Pamela Phillips Oland
- Production companies: Knightscove Entertainment; Holedigger Films; Ralph Winter Productions
- Distributed by: Alliance Atlantis Releasing (Canada); MGM Home Entertainment (United States)
- Release date: 15 May 2003 (Cannes)
- Running time: 93 minutes
- Countries: United States; Canada
- Language: English

Blizzard is a 2003 American/Canadian Christmas-themed family film directed by LeVar Burton and starring Brenda Blethyn, Christopher Plummer, Kevin Pollak, and Whoopi Goldberg.

== Plot ==
Ten-year-old Jess Cameron is heartbroken after her friend Bobby Jackson moves out of town. Her mother's Aunt Millie comes to visit and tells her a story about ten-year-old Katie Andrews who has a passion for ice skating.

Katie befriends Otto Brewer, a former Olympic skating champion, who offers to teach her "proper skating" after noticing that Katie is wearing hockey skates instead of ice skating skates. On her birthday, Katie receives a pair of used yellow ice skates, which she adores. Under Otto's tutelage and donning the yellow ice skates, Katie practices on an outdoor rink near her home.

At the North Pole, Santa and his elves are celebrating the birth of Blizzard, a reindeer with an unusual appearance. Blizzard befriends Donner Jr., a reindeer who admires her carefree personality and is impressed by her possessing all three magical reindeer gifts: the ability to fly, the power to make herself invisible, and the gift of empathic navigation - being able to see with her heart. Blizzard also befriends Jeremy, an elf who is mindful of her not getting into trouble with Archimedes, Santa's head elf, and Aphrodite, a reindeer who abides by the North Pole's strict rules.

Katie's family and Otto watch her performance as she blossoms into a magnificent skater. However, Katie's father loses his job. The family is forced to move to the city, leaving Katie devastated after she and Otto say their final goodbyes. After settling in their new apartment, Katie's unruly brothers, Jack and Joe, destroy her beloved music box which heavily saddens her.

Blizzard is interrupted in a game of tag by her empathic navigation ability. She hears Katie's sorrow and sees her looking distraught at her music box smashed into pieces. Despite Blizzard wanting to investigate, Jeremy warns Blizzard that contacting humans can lead her into serious trouble. Ignoring Jeremy's warning, Blizzard flies to Katie's apartment. They quickly become friends and enjoy a night of flying and ice skating together. The next morning, Katie discovers a private skating club at her new school. She is caught spying by snobbish upper-class Erin who wants Katie to prove that she can skate. Miss Ward, the club's coach, observes Katie and allows her to compete in the city championship. On the night before Katie's program, Blizzard visits Katie to wish her good luck. As Katie begins to skate, she realizes her skates are ruined. Blizzard flies Katie to the North Pole and brings her to Jeremy's home to take refuge. Blizzard, using her gift of invisibility, sneaks into a shop to borrow a pair of ice skates. As they fly back to the skating rink, Aphrodite apprises Archimedes of Blizzard bringing a human to the North Pole and stealing another child's Christmas toy which can risk her being banished from the North Pole.

Katie becomes a qualifier for the regional competition. Her mother receives a phone call from Miss Ward that Erin went missing. Blizzard and Katie find Erin and help save her from drowning in a thin-iced frozen pond. Blizzard returns to the North Pole only to accidentally leave the borrowed skates behind. Archimedes takes Blizzard to her paddock, rendering her unable to fly back to Katie. Jeremy and Donner Jr. fly to Katie's apartment. Katie flies back to the North Pole with the skates and to explain to Santa that Blizzard broke the rules to help her. Santa reprieves Blizzard of banishment with the consequence of Blizzard and Katie never being able to see each other again. Blizzard and Katie have their last flight back to Katie's apartment.

Aunt Millie helps Jess learn that the value of true friendships is that they never truly go away. It is revealed that Aunt Mille's luggage is marked with the initials M.K.A. - Mildred Katie Andrews.

== Cast ==
- Paul Bates as additional reindeer voices
- Brenda Blethyn as Aunt Millie
- Brittany Bristow as Erin Scott-Pierce
- Leif Bristow as Blitzen (voice)
- Jacqueline Byers as Skating girl (as Jackie Byers)
- Len Carlson as Additional reindeer voices
- J. Miles Dale as Additional reindeer voices
- Tony Daniels as Additional reindeer voices
- Wendii Fulford as Beth Cameron
- Whoopi Goldberg as Blizzard (voice)
- Ellen-Ray Hennessy as Delphi (voice)
- Gary Johnston as Mr. Jackson
- Demetrius Joyette as Bobby Jackson
- Stephanie Morgenstern as Erma Ward
- J.D. Nicholsen as Ted Andrews
- Aidan O'Hara as Derek Tynan
- Jennifer Pisana as Jess Cameron
- Christopher Plummer as Santa Claus
- Kevin Pollak as Archimedes
- Diana Reis as Principal Sarah Andrews
- Mark Rendall as Joe Andrews
- Albert Schultz as Bob Cameron
- Lee Smart as Donner Jr. (voice)
- Cree Summer as Aphrodite (voice)
- Jan Tríska as Otto Brewer / Trainer
- Zoe Warner as Katie Andrews
- Jonathan Whitaker as Jordan Scott-Pierce
- Jonathan Wilson as Jeremy
- Richard Yearwood as Lucius
- LeVar Burton as Night Watchman Elf (uncredited)
- Marie V. Cruz as Santa's Elf (uncredited)

Josh Kirk as Young Reindeer

== Awards ==
The film won the Best of the Fest award at the Chicago International Children's Film Festival, and the DGC Team Award from the Directors Guild of Canada. It premiered at the Cannes Film Festival on May 15, 2003.

== See also ==
- List of Christmas films
