= The Bride He Bought Online =

2015 American television thriller film

- Official poster
- Directed by: Christine Conradt
- Written by: Christine Conradt
- Produced by: Robert Ballo; Ken Sanders
- Starring: Annalisa Cochrane; Anne Winters; Alexandra Paul; Jamie Luner
- Cinematography: Roberto Schein
- Edited by: Josh Muscatine
- Music by: Richard Bowers
- Production companies: Reel One Entertainment; Pender Street Pictures
- Distributed by: Lifetime Television; Reel One Entertainment
- Release dates: May 24, 2015 (Canada); July 18, 2015 (United States)
- Running time: 90 minutes
- Country: United States
- Language: English

The Bride He Bought Online is a 2015 American television thriller film, written and directed by Christine Conradt, and starring Anne Winters, Alexandra Paul, and Jamie Luner. It was broadcast on the Lifetime network in the United States on July 18, 2015.

== Plot ==
What starts out as a harmless online prank takes a dark turn for 17-year-old Avery Lindstrom (Anne Winters) when her best friends, Mandy Kim (Lauren Gaw) and Kaley Mack (Annalisa Cochrane), create a fake profile for an international dating website and begin to communicate with a lonely, socially inept computer programmer named John Bennett (Travis Hammer). Having lived a life of isolation and bullying, John becomes consumed by his desire for revenge after learning he was catfished by the girls. Doing some digging online, John finds that the photo of his nonexistent "girlfriend" was actually that of a deceased Filipina model, then uncovers the identities of the three girls who played him like a fool on their blog with their cruel prank. While both Avery and Mandy feel bad for what they did to him and show some remorse, Kaley doesn't, being the "mean girl" of their school.

John decides to get back at the girls by hiring a good-looking guy about their age name Nick (Randy Blekitas). Nick is a male prostitute, and John tells him he is playing a trick on his niece, and wants him to get the three girls to fall for him and then stand them up. John finds their hangout, the Skatelab skate park, and sends Nick there to flirt with them. The plan works well, as both Kaley and Mandy express interest and give him their phone numbers.

Nick tells the girls he had just moved from Pittsburgh, and they invite him to a party that Avery is throwing. Though he fails to show, Nick then sends a text message inviting Kaley and Mandy to Skatelab (which was actually sent by John), and when they arrive, it seems as though no one is there. John kidnaps Mandy outside the hangout first, which Kaley initially thinks is a practical joke being pulled by Mandy or Avery. Kaley returns to the party and plays a practical joke on Avery's crush Trevor, pouring water on the crotch of his pants, then posts video of the prank on their blog. At this point, Avery has had enough of Kaley and ends their friendship.

Upon returning home, Kaley turns on the TV, but John uses his computer hacking skills to scare her by turning off the security system in Kaley's home. Having succeeded in panicking her, he then enters the house and kidnaps Kaley at gunpoint, taking her to the warehouse where he is holding Mandy hostage. The next day, Avery is being interviewed by an agent, as the parents of Kaley and Mandy are looking for their daughters. Avery tells the agent about Nick, and the cops mark him as a suspect. Nick speaks to the cop, straightening everything out and telling him about John.

Later that day, Avery is also kidnapped by John, and having now captured all three girls, he takes them to sell to a man he found online. The man is going to sell the girls for human trafficking. However, John gets scammed by the man, who only takes Kaley with him. Afterwards, John takes Mandy and Avery back to the warehouse, where Avery slashes him with a piece of glass and tries to escape, but is unsuccessful. Upon returning home, John's hooker neighbor, Wanda, offers to find him someone else to sell the girls to, and the pair return to the warehouse. However, instead of aiding John in his trafficking attempt, Wanda shoots him in the arm, allowing Mandy and Avery to escape. John then retaliates by shooting Wanda in the chest and tries to find and recapture the girls, but is unable to due to his injuries, while the girls hide in the warehouse, armed with the neighbor's gun and a cell phone. They call the police and are saved, though a defeated John commits suicide in despair before he can be arrested.

As the film ends, Avery is in the hospital, being questioned by law enforcement. The final scene shows her taking things out of Kaley's locker, while Avery's voice-over explains that Kaley was never found.

== Cast ==
- Anne Winters as Avery Lindstrom
- Travis Hammer as John Bennett
- Annalisa Cochrane as Kaley Mack
- Lauren Gaw as Mandy Kim
- Alexandra Paul as Kathy Schumaker
- Jamie Luner as Rihanne Lindstrom
- Chase Austin as Trevor Lansing
- Kesia Elwin as Wanda
- Randy Blekitas as Nick

== Release ==
The film first had a limited release in Canada on May 24, 2015. It was then broadcast on the Lifetime network in the United States on July 18, 2015.
