= Adam's Testament =

- Directed by: Jason Barbeck; Rafael Kalamat
- Written by: Jason Barbeck; Rafael Kalamat
- Produced by: Jason Barbeck; Rafael Kalamat
- Starring: Philip Moran; Luke Bilyk; Nick Mancuso; Frank Chiesurin; Zoé De Grand Maison
- Cinematography: Marc Forand
- Edited by: Simone Smith
- Music by: Nicholas Schnier
- Production company: Reel Deal Guys Entertainment
- Distributed by: Bridgestone Multimedia
- Release date: April 18, 2017 (Canada)
- Running time: 113 minutes
- Country: Canada
- Language: English

Adam's Testament is a 2017 Canadian drama film directed by Jason Barbeck and Rafael Kalamat. It premiered in theaters of Canada on April 18, 2017. The film stars Philip Moran, Luke Bilyk, Nick Mancuso, Frank Chiesurin and Zoé De Grand Maison.

== Plot ==
After the tragic death of his mother, Adam takes refuge even more in music with his band and his girlfriend. His father, Joseph, who works as a detective, is faced with the mission of saving Adam's soul, since angels and demons disguise themselves as humans. This ancient spiritual war between good and evil will put Adam's faith to the test, while an unknown being full of darkness descends to Toronto to further damage this war.

== Cast ==
- Philip Moran as Joseph Gable
- Luke Bilyk as Adam Gable
- Nick Mancuso as The Stranger
- Frank Chiesurin as Archangel Michael
- Zoé De Grand Maison as Katia
- Kate Drummond as Katherine Gable
- Art Hindle as Father Callaghan

== Production ==
On July 6, 2015, it was announced that Jason Barbeck and Rafael Kalamat would direct and produce a supernatural thriller film Adam's Testament and they hired a group of Ryerson University students to be part of the film's technical team. It was also announced that it was starring Luke Bilyk and Zoé De Grand Maison. Later they joined the main cast Philip Moran, Nick Mancuso, Kate Drummond, Art Hindle and Frank Chiesurin. Principal photography on the film finish on July 30, 2015 in Toronto, Ontario.

== Reception ==
=== Critical response ===
The website dove.org has given Adam's Testament a positive review, calling it a "captivating film that portrays the spiritual conflicts between good and evil, the symbolism of the angels and the demons in this story convincingly illustrates the battle and the actors are so very powerful in their interpretation as effective in their roles".

=== Accolades ===
Year	Award	Category	Recipient(s) and nominee(s)	Result	Ref(s)
2017	InFame Awards	Media Artist of the Year	Philip Moran	Nominated	
2017	International Christian Film Festival	Best Director	Jason Barbeck & Rafael Kalamat	Nominated	
2017	International Christian Film Festival	Best Lead Actor	Luke Bilyk	Nominated	
2017	International Christian Film Festival	Best Supporting Actress	Zoé De Grand Maison	Won	
