= Mom and Dad (2017 film) =

2017 comedy horror film

- Theatrical release poster
- Directed by: Brian Taylor
- Written by: Brian Taylor
- Produced by: Christopher Lemole; Tim Zajaros; Brian Taylor
- Starring: Nicolas Cage; Selma Blair; Anne Winters; Zackary Arthur; Robert T. Cunningham; Lance Henriksen
- Cinematography: Daniel Pearl
- Edited by: Rose Corr; Fernando Villena
- Music by: Mr. Bill
- Production companies: Armory Films; XYZ Films; The Fyzz Facility
- Distributed by: Momentum Pictures (United States); Vertigo Films (United Kingdom)
- Release dates: September 9, 2017 (TIFF); January 19, 2018 (United States); March 9, 2018 (United Kingdom)
- Running time: 83 minutes
- Countries: United Kingdom; United States
- Language: English
- Budget: $4 million
- Box office: $286,313

Mom and Dad is a 2017 black comedy horror film written and directed by Brian Taylor. Starring Nicolas Cage and Selma Blair, the film premiered at the 2017 Toronto International Film Festival, and was theatrically released on January 19, 2018, by Momentum Pictures. The plot follows incidents where unexplained static causes parents to kill their children. A joint British and American production, the film underperformed at the box office but received generally positive reviews from critics.

== Plot ==
Static plays on a car's infotainment system. A mother in a suburban town puts on music for her child as she parks her car on railroad tracks and leaves the child in the car to die.

The Ryans are a family of four with a strained relationship. Brent, the father, does not approve of his daughter Carly's new boyfriend Damon. He is also going through a slight mid-life crisis as he has apparently been working on a muscle car in the garage. Carly considers her mother Kendall out of touch, fights with her younger brother Joshua, and is currently upset about canceling plans with her boyfriend because her grandparents are coming to visit. Kendall is trying to find hobbies that occupy her time such as taking fitness classes. She is also anticipating the delivery of her sister's new baby.

While Carly is at school, radios and TV screens start transmitting unexplained static. The effect is seen as the Ryans' housekeeper murders her own daughter in front of a terrified Joshua. Meanwhile, a mob of parents rushes to Carly's school to kill their children. When the students see one classmate being stabbed by his mother with her car keys after he scales a fence to reach her, the students scatter – though many die at the hands of their parents.

Carly escapes with her friend Riley. They reach Riley's house, where Carly watches television reports of the mass hysteria, implying that the static is compelling parents across the U.S to slaughter their children; Dr. Oz is interviewed, telling people how it compares to savaging in pig populations. Upstairs, Riley's mother strangles her. Carly runs home in terror and finds Damon, whose father earlier tried to kill him with a broken bottle but accidentally cut his own throat. Damon accompanies Carly into the house to get Joshua somewhere safe.

Kendall goes to the hospital where her sister Jeannie is giving birth, and static is seen on a delivery room monitor, immediately followed by Jeannie attempting to kill her newborn daughter. Kendall tries to save the baby, escaping the hospital and heading home.

Seeing Carly at home with Damon, the hysteria overtakes Brent and he knocks Damon out and attacks Carly. Kendall joins him when she gets home. Carly and Joshua lock themselves in the basement and Kendall uses a Sawzall to get through the door. Brent digs out a case from under his bed but finds his gun is missing. Joshua pulls out Brent's gun and fires through the door, wounding his mother. Kendall and Brent, bonding over their shared filicidal desire, run a hose from their oven's natural gas line to the basement to poison the kids. Carly apparently notices the gas, so she rigs up a trap with matches at the door and hides with Joshua in the ventilation system. Brent cuts the lock off and opens the door, igniting the gas and triggering an explosion that knocks both parents out, just as Damon awakens.

Damon helps Carly and Joshua evade their parents, but Kendall awakens and knocks Damon out again. As the parents close in on their kids, the doorbell rings. When Brent opens the door, his own filicidal parents – Mel and Barbara – try to kill him. Everyone chases one another through the house: Joshua evades Brent by trying to hide from him in the garage; Kendall chases Carly and hits her on the head before her mother-in-law knocks her out.

As Brent tries to get Joshua out of the car, Joshua manages to start the car, and, in the struggle, Brent puts it in gear, eventually crashing it through the garage door, killing his parents and knocking himself out. Kendall prepares to finish Carly off, but Damon knocks her out with a shovel.

Kendall and Brent wake up to find themselves restrained in the basement with Carly, Joshua, and Damon watching them. They continue to exhibit symptoms of the hysteria, and the kids refuse to let them go. Kendall tearfully tells the children she loves them, and the film ends mid-sentence of Brent stating: "But sometimes we just want to—".

== Cast ==
- Nicolas Cage as Brent Ryan
- Selma Blair as Kendall Ryan
- Anne Winters as Carly Ryan
- Zackary Arthur as Joshua Ryan
- Robert T. Cunningham as Damon Hall
- Olivia Crocicchia as Riley
- Rachel Melvin as Jeannie
- Joseph D. Reitman as Homeroom Teacher
- Samantha Lemole as Jenna
- Marilyn Dodds Frank as Barbara Ryan
- Lance Henriksen as Mel Ryan
- Kris Jerome Flowers as E.R. Doctor

In addition, Mehmet Oz has a cameo appearance as himself. Grant Morrison appears as a television pundit. Edwin Lee Gibson appears as Damon's father. Bokeem Woodbine appears uncredited as a father being interviewed.

== Production ==
The film is a joint United Kingdom-United States production.

On February 12, 2016, Nicolas Cage was set to star in the film and June 22, 2016, saw Selma Blair sign on. Principal photography began in July 2016, and took place in Louisville, Kentucky.

== Release ==
The film premiered in the Midnight Madness section at the 2017 Toronto International Film Festival on September 9, 2017, and was theatrically released by Momentum Pictures on January 19, 2018.

== Reception ==
=== Box office ===
With a limited release, Mom and Dad grossed $286,313 at the box office, against a budget of $4 million.

=== Critical response ===
On the review aggregator website Rotten Tomatoes, 74% of 135 critics' reviews are positive, with an average rating of 6.0/10. The website's consensus reads: "Mom and Dad's gonzo premise serves as an effective springboard for a wickedly dark, bloody comedy—and an appropriately over-the-top performance from Nicolas Cage." Metacritic, which uses a weighted average, assigned the film a score of 59 out of 100, based on 31 critics, indicating "mixed or average" reviews.

Adam White of The Daily Telegraph gave the film 4/5 stars, saying that it was "Both a torrid exploitation cinema throwback, and a metaphor for a generation of kids screwed over by their elders." Tara Brady of The Irish Times also gave it 4/5 stars, writing: "Think back on the most unhinged screen moments of Nicolas Cage's career... Multiply all these scenes together and you still can't match the awesome lunacy of Nic Cage killing a pool table in the delightfully delirious Mom and Dad." Simran Hans of The Observer gave it 3/5 stars, writing: "Almost ugly ultra-HD, a dated dubstep soundtrack and ketchup-splatter special effects might make a lesser film less appealing, but here these lowbrow touches work to Mom and Dad's advantage." Bruce DeMara of the Toronto Star gave it 3.5/4 stars, calling it "a madly satisfying mélange of suspense and comedy, though perhaps not recommended for family viewing." Charlotte O'Sullivan of the Evening Standard called it "a hilarious, knowing bit of schlock about a plague that turns parents into predators", and wrote: "Mom and Dad is like Andrey Zvyagintsev's Loveless but with more dead people and far fewer trees."

Barry Hertz of The Globe and Mail gave it 1.5/4 stars, writing: "Nicolas Cage does crazy like no one else, but his descent into insanity here - not too far from how his character acts at the beginning of the film, really - can't elevate Taylor's juvenile take on adulthood." Kevin Maher of The Times gave it 2/5 stars, saying that its social satire was "briefly compelling", but added: "The 'joke' soon wears thin, however, and the film, with few actual ideas to express, resorts to slapdash plotting and dead-end gore." Rex Reed of The New York Observer gave it 0/4 stars, writing: "With an agonizing rupture of craft and common sense, it showcases a performance of screaming, over-the-top hysteria by Nicolas Cage that must be seen to be fully believed, but that is not a recommendation."

Director John Waters named the film as the fourth best of 2018.
