= Luke Bilyk =

Canadian actor (born 1994)

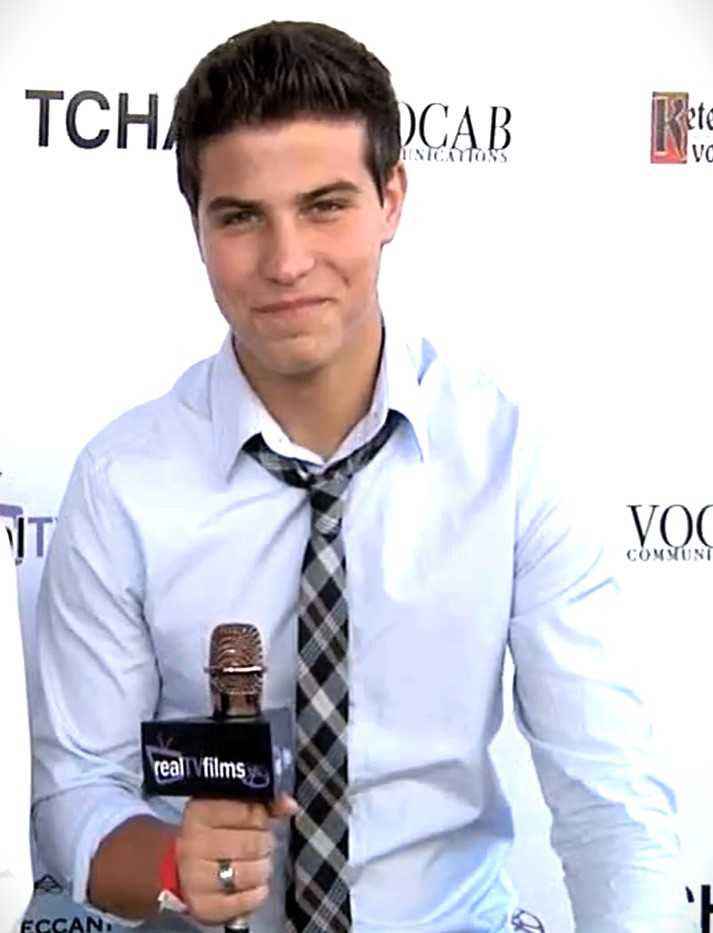
- Bilyk interviewed at the 2011 Toronto International Film Festival
- Born: Luke Barry Bilyk; November 10, 1994 (age 31); North York, Ontario, Canada
- Occupation: Actor
- Years active: 2005–present
- Children: 1

Luke Barry Bilyk (born November 10, 1994) is a Canadian actor. He is best known for his role as Drew Torres in Degrassi: The Next Generation, which he starred on from 2010 to 2015. He is also recognized for his roles in films such as Kiss and Cry (2017) and F the Prom (2017).

== Early life ==
Born in North York, Ontario, Canada, Bilyk grew up in nearby Vaughan, Ontario with three older sisters. He is of Italian, Ukrainian, German, and Jewish descent.

He attended the Toronto Academy of Acting for Film and Television.

== Career ==
Bilyk had a starring role as Drew Torres on Degrassi: The Next Generation on seasons 10 through 14. His character developed over time; starting as an immature jock and ending as class president with a promising future.

From 2014 to 2015, he played Mark in the supernatural drama series Lost Girl.

In 2017, he starred in the drama film Adam's Testament, earning him a Best Actor nomination from the International Christian Film & Music Festival. That same year, he starred in the teen comedy F the Prom as TJ.

In 2021, he starred in Blaine Thurier's Canadian horror comedy Kicking Blood. He went on to appear in the second season of the Amazon Prime action crime series Reacher as Calvin Franz.

== Personal life ==
In December 2021, Bilyk got engaged to director Nicole Dorsey, whom he has been dating since 2015. They have a son, Elliot Rae Bilyk, born in August 2022.

Luke is an active supporter of "Free the Children," and has traveled to India, Haiti, and Nicaragua with the charitable organization. Together with his Degrassi co-stars, he has helped build schools and to set up water filtration systems to provide safe drinking water for remote regions. In 2013, he was a special guest at the Count Me In Conference, an "empowerment event" promoting volunteerism and offering opportunities.

== Filmography ==
=== Film ===
Year	Title	Role	Notes
2009	Gooby	Cute Kid	
2015	Hellions	Jace	
2017	Kiss and Cry	John Servinis	
2017	Adam's Testament	Adam Gable	
2017	F the Prom	TJ	
2019	Black Conflux	Donovan	
2019	The Marijuana Conspiracy	Adam	
2021	Kicking Blood	Robbie	
2024	Balestra	Wade	

=== Television ===
Year	Title	Role	Notes
2007	Little Mosque on the Prairie	Halaqa Teen #1	Season 2, episode 7: "Best Intentions"
2008	The Latest Buzz	Teenager	Season 2, episode 6: "The Showdown Issue"
2009	The Jon Dore Television Show	Skateboard Kid #2	Season 2, episode 3: "Jon Gets Old"
2010	My Babysitter's a Vampire	The Seeker	TV movie
2010–2015	Degrassi	Andrew "Drew" Torres	Main role (seasons 10-14)
2011	Flashpoint	Joe Stanick	Season 4, episode 9: "The War Within"
2014–2015	Lost Girl	Mark	Recurring Role (season 5)
2016	Holiday Joy	Zack Hockstatter	TV movie
2016–2017	Raising Expectations	Adam Wayney	Main role
2018	Legends of Tomorrow	Elvis Presley / Jesse Presley	Season 3, episode 14: "Amazing Grace"
2020	Meet Me at Christmas	Liam	Hallmark TV movie
2020	A Teacher	Bear	Miniseries
2021	Good Witch	Sean	4 episodes
2022	The Porter	Franklin Edwards	8 episodes
2023–2024	Reacher	Calvin Franz	5 episodes
2025	Grey's Anatomy	Sam	1 episode

== Awards and nomination ==
Year	Title	Category	Work	Result	Notes
2017	International Christian Film Festival	Best Actor: Feature Film	Adam's Testament	Won	
