= True Guts =

2006 documentary film created by Josh Golder

True Guts: Struggle and Triumph over Crohn's Disease and Ulcerative Colitis is a documentary film created by Josh Golder to raise awareness for Crohn's disease (CD) and ulcerative colitis (UC), both of which are forms of Inflammatory Bowel Disease (IBD)

True Guts premiered in Boston on November 9, 2006, at the Loews Boston Common.

The film was also entered into the 2007 FREDDIE Awards. The FREDDIE Awards, also known as the International Health and Medical Media Awards, is a film festival launched in 1974 that has become the pre-eminent health and medical media competition.

True Guts won two FREDDIE Awards in the 2007 festival including its category, Inflammatory Diseases, and the Michael E. DeBakey, M.D. Award, which is give to the "finest educational entry of the year."
