= Degrassi Junior High =

Canadian teen drama television series (1987–1989)

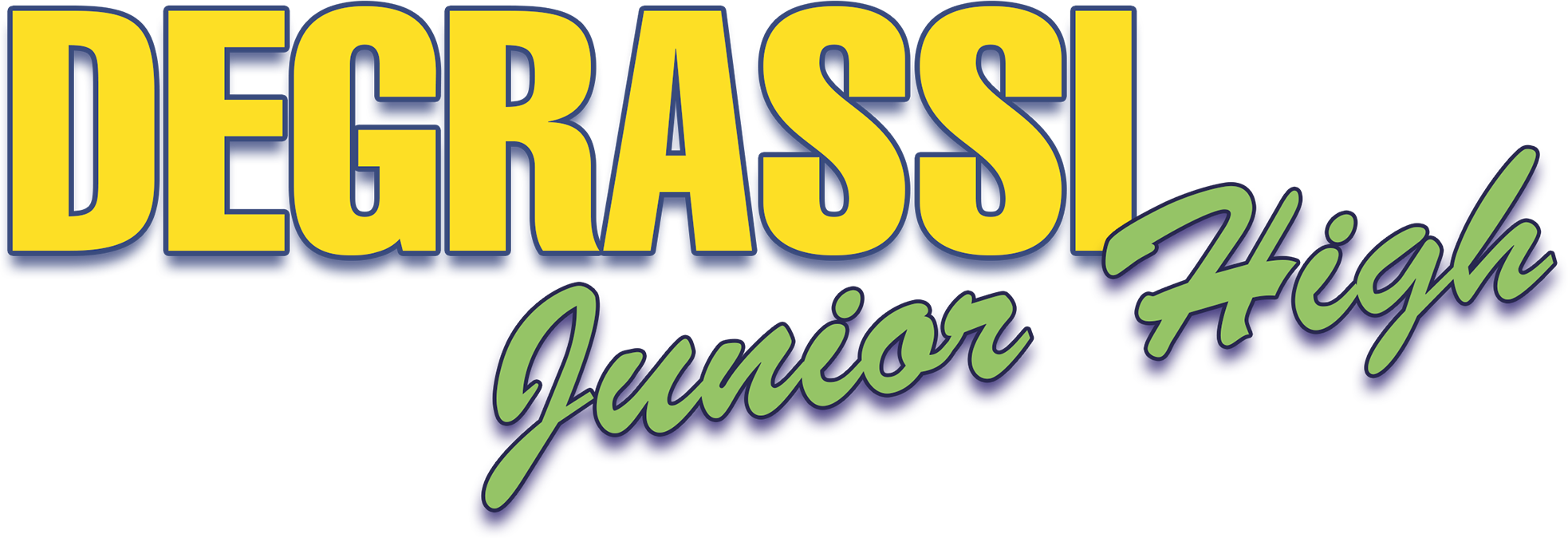
- The current official logo of Degrassi Junior High, used on DVD releases and other legacy promotional material.
- Genre: Teen drama
- Created by: Linda Schuyler; Kit Hood
- Written by: Scott Barrie; Kathryn Ellis; Avrum Jacobson; Michael Kennedy; Yan Moore; Susin Nielsen; John Oughton
- Starring: See list of characters
- Theme music composer: Wendy Watson
- Composers: Wendy Watson; Lewis Manne
- Country of origin: Canada
- Original language: English
- No. of seasons: 3
- No. of episodes: 42 (list of episodes)

Production
- Executive producer: Kate Taylor
- Producers: Linda Schuyler; Kate Taylor
- Production locations: Toronto, Canada
- Running time: 30 minutes (including commercials)
- Production company: Playing With Time, Inc.

Original release
- Network: CBC Television
- Release: January 18, 1987 – February 27, 1989

Related
- The Kids of Degrassi Street; Degrassi High; Degrassi: The Next Generation

Degrassi Junior High is a Canadian teen drama television series created by Linda Schuyler and Kit Hood. It is the second entry of the Degrassi television franchise after The Kids of Degrassi Street and aired on the CBC from January 18, 1987 to February 27, 1989, and on PBS in the United States starting from September 1987. The series follows those who attend the titular fictional school and the issues they face.

Produced by Schuyler and Hood's Playing With Time, development of the series began soon after the end of The Kids of Degrassi Street, in response to a perceived lack of teenage representation in media. Its cast mainly consisted of amateurs who were similar in age to the characters they played, a deliberate response to the trend of young adults being cast in teenage roles. The actors had extensive input in the writing process, and plots were often drawn from their real lives. It was filmed entirely on-location in Toronto, with then Daisy Avenue Public School in Etobicoke used as the school.

The series received widespread critical acclaim on release, with praise directed at its realism, cinematography, and portrayal of serious topics, and became a significant commercial success in Canada after it was moved to a prime-time spot, while it also developed cult followings in the United States and Australia. In its home country, it won eight Gemini Awards, including four in a single year. A sequel series, Degrassi High (1989–1991), continued to follow its characters into high school, and the franchise's revival and continuation with Degrassi: The Next Generation (2001–2015) was brought into motion by a successful 1999 televised cast reunion.

In spite of seldom mainstream acknowledgement, Degrassi Junior High is credited with being the progenitor of the teen drama and a major influence on series such as Beverly Hills, 90210, and continues to be highly regarded. In 2017, the Toronto International Film Festival named it one of Canada's most significant contributions to the cinematic landscape.

== Premise ==
Degrassi Junior High follows those who attend the titular fictional school, located in an unnamed North American town. The series deals with a wide range of subjects through its characters, including serious issues such as teenage pregnancy, abuse, bullying, racism, interracial dating, drugs, alcoholism, drunk driving, and eating disorders, as well as more mundane coming-of-age experiences, such as relationships, exams, and puberty.

Schuyler stated the series had a "double mandate to entertain and educate", and each episode was intended as a conversation starter. The series is set entirely from a teenage perspective. Additionally, adults have a small role in the series, usually never being present in a scene without a teenage character present, and the characters are portrayed navigating their own problems and making their own decisions, for better or for worse, with minimal adult intervention: "We're not looking for Father Knows Best."

The first two seasons encompass a full year, with some characters in Grade 7 and some in Grade 8, while season three takes place the following year, in which Grade 9, typically the start of high school in North America, is appended to the junior high school, which was in reality a creative decision to retain the entire cast. In season three, the grade 9 students attend a nearby high school, Borden High, part-time. In the final episode, a faulty boiler causes a fire that destroys the school building forces the characters to evacuate from their graduation dance.

The series is not a sequel to The Kids of Degrassi Street, as it features new characters, despite sharing some of the actors from that series.

== Cast ==
=== Repertory company ===
Degrassi Junior High did not have a fixed cast. In his book TV North, Peter Kenter writes that no official cast listing appears to exist. The series consisted of members of Playing With Time's repertory company, which originally comprised fifty-four kids, and later sixty-five in total. According to Kathryn Ellis, the unique casting system of Degrassi Junior High was so that every member of the repertory company had "equal status", although some characters were more prominent than others. Unlike the trend of casting young adults to play teenagers, Degrassi Junior High cast real age-appropriate actors who largely lacked acting experience. Because of its non-union status, none of the actors were members of unions. Crew members occasionally made background appearances, including art director Judy Shiner, picture editor Rob de Lint, and publicist Kathryn Ellis. Writer Susin Nielsen had a brief role in two episodes as a janitor.

Publicity photo of the Degrassi Junior High cast from season 3. Top row: Duncan Waugh, Stacie Mistysyn, Siluck Saysanasy, Pat Mastroianni, and Amanda Stepto. Bottom row: Christopher Charlesworth, Neil Hope, and Anais Granofsky.

=== Primary and secondary characters ===
- Nicole Stoffman as Stephanie Kaye (seasons 1–2), a popular girl who dresses in provocative clothing at school. She is school president during her tenure on the show, and faces backlash from other students because of her failure to deliver on her promises. Later, she unsuccessfully pursues Simon Dexter. This, as well as her parents' divorce, leads her to fall into a depression. Stoffman left the series after two seasons to star in the CTV sitcom Learning the Ropes.
- Niki Kemeny as Voula Grivogiannis (season 1), Stephanie's friend
- Pat Mastroianni as Joey Jeremiah, a class clown and a slacker who has a humorous and extroverted personality. He is the keyboardist of the band the Zit Remedy. His trademark attire consists of a fedora and Hawaiian shirts.
- Duncan Waugh as Arthur Kobalewscuy, Stephanie's younger brother
- Siluck Saysanasy as Yick Yu, Arthur's best friend. Of Vietnamese descent, Yick was initially ashamed of his background as a refugee and attempted to fabricate an alternative story for a show-and-tell assignment.
- Stefan Brogren as Archie "Snake" Simpson, Joey's friend and guitarist of the Zit Remedy. He is good-natured, but isn't hesitant to point out his friends' wrongdoings.
- Sarah Charlesworth as Susie Rivera (seasons 1–2), Caitlin's friend
- Neil Hope as Derek "Wheels" Wheeler, Joey and Snake's friend, and the bassist of the Zit Remedy. In season three, his parents are killed in a collision with a drunk driver.
- Billy Parrott as Shane McKay, Spike's former boyfriend and the father of Emma. He faces opposition from both his own parents and Spike herself. Later, he is found at the bottom of a bridge after having taken LSD for a rock concert, leaving him with permanent brain damage.
- Anais Granofsky as Lucy Fernandez, a relatively wealthy girl whose parents are never home, leading her to act out for attention.
- Angela and Maureen Deiseach as Erica and Heather Farrell, identical twin sisters. Erica is more rebellious, while Heather is more conservative.
- Sara Ballingall as Melanie Brodie, Kathleen's boy-crazy and naive best friend
- Rebecca Haines-Saah as Kathleen Mead, a "snooty mean girl" who is academically competitive with Caitlin. In later episodes, it is revealed that her mother is an alcoholic.
- Craig Driscoll as Rick Munro (seasons 1–2), a bad boy who is physically abused by his father
- Stacie Mistysyn as Caitlin Ryan, an activist who is passionate about issues such as the environment. However, she sometimes does more harm than good. She has on-off relationship with Joey in later episodes, which continues into the later series. She is also epileptic.
- Amanda Cook as Lorraine "L.D." Delacorte, a tomboy
- Amanda Stepto as Christine "Spike" Nelson, a punk girl who finds out she is pregnant, and decides to keep the baby. She gives birth to daughter Emma in between the second and third seasons. Stepto described Spike as "a young teenage mom whose mixed up and confused. She feels alone because every guy she's dealt with has hurt her in some way. People would probably think she's crabby, but she's just insecure."
- Irene Courakos as Alexa Pappadopoulos, an outgoing and sociable girl
- Michael Carry as Simon Dexter (seasons 2–3), a model and Alexa's boyfriend
- Dayo Ade as Bryant Lester Thomas "BLT" (seasons 2–3), Michelle's boyfriend
- Maureen McKay as Michelle Accette (seasons 2–3), Alexa's best friend
- Cathy Keenan as Liz O'Rourke (seasons 2–3), Spike's best friend

=== Teachers and other adults ===
- Dan Woods as Mr. Daniel Raditch, the Grade 8 homeroom teacher
- Michelle Goodeve as Ms. Karen Avery, the Grade 7 homeroom teacher
- Roger Montgomery as Mr. Garcia (season 3), Grade 9 teacher
- Deborah Lobban as Doris Bell, the school secretary

== Development ==
=== Concept ===
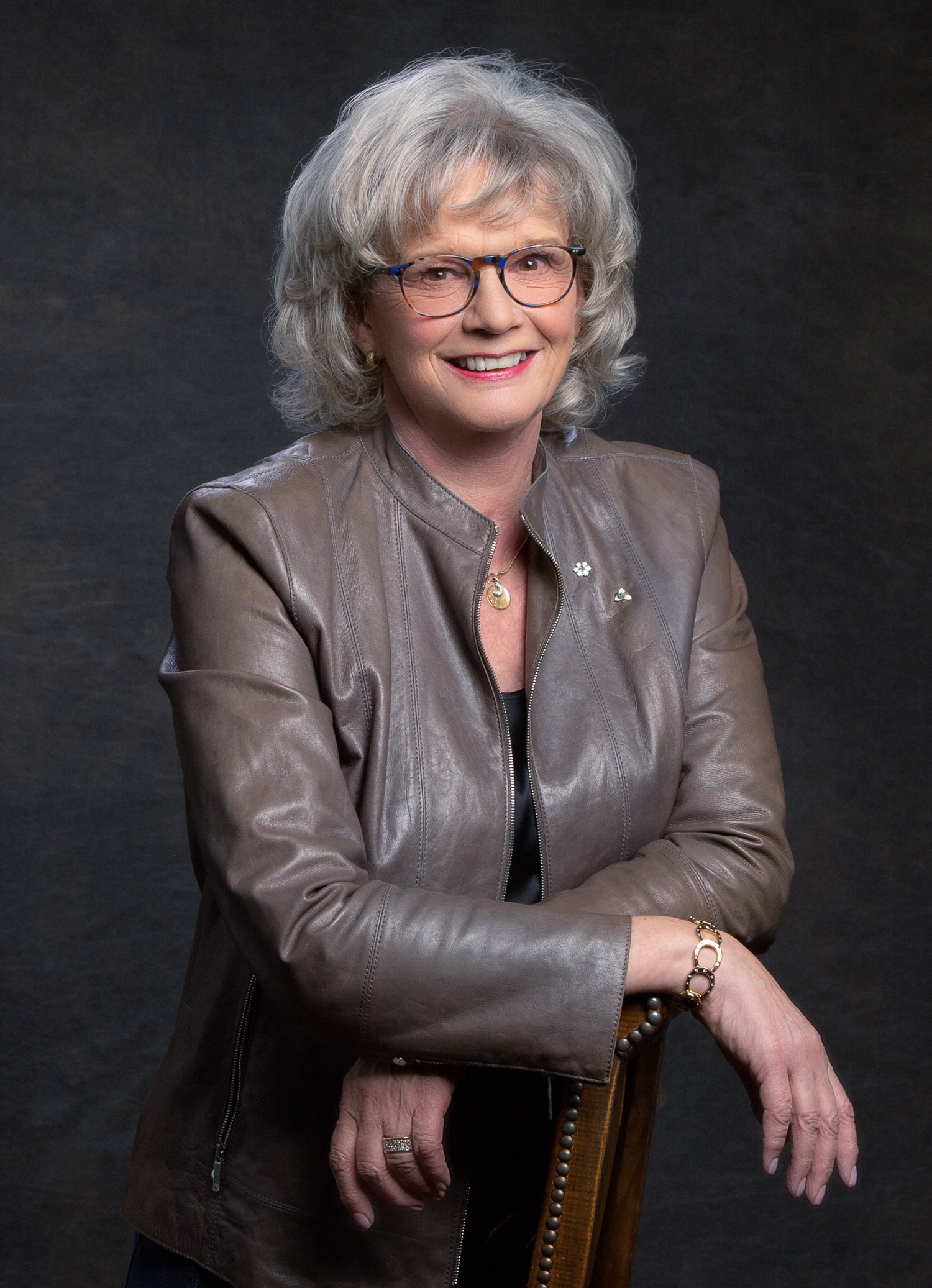
Linda Schuyler in 2022

In 1976, Ontario schoolteacher Linda Schuyler, an aspiring filmmaker, and her partner Kit Hood, an editor, founded the company Playing With Time to produce educational films and documentaries. In 1979, they produced the short film, Ida Makes a Movie, based on the 1974 children's book by Kay Chorao, which aired on the CBC. The success of Ida Makes A Movie led to an annual string of short films that further explored the same continuity. These short films were the basis for the children's series The Kids of Degrassi Street. The series was a critical success on the CBC and won numerous accolades; the episode "Griff Makes A Date" won International Emmy Award in 1985. The production team also featured editor Yan Moore, who became the head writer of the next series, as well as the co-creator of Degrassi: The Next Generation.

In January 1984, Linda Schuyler told the Toronto Star that they were "planning another series, Degrassi Junior High, and we're starting with the idea of doing 26 episodes. There's no such school, but who cares? We're negotiating seriously with CBC." In November 1985, she again told the Toronto Star that they would "launch a new series in about one year – Degrassi Junior High. The very last segment [of the series] shows the kids graduating. Where are they going? Degrassi Junior High!". The show was not a direct sequel, but instead a spinoff of the previous series. To help with the development, Schuyler hired a young writer named Avrum Jacobson. Schuyler explained to Jacobson that she was looking for a school version of Hill Street Blues, of which she "loved the intertwined storylines, some of which were resolved at the end of an episode and others which carried on to the next. I loved the moral dilemmas characters faced, often pitting 'what’s right' against 'what works'". Development of Degrassi Junior High commenced in early 1986.

=== Casting ===
Degrassi Junior High is noted for casting actors similar in age to their characters, as opposed to the practice of casting young adults in teenage roles commonly observed in media. Brodie Lancaster of the Sydney Morning Herald stated that this was a "rare occurrence in the genre" of teen drama. Schuyler has spoken of the inauthenticity of this practice on multiple occasions; during Degrassi Junior High's development in 1986, she told the Toronto Star about how "so much of the American stuff set in high schools is played by late teens and early 20s – and then some". In 2016, she further elaborated to IndieWire: "I like to talk about the fact that you can take a 25-year-old who looks 15 and have them play a role, but that actor is bringing 10 more years of life experience to that role. By having our cast be age-appropriate, they bring the freshness and the authenticity of that age."

During the development stage, Schuyler and Hood held a "pow-wow" with the cast of The Kids of Degrassi Street at the Playing With Time offices and offered them a choice between retaining their original characters, or auditioning for new characters. According to Kit Hood, the kids "wanted to leave behind the baggage, personalities and families of where they'd been" and decided to play new characters instead. Many of the actors who were regulars on Degrassi Street at this time, including Anais Granofsky, Neil Hope, and Stacie Mistysyn, returned in new roles.

Auditions took place throughout schools in Toronto; an estimated 300 kids auditioned and fifty-four were selected. Pat Mastroianni, who played Joey Jeremiah, was the first to audition. These actors constituted the Playing With Time Repertory Company (referred to by Kathryn Ellis as "the Repco"). The actors underwent a three-week acting workshop from 26 May to 13 June 1986, which taught them basic acting techniques. These workshops were repeated annually before the filming of each season, as new actors joined, and established actors took advanced workshops. Characters would be developed based on the strengths of the actors, and those who did exceptionally well would have their roles expanded upon. The idea of the repertory company meant that there was no bias towards a particular set of actors on screen; major characters could be background extras in one episode, as minor characters could get a major role or focus, a practice rare in television. The actors would also earn school credits for being in the repertory company. The actors were required to avoid missing more than eight days of their real school, but those with prominent roles usually missed three to four days a week. A tutor was used on set to help the actors with their studies. On set, the teenage actors would also usually run errands, including washing dishes and moving sandbags.

=== Production and filming ===
Following the first read-through of the script, which would take place in a circle, Schuyler and Hood sought extensive input from the actors. Many of the show's ideas were drawn from the actor's personal experiences, the writers' own teenage experiences, and "official idea sessions" with the actors. Yan Moore recalled in 2005: "In the old days, the kids would come to the office...and they'd tell us things." For instance, actor Siluck Saysanasy, who played Yick Yu, was forbidden to get an earring by his father, but was only allowed if he got one for the show; writer Yan Moore would write an earring into the script for Saysanasy. Amanda Stepto often experienced unwanted attention for her spiked hair, which was incorporated into an episode of the series. A typical episode would take two weeks to rehearse and two weeks to film. Each episode cost approximately $250,000 to $350,000 to produce; the first season cost $2.6 million.

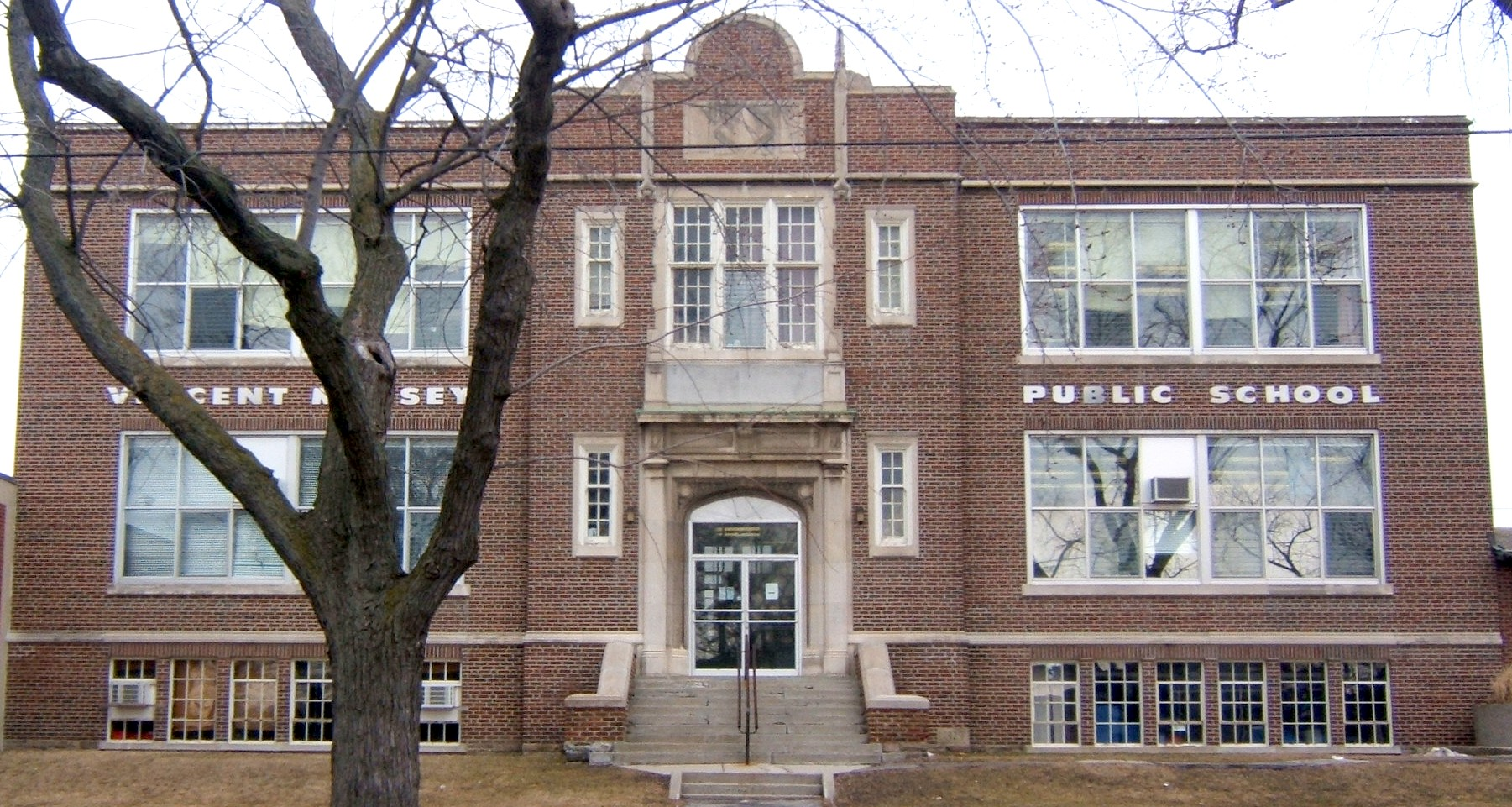
Vincent Massey Public School, the site of the fictional Degrassi Junior High School, pictured in 2009.

Filming for the show began on 8 July 1986 in Etobicoke, Ontario. and finished in December 1988. The actors would routinely gather at the Playing With Time production office and be taken via a minivan to the set, where shooting would take place from 9:00 a.m to 6:30 p.m. The school used for the show was the Vincent Massey Public School (then known as Daisy Avenue Public School) in Etobicoke, Ontario. At the time, the ground floor was being used as a Seventh-day Adventist school. As a result, the majority of the series was shot on the second floor, with the ground floor only used occasionally. One of the rooms, which was used as a library, served as a green room. The principal's office, in which kids are seen entering and leaving, was actually a door that opened to a blank wall. The lockers in the school were arranged to create an "illusion" of corridors. Principal photography of the series usually took place from April to December.

The series was filmed entirely on-location throughout the Greater Toronto Area. Places seen on the series include Queen-Broadview Village, which contained the real De Grassi Street as well as a building similar to that of Vincent Massey's, Dundas Street Junior School, which coincidentally served as the location for the school in The Kids of Degrassi Street, that served as a background double; this was done to make it seem like that neighbourhood was near the school, when in reality it was not. Various real life stores and other locations are shown and mentioned in the series, such as the Shoppers Drug Mart location on the corner of Queen & Carlaw streets, where various characters are seen shopping. Other locations, such as the Degrassi Grocery and the Broadview Community Health Clinic featured in the episode "It's Late" no longer exist. Earl Grey Senior Public School in Toronto, where Linda Schuyler was a teacher, served as the setting for Borden High School, where the grade nine students of season 3 attend part-time. The writers deliberately avoided real-world pop culture references in an effort to avoid dating the show, and instead created fictional media as a substitute. This includes bands such as "Gourmet Scum", movies such as "Teen Academy IV" and "Swamp Sex Robots", game shows such as "Quest for the Best", and soap operas such as "Days Of Passion". Sex educator Sue Johanson played "Dr. Sally", who hosts a radio talk show similar to Johanson's Sunday Night Sex Show.

=== Makeup and wardrobe ===
In an unconventional practice for television, Degrassi Junior High did not have a makeup and wardrobe department. The cast would usually wear their own clothes and apply their own makeup, although the art department would tweak their appearances for continuity purposes. Neil Hope, who played Derek "Wheels" Wheeler, stated: "It's looking phony. [...] When you look more natural, its helping the show." Some of the clothing choices however were not of the actors; actress Nicole Stoffman did not dress like her sexually provocative character Stephanie Kaye. However, the "outrageously-coiffed" hair of character Christine "Spike" Nelson, was the real hair of actress Amanda Stepto, who was an avid fan of punk rock music.

=== Opening sequence ===
The "documentary-style" opening sequence follows the show's 30–60-second cold open. The sequence begins with a stop-motion live-action scene of a person picking up a group of textbooks, labeled "History", "Geography", "Math" and "English", and walking away. It mostly consists of scenes from various episodes of the characters in and around the school, juxtaposed with images of students with blackboard-esque transitions. The opening sequence does not credit the cast members. Kelley criticised this: "The opening needs to be a little cheat sheet to all of them. Give us a little clue to their personality. Here we’ve just got some random smiling and a set of twins that are ALWAYS in the same shot together."

=== Theme song and music ===
A twelve-second sample of the opening theme song to Degrassi Junior High, noted for its highly optimistic and inspirational tone and described as having a "chirpy, almost inane melody" by Cinema Canada magazine.

Wendy Watson and Lewis Manne, composers of the music to The Kids of Degrassi Street, composed, arranged and performed all of the original music for Degrassi Junior High, including its theme song, which was sung by Watson. The theme is composed in C major and is driven by synthesizers and guitars. It begins with a pessimistic tone, with the narrator feeling uncertain about going to school. The lyrics turn optimistic as the narrator notices "that someone is smiling right at me". It concludes with the lyrics "Everybody can succeed, all you need is to believe/Be honest with yourself, forget your fears and doubts/Come on give us a try at Degrassi Junior High!".

Anne Weiss of Cinema Canada magazine described the theme song as having a "chirpy, almost inane melody". Shamus Kelley of Den of Geek called it "inspirational", opining: "It’s where the song shifts from talking about what’s going to happen at Degrassi and focuses on you. Come on, you can do it. This show will give you all the tools you need. Come on; sit down with us for half an hour so we can show you why getting pregnant in middle school is a SUPER drag. For a show that’s all about slice of life and dealing with big problems, it’s perfect." An instrumental variation of the opening theme is used in the end credits, and it was later reworked for Degrassi High. Watson and Manne recorded the show's incidental and diegetic music using a drums, bass, guitar and keyboard arrangement. Songs by various Canadian recording artists, including Watson and Manne's own music, were used in the background of school dances and on radios.

A frequent plot point in the series concerns the Zit Remedy, a fictional garage rock band comprising Joey Jeremiah on keyboards, Archie "Snake" Simpson on guitar, and Derek "Wheels" Wheeler on bass. Their respective actors, Pat Mastroianni, Stefan Brogren and Neil Hope, were musically inexperienced and were guided by Lewis Manne on how to play their instruments. They only have one song, titled "Everybody Wants Something". According to Kathryn Ellis, the song was written by a nephew of Watson and Manne on the back of a school permission letter, and sent to them. However, Mastroianni has claimed that he, Brogren, and Hope wrote the song. In the novel Exit Stage Left, the Zit Remedy have a second song, titled "I Don't Want To Be A Porcupine With Anyone Else But You, Baby". Stories around the group continue in Degrassi High, where their name is shortened to The Zits.

== Episodes ==
Season	Episodes	Originally released	
Season	Episodes	First released	Last released
1	13	January 18, 1987	May 3, 1987
2	13	January 4, 1988	March 28, 1988
3	16	November 7, 1988	February 27, 1989

=== Degrassi Between Takes ===
Degrassi Between Takes is a half-hour documentary special that aired on October 30, 1989, a week before the premiere of the sequel series Degrassi High, on CBC. The documentary is a behind-the-scenes look at Degrassi Junior High, shot during the show's third season and narrated by Peter Gzowski. The special focuses on the development and impact of the series, with footage of the cast at the Gemini Awards, working on set, socializing in public and on publicity tours.

== Release ==
=== Original broadcast run ===
The series premiered on CBC on January 18, 1987 and concluded after three seasons and 42 episodes on February 27, 1989. It originally ran on Sundays at 5:00 p.m. Starting from its second season, due to a budget squeeze, it was then moved to Monday nights at 7:30 p.m, and then later by then-new CBC programming chief Ivan Fecan, a supporter of the show, to primetime at 8:30 p.m, between the popular American series Kate & Allie and Newhart. Fecan viewed Degrassi Junior High as a standard for Canadian television writers; in 1988, he stated that there was "nothing bogus about that show", and that he wished that he had "20 more shows like it". When Fecan called Schuyler to inform her of the move, she reportedly disagreed, feeling that the series wasn't ready for prime time. She eventually agreed to the decision, under the condition that if the move was unsuccessful, the series wouldn't be cancelled and instead be moved back to its original timeslot. Following its move to prime time, the viewership increased 40 percent.

In the United States, the Public Broadcasting Service (PBS) debuted the series on September 26, 1987. On PBS, the show aired on Saturdays at 7:00 p.m. In New York City, the series aired on Tuesdays at 6:00 p.m. on WNET starting from September 22, 1987. On PBS, the first two seasons were combined into one 26-episode season. The third season, which was aired as the second season in the United States, premiered on 10 December 1988 and ended on 15 April 1989. The program was distributed through PBS member station WGBH-TV in Boston, who was a primary financial backer of the show. Due to PBS's lack of commercials, the American version featured more scenes than the original Canadian version.

By November 1988, Degrassi Junior High was being shown in over forty countries, including Australia, Greece, China, France, and the United Kingdom, where it was screened on the BBC starting from April 5, 1988. In the UK, several episodes were not broadcast in their regular timeslot, including "It's Late" and "Rumour Has It", which involved rumours that a teacher was gay. Although these episodes were later included on the youth program DEF II on BBC2, the second and third seasons were never broadcast. The series concluded its BBC run on May 10, 1988, with re-runs of the aired episodes from the first season continuing into 1989. In Australia, the show debuted on ABC TV on February 8, 1988, as part of The Afternoon Show hosted by James Valentine, where it aired at 5:00 p.m. The series finale aired in Australia on October 10, 1989.

In France, Junior High and High were aired under the banner Les Années collège (The College Years) on Antenne 2 starting from September 10, 1988.

=== Re-runs and syndication ===
In Canada, the series re-ran on CBC starting from summer 1991. On September 1, 1997, the show began to air in re-runs on Showcase. In the United States, the series was rerun on Showtime starting from August 14, 1994, in its original 1987 CBC timeslot. Starting from October 8, 2005, it debuted on the Noggin block The N with a two-hour block, followed by standard re-runs. In Australia, re-runs aired starting on ABC from 1992. It later re-ran on ABC1's Rollercoaster and ABC2. By 2001, it had been syndicated in over seventy countries. In the United Kingdom, UK Gold screened Degrassi Junior High daily starting from its launch in 1992. Later in the mid-1990s, Degrassi Junior High later reran on The Children's Channel.

=== Novel adaptations ===
Starting from 1988, a series of mass-market paperback novelizations were released by James Lorimer & Co. The books would often centre on a particular character on the show and expanded upon storylines from the series, although the novel Exit Stage Left, which centres around various students as they organize a school play, is original. A thirteenth book, based on the characters Arthur Kobalewscuy and Yick Yu and written by Kathryn Ellis, remains unreleased.

The books were also published in other places; in Australia, they were published by ABC in November 1990, with more published in January 1991. The books also saw French Canadian releases by Les Éditions de Minuit.

=== Home media and streaming ===
Cover of Region 4 release of Degrassi Junior High and Degrassi High

The series has seen multiple home video releases as well as releases to streaming. In the United States, the series is distributed on home video by WGBH Boston Home Video, who released a twenty-one volume VHS boxset in 2000. WGBH would later release it on DVD in Region 1 in 2005. Each season was released separately followed by a complete 9-disc boxset. The 2005 WGBH box set, as well as the individual sets, include various special features, including the Degrassi Talks series, the 1989 Degrassi Between Takes documentary, printable materials, wallpapers, and a pop quiz.

In Region 4, the show's home media releases are distributed by Beyond Home Entertainment (under the imprint Force), who released a seven-disc set in 2006, including an extra disc containing special features. The special features are similar to the Region 1 box set, omitting the pop quiz. The series was also made available on YouTube.

In July 2023, Degrassi Junior High was made available on Amazon Prime Video in Canada, Australia, and New Zealand.

Season	Set details	DVD release dates			Special features
Season	Set details	Region 1	Region 2	Region 4	Special features
Degrassi Junior High: Season One	Discs: 3; Episodes: 13; 1.33:1 aspect ratio	1 February 2005	30 April 2007	1 October 2005	Region 1: Degrassi Talks: On Drugs; Degrassi Talks: On Sexuality; Degrassi Talks: On Sex; Trivia; Wallpapers; Printable materials
Degrassi Junior High: Season Two	Discs: 3; Episodes: 13; 1.33:1 aspect ratio	7 June 2005		1 October 2005	Region 1: Degrassi Talks: On Alcohol; Degrassi Talks: On Abuse; Degrassi Talks: On Depression; Trivia; Wallpapers; Printable materials
Degrassi Junior High: Season Three	Discs: 3; Episodes: 16; 1.33:1 aspect ratio	27 September 2005		1 October 2005	Region 1: Degrassi Between Takes; Trivia; Wallpapers; Printable materials
The Complete Collection/Series	Discs: 9 (2005), 6 (2016); Episodes: 42; 1.33:1 aspect ratio	25 October 2005 11 October 2016			Special features from individual sets
The Complete Degrassi High (Degrassi High & Degrassi Junior High)	Discs: 13; Episodes: 71; 1.33:1 aspect ratio			2 November 2016	Degrassi Talks; Degrassi Between Takes; Degrassi: School's Out

== Reception and impact ==
=== Contemporary critical reception ===
I’ve watched four episodes, and though they vary in quality and texture from knock-you-over-the-head-bluntness to subtle sensitivity, they’re always earnest and well-intentioned.

Best perhaps, they avoid being glib, reflexive and simplistic. They show life is not black and white, but shades of gray, that it’s full of choices and that growing up means making those choices and finding that there are no easy answers to eternal questions.

— Steve Sonsky, Miami Herald, 3 Oct 1987.

Degrassi Junior High was immediately acclaimed by most critics upon release. Favourable reviews regularly came from the Toronto Star, the Globe and Mail, the Ottawa Citizen, and the Montreal Gazette. After its move to prime time, critics felt it had been well deserved. Initially, one dissenting critic was Jim Bawden of the Toronto Star. A fan of The Kids of Degrassi Street, Bawden was largely negative in his review of the premiere episode, stating that it didn't "seem as naturalistic" as The Kids of Degrassi Street, criticising the "cutesy sitcom lines" and calling the plotline of the episode "forced and unreal". In later reviews, Bawden changed his assessment, and his later support for it was credited with influencing its move to prime-time.

Critics commonly viewed it as a superior alternative to other television programs, particularly American shows, that were more heavy-handed and moralistic in their portrayals of adolescent issues. Robert James of the Times Colonist stated: "Unlike the wholesome role models that populate most TV series in the increasingly conservative '80s, these teenagers often learn from their own mistakes." Writing for the Edmonton Journal, Bob Remington felt Degrassi Junior High was an exception to "unrealistically antiseptic" television series such as The Cosby Show and Our House. Dave Rhein, in a review for wire service Gannett, declared it to be a "diamond in the rough, that puts to shame commercial network efforts to create a show aimed at teenagers".

Praise was also given to the show's technical aspects; Anne Weiss of Cinema Canada magazine noted that "the style is untheatrical, non-demonstrative, giving the illusion that the young actors are simply acting out their lives". Other critics, including Weiss, and Janice Kennedy of the Montreal Gazette, praised the show's cinematography. Kennedy praised the decision to shoot on film rather than video tape, stating that it gave it "a smoother, more finished look". Weiss praised the show's "active use of the camera", which she felt "breathes life into otherwise ordinary situations". Kennedy praised the dialogue and called it another strong suit of the show.

Although more of a low-key affair in the United States, reception from American critics was similarly positive. Speaking of the show's upcoming premiere on PBS, Fred M. Hechinger of the New York Times pondered whether the show's then-uncommon way of addressing adolescent issues would have an impact; "Can teen-agers be won over to entertainment that is not mindless, violent or sexually irresponsible?". In 1989, the series was profiled by John Fisher Burns, also of the New York Times, who asserted it was "remolding the pat-a-cake image of what the industry, with at least some sense of paradox, likes to call ''children's television.'" Writing for New Jersey's The Record, Joel Pitsezner remarked that he was so impressed with the series that he skipped two press conferences to watch more episodes, citing in particular the "intelligent and sensitive writing" of Yan Moore, the "believable interplay" between the actors, and in particular the portrayal of the "pain and awkwardness of the early teen years", the latter of which he believed to be its best quality. Steve Sonsky of the Miami Herald praised the portrayal of its characters, and felt that it differentiated the series from others with teenage characters that were less realistically problematic.

=== Television ratings ===
By 1988, Degrassi Junior High was the highest-rated drama show in Canada. It frequently exceeded a million viewers per week; in her memoir, Schuyler stated that at the time, "a show in Canada (population of 27 million) was considered very successful if it broke through the one million mark". By season 2, Degrassi Junior High was receiving an average of 1.4 million viewers with a peak of 1.9 million. At the end of season 2 in April 1988, Toronto Star's Jim Bawden reported that its viewership "hovered around 1.2 million a week, one of the brightest spots on Canadian TV". The season 3 premiere drew 1.7 million viewers, which accounted for 21 percent of the entire audience during that slot.

In the United Kingdom, where several episodes drew controversy and weren't aired in its regular slot, the series amassed six million viewers, making it the highest-rated children's program at the time.

=== Promotion and fan reaction ===
In Canada, the series became a cultural phenomenon, and turned its cast members into national celebrities, who drew a fanaticism likened to Beatlemania. They made numerous publicity trips around North America and in Europe to promote the show. They were accompanied by publicist Kathryn Ellis. When travelling by plane, one of the actors would be in charge of checking the others through the airport. They were warmly received in other places and participated in cultural activities. According to Ellis, the cast members frequently visited Halifax. Cast members also participated in local public service events; for instance, Bill Parrott, who played Shane McKay, co-hosted the launch of the Kids Help Phone hotline in Toronto. They also participated in meet-and-greets and book signings.

Some actors from the series were frequently conflated with their characters. Amanda Stepto, who played teenage mother Spike, was often sent baby products by fans who genuinely believed that she was pregnant. Kit Hood stated in Degrassi Between Takes of his concern that "the audience sometimes expects the kids to have knowledge about their characters that they don't have in real life". Despite their international fame, many of the actors' teachers and parents were not perturbed by this. Pat Mastroianni recalled that his geography teacher gave him a low grade despite succeeding in other subjects; Rebecca Haines recalled her parents threatening to remove her from the show if her grades were low enough. Speaking to the Edmonton Journal, Haines stated: "Some teachers can be jerks about it. [...] When you get home at eight at night, after working all day, you don't feel like writing an essay".

In 1989, UNICEF Canada entered a partnership with Degrassi Junior High, and the entire cast were made UNICEF Goodwill Ambassadors. The cast members would make various appearances and appear in several public service announcements. Pat Mastroianni and Amanda Stepto flew to New York City to tour the Headquarters of the United Nations and meet other ambassadors. That same year, coinciding with the declaration of the Convention on the Rights of the Child, a ten-minute video called The Degrassi Kids Rap On Rights was distributed to schools nationwide. The video, narrated by Amanda Stepto, focused on the impending ratification of the Convention and highlighted the childhood experiences of several cast members in refugee camps and natural disasters.

=== Use in schools ===
The series was often shown in schools as part of health and sex education curricula. Educational materials relating to the series were released by WGBH in the United States during its original run, including discussion & activity guides. 25,000 copies of the Degrassi Junior High Discussion and Activity Guide were distributed to educators. In 1989, ten schools in Omaha, Nebraska were reported as using the first season of the series in their seventh and eighth grade human growth and development curriculum.

== Awards and nominations ==
Degrassi Junior High won thirty-seven awards, including eight Gemini Awards, three Parents' Choice Awards, three Chris Awards, and one International Emmy Award. The episode "It's Late" won the International Emmy Award for Children & Young People in 1987, and the series was nominated again for the award in 1988 for the second season episode "Great Expectations". The series won a Rockie Award for Best Continuing Series at the Banff Television Festival in 1988, where it drew praise from MTM Enterprises senior vice president and judge Laurence Bloustein, and marked the first time it had won an award outside of children's categories. However, at the next festival, an episode about AIDS was unanimously rejected for being "sloppily executed".

Out of the eight Gemini Awards won by the series, including one won in 1987 for Best Children's Series, it won four in 1988, including Best Continuing Dramatic Series, and Best Direction in a Dramatic Comedy Series for Kit Hood. When one award was announced, thirty four cast members took the stage. Furthermore, actors Pat Mastroianni and Stacie Mistysyn won the Best Leading Actor and Best Leading Actress in a Dramatic Role awards in 1988 and 1989 respectively. Mastroianni's win in particular was considered an upset, as he had beaten several established Canadian actors such as Scott Hylands and Donnelly Rhodes. Nineteen members of the cast, including Mastroianni, Mistysyn, Amanda Stepto, Stefan Brogren and Neil Hope were nominated for the Young Artist Award for Outstanding Young Ensemble Cast in 1990, but lost to A Mother's Courage: The Mary Thomas Story.

== Legacy and influence ==
=== Retrospective assessments ===
Degrassi Junior High is regarded as one of Canada's greatest television achievements. In 2017, the series was named by the Toronto International Film Festival as one of Canada's 150 most significant contributions to the cinematic landscape. The series is also credited with establishing the overall popularity and longevity of the Degrassi franchise. The series has continued to receive critical acclaim. Ian Warden of The Canberra Times, speaking of its continued re-runs on the ABC in Australia, asserted in 1995 that it was "perhaps the best sustained piece of children's television drama ever made". In 2000, Leah McLaren of The Globe and Mail recalled having disliked the series with her friends as a teenager, before later appreciating the "raw beauty" of the series as an adult. In addition, McLaren called it "way ahead of its time, both aesthetically and conceptually". Ottawa Citizen critic Tony Atherton, in a mixed review of the premiere episode of Degrassi: The Next Generation, made numerous comparisons between the characters of the older and newer series, and felt that due to the "deluge of teen dramas since". Next Generation would not make the same impact as the "groundbreaking" original series.

Reviewing the DVD release of its first season in 2007, Andrew Mickel of Den of Geek felt the show still held up twenty years after its debut, and stated that its "real strength" is that "it is massively unfair, and the moral lessons aren’t hammered into each episode with a patronising mallet". He further elaborated that even though Degrassi: The Next Generation "still tries to do the hard-hitting stuff", he felt Degrassi Junior High was "much more of a labour of love" because of the lengths the production crew went to produce it the first time around. Exclaim!'s Noel Dix, also reviewing the DVD release, remarked: "Even to this day most shows geared towards teenagers would rather deal with absurd and unrealistic scenarios for sensationalistic results than deal with problems their viewers may experience", and that "instead of it feeling like a stuffy educational show, Degrassi felt warm because its characters were real, awkward and somewhat unattractive, just like real high school!" In 2016, David Berry of the National Post noted the difference between the show and the "slicker" Next Generation, saying that it was "like someone snuck a piece of avant-garde socialist realism onto mainstream network airwaves". In 2023, Denis Grignon of the Toronto Star wrote that having rewatched the series, he "expected a pleasant, but outdated, TV time capsule, and was pleasantly surprised that it was easy to look past the mullets, hairspray and phones fixed to kitchen walls to observe themes I now witness as an occasional high school supply teacher."

=== Influence on the teen drama genre ===
One of the first drama series in Canada to exclusively target teenage audiences, Degrassi Junior High has been described as an early teen drama and an influence on later and better-known series such as Beverly Hills, 90210, of which Degrassi Junior High is frequently compared to. Michelle Byers, editor of Growing Up Degrassi, writes that while generally unacknowledged in most discussions about teen drama, Degrassi Junior High was a progenitor of the genre. According to the book The Greatest Cult Television Shows of All Time, the series was a trailblazer for future teen-oriented drama series "mainly because it understood teenage culture better than almost any other show produced before or since".

A popular urban legend, which reportedly originated on the 1999 Jonovision cast reunion special, states that American producer Aaron Spelling unsuccessfully tried to adapt the series for an American audience, which led to the development of Beverly Hills, 90210. Both Linda Schuyler and Kit Hood have denied this. The Guardian's Sarah Hughes suggested that Beverly Hills, 90210 was "Spelling's answer" to Degrassi Junior High. Writing about the death of actor Neil Hope, the New York Times's Paul Vitello said the show anticipated Beverly Hills 90210 as well as the MTV's The Real World. It has also been named as an influence on Dawson's Creek, 7th Heaven, and Felicity. There have academic studies on the comparisons between Degrassi Junior High and American teen drama series.

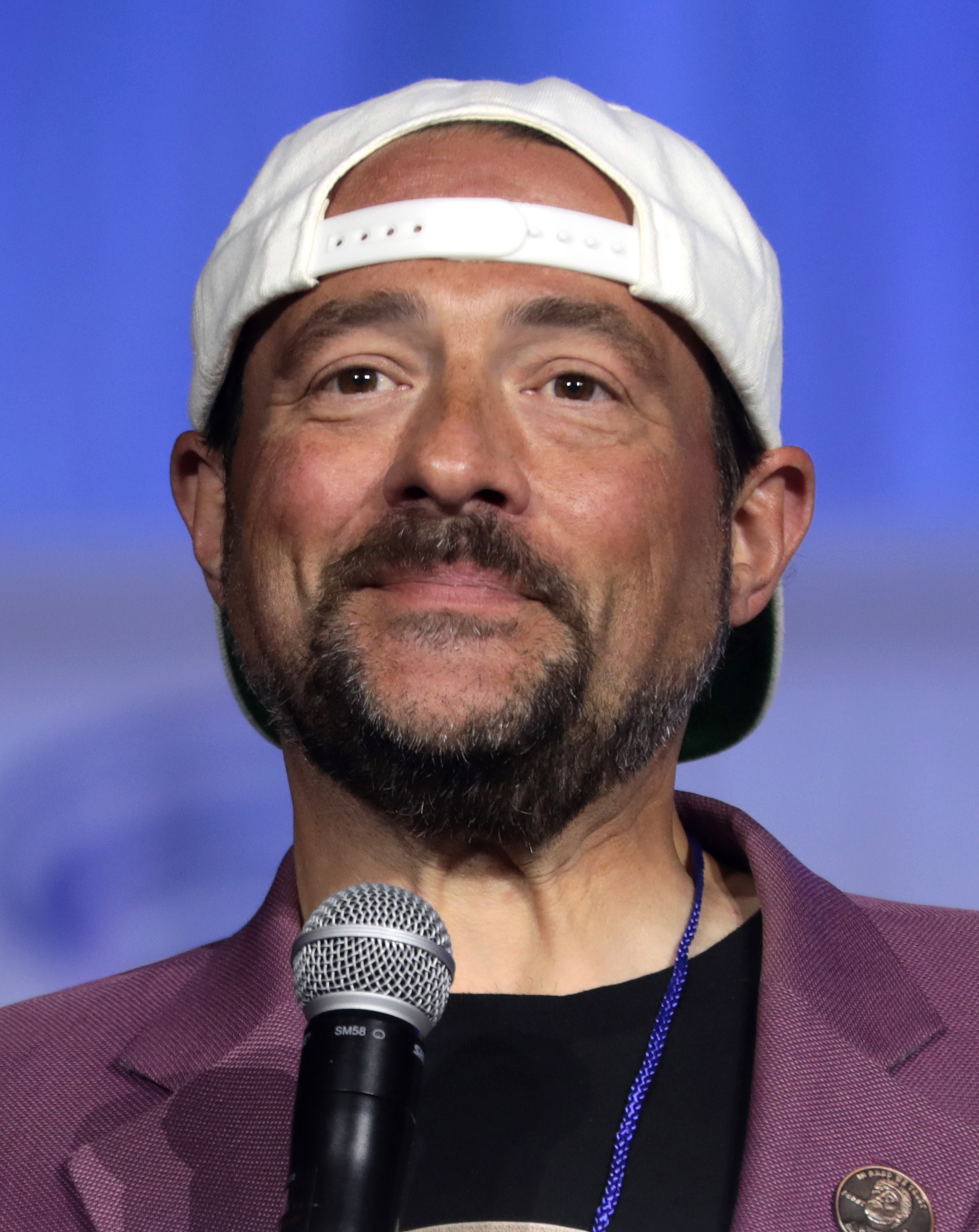
Kevin Smith was a notable fan of Degrassi Junior High and later starred on several episodes of Degrassi: The Next Generation.

=== In popular culture ===
American filmmaker Kevin Smith was a particular fan of Degrassi Junior High, having discovered it while working at a convenience store in New Jersey, and acknowledged an infatuation with Stacie Mistysyn and her character Caitlin Ryan. Smith wrote a piece about his enthusiasm for the series for Details magazine in November 1996, where it is claimed that he spent $3,000 on the series on home video. Smith has referenced the series several times in his work, including Clerks, which features a character named Caitlin Bree, and Chasing Amy.

He wanted Mistysyn to appear in Mallrats, but Universal Pictures wanted a better-known actress and vetoed him. As a compromise, Shannen Doherty, who was cast in the role Smith wanted for Mistysyn, is seen wearing a Degrassi jacket in the film. Smith, along with Jason Mewes, guest-starred on and wrote several episodes of Degrassi: The Next Generation, in which they play fictional versions of themselves filming a Jay and Silent Bob movie at the school. Smith later wrote the introduction to The Official 411: Degrassi Generations by Kathryn Ellis.

=== Cult following ===
Degrassi Junior High and Degrassi High developed a significant cult following after their initial broadcast. The 1990s saw the proliferation of an online fandom, which took form on a network of fanmade websites. One of these sites, Degrassi Online, maintained by University of Waterloo student Mark Aaron Polger, was particularly comprehensive, hosting multimedia and a collection of user-submitted fanfiction. Epitome Pictures, who were now handling the Degrassi series, sent Polger a draft statement of claim in December 2000, claiming he was confusing the public with his website. After he sent a press release to several media outlets and garnered the support of other fans, Epitome withdrew the claim. Polger criticised Epitome Pictures for showing a lack of gratitude for the online community's impact on the show's continued success. In 1996, Sharon Mulholland created the website Degrassi Update, which listed public sightings of cast members from the show.

On 24 August 1999, several fans hosted a small reunion event at the Centennial College where Degrassi High was filmed, and the cast reunited on the CBC youth show Jonovision, hosted by Jonathan Torrens, on 24–25 December 1999. With people from as far as San Francisco attending the taping, it became Jonovision's highest-rated episode and is now regarded as a catalyst for the development of the revival Degrassi: The Next Generation. Pat Mastroianni, who had spent most of the 2010s appearing at fan conventions across Canada, later organized Degrassi Palooza, a convention celebrating the legacy of the 1980s Degrassi series and featuring a reunion of 26 cast and crew members, at the Westin Toronto Airport Hotel in mid-June 2019.

== See also ==
- The Kids of Degrassi Street — predecessor to Degrassi Junior High featuring some of its actors in different roles
- Degrassi High — sequel series of Degrassi Junior High, following the same characters in high school
- Degrassi: The Next Generation — 2001 reboot of the series, featuring several characters from Degrassi Junior High as adults.

== Works cited ==
- Byers, Michelle (30 December 2007). "Degrassi". In Mitchell, Claudia; Reid-Walsh, Jacqueline (eds.). Girl Culture: An Encyclopedia. ABC-CLIO. pp. 261–262. ISBN 9780313084447.
- Ellis, Kathryn (2005). The official 411 Degrassi generations. Fenn Pub. Co. ISBN 1-55168-278-8. OCLC 59136593.
- Hamburg, David A.; Hamburg, Beatrix A. (2004). Learning to live together : preventing hatred and violence in child and adolescent development. Oxford: Oxford University Press. ISBN 978-0-19-534801-9. OCLC 58992746.
- Kenter, Peter (2001). TV North : everything you wanted to know about Canadian television. Vancouver: Whitecap. p. 39. ISBN 1-55285-146-X. OCLC 45190705.
- Olson, Christopher J.; Reinhard, CarrieLynn D. (2020). The Greatest Cult Television Shows of All Time. Rowman & Littlefield. pp. 55–56. ISBN 9781538122563.
- Schuyler, Linda (15 November 2022). The Mother Of All Degrassi: A Memoir. ECW Press. ISBN 978-1-77041-683-3. OCLC 1309065167.
- Stohn, Stephen (2018). Whatever it takes : life lessons from Degrassi and elsewhere in the world of music and television. Christopher Ward. Toronto: Dundurn. ISBN 978-1-4597-4000-6. OCLC 1022792148.
