= John Ioannou =

Canadian actor

John Ioannou is an actor best known for his role as "Pete Riley" and "Alex Yankou" on the Degrassi series.

== Filmography ==
- The Gospel of John (2003)
- The Fourth Angel (2001)
- Degrassi Junior High (1987)
- The Kids of Degrassi Street (1982)
- The Aphrodite Inheritance (1979)
- The Greek Tycoon (1978)
