= Ida Makes a Movie =

- Directed by: Kit Hood; Linda Schuyler
- Written by: Amy Jo Cooper
- Produced by: Kit Hood; Linda Schuyler
- Starring: Zoe Newman; Elwy Yost
- Cinematography: Phillip Earnshaw
- Production companies: National Film Board of Canada (NFB); Playing With Time Inc.
- Release date: September 12, 1979
- Running time: 21 minutes
- Country: Canada
- Language: English

Ida Makes a Movie is a 1979 Canadian after school special short film produced by Kit Hood and Linda Schuyler for the Canadian Broadcasting Corporation, who aired the film on September 12, 1979. The story was adapted from the 1974 children's picture book Ida Makes a Movie, which was written by Kay Chorao. Schuyler, a former media teacher at Earl Grey Senior Public School, was introduced to the book via the school's librarian, and purchased the film rights from Chorao for $200.

The film led to a series of further short films that aired on the CBC, which later developed into The Kids of Degrassi Street, the first series in the Degrassi teen drama franchise.

== Plot ==
9-year-old Ida Lucas and her 6-year-old friend, Cookie, are having a day in the park on Degrassi Street. Ida is upset by the amount of litter around the park, despite the signs posted. After Ida has the disgusting experience of stepping on someone's discarded sandwich, Cookie (who cannot read) points out another sign, an advertisement for a children's film making contest by the National Film Board of Canada. When Ida reads it to her, Cookie asks if she's going to enter. Ida initially says no, but reconsiders.

Later that day, Ida goes rooting around in her house's attic for an old movie camera of her father's. She is disheartened to find it broken, but her mother encourages her to go to the camera store and get an estimate on what it would take to repair it. There, Ida gets another shock when she find out that not only will she have to leave it there, but that it will cost about $20 overall, both to repair the camera (which has a broken spring), and to buy a roll of film. Although she leaves it there, Ida does not know where to get that much money.

Ida and Cookie are talking it over later, when Ida's brother Fred, a baseball player, comes home from a game. Fred is angry over having lost the last game of the season, and is scornful of Ida's plans, to say nothing of being unwilling to give her any money. He coldly suggests that Ida earn the money, which she is not sure how to do. But then her mother calls to Ida about the junk she left all over the attic, when she was searching for the camera. She says that she will throw it all away unless Ida cleans it up, which gives Ida another brainstorm: a garage sale.

The sale goes well, to the point where Ida is even able to talk Fred into paying 75 cents for an old soldier's helmet that he finds (even though it's already theirs). Irritated, he calls into question whether Ida even knows how to use a camera, prompting Ida to admit that she has to learn. So when Ida successfully pays for the camera with her funds from the sale, she makes sure to ask the salesman how to use it.

Filming starts, with Ida, Cookie, and even Fred all decked out: Ida has borrowed a fancy-looking beret from her mother ("All directors wear them! I saw it in a book!"), Cookie in a long dress (she is practicing a dance she will do), and Fred refusing to take off his soldier's hat. Ida and Cookie persuade Fred to join the filming, a story about the importance of picking up garbage and keeping things clean. Since it is garbage pick-up day in Ida's neighborhood, Fred will make a show of picking up trash bags and taking them to the curb, while Cookie will dance about and plant little flowers, to "make the yard look nice." A simple enough plan, but it rapidly goes wrong: just as the garbage men arrive on the street, Fred picks up one of Cookie's dolls by accident, and they get into a tug-of-war over it, on camera. Amidst the fracas, Cookie falls down whilst the doll gets thrown into the garbage truck and is crushed in the compactor and the camera catches that, too. Nonetheless, Ida is sure that the film turned out great, consoling Cookie over the loss of the doll as Fred goes back inside, insisting that no one will want to watch the film.

Two weeks later, Ida gets a letter from the film board (addressed to "Ida T. Lucas"), telling her that her powerful film about "the effect of war on children" has been selected as a finalist, and that she and her family should come to the awards ceremony on the 2nd of September. Ida is thrilled, despite the misunderstanding, while Cookie is bothered by the idea of accepting an award for the film under what seem to be false pretenses, while Ida insists that it's not lying... especially if no one tells.

Ida is talking about the award with her mother, an artist who is making a drawing. Ida tries to conceal the misunderstanding by saying she has lost the letter, but is forced to reveal that she still has it: already, her cover story is falling apart. Her mother reads the letter and expresses surprise (and perhaps, a note of skepticism) that Ida would take on a profound topic like war in her amateur film.

Finally, awards night arrives, but Ida tries to chicken out, claiming that she's sick. (Comically, she claims to have an ulcer, and that she's afraid it's contagious.) Clearly guilt-stricken over her lie of omission, Ida asks her mother a veiled question: if someone misunderstood one of her mother's pictures, but still liked it, is it right to correct them? Her mother insists that it's the right thing to do, especially since she'd be the only person who could reveal the truth. She also reassures Ida that she'll always be proud of her, even if she doesn't win. Suddenly, Ida's "ulcer" miraculously clears up, and she's eager to go to the awards.

At the ceremony, the award is presented by the kindly Mr. Druffle, who announces that Ida's work, on "how devastating war is to children," is the winner. The film is then shown, with Ida and the kids then realizing how, with Fred and Cookie fighting, and him wearing the helmet, and concluding with Cookie's doll being compacted in the garbage truck, the film could be misinterpreted as a powerful anti-war statement. So when Ida reluctantly takes the podium, she tries to decline the award in a fit of conscience, explaining to Mr. Druffle how the mistake came about. Clearly taken aback, by the confession, Mr. Druffle then decides that since she did win the award on merit, and since honesty should be rewarded, that the Board will allow Ida to keep the award anyway. He then encourages a round of applause for Ida's film, on "how to wage war... on garbage."

== Cast ==
- Zoe Newman - Ida Lucas
- Dawn Harrison - Catherine "Cookie" Peters
- Allan Meiusi - Fred Lucas

== Production ==
Linda Schuyler, a media teacher at Earl Grey Senior Public School, and Kit Hood, a commercial editor, founded Playing With Time in 1976. In 1979, Schuyler received a copy of the children's book Ida Makes a Movie, written by Kay Chorao, when she requested Earl Grey librarian Bruce Mackey to acquire several books about filmmaking. Mackey was unaware that it was children's fiction about cats, and saw little use of it. Around the same time, Schuyler, who was struggling to find films to show her class, screened a National Film Board of Canada film about a young girl's struggles with an alcoholic father. During a subsequent discussion, Schuyler noticed one of the students moving between first and third person, indicating to Schuyler that the student likely lived in an alcoholic household. After getting counselling for the student, Schuyler became inspired to adapt Ida into a film.

Before leaving, Schuyler sought legal advice from Stephen Stohn, a young entertainment lawyer who had recently graduated from law school, and who would eventually become her producing partner and husband. Stohn recalled in his 2018 memoir Whatever It Takes that he advised Schuyler that being out of print, buying the rights to the book on her own would be "relatively straightforward", and that involving lawyers would make the process "unnecessarily complicated". Stohn instead gave Schuyler a boilerplate form for permission to take with her to New York. Schuyler purchased the rights for $200. The feline characters were changed into human children on the advice of a distributor who said the market was flooded with animation, and the story was also largely repurposed. The film featured production techniques that Schuyler and Kit Hood felt were missing from children's programming: it was shot in a cinéma vérité style, with handheld camera work and entirely on-location shooting. Auditions for the film were advertised via a sandwich board outside the Playing With Time production office. Mackey offered his home, 98 De Grassi Street, as a filming location.

== Legacy ==
After three more annual specials, the films were turned into the series The Kids of Degrassi Street in 1982. It is retroactively considered the first entry in the franchise.

== Bibliography ==
- Chorao, Kay (1974). Ida Makes a Movie. New York City: Seabury Press. ISBN 0-8164-3121-3.

== Sources ==
- Ellis, Kathryn (2005). The official 411 Degrassi generations. Fenn Pub. Co. ISBN 1-55168-278-8. OCLC 59136593.
- Stohn, Stephen (2018). Whatever it takes: life lessons from Degrassi and elsewhere in the world of music and television. Christopher Ward. Toronto: Dundurn. ISBN 978-1-4597-4000-6. OCLC 1022792148.
