= Degrassi (unproduced TV series) =

Unproduced Canadian teen drama television series

- Genre: Teen drama
- Created by: Lara Azzopardi; Julia Cohen
- Developed by: Lara Azzopardi; Julia Cohen
- Country of origin: Canada
- Original language: English

Production
- Executive producers: Lara Azzopardi; Julia Cohen
- Production location: Toronto, Ontario
- Running time: approx. 60 minutes
- Production company: WildBrain Studios

Original release
- Network: Max

The Degrassi reboot series is an unproduced Canadian teen drama television series and the intended sixth overall series in the Degrassi franchise created by Kit Hood and Linda Schuyler. It was announced as an HBO Max original series in 2022 and was going to be the sixth main series and second soft reboot since the Netflix production, Degrassi: Next Class, which ended in 2017. It is also the first series in the franchise not to be helmed by Schuyler, who stated she had been hired as a consultant.

Following the January 2022 announcement, updates on its development ceased, and the Warner Bros. Discovery merger in April led to rumours of its cancellation. In November 2022, it was reported by the Wall Street Journal that the series was not moving forward. Several statements from WildBrain and Schuyler have indicated that there are still plans to produce the new Degrassi series.

== Production ==
=== Announcement and synopsis ===
On January 13, 2022, it was announced that Max gave a series order to Degrassi, a revival of the franchise of the same name consisting of 10 hour-long episodes. The announcement coincided with the platform's acquisition of all 14 seasons of Degrassi: The Next Generation, the fourth iteration of the franchise. Production was scheduled to start in Toronto in the summer of 2022.

The series was being developed by Lara Azzopardi and Julia Cohen, who recently wrote the Degrassi: The Next Generation episode "Heat of the Moment". Linda Schuyler, franchise co-creator, and Stephen Stohn, creative partner on The Next Generation, issued a joint statement confirming that they would not be involved in the new series, stating that the "time is perfect to pass the baton" to Azzopardi and Cohen. In August 2023, Schuyler revealed she had been asked by WildBrain to be a creative consultant.

The show was officially described as "a reprise of the original teen drama", focused on a group of teenagers and school faculty "living in the shadow of events that both bind them together and tear them apart". Tom Pritchard of Tom's Guide noted in May 2022, when no new details had emerged, that the offered synopsis "tells us next to nothing".

=== Cancellation and future ===
As the year progressed, there were no new details regarding the reboot or its production aside from the initial announcement. In April 2022, three months after the reboot was announced, WarnerMedia merged with Discovery, Inc., forming Warner Bros. Discovery. Following the merger, numerous original scripted Max projects were scrapped, including Batgirl, which was in post-production. By August 2022, rumours of the reboot's cancellation had begun to emerge in the wake of the news. On November 4, 2022, the Wall Street Journal reported that Degrassi was scrapped. According to The Hollywood Reporter, production had begun as planned but stopped shortly thereafter. The news triggered outcry from fans, and prompted criticism of Max. Stephen Stohn later stated on Twitter that while they weren't involved in any discussions, he and Schuyler remained hopeful that a new series would start production in the future regardless of Max's decision.

That same day, WildBrain released a statement that the company was still "committed to the future of Degrassi" and that "discussions concerning the contract with WarnerMedia are ongoing", indicating their intentions to find a new distributor. Schuyler echoed this statement in April 2023, telling the Toronto Star that WildBrain had considered the Max deal a "false start". In August 2023, Schuyler confirmed that the WarnerMedia merger was the direct cause of the November 2022 cancellation, saying "the first thing that the executives from Discovery did was to cancel the Children's and Youth Department." She also indicated that there were still plans for a new Degrassi series, but that the 2023 SAG-AFTRA strike had impacted proceedings because the series requires a degree of U.S. involvement.
