= The Kids of Degrassi Street =

1979 Canadian children's television series

- The Kids of Degrassi Street title card
- Created by: Linda Schuyler
- Starring: Stacie Mistysyn; Neil Hope; Sarah Charlesworth; Zoe Newman
- Country of origin: Canada
- No. of episodes: 26

Production
- Production company: Playing With Time, Inc.

Original release
- Network: CBC Television
- Release: September 12, 1979 – January 5, 1986

Related
- Degrassi Junior High; Degrassi High; Degrassi: The Next Generation; Degrassi: Next Class

The Kids of Degrassi Street is a Canadian children's television series created by Kit Hood and Linda Schuyler. The first entry in the Degrassi franchise and the only one to focus on children instead of teenagers, it follows the lives of a group of children living on De Grassi Street in Toronto. It was produced by Hood and Schuyler's independent company Playing With Time. The series originated as a collection of annual standalone short films that started with Ida Makes a Movie, a live-action adaptation of the Kay Chorao book which premiered on the CBC on December 8, 1979. It became a full series in 1982 when the CBC ordered five more episodes.

It is notable for featuring several actors who would later star in Degrassi Junior High and Degrassi High playing different characters.

== Development ==
Linda Schuyler, who taught grades seven and eight at Earl Grey Senior Public School in Toronto, formed the company Playing With Time with Kit Hood in 1976. At the time, Schuyler had been teaching her students an early version of media studies, which included filmmaking with Super-8 film. Discovering that there was a lack of resources on the subject, Earl Grey librarian Bruce Mackey ordered several books about filmmaking, one of which was the picture book Ida Makes a Movie, which was written by Kay Chorao.

Neither were aware that Ida Makes A Movie was a preschool book, in which the titular character was a cat. Nonetheless, Schuyler felt the story was powerful, and became interested in making a live-action adaptation, featuring children instead of cats. She sought the advice of then-lawyer and future Epitome Pictures co-founder Stephen Stohn, who advised her to forego a lawyer, and instead propose the deal herself. Schuyler flew to New York, where she met with Chorao and secured a $200 deal to adapt the book into a movie. Yan Moore, who would eventually become Degrassi Junior High and Degrassi High's head writer, became a writer for the series after he rectified problems with the story of the episode Casey Draws The Line.

== Filming ==
The series was shot in Toronto, with many of the scenes being shot on Degrassi Street itself.

=== Opening sequence and music ===
The opening sequence consists of a short piano piece, set to black and white stills of the Leslieville neighbourhood.

Wendy Watson and Lewis Manne, who later composed the music for Degrassi Junior High and Degrassi High, composed the music for The Kids Of Degrassi Street, with John Forbes initially performing the music on a Fairlight CMI.

== Cast ==
The Kids of Degrassi Street featured many of the same actors who would later appear on Degrassi Junior High and Degrassi High, including Stacie Mistysyn, Neil Hope, Anais Granofsky, Sarah Charlesworth, John Ioannou, in different unrelated roles.

- Zoë Newman as Ida Lucas (episodes 1–5, 9–10, 13, 23)
- Dawn Harrison as Catherine "Cookie" Peters (episodes 1–3, 11)
- Allan Meiusi as Fred Lucas (episodes 1–3, 5)
- Peter Duckworth-Pilkington as Noel Canard (episodes 2–7, 9, 14)
- Nancy Lam as Sara (episode 2) & Irene Chow (episodes 3, 5, 10)
- Stacie Mistysyn as Lisa Canard (episodes 4–5, 7–11, 14, 17–18, 20–26), later appears as Caitlin Ryan on Degrassi Junior High and Degrassi High
- Nick Goddard as Chuck Riley (episodes 4–6, 8–10)
- Sarah Charlesworth as Casey Rothfels (episodes 5, 7, 10–11, 14, 16–17, 19–26), later appears as Susie Rivera on Degrassi Junior High
- Stacey Halberstadt as Sophie Brendakis (episode 6)
- John Ioannou as Pete Riley (episodes 8–10, 12, 14–17, 19–26), later appears as Alex Yankou on Degrassi Junior High and Degrassi High
- Jamie Summerfield as Martin Schlegel (episodes 8–9, 13, 15–16, 21–24, 26)
- Tyson Talbot as Billy Martin (episodes 8–10, 12, 14–15, 19, 21, 23–26), later appears as Jason Cox on Degrassi Junior High
- Christopher Charlesworth as Benjamin Martin (episodes 10, 12, 15, 19, 23–24), later appears as Scooter Webster on Degrassi Junior High and Degrassi High
- Geneviève Appleton as Liz Jacobs (episodes 11, 13, 16, 20)
- Rachel Blanchard as Melanie Schlegel (episodes 13, 15)
- Neil Hope as Robin "Griff" Griffith (episodes 15, 17, 19–26), later appears as Derek "Wheels" Wheeler on Degrassi Junior High and Degrassi High
- Danah Jean Brown as Connie Jacobs (episodes 16–17, 19–26), later appears as Trish Skye on Degrassi Junior High and Degrassi High
- Tanya Schmalfuss as Samantha (episode 18)
- Arlene Lott as Rachel Hewitt (episodes 19, 21–26), later appears as Nancy Kramer on Degrassi Junior High and Degrassi High
- Matthew Roberts as Jeffrey Clayton (episode 20, 24, 26)
- Anais Granofsky as Karen Gillis (episodes 21–26), later appears as Lucy Fernandez on Degrassi Junior High and Degrassi High
- Ryan Anderson as Ryan (episode 23)

== Episodes ==
No.	Title	Original release date	Prod. code
1	"Ida Makes a Movie"	September 12, 1979	101
When Ida Lucas' movie on garbage wins first prize in a competition, but the judges commend her film on war, she has to decide between accepting the prize, and owning up to the truth.
2	"Cookie Goes to the Hospital"	September 1, 1980	201
When Cookie goes to hospital without her doll, Ida and Noel, having sworn a pledge of loyalty, have to get it out to her somehow, but the hospital is a pretty scary place.
3	"Irene Moves In"	September 1, 1981	301
When Irene comes to live on Degrassi Street, Ida thinks she is just a little too friendly with Cookie. But Irene is not the only newcomer to Degrassi Street. Reports are circulating that Bigfoot has been seen in the neighbourhood.
4	"Noel Buys a Suit"	May 30, 1982	302
When Noel's dad decides to get married again, Noel is not so sure he likes the idea. Gayle is ruining everything, changing the house around, and she does not like the terrific checked suit Noel has bought for the wedding.
5	"Lisa Makes the Headlines"	December 13, 1982	401
What Lisa needs to make her newspaper is a real scoop. But when she does find some real news, she has to decide which is more important - the truth or family loyalty.
6	"Sophie Minds the Store"	December 20, 1982	402
Sophie gets Chuck to help her out at her parents' store, but the cash is out by $20 at the end of the day. Chuck's father is in jail, so it appears that it must be like father, like son.
7	"Casey Draws the Line"	December 27, 1982	403
When a new survey line goes through the pen of the rabbit Casey and Lisa share, too much arguing over rights makes them lose sight of their responsibilities - to look after Rabbit.
8	"Pete Takes a Chance"	January 2, 1983	404
Pete always has his eye out for a money-making proposition, and he knows he has found a winner, but he just needs a little capital. However, his "investment" costs him more than he expected, when he puts his friendships on the line.
9	"Chuck Makes a Choice"	September 1, 1983	501
Chuck has told Tina his dad is a pilot, but Pete insists on inviting their father to the school play. Chuck has to decide if the only way he can he hide the fact that his father is actually finishing up his time behind bars is by un-inviting him.
10	"Billy Breaks the Chain"	November 9, 1984	601
Billy knows it will not be luck that sends him to hockey camp, it will be his own hard work. Then a bad-luck chain letter comes to him, and while he hesitates about passing on the bad luck, disasters begin to occur.
11	"Catherine Finds Her Balance"	November 16, 1984	602
When both divorced parents want to come and watch her at the gymnastics meet, Catherine gets involved in some fancy footwork to prevent them from making a scene in front of the whole school.
12	"Benjamin Walks the Dog"	November 23, 1984	603
Billy and Pete want to do grown up things, without Billy's pesky little brother, Benjamin. They finally get rid of him, but Billy has second thoughts when it looks like they might have gotten rid of him forever.
13	"Liz Sits the Schlegels"	November 30, 1984	604
Liz finds she has her hands full when she takes on a babysitting job with two lively kids, and one who refuses to have anything to do with her.
14	"The Canards Move Out"	December 14, 1984	605
Lisa simply does not want to leave Degrassi Street and move to Vancouver, but it seems no one will listen to her feelings on the subject. In fact, her feelings are so strong she is having trouble listening to anyone else's.
15	"Martin Meets the Pirates"	January 4, 1985	606
Martin cannot believe the Pirates from Boulton Ave. want him as area lieutenant for their expansion to Degrassi Street - they are the toughest gang around. But he is not sure that he is that tough.
16	"Connie Goes to Court"	January 11, 1985	607
When Connie returns five dollars Casey has dropped on the floor, Casey thinks Connie is contributing her share for the present for their teacher, and does not pay attention to Connie's explanations. Connie is not worried - she will be collecting for her paper route on Wednesday, anyway, and she can pay up then. But the paper goes on strike, and Connie finds herself in more trouble than she thought.
17	"Griff Makes a Date"	January 18, 1985	608
No one really likes Griff - after all, he used to be a Pirate - but it does not matter much to him, until he meets Lisa, just back from Vancouver.
18	"Samantha Gets a Visitor"	January 25, 1985	609
Samantha cannot wait for her city slicker cousin, Lisa, to arrive for the weekend. She is so sophisticated now she just knows that Lisa will be impressed.
19	"Rachel Runs for Office"	February 1, 1985	610
Rachel is very keen to be her school's representative to the new City Hall Youth Council. She is interested in the issues and is ready to work hard. But Billy's break dancing and Pete's campaign management have put Billy well in the lead.
20	"Jeffrey Finds a Friend"	February 8, 1985	611
Jeffrey is supposed to be the smartest kid in the class, and he is mortified when Connie, who claims she never studies, beats him on a math test - in fact, she bets that she can beat him on the next one, too.
21	"Connie Makes a Catch"	December 1, 1985	701
Connie has her eye on Candy, the popular captain of the baseball team, but he does not even know she exists. She would do anything to catch his eye, and everyone has advice to offer, but being a "lady" is tough for a tomboy like Connie who would rather be playing baseball.
22	"Karen Keeps Her Word"	December 8, 1985	702
Money is on everyone's mind as the yearbook is in desperate financial straits. But Karen is not remotely interested in the yearbook's problems, or in the class voting itself a nuclear-free zone. She has found a pair of roller skates that are destined for her feet - all she needs now is the money to buy them.
23	"Ryan Runs for Help"	December 15, 1985	703
Ryan is always making up stories, and it is hard to know when he is telling the truth. But his best friend Benjamin is convinced of Ryan's tales of treasure when Ryan produces evidence - he actually has a gold coin he found. Even though he is grounded, Benjamin sneaks out to a construction site to investigate with Ryan, and ends up falling down a hole and cannot get out.
24	"Martin Hears the Music"	December 22, 1985	704
Nobody wants to be different from everyone else, and Martin is horrified to discover that he is going to have to wear a hearing aid. And it certainly does not help that everybody starts acting so weird around him.
25	"Lisa Gets the Picture"	December 29, 1985	705
The Yearbook needs pictures. Lisa sees her chance to spend some time with Griff when Casey comes up with a brilliant plan - Griff can draw caricatures of everyone.
26	"Griff Gets a Hand"	January 5, 1986	706
Robin "Griff" Griffith is having trouble with schoolwork. He would rather be drawing pictures than studying, and when his friend Danny, the crossing guard, asks for a caricature of himself, Griff is determined to make it his best ever. But Danny suddenly dies of a stroke, and Griff just cannot stand that he did not finish the caricature in time.

== Broadcast ==
Ida Makes A Movie premiered on CBC on September 12, 1979. (Note: Degrassi Generations: The Official 411 states that it premiered on September 20, 1980. (Ellis 2005, pp. 10)) By 1982, the CBC, enamored with the short films that Hood and Schuyler were producing, ordered five more, effectively turning the annual movies into a television series. In the lead-up to Degrassi Junior High, the series was re-run on Sundays at 5:00pm, until it was replaced by its successor in the same timeslot. In the United Kingdom, the series debuted on BBC One on July 9, 1984, with the final episode airing on June 16, 1986. In Australia, the series debuted at 6:00pm on February 2, 1987, on ABC TV.

== Print media ==
In late 1986, James Lorimer & Company published a series of illustrated paperback books based on the television series, written by Schuyler and Hood with the assistance of author Eve Jennings.

== Home media ==
On July 31, 2007, WGBH Boston Home Video released The Kids of Degrassi Street: The Complete Series on DVD in Region 1.

In Region 4, Beyond Home Entertainment released the entire series on DVD in Australia on March 12, 2008.

DVD name	Ep #	Region 1	Region 2	Region 4
The Kids of Degrassi Street: The Complete Series	26	July 31, 2007	February 11, 2008 (Vol.1)	March 12, 2008

== See also ==
- Degrassi Junior High - The immediate successor of The Kids Of Degrassi Street, featuring several cast members from this series

== Sources ==
- Ellis, Kathryn (2005). The official 411 Degrassi generations. Fenn Pub. Co. ISBN 1-55168-278-8. OCLC 59136593.
