= Dawson casting =

Casting of actors as younger characters

Dawson casting is a cultural phenomenon and trope observed in film and television in which many of the actors appear and are actually much older than the characters they portray.

== Background ==
The concept was used in the critical approach of teen dramas such as Glee, Gossip Girl, Pretty Little Liars, or Do revenge, for example, where adults are cast to play teenage characters. The term was coined after Dawson’s Creek, in which the cast members are much older than the characters they are portraying.

An example of this is Pretty Little Liars character Spencer Hastings, who is 16 but is portrayed by actress Troian Bellisario, who was 24 years old at the time of shooting. Derry Girls is a non-American example of Dawson casting of teenage characters. The term was originally circulated on the Internet in response to the casting choices of Dawson's Creek, though the phenomenon predates that series, with examples such as the 1948 film Joan of Arc, the 1978 film Grease, the 1985 film The Breakfast Club, and the 1990s teen drama series Beverly Hills, 90210 casting actors in their twenties and thirties to play high-school aged students.

== Criticism ==
Canadian teen drama franchise Degrassi is often noted and praised for being one of the few major exceptions to the trope within the genre (along with Skins), casting most of its actors age-appropriately. Franchise co-creator Linda Schuyler has been a critic of the practice as early as 1986, during the development of Degrassi Junior High, where she stated that the show would cast age-appropriately due to the fact that "so much of the American stuff set in high schools is played by late teens and early 20s - and then some". She further elaborated to IndieWire in 2016 that "I like to talk about the fact that you can take a 25-year-old who looks 15 and have them play a role, but that actor is bringing 10 more years of life experience to that role. By having our cast be age-appropriate, they bring the freshness and the authenticity of that age." Samantha Wilson of Film School Rejects cites the trope as having contributed to the failure of the American adaptation of Skins.

== Social ramifications ==
It has been suggested on several occasions by critics that Dawson casting has several negative implications, specifically for adolescents. These commonly include accusations of unrealistic beauty standards, negative body image, low self-esteem, and general mental health problems, especially in regard to one's self-perception.

A clinical psychologist, Barbara Greenberg, told Teen Vogue that casting actors in their twenties for the roles of high-school students can worsen the struggles of adolescents, stating "It can give the message that they’re supposed to look good all the time", adding "That leads to all kinds of body-image and social-comparison issues".

MTV's adaptation of Skins generated controversy over its sexual content and raised accusations of child pornography, since many of the actors were under the age of 18. Outcry from the Parents Television Council, along with numerous companies pulling their advertising from the program, led to the series being canceled after one season of ten episodes.

== See also ==
- 13 Reasons Why - another teen-related drama that also cast 20-something actors
- Teen sitcom
- After school special
