= Epitome Pictures =

Defunct Canadian film and television production company

Coordinates: 43°43′11″N 79°18′58″W

Epitome Pictures Inc.
- Logo used from 2011 to 2014
- Type: Division
- Industry: Film production Television production
- Predecessor: Playing With Time, Inc.
- Founded: 1992; 34 years ago
- Defunct: April 2, 2019; 7 years ago
- Fate: Folded into DHX Media
- Successor: DHX Studios
- Headquarters: 220 Bartley Drive, Toronto, Ontario, Canada
- Key people: Linda Schuyler (COO); Stephen Stohn (President)
- Services: Production, distribution, broadcast, and licensing of entertainment content for children and families
- Parent: DHX Media (2014–2019)
- Website: epitomepictures.com at the Wayback Machine (archived February 8, 2016)

Epitome Pictures Inc. (later known as DHX Studios Toronto) was a Canadian film and television production company based in Toronto, Ontario. Founded by Linda Schuyler and Stephen Stohn in 1992, the company is best known for producing Degrassi: The Next Generation and Degrassi: Next Class, the fourth and fifth respective entries of the Degrassi teen drama franchise, of which was co-created by Schuyler. Other television series produced by Epitome include Liberty Street, Riverdale, and The L.A. Complex.

Epitome was acquired by DHX Media in 2014.

== History ==
Linda Schuyler and Stephen Stohn founded Epitome Pictures in 1992, and purchased its first studio building in 1995, to film Riverdale. At the time, the studio was allegedly "in a sorry state, with snow melting on the leaking roof and cans catching the water". Its main headquarters were located on a 100,000 square-foot lot in Bartley Drive in Toronto, Ontario. In April 2014, the company and its library, including the Degrassi series produced before Epitome (The Kids of Degrassi Street, Degrassi Junior High, Degrassi High, and the non-fiction documentary series Degrassi Talks), was acquired by fellow Canadian television producer DHX Media for $33 million.

After the buyout, Epitome's assets were absorbed into DHX Media. On April 2, 2019, as part of a strategic review, DHX announced plans to sell the Bartley Drive studios for $12 million to help pay down its debts.

== Playing With Time, Inc. ==
Playing With Time, Inc. was a Canadian film and television production company based in Toronto, Ontario, and the predecessor of Epitome Pictures. Founded by Linda Schuyler and Kit Hood in 1976, the company is best known for producing The Kids of Degrassi Street, as well as Degrassi Junior High and Degrassi High, the first, second, and third respective entries of the Degrassi franchise. Schuyler, a Grade 7 and Grade 8 media teacher at Earl Grey Senior Public School in Toronto in 1976, met Hood, then an editor for television commercials, when she needed help from an experienced editor to save the "muddled footage" of one of her projects. Hood and Schuyler found a balance; editor Hood was inexperienced in writing, and Schuyler was inexperienced in editing, leading to their creative partnership. The production offices were located on 935 Queen Street East, where the Degrassi Junior High and Degrassi High cast would routinely gather to be taken to the schools where the respective series were filmed.

Epitome Pictures later owned the rights to the three previous Degrassi shows produced by Playing With Time.

== Filmography ==
=== Playing With Time, Inc. ===
- Jimmy: Playing With Time (short film)
- Our Cultural Fabric (1978, short film)
- The Kids of Degrassi Street (1979–1986)
- Growing Up with Sandy Offenheim (1980, five shorts)
- Pearls in the Alphabet Soup (1980, short film)
- Don't Call Me Stupid (1983, short film)
- Advice on Lice (1985, short film)
- OWL/TV (1985–1986) ("Real Kids" segments)
- Degrassi Junior High (1987–1989)
- Degrassi High (1989–1991)
- Degrassi Talks (1992)
- School's Out (1992)

=== Epitome Pictures ===
- X-Rated (1993, TV movie)
- Liberty Street (1995)
- Riverdale (1997–2000)
- Degrassi: The Next Generation (2001–2015) (co-production with Bell Media)
- Instant Star (2004–2008)
- Degrassi Goes Hollywood (2009, movie)
- Degrassi Takes Manhattan (2010, movie)
- The L.A. Complex (2012)
- Open Heart (2015)
- Make It Pop (2015–2016) (co-production with Tom Lynch Company, N'Credible Entertainment, and Nickelodeon)
- The Other Kingdom (2016) (co-production with Tom Lynch Company and Nickelodeon)
- Degrassi: Next Class (2016–2017)
- Letterkenny (2016–2019)
- Massive Monster Mayhem (2017)
