= Playing With Time, Inc. =

Film and television production company in Toronto, Canada

- Industry: Film and television production
- Founded: 1976; 49 years ago
- Founder: Kit Hood; Linda Schuyler
- Defunct: 1998; 27 years ago
- Fate: Dormancy
- Successor: Epitome Pictures
- Headquarters: 935 Queen Street East, Toronto, Ontario, Canada

Playing With Time, Inc. was a Canadian independent film and television production company based in Toronto, Ontario. Founded by Linda Schuyler and Kit Hood in 1976, it is best known for being the original production company for the Degrassi television franchise, producing The Kids of Degrassi Street (1979–86), Degrassi Junior High (1987–89), and Degrassi High (1989–91). It also produced educational short films throughout its existence. The company's work was known for its unconventional filmmaking practices, including casting ordinary people in lieu of experienced trained actors. Schuyler founded Epitome Pictures in 1992, leaving Hood in sole control of the company. By 1998, it was dormant.

== History ==
Schuyler, a Grade 7 and Grade 8 media teacher at Earl Grey Senior Public School in Toronto in 1976, met Hood, then an editor for television commercials, when she needed help from an experienced editor to save the "muddled footage" of one of her projects. Hood and Schuyler found a balance; editor Hood was inexperienced in writing, and writer/producer Schuyler was inexperienced in editing, leading to their creative partnership. The first film produced by the company was Jimmy: Playing With Time, about a 73 year old marathon piano player who attempts to break his own world record by playing non-stop for 117 hours at the Canadian National Exhibition.

The production offices were located on 935 Queen Street East, an over 100-year-old storefront building where the Degrassi Junior High and Degrassi High cast would routinely gather to be taken via minivan to the set. According to Hood, Schuyler would temporarily assume the name Time to Play, before founding Epitome Pictures with Stephen Stohn in 1992. Hood began operating under the name Timeless Productions. By July 1998, Playing With Time was no longer producing television shows, but remained semi-active, with Hood continuing to sit on the board of the non-profit Playing With Time Foundation. He also still owned the production office. Hood later rented it out as a shelter for abused women and children, families experiencing housing crises, and refugees.

After its dissolution, Epitome Pictures assumed the rights to the Degrassi shows produced by Playing With Time. Material relating to Playing With Time's work, including The Kids of Degrassi Street and Degrassi Junior High, is held in the Epitome Pictures archives at the University of Toronto.

== Casting practices ==
The company became known for casting ordinary people in their work, as opposed to professional or experienced actors. In 1983, Linda Schuyler explained that trained actors were "overblown and stagey" and would ruin the natural effect of their work. The actors were also encouraged to make their own contributions or corrections to the scripts of the shows produced by the company. Both Schuyler and Hood stated that they disliked the term "star" to refer to their actors, instead considering their productions a team effort; anybody involved in the production, including Schuyler and Hood themselves, would be used as extras or background characters.

=== Repertory company ===
Playing With Time was notable for its usage of a repertory company (referred to by PWT insiders as the 'Repco'), which at its peak consisted of sixty-five kids. The repertory company consisted mostly of the cast members of Degrassi Junior High and Degrassi High, although certain actors would appear in other films made by the company. The repertory company system led to an unconventional approach in which minor cast members could be promoted to a bigger role at random, whereas major cast members could occasionally serve as just background extras, giving a majority of the actors significant focus at various times throughout Degrassi's run.

During the second season of Degrassi Junior High, the company established the Playing With Time Foundation, a non-profit organization that provided support to active members of the repertory company. The foundation gave its actors "scholarships", and also helped fund the independent video creations of some of its cast members. Through the organization, actors such as Neil Hope (who played Wheels) created their own movies; Hope directed a video called The Darker Side, a documentary about the children of alcoholics, and another film named Blood, Sweat, and Tears, that starred several of his co-stars. Schuyler stated that she encouraged the teenage actors to try their hand at film and television production themselves, as a result of being regularly exposed to it.

== Filmography ==
- Jimmy: Playing With Time (short film)
- Our Cultural Fabric (1978, short film)
- The Kids of Degrassi Street (1979–1986)
- Growing Up with Sandy Offenheim (1980, five shorts)
- Pearls in the Alphabet Soup (1980, short film)
- Don't Call Me Stupid (1983, short film)
- Advice on Lice (1985, short film)
- OWL/TV (1985–1986) ("Real Kids" segments)
- Danger Keep Out! (1987) (co-production with the Construction Safety Association of Toronto)
- Degrassi Junior High (1987–1989)
- Degrassi High (1989–1991)
- Degrassi Talks (1992)
- School's Out (1992)

== Sources ==
- Ellis, Kathryn (2005). The official 411 Degrassi generations. Fenn Pub. Co. ISBN 1-55168-278-8. OCLC 59136593.
