= De Grassi Street =

Street in Toronto, Ontario, Canada

Coordinates: 43°39′48″N 79°20′50″W

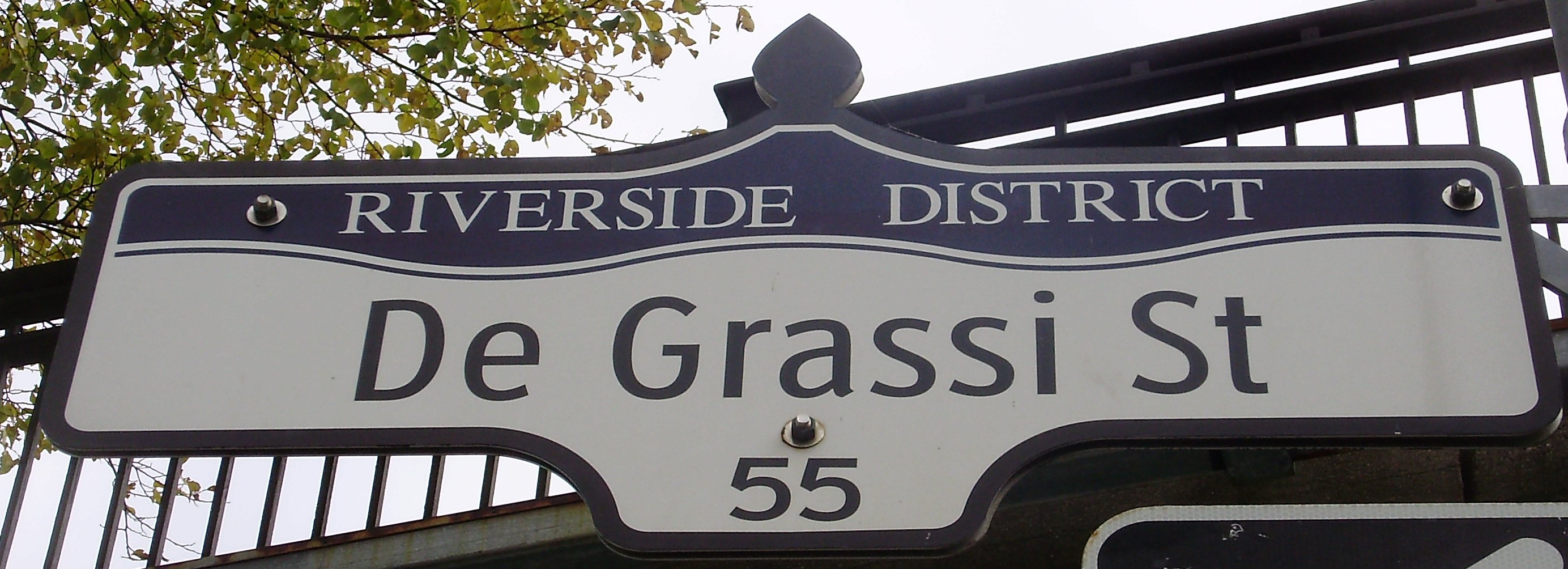
A De Grassi Street sign.

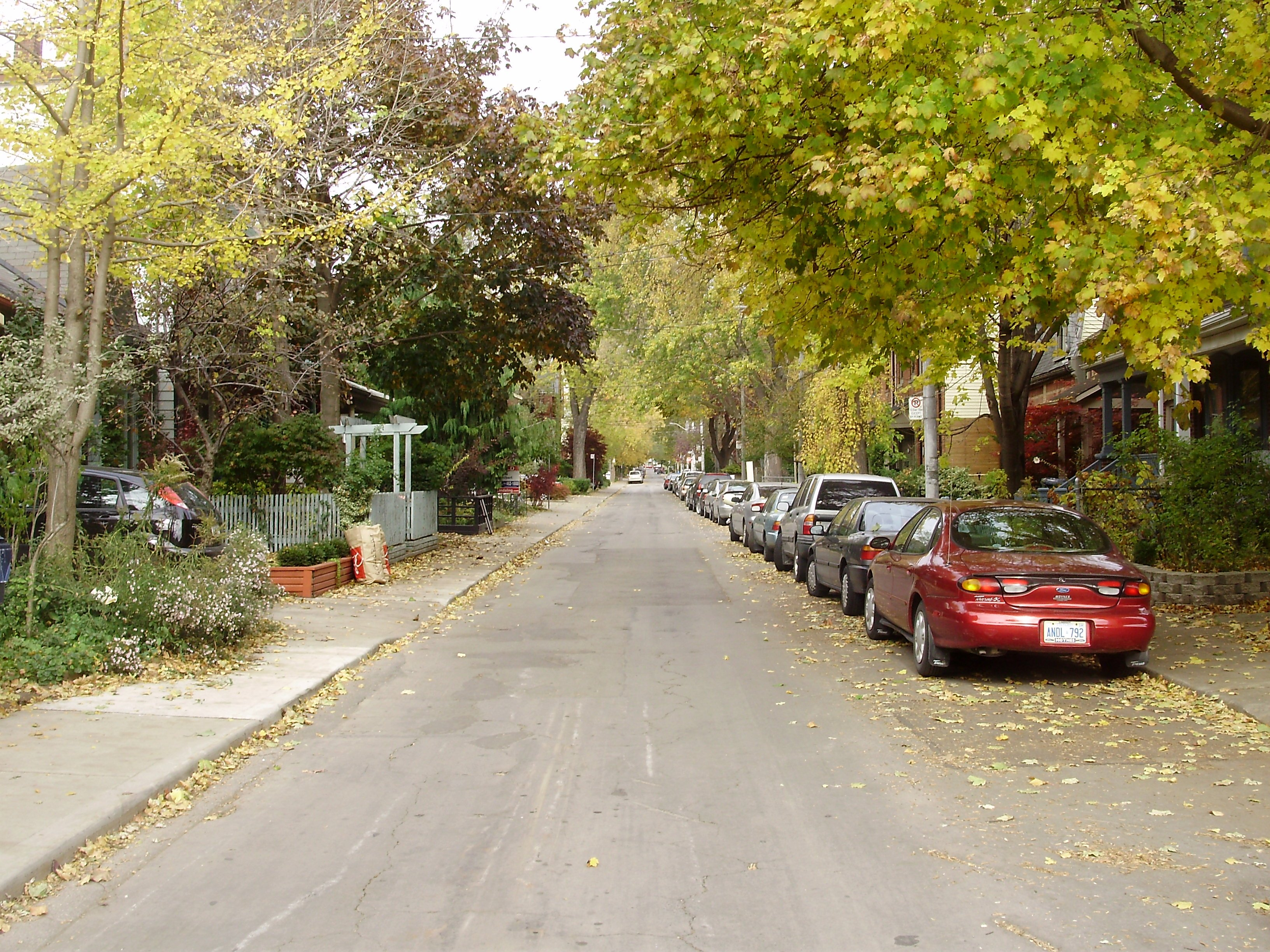
Autumn trees lean over De Grassi Street.

De Grassi Street is a side street located in Toronto, Ontario, Canada. It was named after Captain Filippo "Philip" De Grassi, an Italian-born soldier who immigrated to Canada with his family in 1831 and settled in York, Upper Canada. He later became a member of the Family Compact.

De Grassi Street is located in south Riverdale, and has a residential character. A number of the homes date back to the 1880s and were built in the distinctive tall, narrow bay-and-gable style. It runs one-way northbound from Queen Street East to Gerrard Street, approximately halfway between Broadview and Carlaw Avenues.

It is best known in popular culture as the namesake of the teen drama television franchise Degrassi, with the first three series shot in and around the street.

== Neighbourhoods ==
- Queen-Broadview Village – at Queen Street
- Riverside (Queen Street East from the Don Valley east to De Grassi Street)
- East Chinatown – at Gerrard Street

== Attractions ==
- Jimmie Simpson Park – named after former Toronto mayor James Simpson
- Bruce Mackey Park – named after a Toronto District School Board educator whose house was used in The Kids of Degrassi Street.
- First Nations Public School
- Eastdale Collegiate Institute
- Site of Riverdale Station, which was demolished in 1972.

== In fiction ==
The street was made internationally famous by the Degrassi series of television shows for youth. Producers of the show slightly altered the spelling of the street's name. The first Degrassi series, The Kids of Degrassi Street on CBC Television, was set on the street with some exterior shots in the actual neighbourhood, but was filmed elsewhere:

- Vincent Massey Public School – 68 Daisy Avenue, Mimico – Degrassi Junior High, seen on CBC Television (1987–1989) in Canada and on PBS in the United States.
- Centennial College – 951 Carlaw Ave (Centre for Creative Communication) – Degrassi High, seen on CBC Television (1989–1991) in Canada and on PBS in the United States.
- The following Degrassi series, Degrassi: The Next Generation, which was largely shot on a studio backlot, was seen on CTV (first run 2001–2009; syndication 2001–present), CTV Two (syndication), and MuchMusic (first run 2010–2015) in Canada, and on Noggin during "The N" block (first run), TeenNick (first run, 2009–2015) and MTV (syndication) in the United States.
- The most recent series Degrassi: Next Class, is shot in the same location as The Next Generation, and is seen on Family (2016–2017) in Canada, and Netflix (2016–2017) in the United States.
