= Degrassi =

Canadian teen drama franchise

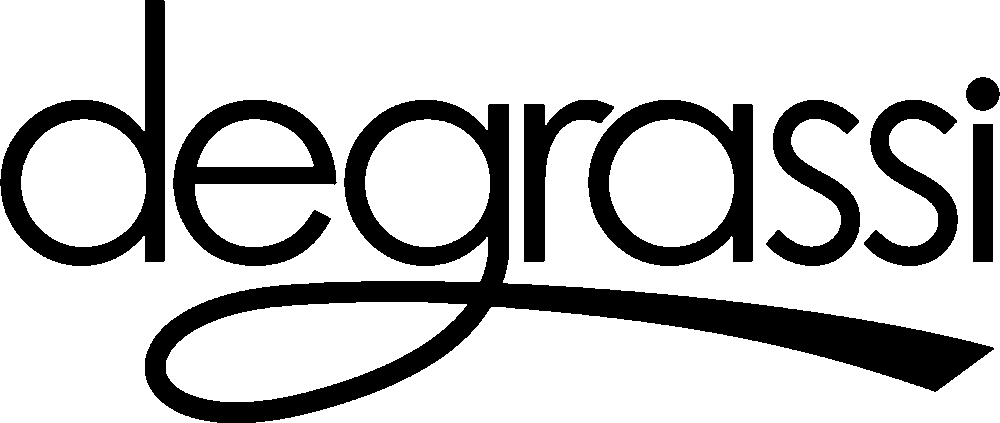
- The Degrassi logo used from 2013 to 2017. A variation of this logo was used for Degrassi: Next Class (with the subtitle below the long "g") from 2016 to 2017.
- Created by: Kit Hood; Linda Schuyler
- Original work: "Ida Makes a Movie" (The Kids of Degrassi Street)
- Owner: WildBrain
- Years: 1979–present

Print publications
- Novels: Kids of Degrassi Street novels; Degrassi Junior High and Degrassi High novels
- Graphic novel: Degrassi: Extra Credit

Films and television
- Television series: The Kids of Degrassi Street (1979–1986); Degrassi Junior High (1987–1989); Degrassi High (1989–1991); Degrassi: The Next Generation (2001–2015); Degrassi: Next Class (2016–2017); Degrassi (cancelled)
- Web series: Degrassi Minis (2005–2016)
- Television special: Degrassi Talks (1992)
- Television films: School's Out! (1992); Degrassi Goes Hollywood (2009); Degrassi Takes Manhattan (2010); Don't Look Back (2015)

Audio
- Soundtracks: Degrassi soundtracks

Miscellaneous
- Production companies: Playing With Time, Inc. (1979–1992); Epitome Pictures (2001–2017); DHX Media (2014–2017); WildBrain (2023–present)
- Networks: Canada: CBC (1979–1992); CTV (2001–2009); MuchMusic (2010–2013); MTV Canada (2013–2015); Family Channel (2016–2017)

Official website
- http://www.degrassi.tv

Degrassi is a Canadian teen drama television franchise created by Kit Hood and Linda Schuyler, that follows the lives of youths attending the eponymous secondary school in Toronto. Each entry since 1987 has followed the same continuity. It is regarded as one of Canada's most successful media exports. Outside of television, the franchise comprises a variety of other media, such as companion novels, graphic novels, documentaries, soundtracks, and non-fiction works.

The franchise originated in the late 1970s, when ex-schoolteacher Schuyler formed a partnership with editor Hood to produce educational films and documentaries. The television success of Ida Makes a Movie (1979), a short film based on a book by Kay Chorao, on the CBC, led to the pair creating subsequent installments which eventually began airing under the name The Kids of Degrassi Street (1982–1986). By the mid-1980s, the aging cast inspired the pair to develop a new series, Degrassi Junior High (1987–1989). Regarded as the first modern television teen drama, Degrassi Junior High gained widespread acclaim and established the franchise as a Canadian cultural icon. It enjoyed further acclaim and success after rebranding to Degrassi High (1989–1991), which chronicled the Degrassi Junior High cast's high school years. Creative exhaustion largely contributed to the franchise's initial end with the controversial post-graduation television film School's Out (1992), which drew double the average viewership of the series, followed by the non-fiction documentary miniseries Degrassi Talks (1992), in which actors spoke to teens nationwide about various issues.

Degrassi Junior High and Degrassi High experienced sustained success in re-runs and syndication throughout the 1990s, aided by the emergence of online fan websites. A successful televised cast reunion in 1999 ultimately resulted in Schuyler creating a revival series, Degrassi: The Next Generation (2001–2015), which originally aired on CTV in Canada and The N in the United States. It focused on a new generation of students, augmented by select original characters in supporting roles. While respectably successful in Canada, The Next Generation made a significantly larger impact in the United States, and is credited with launching the careers of rapper Drake and actress Nina Dobrev. After nine seasons, The Next Generation was cancelled by CTV due to declining ratings; a subsequent deal with TeenNick resulted in a major retool of the series, its name changed simply to Degrassi and the format changed to a style reminiscent of telenovela. After five more seasons, it was cancelled by TeenNick in 2015. A deal with Netflix resulted in the short-lived co-production Degrassi: Next Class (2016–2017), which was geared toward Generation Z. It was cancelled in 2017, though this was not revealed until 2019. In January 2022, a new series was announced for HBO Max in which Schuyler would not be involved. It was ultimately cancelled as a result of the Warner Bros. Discovery merger, though WildBrain has indicated that they still intend to produce the series.

Degrassi has been widely acclaimed by critics over its four-decade history for its sympathetic portrayal of youth experiences and perceived authenticity compared to other teen-oriented media. It has faced international scrutiny and censorship since the late 1980s, particularly in regards to episodes depicting teenage pregnancy, abortion, and LGBT issues. Among the awards and accolades it has received include numerous Gemini Awards, two International Emmy Awards in 1985 and 1987, and a Peabody Award in 2010. The franchise was inducted into Canada's Walk of Fame in December 2023.

== History ==
=== 1979–1986: The Kids of Degrassi Street ===
In 1976, Linda Schuyler, a Grade 7 and Grade 8 media teacher at Earl Grey Senior Public School in Toronto, founded Playing With Time Inc. with her partner Kit Hood. Schuyler had met Hood, who had a career in editing television commercials, when she needed help from an experienced editor to save the "muddled footage" of one of her projects. As a media teacher, Schuyler encouraged her students to use video as a narrative tool. Bruce Mackey, Earl Grey's librarian and a friend of Schuyler, procured her several books about filmmaking upon her request, one being Ida Makes a Movie, by the American author Kay Chorao. Mackey did not realize that it was a children's book and discarded it, but Schuyler developed an interest in adapting the book into a film. Before leaving, Schuyler sought legal advice from Stephen Stohn, a young entertainment lawyer who had recently graduated from law school, and who would eventually become her producing partner and husband.

Stohn recalled in his 2018 memoir Whatever It Takes that he advised Schuyler that being out of print, buying the rights to the book on her own would be "relatively straightforward", and that involving lawyers would make the process "unnecessarily complicated." Stohn instead gave Schuyler a boilerplate form for permission to take with her to New York. Schuyler purchased the rights for $200. The feline characters were changed into human children, and the story was also largely repurposed. The film featured production techniques that Schuyler and Kit Hood felt were missing from children's programming: it was shot in a cinéma vérité style, with handheld camera work and entirely on-location shooting. Mackey offered his home, 98 De Grassi Street, as a filming location.

Ida Makes a Movie premiered on CBC Television on December 8, 1979. Over the next couple of years, the network ordered two more short films. By 1982, they ordered five more episodes, developing the series of short films into a television series named The Kids of Degrassi Street. In 1985, the episode Griff Gets A Hand (which starred future "Wheels" actor Neil Hope as Griff) received an International Emmy Award for Best Children & Young People.

=== 1986–1990: Degrassi Junior High, Degrassi High, and international success ===
A new Degrassi series began development in 1986, this time with new characters and centered around the fictional eponymous school near the same street. The first actor to audition for the new Degrassi series was Pat Mastroianni, who would later win the role of Joey Jeremiah. Several of the actors from The Kids of Degrassi Street would return with new roles, including Neil Hope, Stacie Mistysyn, Anais Granofsky, and Sarah Charlesworth. It was at this time that Playing With Time Inc. started a repertory company, with fifty children selected from auditions. The workshops, created and facilitate by Judy Shiner, would be repeated at the beginning of production for each season, as new cast members joined, and existing cast members underwent more advanced workshops. The repertory company also meant that even major characters could be relegated to the background if not the main focus of the episode, which according to Kathryn Ellis, was "nearly unheard-of on other television shows." Conversely, a background character could later be given more lines or a full role.

The cast would have significant input into the writing of their characters, with Schuyler seeking opinions during every read-through, and cast members often talking about their experiences to writer Yan Moore, who would eventually adapt said experiences to their characters. The resulting series, Degrassi Junior High, premiered on CBC on January 18, 1987. The series marked the beginning of the franchise's canon, as characters from this series would appear as adults in later installments. The show also aired on PBS in the United States starting from September 1987. The show would feature one of the franchise's most well-known and influential storylines, in which 14 year old Christine "Spike" Nelson, portrayed by Amanda Stepto, becomes pregnant. The episode in which she discovers her pregnancy, "It's Late", the eleventh episode of the show's first season, would win an International Emmy Award, for which Emma Nelson, Spike's daughter and central character of the later series, was named. The popularity of the show led to international publicity tours by members of the cast throughout North America and parts of Europe.

Upon its debut, it immediately garnered critical acclaim in Canada, where it was considered to be an alternative to the American sitcoms of the era that were perceived as unrealistic and heavy-handed in their portrayal of societal issues. Although not as well known in the United States, it drew similar praise from the American media. Initially aired on Sundays at 5:00pm, Canadian critics believed the show deserved a better timeslot; Ivan Fecan, then the programming chief for CBC, was also a champion of the series, and had the series moved to primetime on Mondays at 8:30pm, in between Kate & Allie and Newhart. When Fecan called Schuyler to inform her of the move, she reportedly disagreed, feeling that the series wasn't ready for prime time. She eventually agreed to the decision, under the condition that if the move was unsuccessful, the series wouldn't be cancelled and instead be moved back to its original timeslot. After its move to prime time, the viewership increased by 40%, and by August 1988, it had become the highest-rated Canadian-made drama in Canada. The series also premiered in the United Kingdom on BBC1 in 1988, where it drew in a reported six million viewers, making it the highest-rated children's television series in the country and the show's largest audience. However, in spite of a publicity tour by actress Amanda Stepto, controversial episodes from its first season, including those centred on Stepto's character's pregnancy, were aired in a later timeslot on BBC2, and the network did not air its second and third seasons. The series established the franchise's popularity and longevity. By the time its follow-up began, it amassed over a million viewers weekly in Canada. In November 1988, after the premiere of the third and final season of Degrassi Junior High, Linda Schuyler alluded to the potential of a high-school followup when discussing the direction of the franchise with the Montreal Gazette, although she was unsure if it would go forward. It was decided to continue into high school as the actors were becoming older, which would also make way for more controversial topics, including abortion, which was addressed in the series premiere. According to Schuyler: "As the kids get older, the only way we can remain true to this age group is by growing with them. Therefore, the issues get more complex."

In the series finale of Degrassi Junior High, the titular school is destroyed in a fire. To keep the entire cast together, a creative decision was made to move the younger students displaced by the fire to the new school to join those that had already graduated. Conversely, the grade 7 students introduced in the third season of Degrassi Junior High were accelerated to grade 9 for an unspecified reason. To give the series a "harder-edged feel", several older characters were introduced. Reflecting the growing independence of the aging characters, Degrassi High began to give more focus to the characters' lives outside of school, with scenes taking place at nighttime, on the street, or at the characters' jobs. In contrast to Degrassi Junior High, in which the extras were still made known to the viewers, the newer series would include a team of "extra extras", who would simply appear for no other purpose than to fill the background. Degrassi High notably tackled HIV/AIDS, with the character Dwayne Myers (Darrin Brown), and suicide with the character Claude Tanner (David Armin-Parcells).

Despite continued success and demand from CBC, WGBH was finding it increasingly difficult to fund the show from the children's department of PBS, and were forced to back out. Combined with creative exhaustion, it was decided to end Degrassi High after its second season, and filming wrapped in October 1990. In November 1990, Schuyler explained to the Canadian Press that they wanted to end the series "while we were still feeling good about what we were doing." In addition, she noted that most of the cast were occupied with post-secondary education, and that she felt the show had already tackled what they had aimed to. Schuyler informed Ivan Fecan, then the programming chief of CBC and long-time supporter of Degrassi, of their decision to end the series and suggested a feature-length finale as a compromise, which Fecan enthusiastically accepted and offered funding for.

=== 1991–1998: Degrassi Talks, School's Out, and hiatus ===
The Degrassi logo used between 1989 and 1992.

During development of the television movie in early 1991, six Degrassi actors – Amanda Stepto, Pat Mastroianni, Stacie Mistysyn, Rebecca Haines, Siluck Saysanasy, and Neil Hope – travelled around Canada to interview teenagers about various health and social issues for the six-part documentary series Degrassi Talks, which aired on CBC in six installments from February 29 to March 30, 1992, each tackling a specific issue that the series had portrayed. Each actor was chosen specifically for their character's relation to each topic. The series was personally funded by then-Minister of Health Benoît Bouchard, who contributed $350,000. The six actors conducted interviews in 26 cities, including bigger and smaller towns. The series also featured archive footage from the series, vox pop interviews and on-screen statistics. While it was well received by critics, it proved less popular with teenage viewers, who felt it to be redundant and at times perpetuating certain stereotypes.

Principal photography began on School's Out, the television movie, on July 21, 1991, and it premiered on CBC on January 5, 1992. The movie, which mostly focused on a love triangle between Joey, Caitlin (Mistysyn), and Tessa Campanelli (Kirsten Bourne), garnered a positive, yet mixed reception. It garnered controversy for its unusual characterization of certain popular characters as well as the catastrophic events experienced by other characters. It was also notable for its use of the word "fuck", first said by Stefan Brogren and then Stacie Mistysyn, that are claimed to be the first uses of the word in Canadian television history. Despite the mixed reception, the film drew an estimated 2.3 million viewers: double that of the average audience that Degrassi High received. The movie did not air in the United States until over two years later, when it premiered on PBS on June 20, 1994.

Linda Schuyler and Kit Hood dissolved their partnership in the early 1990s but continued to own Playing With Time. In July 1998, Hood revealed the company was "virtually dormant." He continued to rent the company's former offices as a battered women's shelter, before retiring to Nova Scotia for the remainder of his life. In 1992, Schuyler and Stephen Stohn founded Epitome Pictures, the company which would produce all future Degrassi series. In 1994, Epitome Pictures produced the television movie X-Rated, which centred on a group of young adults living in an apartment complex; the movie starred Stacie Mistysyn. X-Rated was the pilot for the series Liberty Street, which starred Pat Mastroianni and aired on the CBC for two seasons in 1995. In 1997, Epitome Pictures produced the soap opera Riverdale; its set, located on 220 Bartley Drive in Toronto, was re-used as the set for Degrassi: The Next Generation.

=== 1999–2019: Degrassi: The Next Generation and Degrassi: Next Class ===
The Degrassi logo used between 2001 and 2010.

In 1999, a televised reunion of the Degrassi Junior High cast took place on the CBC youth show Jonovision, hosted by Jonathan Torrens. The reunion became particularly popular, with the live taping drawing in audience members from as far as San Francisco. The success of the reunion inspired Yan Moore and Linda Schuyler, now running Epitome Pictures, to develop an interest in creating a new Degrassi series by December 1999. They had originally planned to create an unrelated teen drama titled Ready, Willing And Wired. Moore noted that Emma, Spike's daughter, would be entering junior high school by the new millennium, and the show was retooled to centre around Emma and her friends attending Degrassi. Epitome would propose the idea of Degrassi: The Next Generation to CTV in October 2000, and Ivan Fecan, now CEO of CTV's parent company, ordered thirteen episodes of the new show. Filming began on July 3, 2001, and the show premiered on CTV on October 14, 2001.

Although the original Degrassi series were widely popular in Canada, The Next Generation was particularly successful in the United States. During the show's ninth season, the producers were informed in a meeting with CTV executives that the network did not plan to renew the show. At the same time, Stephen Stohn was in talks with TeenNick to produce 48 episodes of a telenovela-style teen show, which he later pitched as the tenth season of Degrassi: The Next Generation. To promote the series on the new network, TeenNick commissioned a promotional music video, set to "Shark in the Water" by V V Brown and themed around a carnival and circus, which contained clues foreshadowing later events of the season. The promo was extremely successful. According to Stephen Stohn, MuchMusic, the network that the series moved to from CTV in Canada, cited the promo as having improved the network's ratings significantly. Season 10 premiered on July 19, 2010, and marked a change in production style to a telenovela/soap opera format, and for the first time, episodes airing in Canada and the United States on the same day. "The Next Generation" was also dropped from the title, which became simply Degrassi.

Degrassi was cancelled after fourteen seasons, and a spin off series called Degrassi: Next Class aired on Netflix for four seasons from 2016 to 2017. Season one was released on Netflix January 15, 2016, and started airing January 4, 2016, on Family's new teen programming block, F2N. Fourteen cast members from season 14 of Degrassi also reprised their roles. On March 7, 2019, Stefan Brogren alluded to the show's cancellation in a tweet. Sara Waisglass, who played Frankie Hollingsworth, recalled to the Toronto Star in 2022 that she was disappointed at the cancellation and recalled: "They never told us anything. We had our contracts and the way it worked was they had to tell you by a certain date if we were picked up or not. We just never heard from them again."

On January 20, 2020, Degrassi co-creator Kit Hood died of a brain aneurysm at his home in Nova Scotia, aged 76.

=== 2022–present: Planned second revival and documentary series ===
On January 13, 2022, it was announced that HBO Max gave a series order to Degrassi, a new series in the franchise consisting of 10 hour-long episodes set to premiere in 2023. It was announced that the new series would be helmed by Lara Azzopardi and Julia Cohen, who previously wrote the Degrassi: The Next Generation episode "Heat of The Moment." Linda Schuyler, franchise co-creator, and Stephen Stohn, creative partner on The Next Generation, issued a joint statement confirming that they would not be involved in the new series, stating that the "time is perfect to pass the baton" to Azzopardi and Cohen. On February 23, 2022, casting commenced for the series with a search for 13- to 20-year-old youth of all backgrounds. Filming was scheduled to begin July 1, 2022, and end November 30, 2022, However, in August 2022, reports surfaced of the restructuring of HBO Max, which led to fears of the reboot's potential cancellation.

In November 2022, The Wall Street Journal reported that the new Degrassi series would not be moving forward amid the Warner Bros. merger. However, multiple statements from Schuyler and WildBrain have indicated that there are still plans to produce the series; on the day of the cancellation's announcement, WildBrain stated they were "committed to the future of Degrassi" and that "discussions concerning the contract with WarnerMedia are ongoing." In April 2023, Schuyler told the Toronto Star that WildBrain considered the failed HBO deal a "false start." Schuyler maintained her optimism in an August 2023 podcast interview, but revealed that the 2023 SAG-AFTRA strike had been impacting plans to go forward.

On December 6, 2023, WildBrain announced a three-part documentary series about the franchise, produced in co-operation with Peacock Alley. The series is set to examine the franchise's 40-year history in depth and features new cast interviews and behind-the-scenes footage. In July 2025, its title was announced as Degrassi: Whatever It Takes, with the documentary set to premiere at the 2025 Toronto International Film Festival.

== Franchise overview ==
=== Main television series ===
No.	Title	Original airdates	Networks
1	"The Kids of Degrassi Street"	September 12, 1979 – January 5, 1986	CBC (Canada)
Follows the lives of children living on De Grassi Street in Toronto.
2	"Degrassi Junior High"	January 18, 1987 – February 27, 1989	CBC (Canada), PBS (United States)
Follows an ensemble cast of students attending the titular fictional school as they navigate their lives and face a wide range of issues, ranging from mundane to serious.
3	"Degrassi High"	November 6, 1989 – January 28, 1991	CBC (Canada), PBS (United States)
A continuation of Degrassi Junior High, following the same cast as they move into high school. It tackles more mature and serious issues such as abortion, AIDS, and suicide.
4	"Degrassi: The Next Generation"	October 14, 2001 – August 2, 2015	CTV, MuchMusic, MTV Canada (Canada), The N, TeenNick (United States)
A revival of Degrassi Junior High and Degrassi High, centred on a new generation of students attending Degrassi Community School. Characters from the previous series return as adults. Renamed Degrassi from seasons 10 to 14.
5	"Degrassi: Next Class"	January 15, 2016 – July 7, 2017	Netflix (international), Family Channel (Canada)
Follows the remaining underclassmen from Degrassi: The Next Generation as well as a new set of students. Final franchise entry to date.

=== Television movies ===
No.	Title	Original Air Date (Canada)	Original Air Date (US)	Network
1	"School's Out!"	January 5, 1992	June 20, 1994	CBC (Canada), PBS (United States)
Set post-graduation, Joey Jeremiah (Pat Mastroianni) cheats on Caitlin Ryan (Stacie Mistysyn) with Tessa Campanelli (Kirsten Bourne); Snake (Stefan Brogren) can't get a girlfriend. Wheels (Neil Hope) is imprisoned when he drunk drives and kills a child. Meanwhile, Alexa (Irene Courakos) and Simon (Michael Carry) prepare to marry.
2	"Degrassi Goes Hollywood"	August 31, 2009	August 14, 2009	The N (United States), CTV (Canada)
The cast of Degrassi: The Next Generation goes to Hollywood. Paige Michalchuk (Lauren Collins) lands a role in a film directed by Jason Mewes. The relationship between Ellie Nash (Stacey Farber) and Craig Manning (Jake Epstein) intensifies, and Stüdz, a band led by Peter Stone (Jamie Johnston), seem poised for their big break. NOTE: Aired in syndication as a four-part episode titled "Paradise City".
3	"Degrassi Takes Manhattan"	July 16, 2010	July 19, 2010	MuchMusic (Canada), TeenNick (United States)
A group of Degrassi students go to New York. Jane Vaughn (Paula Brancati) is invited there to front a rock band for a TV performance, Spinner Mason (Shane Kippel) and Emma Nelson (Miriam McDonald) decide to marry in a spur of the moment situation. NOTE: Aired in syndication as a four-part episode titled "The Rest Of My Life".

=== Documentaries and specials ===
No.	Title	Original Air Date	Networks
1	"Degrassi Between Takes"	October 30, 1989	CBC (Canada)
Narrated by Canadian journalist Peter Gzowski, Degrassi Between Takes documents the creative process and impact of Degrassi Junior High, The documentary features footage of the acting workshops, as well as clips from a radio interview with Amanda Stepto, and the 1988 Gemini Awards ceremony in which the show won four awards.
2	"Degrassi Talks"	February 29 – March 30, 1992	CBC (Canada)
A non-fiction documentary series that aired for six episodes on the CBC following School's Out. Six of the best known actors from the series – Rebecca Haines, Neil Hope, Pat Mastroianni, Stacie Mistysyn, Siluck Saysanasy, and Amanda Stepto – travelled across Canada to interview teens and young adults about the issues dealt with in the show.
3	"The Degrassi Story"	September 17, 2005	CTV (Canada)
A documentary created to celebrate the 25th anniversary of the Degrassi franchise, hosted by Stefan Brogren, who played Snake. Brogren tracks down and interviews various Degrassi actors and crew, including Neil Hope (Wheels) in his final public appearance before his death in November 2007.
4	"It Goes There: Degrassi's Most Talked About Moments"	July 31, 2015	TeenNick (United States)
The cast of Degrassi: The Next Generation discuss their favorite character moments and the show's most controversial moments.
5	"Degrassi: Whatever It Takes"	September 13, 2025	2025 Toronto International Film Festival (Canada)
Actors from across the franchise discuss the show's success and impact over the decades.

=== Books and other print media ===
During The Kids of Degrassi Street's run, a series of eight books based on episodes from the series were published by James Lorimer & Co. The books were written by Linda Schuyler and Kit Hood, with help from Eve Jennings. Two of the books, Casey Draws The Line and Griff Gets A Hand, were later reprinted with an updated cover with a similar style to the Degrassi Junior High and Degrassi High books.

Between 1988 and 1992, James Lorimer & Co. published a series of eleven paperback books based on the characters of Degrassi Junior High and Degrassi High to accompany the two series. Each book focused on a different character, such as Spike, Joey, Caitlin, Wheels, and Snake, often expanding on their storylines or following new ones entirely. Another novel, Exit Stage Left, was an original story focused on multiple characters. One book, focused on the characters of Arthur Kobalewscuy and Yick Yu, was written, but not released.

To coincide with the debut of Degrassi Talks in February 1992, Boardwalk Books published companion books based on the six episodes. The books, which contain more content than the television series, feature an image the host of the episode, usually while holding camera equipment on the front cover, and a preface written by Degrassi writer Catherine Dunphy, profiling the actor who hosted the episode. The books also feature expanded versions of several interviews seen in the series, as well as other interviews that were not shown in the series due to time constraints. From 2006 to 2007, four graphic novels based on Degrassi: The Next Generation were released as part of the Extra Credit series, with the books centering on the characters Ellie Nash, Emma Nelson, Spinner Mason, and Marco Del Rossi respectively.

There were also several other non-fiction books based on the franchise, including The Official 411: Degrassi Generations, a behind-the-scenes history book written by Degrassi writer and publicist Kathryn Ellis released to celebrate the franchise's 25th anniversary in September 2005, and Growing Up Degrassi: Television, Identity and Youth Cultures, an anthology of scholarly essays on the franchise, edited by Michelle Byers. A memoir by Schuyler, titled The Mother Of All Degrassi, was released on November 15, 2022.

=== Planned Degrassi: The Next Generation film ===
During 2004 and 2005, a feature film adaptation of Degrassi: The Next Generation was in development. American filmmaker Kevin Smith, a longtime fan of the franchise, was slated to direct the movie. By September 2005, the film was awaiting a green light from Paramount Pictures, with a script written by Aaron Martin and Tassie Cameron, and was set to begin filming in May 2006. Smith told Playback that he had considered getting Ben Affleck to cameo in the movie, but decided against it. The project eventually came to be unrealized.

In 2022, Smith revealed to Screen Rant that the movie would have heavily centred on Drake's character Jimmy Brooks "getting up and walking." Smith claims that they incorporated elements from the script into a future episode of the television series.

== Critical reception and impact ==
=== Critical reception ===
The Degrassi franchise has been critically lauded for virtually its entire existence. The Canadian press was celebratory of Degrassi Junior High's local and international success, and believed it to be one of the most groundbreaking children's television series of all-time; in the lead-up to its American debut, Fred M. Hechinger of the New York Times pondered; "Can teen-agers be won over to entertainment that is not mindless, violent or sexually irresponsible?". In 1989 the series was profiled by John Fisher Burns, also of the New York Times, who asserted it was "remolding the pat-a-cake image of what the industry, with at least some sense of paradox, likes to call ''children's television.'' Its sequel, Degrassi High, garnered similar praise. In 1990, Lynne Heffley of the Los Angeles Times called Degrassi one of the "gutsiest shows on television." Kelli Pryor of Entertainment Weekly called it the "thirtysomething of the book-bag set."

While met with some skepticism, including from The Ottawa Citizen's Tony Atherton and The Seattle Times' Melanie McFarland, Degrassi: The Next Generation also went on to receive critical acclaim. Entertainment Weekly called it "a cult hit", and The New York Times named it "Tha Best Teen TV N da WRLD." AOL TV ranked it as the sixth TV's Biggest Guilty Pleasure.

=== Authenticity ===
Linda Schuyler explained to Entertainment Weekly in 2012 that "the show set out to be an authentic — and I use the word authentic very carefully; I don't use the word realistic –- an authentic portrayal of teenage years." Authenticity is regarded as a major tenet of Degrassi's identity, and is a frequent talking point in critical and fan discourse about the franchise. In their book Canadian Television Today, Bart Beaty and Rebecca Sullivan wrote how Degrassi touted itself as an "honest, unflinching look at growing up"; in the book Programming Reality: Perspectives On English-Canadian Television, Michele Byers wrote that the series is "often heralded as speaking to rather than for young people." Throughout the years, it has commonly been contrasted with similar teen shows produced in the United States that are perceived to value style over substance.

Filmmaker and Degrassi fan Kevin Smith wrote in TV Guide of watching Degrassi Junior High: "These were ordinary-looking ... kids like I had been in high school ... dealing with real problems—not that 90210 kinda TV problem-crap ... I could identify with these kids ... These non-glamorous, unpolished, awkward, age-appropriate-for-the-roles actors made me believe that I was a kindred spirit to the characters they played." Degrassi: The Next Generation, while being the most successful of the series and generally considered by many to share the same qualities, is frequently criticized for its higher production value and gradual shift towards soap opera-style sensationalism like that of other teen drama series.

Degrassi is also noted for its casting of real teenagers, as opposed to the common practice of casting much older actors: something often cited when discussing the franchise's authenticity. During development of Degrassi Junior High, Schuyler observed that "so much of the American stuff set in high schools is played by late teens and early 20s – and then some." She further elaborated to IndieWire in 2016: "I like to talk about the fact that you can take a 25-year-old who looks 15 and have them play a role, but that actor is bringing 10 more years of life experience to that role. By having our cast be age-appropriate, they bring the freshness and the authenticity of that age."

=== Censorship ===
The franchise has been the subject of numerous controversies and censorships since the 1980s. In the United Kingdom, several episodes of Degrassi Junior High's first season, including the International Emmy award-winning episode "It's Late", were not aired in its regular place on the children's timeslot at 5pm on BBC1 due to complaints from parents that their content "too strong for [young children]", and were instead shown at 6pm on the BBC2 teen block DEF II. The network did not air its second and third seasons.

The two-part premiere of Degrassi High, "A New Start", which centered around a character becoming pregnant and ultimately choosing to get an abortion, aired uncensored in Canada in November 1989, but was edited by PBS for its January 1990 American premiere to remove the episode's final scene depicting said character fighting through anti-abortion picketers outside of a clinic. This decision was met with backlash from the show's producers, with co-creator and director Kit Hood lambasting the network for giving the episode "an American ending, happy, safe but incomplete..." and requested his name be removed from the credits.

In 2004, Noggin's The N block decided to postpone an episode of Degrassi: The Next Generation revolving around abortion, titled "Accidents Will Happen." The two-part episode focused on a character who becomes pregnant and decides to have an abortion. The N's decision prompted backlash from fans. A subsequent petition from fans condemned the decision as "unjust and asinine", and argued that the episode did not espouse any forceful opinions about the subject, and that the fans had the right to watch the series in an uncensored, unaltered form. Conversely, CTV in Canada showed the episode twice.

=== Reception from LGBT groups ===
Degrassi's portrayal of LGBT youth was viewed by critics as groundbreaking. Linda Schuyler said that the impetus for the show's inclusion of LGBT themes stemmed from her colleague Bruce Mackey, who was central to the early development in the franchise, and who hid his sexuality from his professional life. Schuyler said: "It made me so sad to see somebody who had to live duplicitously like that, that it kind of has been right from the very beginning of this show, it's been a very important mandate for me."

The tenth season of Degrassi: The Next Generation introduced the female-to-male transgender character Adam Torres, played by Jordan Todosey, who by 2011 was the "only transgender regular or recurring character on scripted television" according to GLAAD. A central episode involving Adam's struggles with dysphoria, "My Body Is a Cage", won a Peabody Award that year.

== Legacy and honours ==
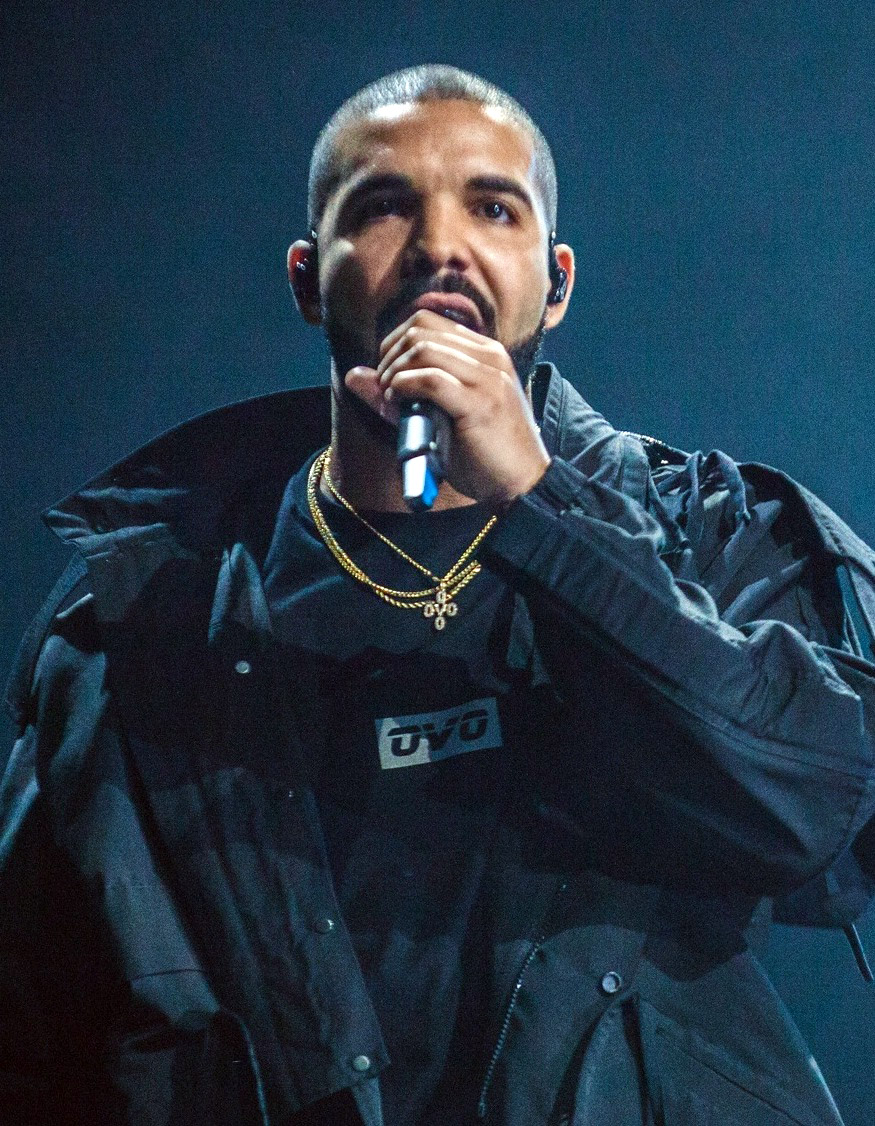
Drake, pictured in 2016, launched his career starring on Degrassi: The Next Generation.

Degrassi has been cited as the potential starting point for the modern television teen drama, and it is said to have influenced shows including Beverly Hills, 90210 and Dawson's Creek. Allegedly, American television producer Aaron Spelling unsuccessfully sought to adapt Degrassi for the American market before producing Beverly Hills, 90210, a story Linda Schuyler and Kit Hood have both denied. The franchise has won numerous Gemini Awards, several Teen Choice Awards and Young Artist Awards, two International Emmys, and a Peabody Award, among other awards and nominations.

Degrassi: The Next Generation became notable for featuring several actors who went on to achieve wider recognition and stardom since their time on the series, most notably actor-turned-rapper Drake, who played Jimmy Brooks, a basketball star who became physically disabled after he was shot by a classmate. When asked about his early acting career, Drake replied, "My mother was very sick. We were very poor, like broke. The only money I had coming in was [from] Canadian TV." Nina Dobrev, who portrayed Mia Jones in later seasons, went on to star as the lead character of the popular supernatural teen drama television series The Vampire Diaries. The music video to Drake's song "I'm Upset" (2018) features a reunion of the Degrassi: The Next Generation cast.

In 2012, the Degrassi franchise surpassed The Beachcombers as the longest-running Canadian drama by episode count.

=== Honours ===
After the death of co-creator Kit Hood in January 2020, a bench with a memorial plaque was installed in various locations important to the original Degrassi series, including Vincent Massey Junior School (the location of Degrassi Junior High) and the Centennial College Story Arts Centre (the location of Degrassi High). In 2021, Hood's daughter Georgia started an online petition to have the laneway behind the former Playing With Time production office named after him.

In December 2023, the franchise was inducted into Canada's Walk of Fame.

== Home media and streaming ==
=== Physical releases ===
Each Degrassi series has seen home media release over the years. Initially available by mail-order for educational institutions, Degrassi Junior High and Degrassi High were given a commercial home video release by WGBH in 2000. Junior High was released on DVD in North America and Australia in 2005, while Degrassi High was released on DVD in North America and Australia in 2007 and 2008 respectively. Each season of Degrassi: The Next Generation was released on DVD by Alliance Atlantis each year throughout the 2000s in big box sets that contained a variety of bonus content, including audition tapes, deleted scenes, and bloopers. These annual DVD releases stopped after season twelve of The Next Generation.

=== Streaming ===
Degrassi Junior High, Degrassi High, and Degrassi: The Next Generation have variously been available to stream online over the years, including on Canada Media Fund's Encore+ and the official Degrassi YouTube channel. It was announced in June 2023 that each series, including Kids of Degrassi Street and Degrassi Talks and bar Next Class would be made available on Amazon Prime Canada in July.

== Sources ==
- Byers, Michelle (December 30, 2007). "Degrassi". In Mitchell, Claudia; Reid-Walsh, Jacqueline (eds.). Girl Culture: An Encyclopedia. ABC-CLIO. pp. 261–262. ISBN 9780313084447.
- Ellis, Kathryn (2005). The official 411 Degrassi generations. Fenn Pub. Co. ISBN 1-55168-278-8. OCLC 59136593.
- Laine Zisman Newman, ed. (2020). Women and popular culture in Canada. Toronto. pp. 104–108. ISBN 978-0-88961-615-8. OCLC 1140640717.
- Polger, Mark Aaron (2005). Byers, Michelle (ed.). "Degrassi.ca: Building a Fan Community Online". Growing up Degrassi: Television, Identity and Youth Cultures: 259–271. Archived from the original on April 28, 2021.
- Schuyler, Linda (2022). The mother of all Degrassi : a memoir. Toronto. ISBN 978-1-77041-683-3. OCLC 1309065167.
- Sex. Toronto: Boardwalk Books. 1992. ISBN 1-895681-01-4. OCLC 25370148.
- Stohn, Stephen (2018). Whatever it takes : life lessons from Degrassi and elsewhere in the world of music and television. Christopher Ward. Toronto: Dundurn. ISBN 978-1-4597-4000-6. OCLC 1022792148.
- Where We Are on TV: 2012–2013 (PDF) (Report). GLAAD. 2012. Archived from the original (PDF) on March 26, 2020.
