= Jonovision =

- Jonovision Logo
- Starring: Jonathan Torrens
- Country of origin: Canada
- Original language: English
- No. of seasons: 5
- No. of episodes: 225

Production
- Production locations: Canadian Broadcasting Centre; Toronto, Ontario
- Running time: 25 minutes

Original release
- Network: CBC
- Release: 1996 – 2001

Jonovision is a Canadian television talk show aimed toward teenagers. The show aired for five seasons, from 1996 to 2001, on CBC Television. Jonovision was nominated for 7 Gemini Awards. It reached the top of its popularity at the beginning of its fourth season, when it hosted a Degrassi reunion. The host was Jonathan Torrens, who had previous been one of the hosts of Street Cents, and who went on to host and act in more television programs, including playing J-Roc in Trailer Park Boys.

== Popularity and Impact ==
The show reached the peak of its popularity in its fourth season when it hosted a reunion of the cast of Degrassi, a beloved Canadian teen drama. This reunion episode is credited with contributing to the revival of the Degrassi franchise, specifically Degrassi: The Next Generation.

== Notable Segments ==
Jonovision's segments ranged from serious topics, like high-school initiation practices, to lighthearted, such as sketches involving mock dramatizations using toys.

One recurring segment was Jonopalooza, an indie music showcase that featured early television appearances by bands such as Sum 41 and By Divine Right, with some members of the latter going on to form Broken Social Scene soon after.

A young Ryan Gosling was featured in a sketch on the show in which he played a character who was addicted to watching beauty pageants.

== Reception ==
John Allemang of The Globe and Mail praised Jonovision for addressing deep issues in a manner that resonated with teenagers, without talking down to them. Jeremy Barker of The Globe and Mail highlighted how Jonovision integrated internet interactions with its audience, showcasing early examples of blending traditional TV with digital engagement. According to Louise Leger of The Globe and Mail, Jonovision was part of a broader trend where children's programming began to receive more attention and respect in the television industry.

== Awards and nominations ==
Jonovision was nominated for seven Gemini Awards during its run.
