= Linda Schuyler =

English-born Canadian television producer

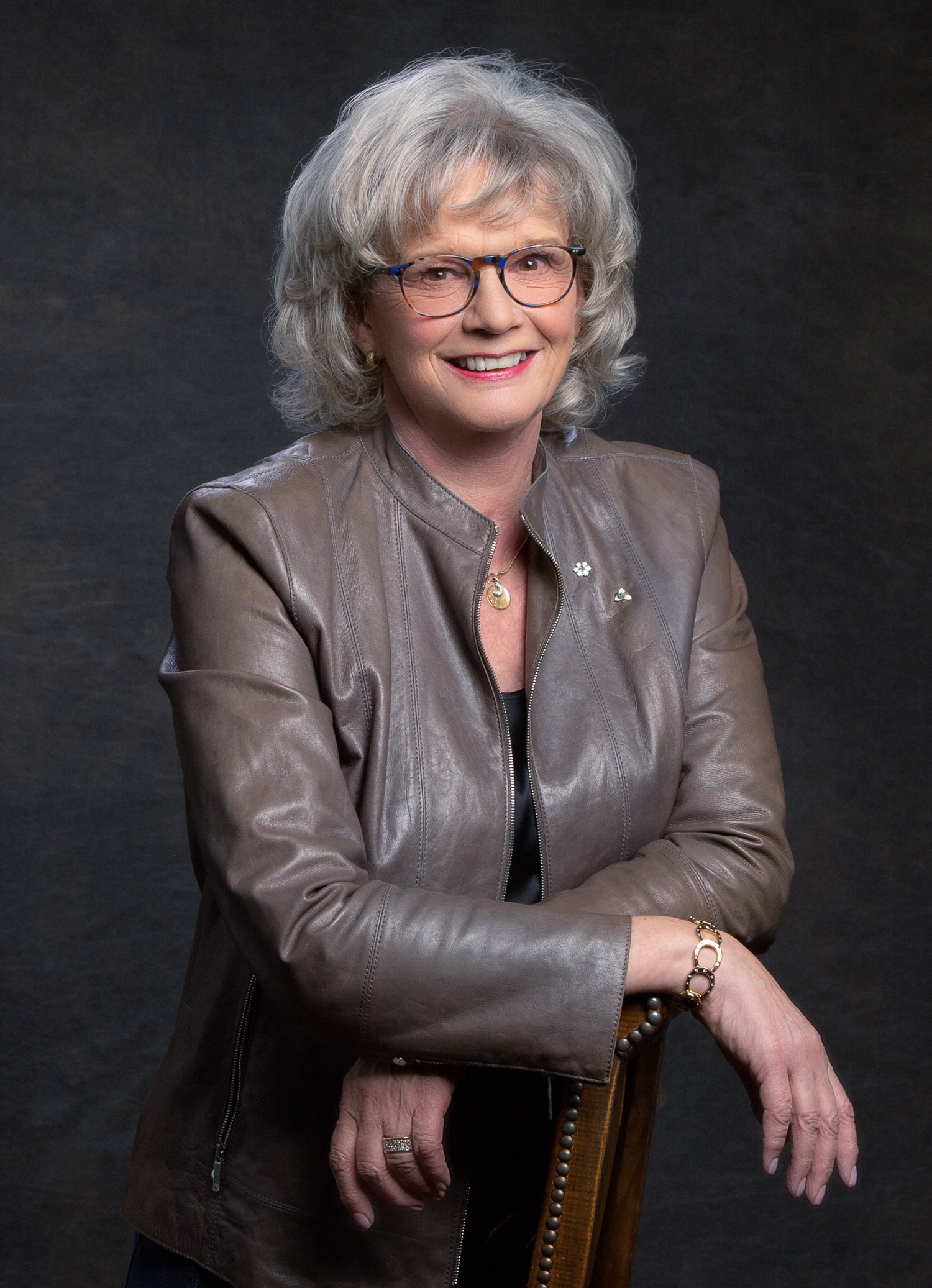
- Schuyler in 2022
- Born: Linda Bawcutt; February 12, 1948 (age 78); London, England
- Education: University of Toronto (BA)
- Occupation: Television producer
- Spouse: Stephen Stohn (m. 1995)
- Children: 1

Linda Schuyler CM OOnt (/ˈskaɪlər/; née Bawcutt; born February 12, 1948) is a Canadian television producer. She is best known for being the co-creator and producer of the Degrassi franchise, which has spanned five series over four decades. She is a co-founder of Playing With Time, Inc. (with Kit Hood), and Epitome Pictures (with Stephen Stohn), the production companies involved with the franchise over its 40-year-long history respectively.

Born in London, Schuyler immigrated to Canada with her family in the 1950s. As a schoolteacher, she began creating short films and formed a creative partnership with television commercial editor Kit Hood. In 1979, Schuyler purchased the rights to adapt the Kay Chorao book Ida Makes a Movie into a film, of which ultimately became the genesis of Degrassi. Schuyler also created Instant Star, another commercially successful Epitome production.

Schuyler has received multiple awards and accolades for her work. In 1994, she was made a Member of the Order of Canada, and in 2012, she was made a Member of the Order of Ontario.

== Early life ==
Schuyler was born in London to Jack and Joyce Bawcutt, Schuyler immigrated with her family to Canada in 1957 and was raised in Paris, Ontario. Her father, a Royal Air Force pilot during World War II, had been stationed in Canada during the war and grew to like the country. She attended Paris District High School.

Schuyler won a math scholarship to the University of Waterloo in 1967, but dropped out months later. She decided to travel the world solo shortly after; while back in England, Schuyler was in a car that collided with a double-decker bus, killing the other two occupants of the car and severely injuring Schuyler, who was rendered permanently infertile. When she returned to Canada, she began attending a teacher's college in London, Ontario.

== Career ==
After earning her Bachelor of Arts degree from the University of Toronto in 1974, where she studied film courses, Schuyler became a school teacher and taught for four years at Earl Grey Senior Public School in Toronto's east end. As a teacher, Schuyler began creating short films, which eventually became the inspiration for Degrassi. Schuyler's first film was a documentary named Between Two Worlds. She first attracted media attention when the NBC in the United States aired clips of Between Two Worlds out of context to support a news story about race relations in Toronto.

In 1976, Schuyler met Kit Hood, an editor of television commercials, when she needed help from an experienced editor to save the "muddled footage" of one of her projects. Hood and Schuyler found a balance; editor Hood was inexperienced in writing, and writer/producer Schuyler was inexperienced in editing, leading to their creative partnership and the formation of Playing With Time, Inc.

In 1979, Schuyler received a copy of the book Ida Makes a Movie, written by Kay Chorao, as material for a class about filmmaking. Although the book turned out to be children's fiction about a cat, Schuyler became interested in adapting the book into a movie, and planned to fly to New York to meet Chorao. Before leaving, Schuyler sought legal advice from Stephen Stohn, a lawyer who would eventually become her producing partner and husband. Stohn advised her to forego a lawyer and instead propose the deal herself.

Schuyler purchased the rights to the film for $200, and repurposed the film to be about a girl who enters a movie about the garbage in her neighborhood into a National Film Board-sponsored competition and wins, despite the film being misinterpreted as an anti-war piece. The resulting short film, Ida Makes a Movie, became the genesis for the anthology series The Kids of Degrassi Street, which became the first series in the Degrassi franchise.

In the early 1990s, Schuyler and Hood separated and Schuyler founded Epitome Pictures, a subsidiary of DHX Media, which produced Degrassi: The Next Generation, the franchise's most well-known series, and its direct sequel Degrassi: Next Class, which was released on Netflix. From 2004 to 2008 Schuyler executive produced the teen drama television series Instant Star about a young woman, played by Alexz Johnson, who wins a singer/songwriter contest.

In 2011 and 2012 she executive produced, alongside her husband, Stephen Stohn, the television series The L.A. Complex (working title: Highland Gardens) for Bell Media in Canada and The CW in the United States, about young Canadians dreaming of fame and fortune while struggling to survive in an apartment-style hotel in Los Angeles.

In July 2021, it was announced that ECW Press purchased the rights to Degrassi Matriarch, an autobiography/memoir that is said to "chronicle Schuyler's nearly four-decade adventure producing the Degrassi television shows". The memoir, The Mother Of All Degrassi, was released on November 15, 2022.

== Personal life ==
In 1995, she married her producing partner Stephen Stohn. He has a child, Max from a previous marriage.

== Awards ==
In 1994, she was made a Member of the Order of Canada.

In 2010, she received the Academy Achievement Award, at a Gemini Award ceremony. In 2011, Schuyler was presented the Bonham Centre Award from The Mark S. Bonham Centre for Sexual Diversity Studies, University of Toronto, for her contributions to the advancement and education of issues around sexual identification.

In 2012, she was made a member of the Order of Ontario.

== Bibliography ==
- Schuyler, Linda (2022). The mother of all Degrassi : a memoir. Toronto. ISBN 978-1-77041-683-3. OCLC 1309065167.
