= Kay Chorao =

American writer

- Born: Ann McKay Sproat; January 7, 1936 (age 90); Elkhart, Indiana, USA
- Occupations: Artist, illustrator and writer
- Writing career
- Period: 1972–present
- Genre: Children's books

Kay Chorao, born as Ann McKay Sproat on January 7, 1936, (some sources say 1937) in Elkhart, Indiana, is an American artist, illustrator and writer of children's books.

== Biography ==
Chorao was born in Elkhart, Indiana, into a middle-class, suburban family. She loved and was encouraged to draw at a young age. She attended Laurel School in Shaker Heights, OH. Chorao went to Wheaton College, where in 1958 she earned a Bachelor of Arts in art history. After that, Chorao pursued her graduate study at Chelsea School of Art from 1958 to 1959.

Chorao got married and had three sons before moving to Brooklyn, New York with her family. From 1966 to 1968, she studied book illustration at School of Visual Arts in New York.

== Career ==
Besides writing self-illustrated children's books, Chorao has been the illustrator for many books by Jane Yolen, Judith Viorst, Jan Wahl, and Marjorie Sharmat. Chorao published her first book, The Repair of Uncle Toe, in 1972. Since then, she has written and illustrated more than fifty books. Her illustrations have been exhibited several times by American Institute of Graphic Arts and Society of Illustrators. Chorao has received the Christopher Award twice; the first time in 1979 as the illustrator of Chester Chipmunk's Thanksgiving, by Barbara Williams; and the second time in 1989 as the illustrator of The Good-Bye Book, by Judith Viorst.

In 1975, Chorao illustrated Albert's Toothache, by Barbara Williams. The book was critically successful, being given the American Library Association's notable book citation and Children's Book Showcase title. In 1979, her 1974 book Ida Makes a Movie was adapted into a short film by the same name, which would become the genesis for the highly successful Degrassi teen drama franchise. In 1988, Chorao published Cathedral Mouse, which was well received by critics and featured among the ten best children's picture books of the year, by New York Times.

In 1990, Chorao's book Baby's Lap Book was selected by American Library Association among the list of "Books to Grow On" for children from 6 to 12 months. The following year, she published Here Comes Kate, which was named among the Pick of the decade 1995–2005 "Best books for children" list compiled by New Jersey State Library, Clifton Public Library and Woodbridge Public Library. In 1994, Chorao self-illustrated book Annie and Cousin Precious was picked by International Reading Association as one of the Children's Choices for 1995.

== Selected works ==
=== As writer and illustrator ===
- The Repair of Uncle Toe (1972)
- A Magic Eye for Ida (1973)
- Ralph and the Queen's Bathtub (1974)
- Ida Makes a Movie (1974)
- Maudie's Umbrella (1975)
- Here Comes Kate (1982, 2000)
- Cathedral Mouse (1988)
- Ida and Betty and the Secret Eggs (1991)
- Annie and Cousin Precious (1994)
- Jumpety-Bumpety Hop: A Parade of Animal Poems (1997)
- Little Farm by the Sea (1998)

==== "Baby" series ====
- The Baby's Lap Book: Nursery Rhymes (1977, re-released with color illustrations in 1990)
- The Baby's Bedtime Book: Poems and Rhymes (1984)
- The Baby's Good Morning Book: Poems and Rhymes (1986)
- The Baby's Christmas Treasury: Poems, Stories, and Songs (1991)

==== Oink and Pearl series ====
1. Oink and Pearl (1981)
2. Ups and Downs with Oink and Pearl (1986)

=== As Illustrator only ===
- The Witch's Egg by Madeleine Edmondson (1974)
- Clyde Monster by Robert L. Crowe (1976)
- Whose House? by Barbara Seuling (2004)
- Grandma's Hurrying Child by Jane Yolen (2005)

==== Books by Majorie Weinman Sharmat ====
Books by Marjorie W. Sharmat that are illustrated by Kay Chorao:

- I'm Terrific (1977)
- Thornton the Worrier (1978)
- Grumley the Grouch (1980)
- Sometimes Mama and Papa Fight (1980)

==== Book by Judith Viorst ====
Books by Judith Viorst that are illustrated by Kay Chorao:

- My Mama Says there Aren't any Zombies, Ghosts, Vampires, Creatures, Demons, Monsters, Fiends, Goblins, or Things (1973)
- The Good-bye Book (1988)

==== Books by Jan Wahl ====
Books by Jan Wahl that are illustrated by Kay Chorao:

- Frankenstein's Dog (1977)
- Dracula's Cat (1978)

==== Books by Barbara Williams ====
Books by Barbara Williams that are illustrated by Kay Chorao:

- Albert's Toothache (1974)
- Kevin's Grandma (1975)
- Someday, Said Mitchell (1976) ISBN 0-525-39580-6 HB
- Chester Chipmunk's Thanksgiving (1978)
- A Valentine for Cousin Archie (1981)
