= Chelsea Inn =

Chelsea Inn may refer to:

- Chelsea Hotel, Toronto, a hotel in Toronto, Canada, once known as Delta's Chelsea Inn
- The Chelsea Inn, a historic hotel and pub in Atlantic City, New Jersey.
