= Walkway =

Engineered surface or structure supporting pedestrian traffic

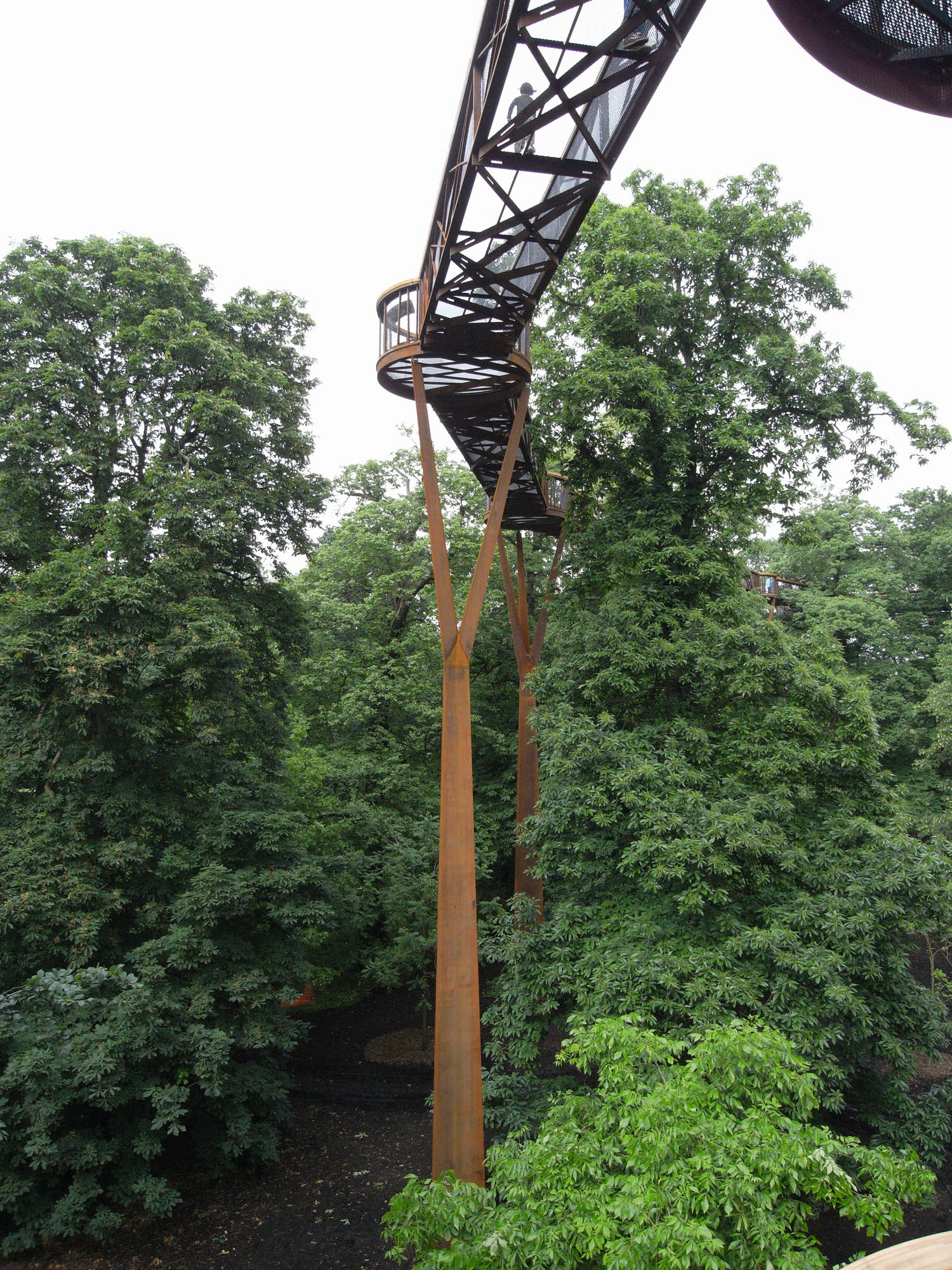
A canopy walkway at Royal Botanic Gardens, Kew, London, England.

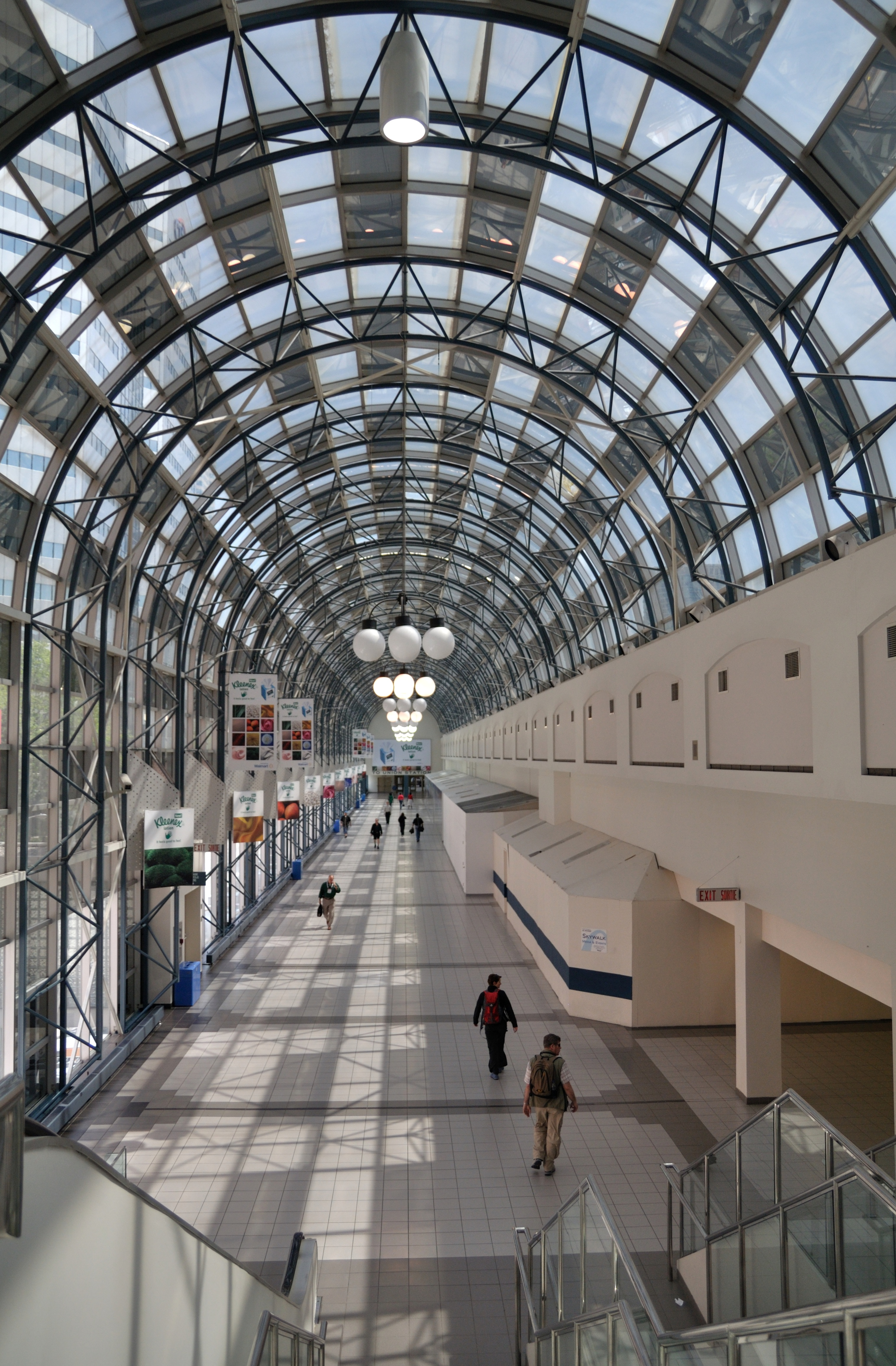
The SkyWalk main arcade facing east towards Union Station, Toronto, Ontario, Canada

In American English, walkway is a composite or umbrella term for all engineered surfaces or structures which support the use of trails.

The New Oxford American Dictionary also defines a walkway as "a passage or path for walking along, esp. a raised passageway connecting different sections of a building or a wide path in a park or garden." The word is used to describe a footpath in New Zealand, where "walkways vary enormously in nature, from short urban strolls, to moderate coastal locations, to challenging tramps [hikes] in the high country [mountains]". Similarly in St. John's, Newfoundland, Canada, the "Grand Concourse" is an integrated walkway system that has over 160 kilometers (99 mi) of walkways, which link every major park, river, pond, and green space in six municipalities.

In Toronto, Ontario, Canada, the SkyWalk is an approximately 500-metre (1,600 ft) enclosed and elevated walkway (skyway) connecting Union Station to the CN Tower and the Rogers Centre (SkyDome). It is part of the PATH network. The SkyWalk passes above the York Street 'subway' and the Simcoe Street Tunnel. It opened in 1989 and it was built to reduce the need for additional parking spaces near the Skydome stadium by providing a direct transportation link to the subway and GO trains. PATH is a 29-kilometre (18 mi) network of pedestrian tunnels beneath the office towers of Downtown Toronto, and the largest underground shopping complex in the world.

In British English, a walkway more specifically refers to a covered or raised passage in a building, typically connecting separate buildings.

== See also ==
- Canopy walkway, walkways built through forest canopies
- Floating dock
- Footbridge
- Footpath
- Oceanway
- Jubilee Walkway, London, England
- Moving sidewalk
- Pedway
- Processional walkway
- Promenade
- Sidewalk
- Skyway
