= SkyWalk =

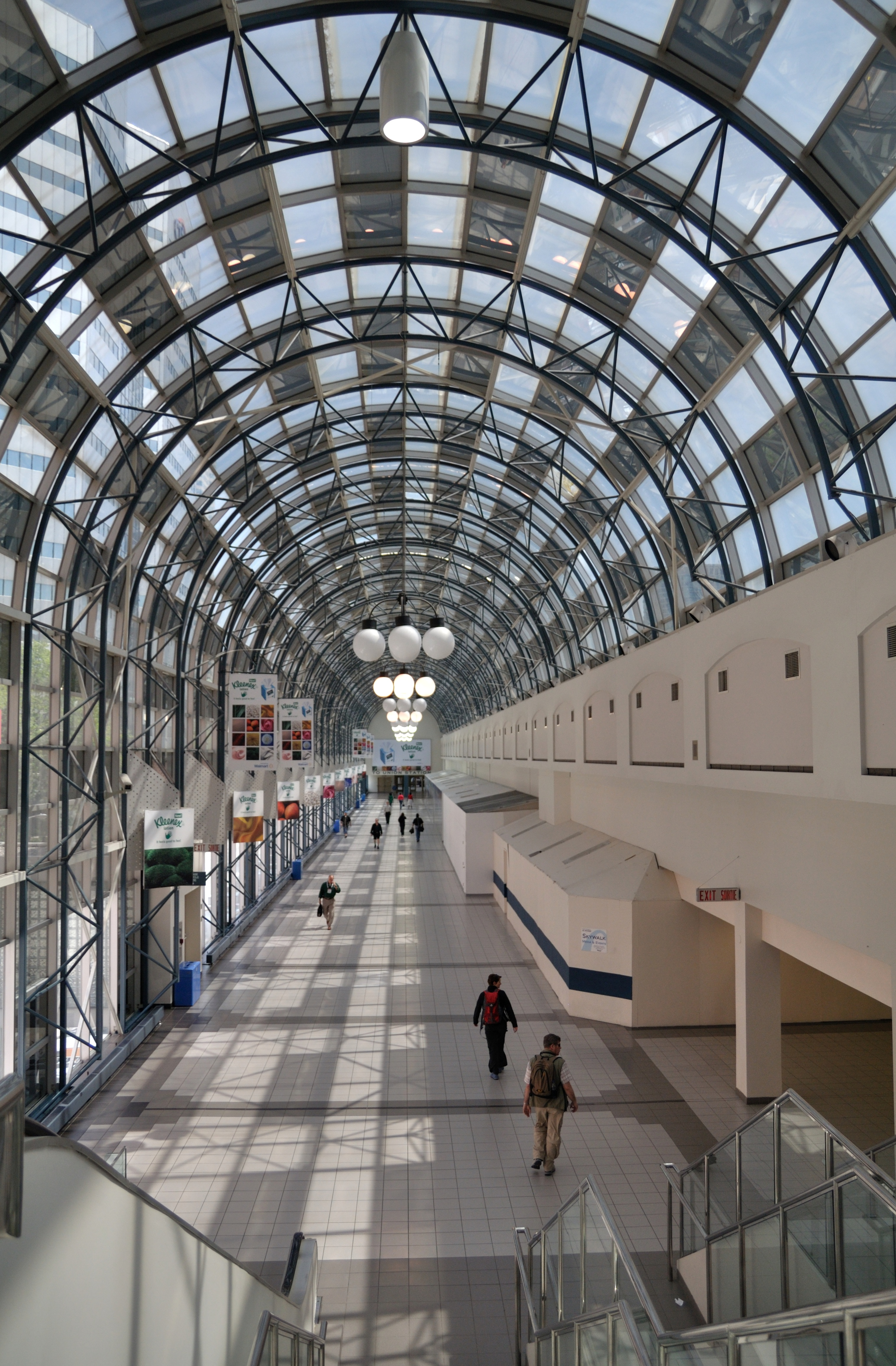
- The SkyWalk main arcade facing east towards Union Station in 2009, before construction began on the UP Express station.
- Coordinates: 43°38′39″N 79°23′4″W
- Carries: Pedestrians
- Locale: Toronto, Ontario, Canada
- Maintained by: PATH

Characteristics
- Design: Skyway
- Total length: approx. 160 metres

History
- Opened: 1989 (parts are from 1929 and 1931)

Location
- Interactive map of SkyWalk

The SkyWalk is an approximately 160 metre enclosed walkway connecting Union Station to the CN Tower and the Rogers Centre (SkyDome) in Toronto, Ontario, Canada. Part of Toronto's PATH network, the SkyWalk passes above the York Street 'subway' and the Simcoe Street Tunnel and runs roughly parallel between Front Street and Bremner Boulevard.

Designed by the IBI Group, the SkyWalk was opened in 1989 as a predominantly indoor connection from Union Station to the SkyDome. The primary purpose of the SkyWalk is to reduce the need for additional parking spaces near the stadium by providing a direct transportation link to the subway and GO Transit regional trains. A post-modern curved metal and glass structure, the SkyWalk was the first major construction project in the former Railway Lands after the CN Tower.

On 17 July 2014, the Toronto Preservation Board passed a motion recommending that Toronto City Council allow the demolition of the SkyWalk to make way for a 48-storey office and retail tower called Union Centre.

On 6 June 2015, the Union Pearson Express station was opened within the SkyWalk.

== Routing ==
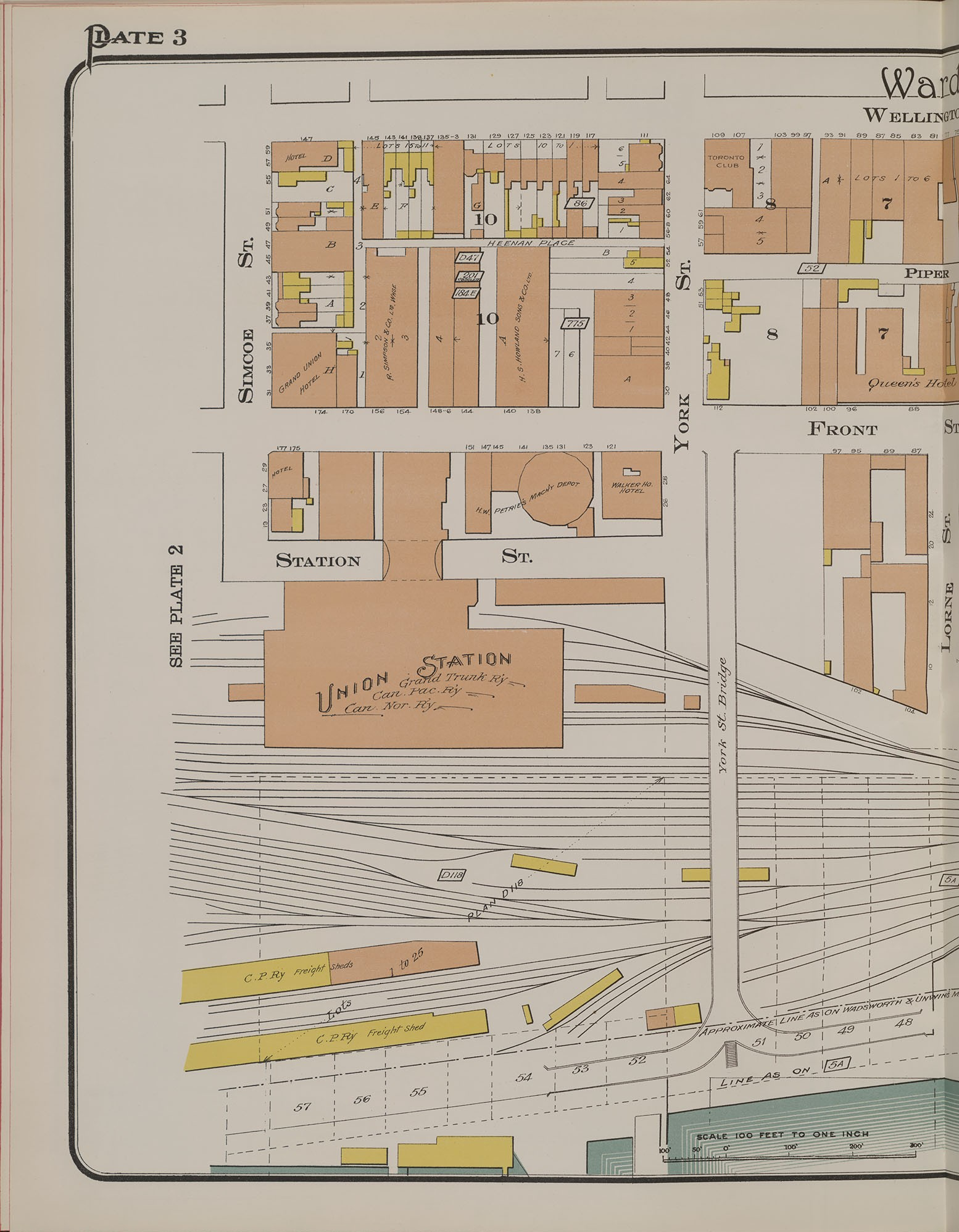
The location of the original Union Station where the SkyWalk is now

The SkyWalk begins at the western end of Union Station and first runs through the York Street Teamway, which runs above and parallel to York Street. It then passes through the second and third stories of the Canadian National Express Building, a heritage listed property completed in 1929, which acted as a terminus for horse-drawn carts delivering goods from Union Station.

The SkyWalk then assumes the form of a long arcade, running parallel to Station Street. Along the southern side of this corridor, the main section of SkyWalk, is the terminus station for the Union Pearson Express rail link to Pearson Airport, which opened in 2015. A GoodLife Fitness occupies the lower floors of the Canadian National Express building and extends beneath the arcade.

At the western end of the arcade, the SkyWalk rises onto an elevated walkway and crosses the rail tracks leading into Union Station and Lower Simcoe Street on a north–south, then northeast–southwest alignment, with a connection to another walkway leading to the Delta Toronto Hotel and Southcore Financial Centre. It becomes east–west adjacent to the upper level of the Metro Toronto Convention Centre, with a direct connection to the South Building and a bridge to the North Building.

The enclosed walkway terminates near the base of the CN Tower, behind the Ripley's Aquarium of Canada. From here, a short walk in open air leads to the Rogers Centre and across Bremner Boulevard to Roundhouse Park.

== Connections ==
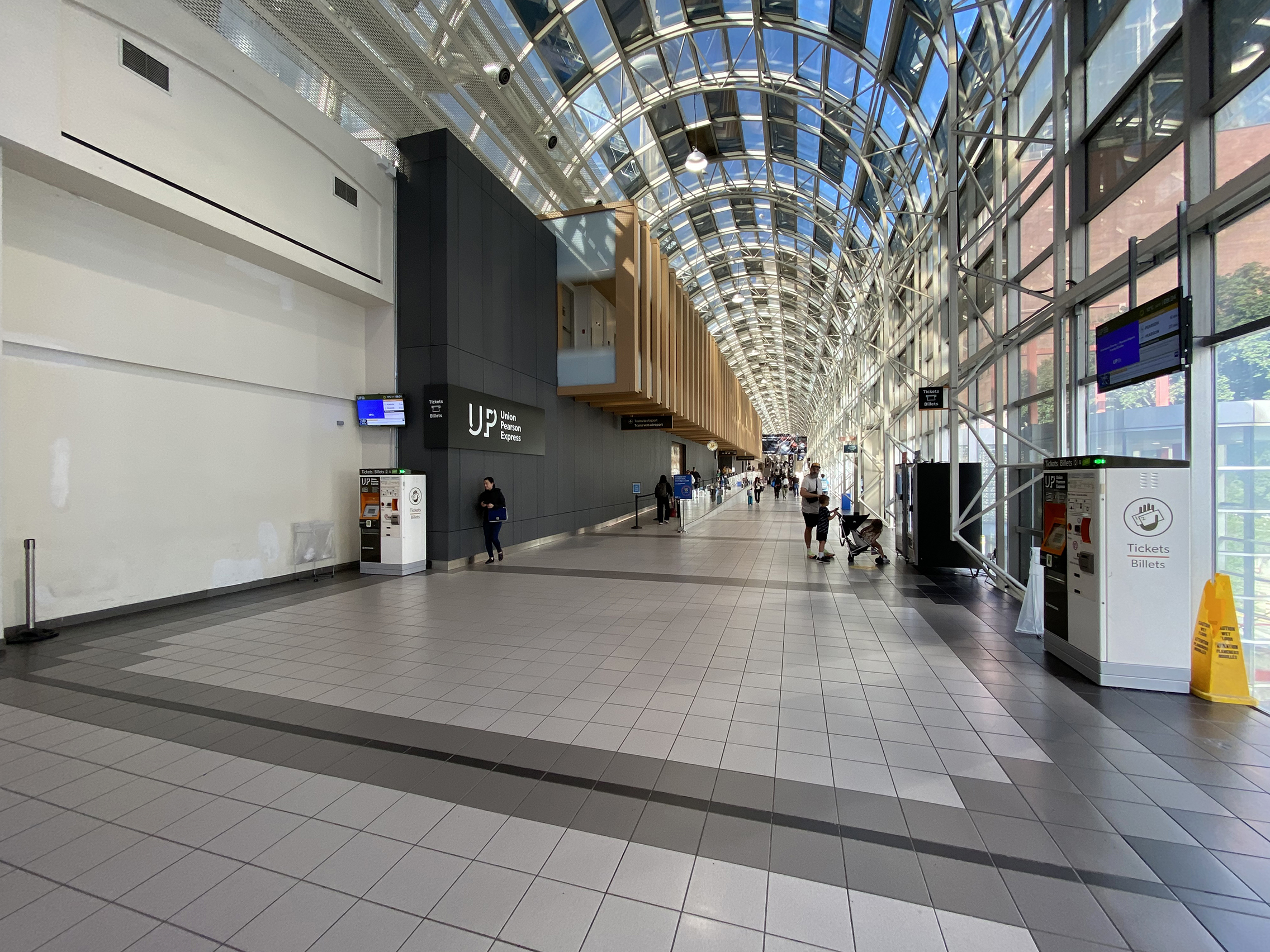
Union Pearson Express station at SkyWalk

From east to west:

- Union Station (Toronto)
- York Street Teamway
- Canadian National Express Building
- Union Pearson Express Station
- Simcoe Street Tunnel
- Metro Toronto Convention Centre
- Ripley's Aquarium of Canada
- CN Tower
- Rogers Centre

== See also ==
- Footbridge
- EdgeWalk
