= Spring of St. Anna, Rivne Oblast =

Coordinates: 50°10′48″N 25°35′47″E

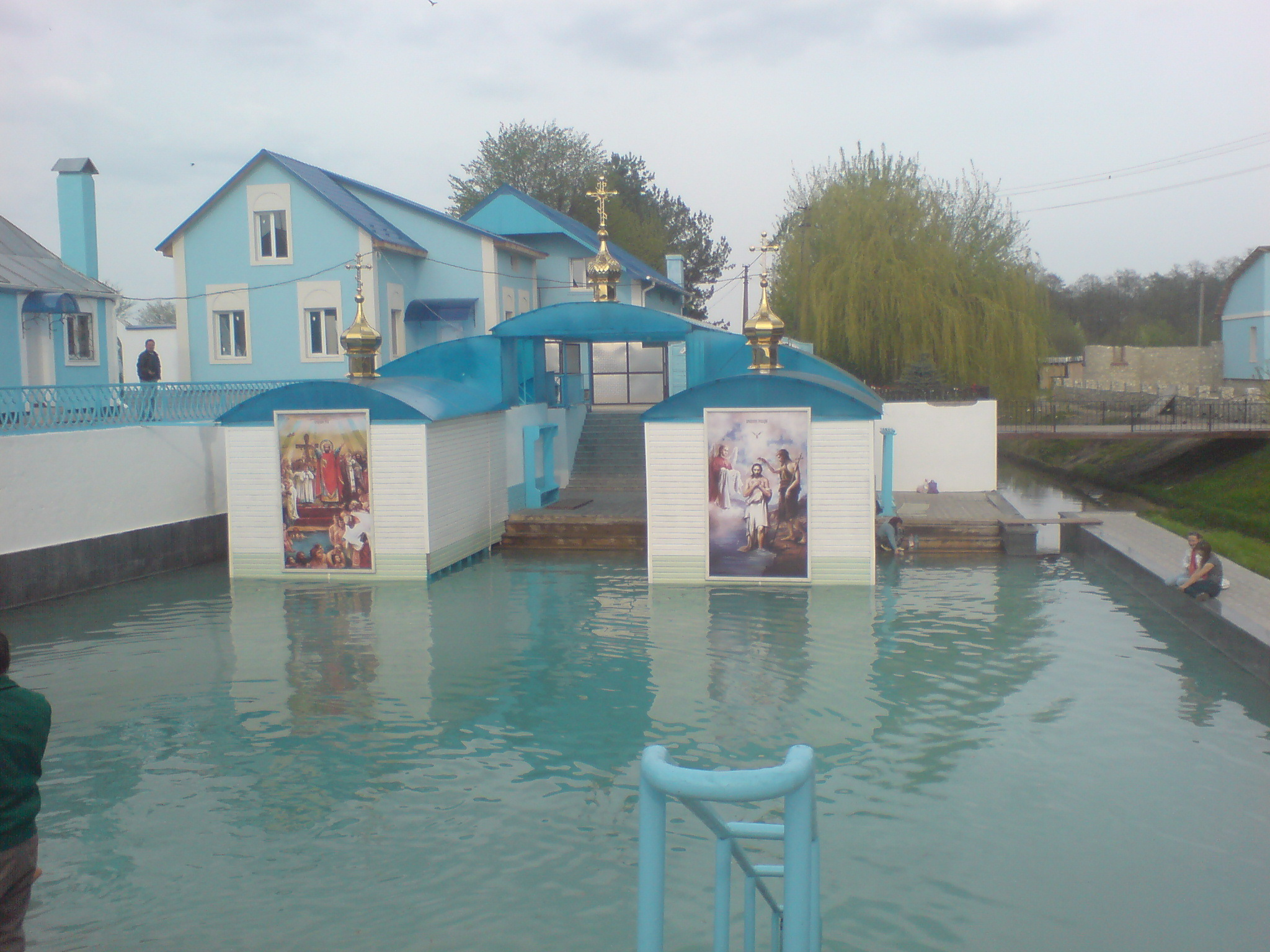
Spring of St. Anna

Spring of St. Anna is located one kilometer from the village Onyshkivtsi, Rivne Oblast, Ukraine. The spring of St. Anna is a hydrological nature monument of local importance. Stable water temperature is 6С (43F). This temperature remains the same, regardless of season. The spring of St. Anna is protected by the government.

== History ==
The healing features of spring water in the St. Anna spring have been recognized since 16th century. There are several legends that explain how the spring and church appeared in this place.

The first legend is about a former owner of the village Onyshkivtsi, whose name was Skorbnyk. He was seriously ill and spent a lot of money on doctor visits. Fearing for his life and no longer relying on human help, he finally asked God for help. Shedding many tears, he prayed to the Virgin Mary from his home. Skorbnyk asked for the forgiveness of his sins and healing of his disease. In a dream, he saw the Virgin Mary and promised her he would build a small chapel after he becomes healthy again. She pointed to a place where the chapel should be erected.

Legend has it that the Virgin Mary was sighted at that exact place. The Virgin Mary ordered Skorbnyk to take the icon he was praying to when his healing was received and place it in the chapel. After his healing, Skorbnyk immediately built a chapel on the specified location and moved there with a procession from his house. Shortly thereafter, Skorbnyk presented the village of Onyshkivtsi to another owner and moved to different village. When Skorbnyk was moving, he wanted to take his beloved icon with him, so he sent a boy to the chapel to retrieve it. With the icon of St. Anna in hand, the boy attempted to leave the chapel, however, an invisible force blocked the exit. The boy was terrified and could not move. In tears, he placed the icon back in the exact spot he had taken it from. The news of this miracle spread quickly and many people started to come with a hope of healing.

The second legend is slightly different. It was said that long ago, at the place where the spring is, there was a church. When the land suffered devastating attacks from the Tatars, the church was destroyed, but remained at the same place as if it were hiding somewhere underground. In time, Onyshkivtsi rebuilt the church, however, a miracle took place at the location of the old chapel. Sightings of the icon of St. Anna appeared first to the children-shepherds. The farmers gathered where the sightings had taken place and brought the icon to the new church. However, the next day the icon appeared back in the place where it was originally found, which happened to be the site of the old church. Local people attempted to bring it back to the new church, this time with all the rituals. But again, the very next day, the icon had reappeared at its original location. It became clear to the people that Saint Anna herself had chosen this place. As a result of this revelation, a chapel was built in the location St. Anna had chosen and soon after, the healing spring appeared.

== Modern times ==
In 1991 a new stone church was opened in honor of St. Anna. Where the springs are, a wooden platform was later replaced by concrete slabs and cement walkways were constructed for visitor's convenience. An asphalt road now leads to the spring. On the south side of the church, there is a pool where people can immerse after prayer. On the north side there is a wall in the form of the iconostasis, displaying icons. By the springs, there are changing rooms and an enclosed pool.

In 2000, the St. Nicholas monastery for women opened. Future plans for the construction of a larger monastery are in the development stages as well.

== St. Anna Spring and Health ==
Water temperature in the spring is always 6С (43F) degrees, regardless of the weather conditions.

One of the secrets of healing springs is the presence of silver and flint in the water. Silver ions have antibacterial features. Organic remains of flint are capable of processing light energy in the tens of thousands of times the speed of regenerating reactions. Normal tap water, processed through flint, becomes healthier and can be preserved for many years. Flint water is bactericidal. It destroys the influenza virus, quickly stops external bleeding, soothes a toothache, is effective for angina and running nose, paradontosis, and eliminates heartburn.

It is also effective for chronic diseases of stomach and duodenum. Flint water can reduce the sugar level in blood, eliminate sand from the kidney and gall bladder, affect the normalization of liver and kidney functions, improve metabolism, and significantly improve the overall health. It has also been said that water from St. Anna spring can heal women from sterility.
