= Processional walkway =

Structure

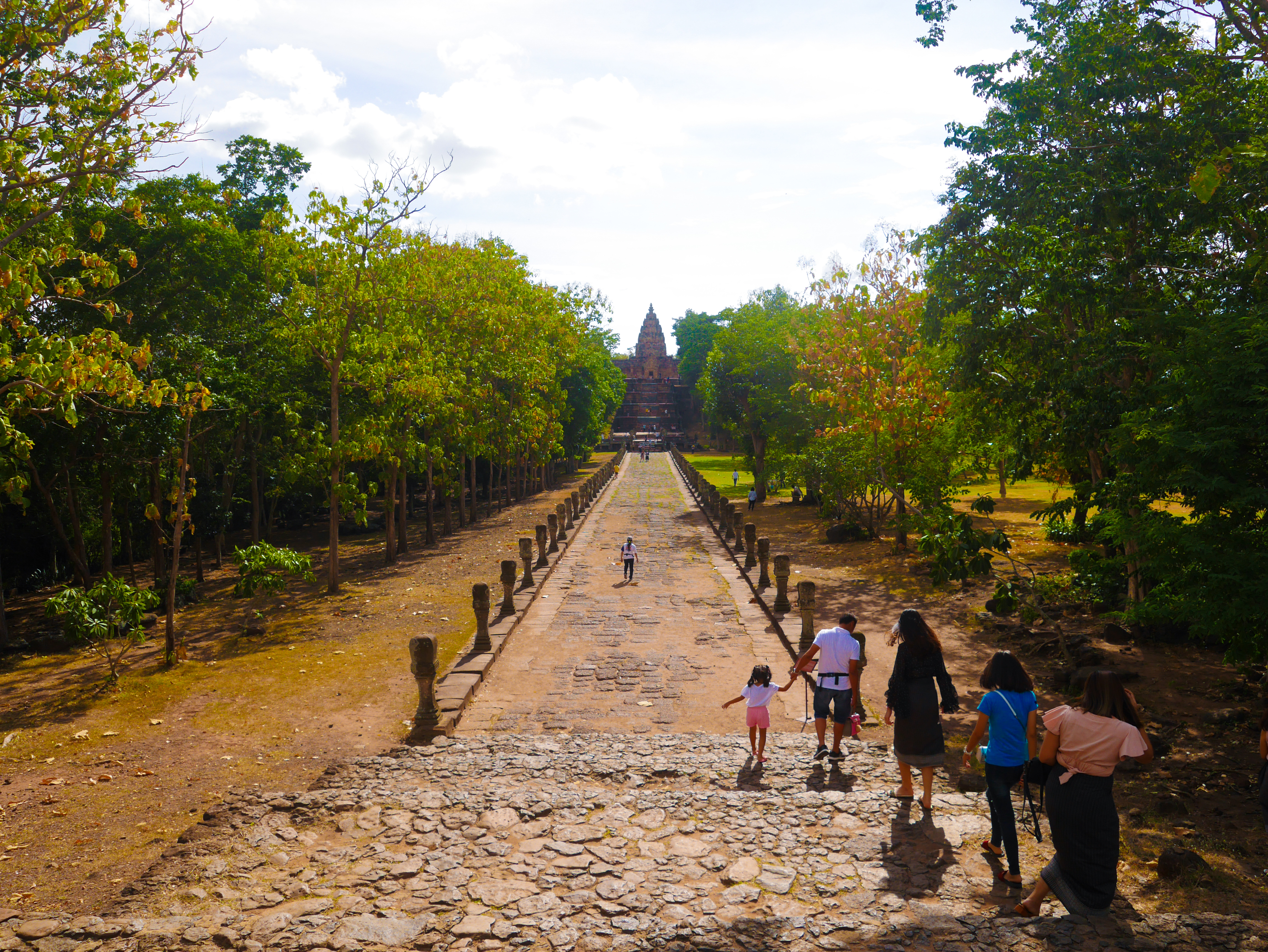
Processional walkway at Phanom Rung Historical Park in Thailand

A processional walkway is a ceremonial walkway in use since ancient times. Common functions of a processional walkway are for religious, governmental or celebratory purposes.

Early examples of this type of pedestrian travel way can be found in Egypt, Babylon and Crete. Ancient processional walkways were often associated with the design of palaces such as Phaistos on Minoan Crete.

The processional walkway is also an element of contemporary outdoor garden design.

== See also ==
- Footpath
- Promenade
