= Lower Simcoe Street underpass murals =

Pair of paintings in Toronto, Ontario, Canada

Coordinates: 43°38′37″N 79°23′4″W

Murals were unveiled along the Lower Simcoe Street underpass in Toronto, Ontario, in 2019. Lead artist Tannis Nielsen worked with Indigenous artists to create the artworks. According to Muskrat Magazine, Gchi-twaa-wendan Nibi ("Honour the Water") on the eastern wall is dedicated to the Water Walkers, and 'N' gekaajig kidowog ("My Elders Said") on the western wall commemorates elders in Toronto.

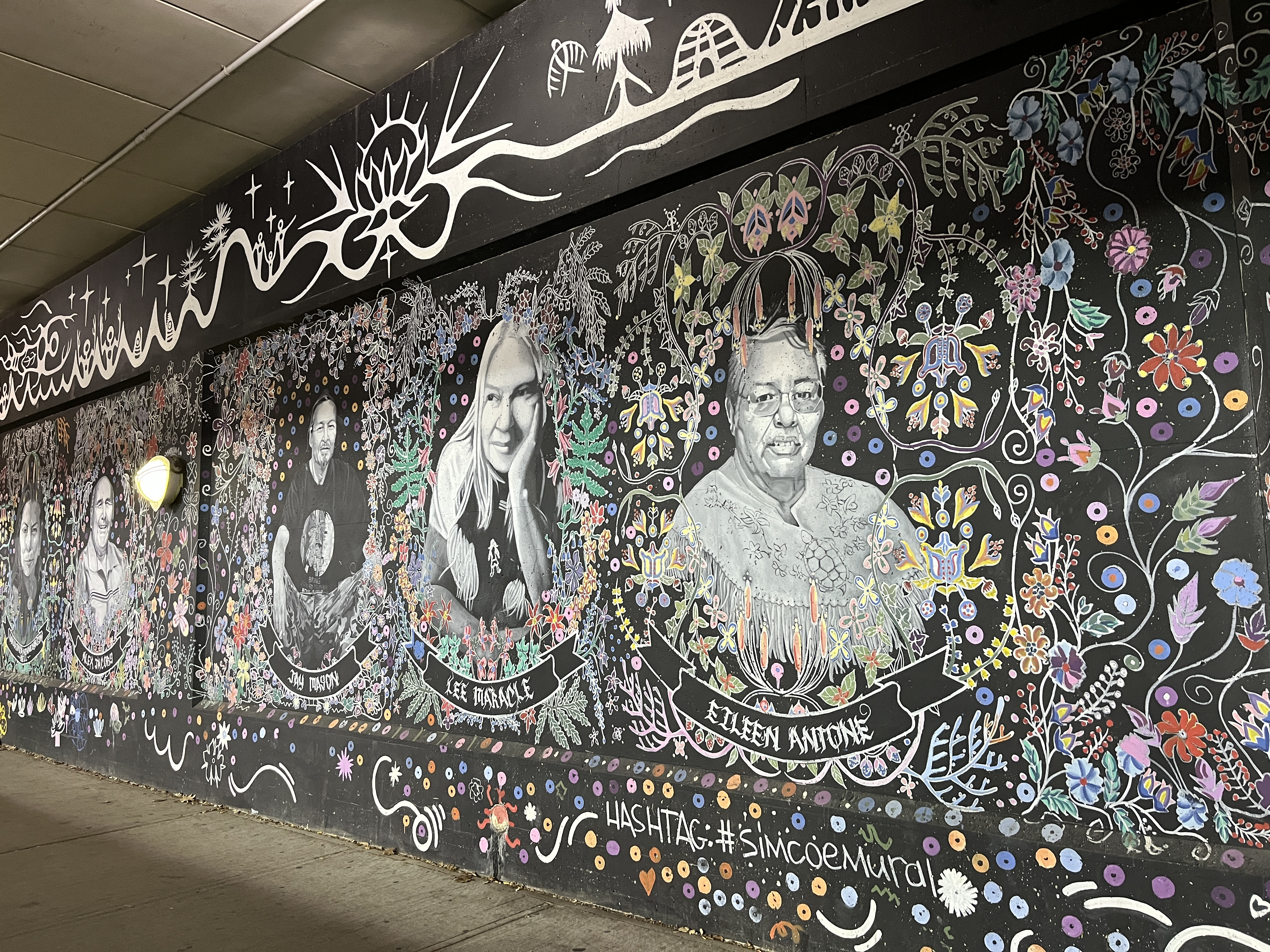

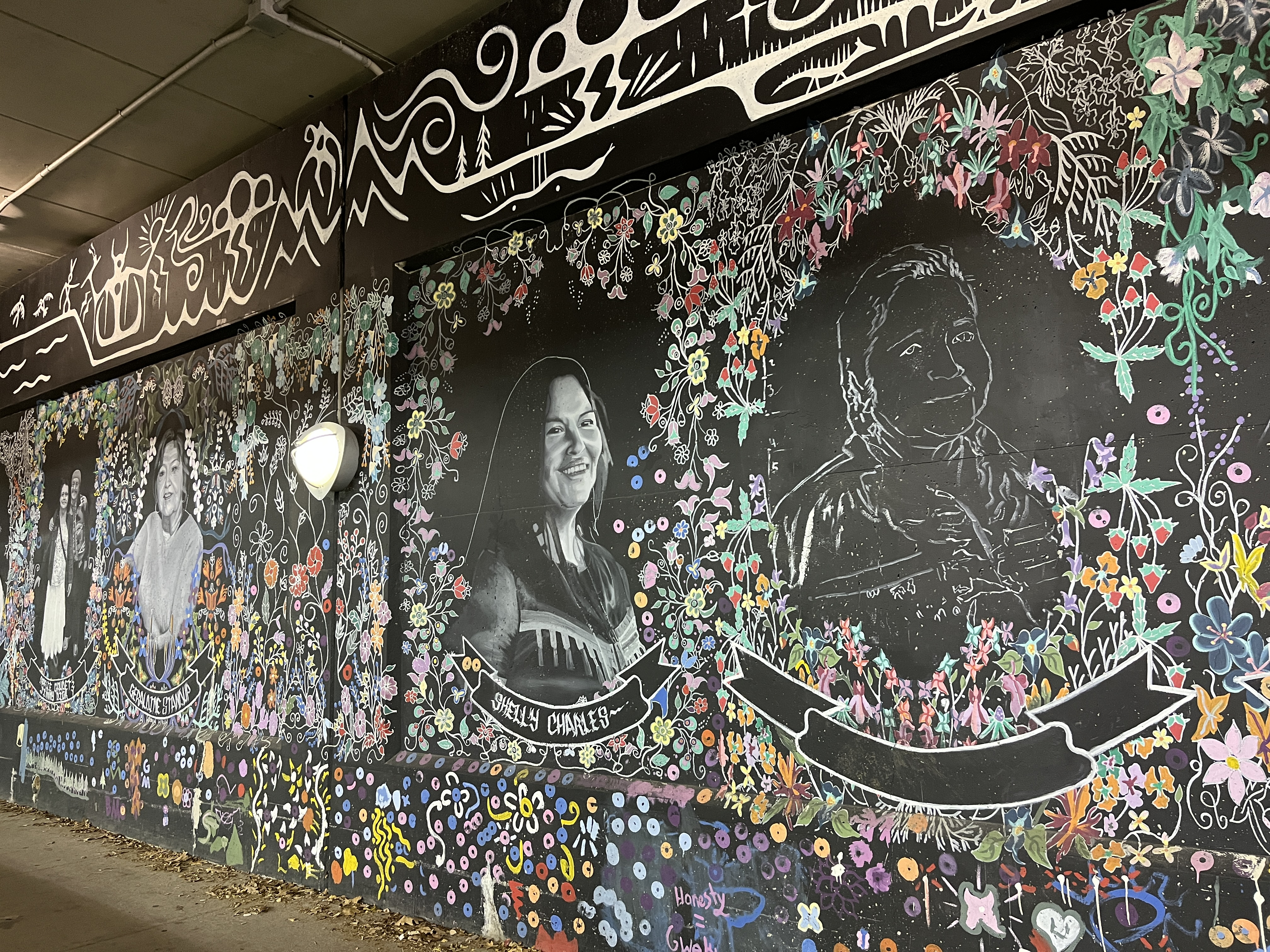

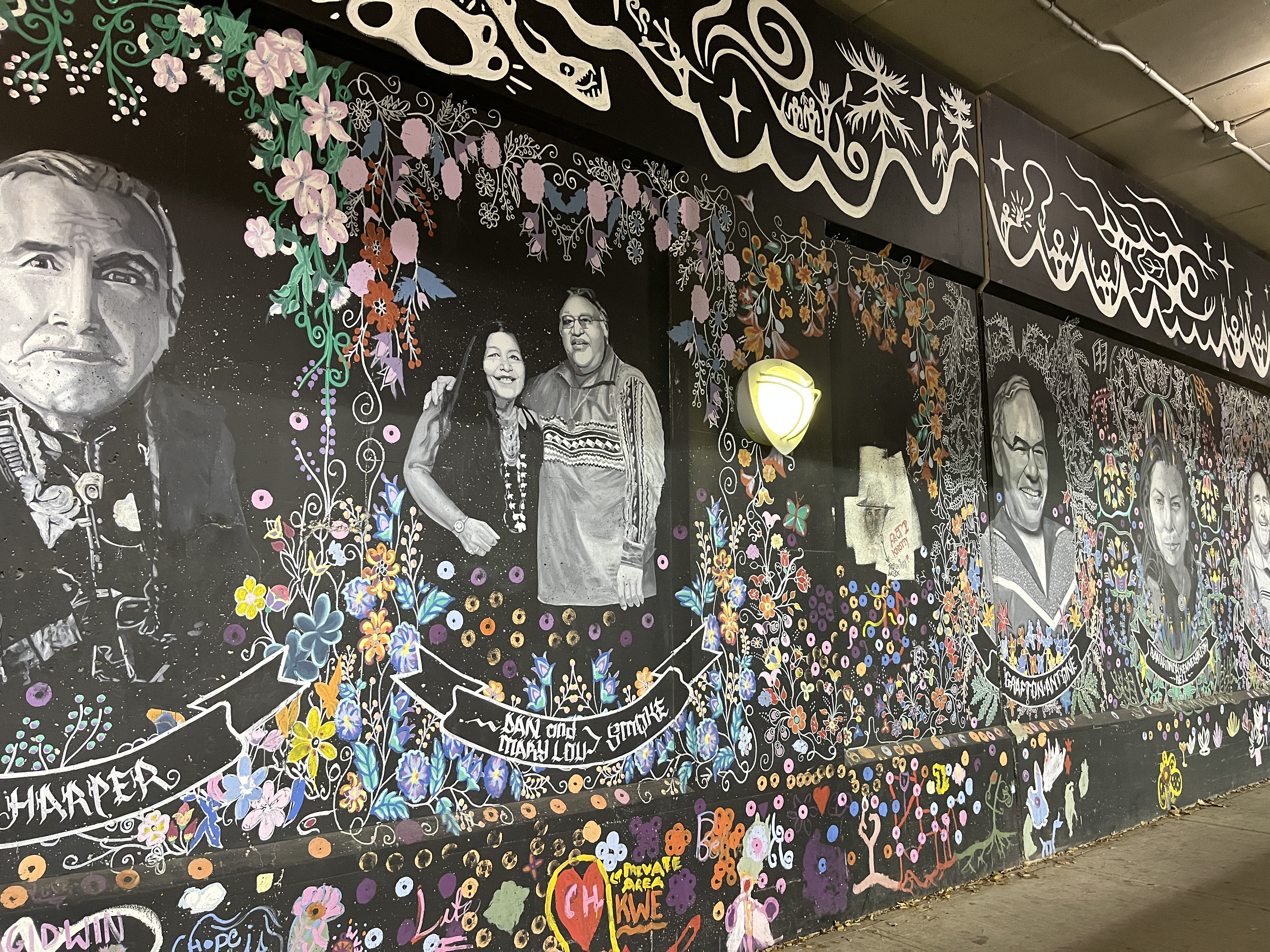

== See also ==
- Simcoe Street Tunnel
