= Ripley's Aquarium of Canada =

Public aquarium in Toronto, Ontario

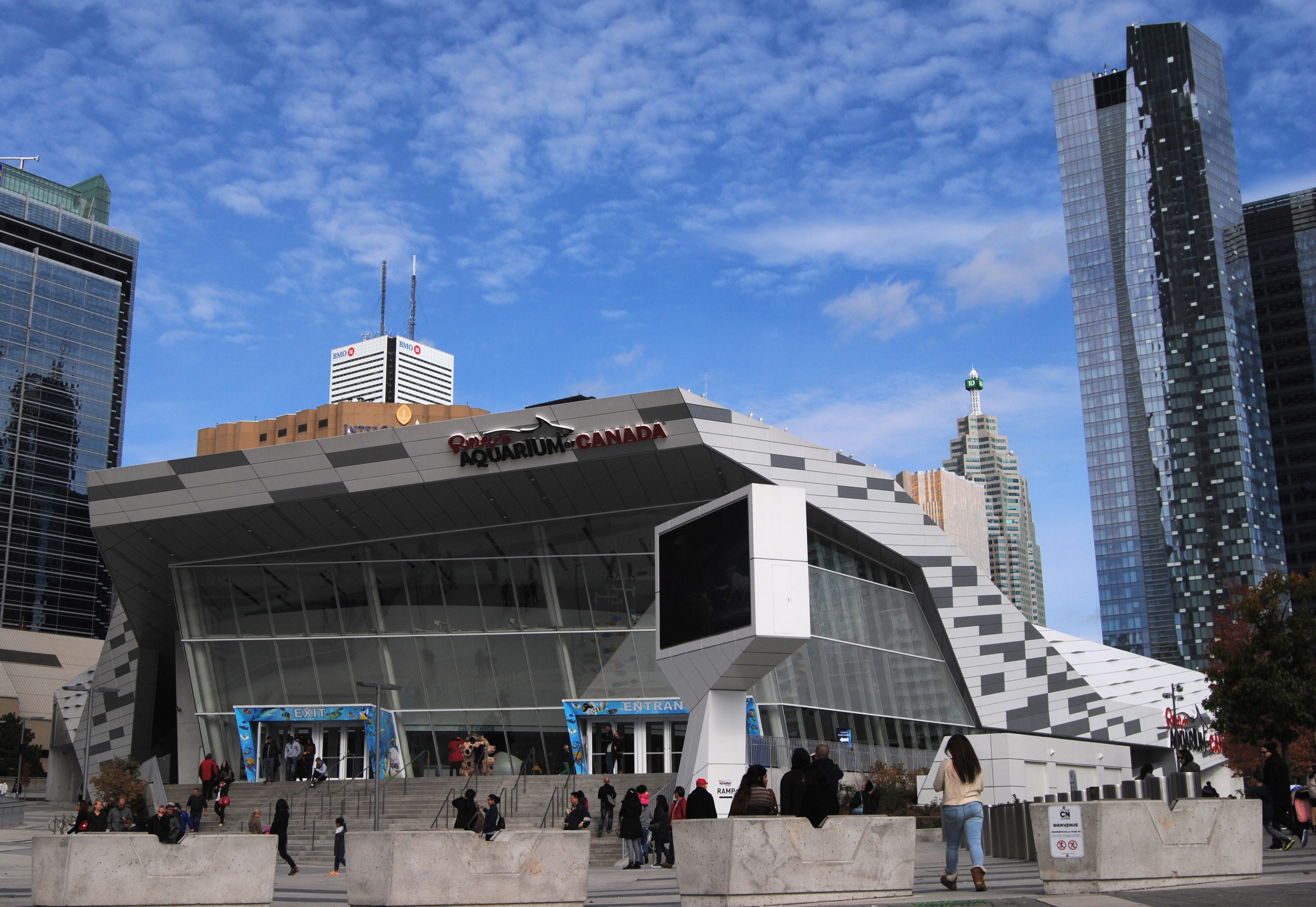
- Interactive map of Ripley's Aquarium of Canada
- 43.642481°N 79.38605°W
- Date opened: October 16, 2013 (12 years ago)
- Location: 288 Bremner Boulevard; Toronto, Ontario; M5V 3L9
- Floor space: 12,500 m^{2} (135,000 sq ft)
- No. of animals: 16,000
- Volume of largest tank: 2,840,000 litres (750,000 US gal)
- Total volume of tanks: 5,700,000 litres (1,506,000 US gal)
- Public transit: Union Station; Union
- Website: www.ripleyaquariums.com/canada/

Ripley's Aquarium of Canada is a public aquarium in Toronto, Ontario, Canada. The aquarium is one of three aquariums owned-and-operated by Ripley Entertainment. It is located in downtown Toronto, just southeast of the CN Tower. The aquarium has 5.7 million litres (1.25 million gallons) of marine and freshwater habitats from across the world. The exhibits hold more than 20,000 exotic sea and freshwater specimens from more than 450 species.

== History ==
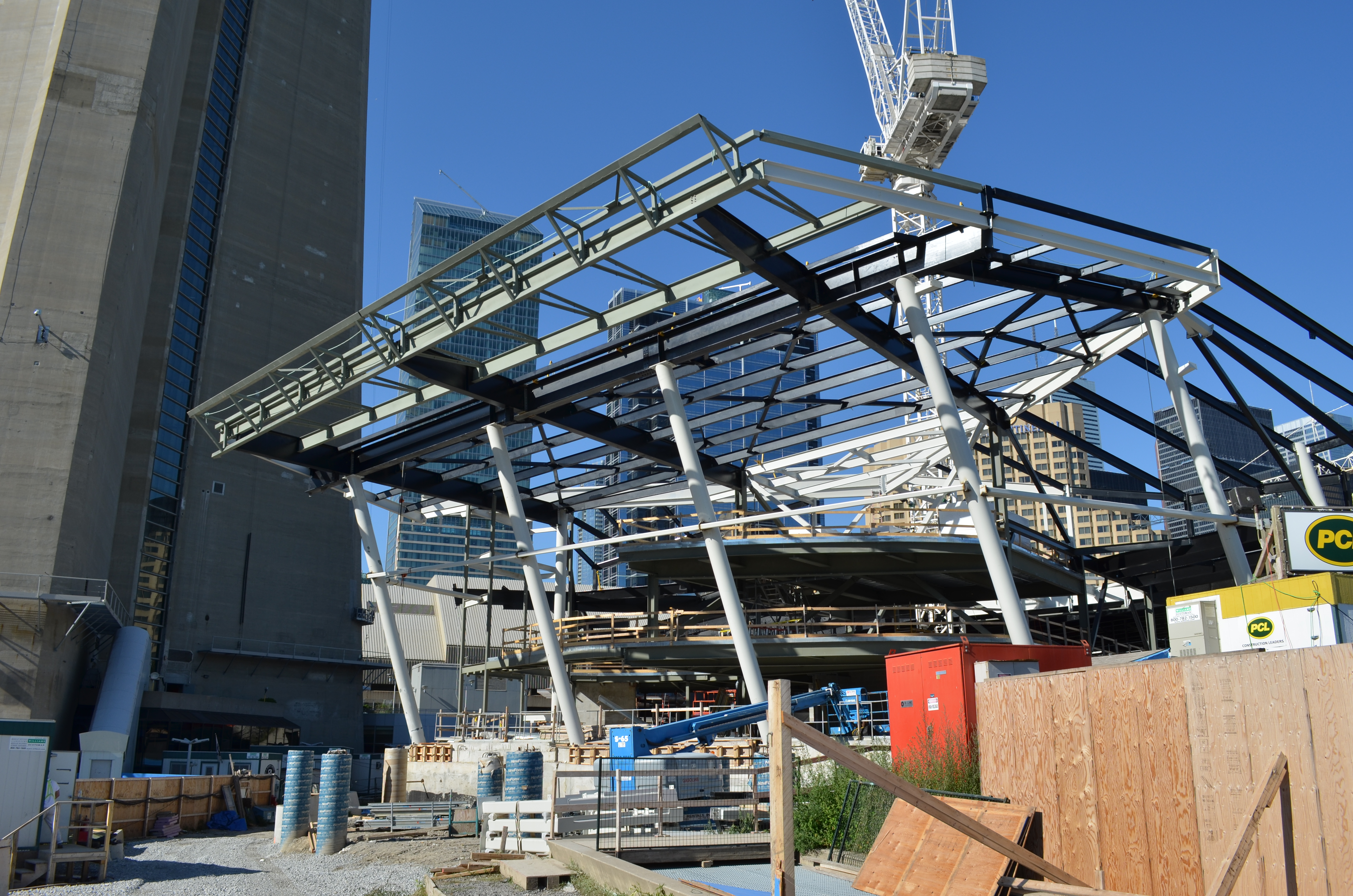
Ripley's Aquarium a year into construction in August 2012

A Ripley's Aquarium was originally planned in 2004 to be built in Niagara Falls, Ontario, next to what is now Great Wolf Lodge around 2007, but plans fell through and Ripley's eventually relocated to Toronto. Construction began on the attraction in August 2011 with a final cost approaching CA$130 million. The aquarium opened to the public in October 2013.

The project was a partnership with three levels of government. The federal government's Canada Lands Company contributed CA$10 million to the project to develop the "John Street Corridor" linking Front Street with the aquarium, the CN Tower and the Rogers Centre. The Government of Ontario contributed CA$11 million to the project, and the City of Toronto government provided property-tax incentives amounting to between CA$8 million and CA$12 million over the first twelve years of the aquarium.

Ripley's Aquarium has been the target of animal liberation groups such as TARA (Toronto Aquarium Resistance) and MAD (Marineland Animal Defence), which claim animal captivity is synonymous with animal abuse. They regularly conduct protests and demonstrations at the facility.

== Building ==
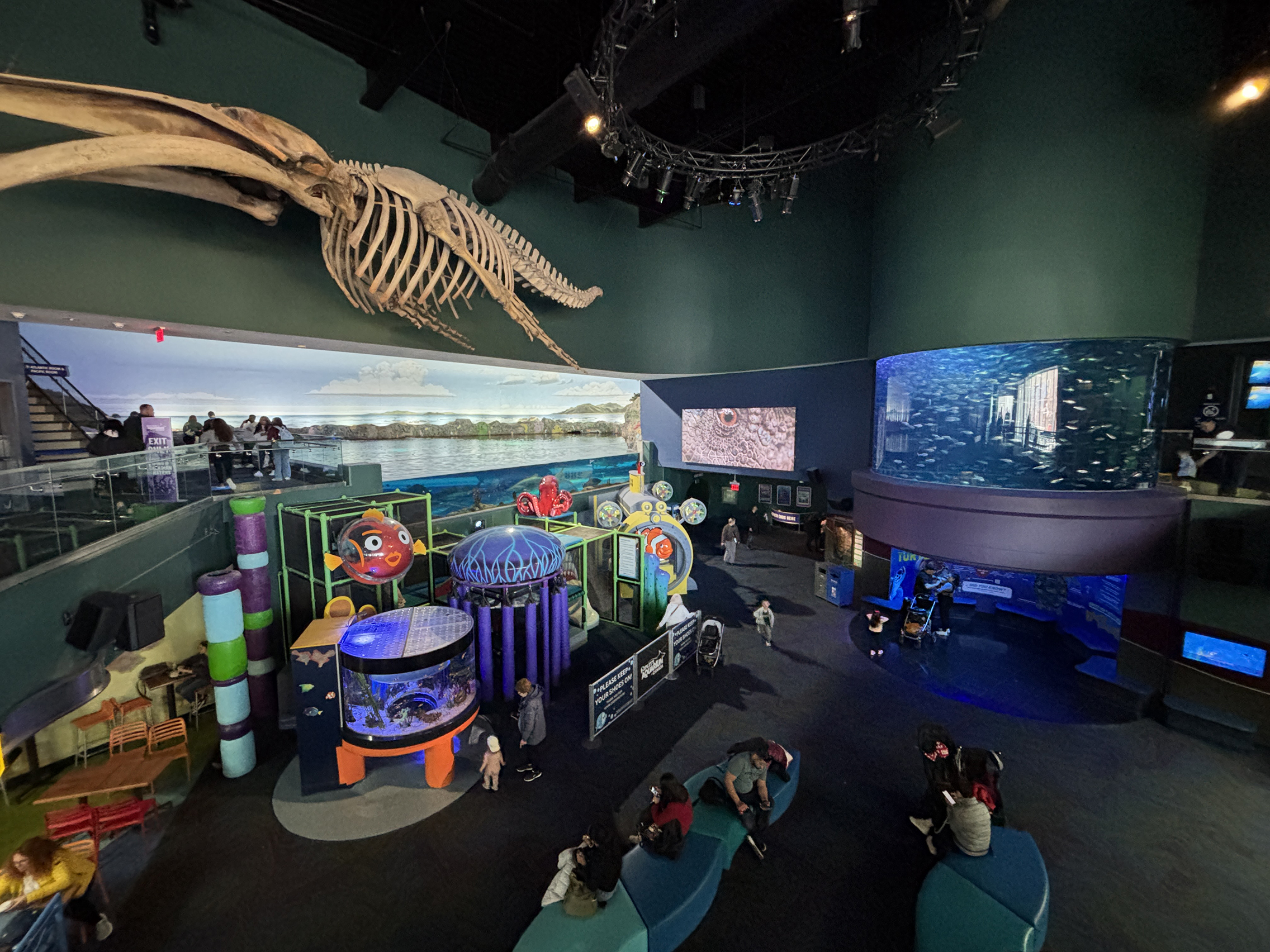
Interior of the aquarium

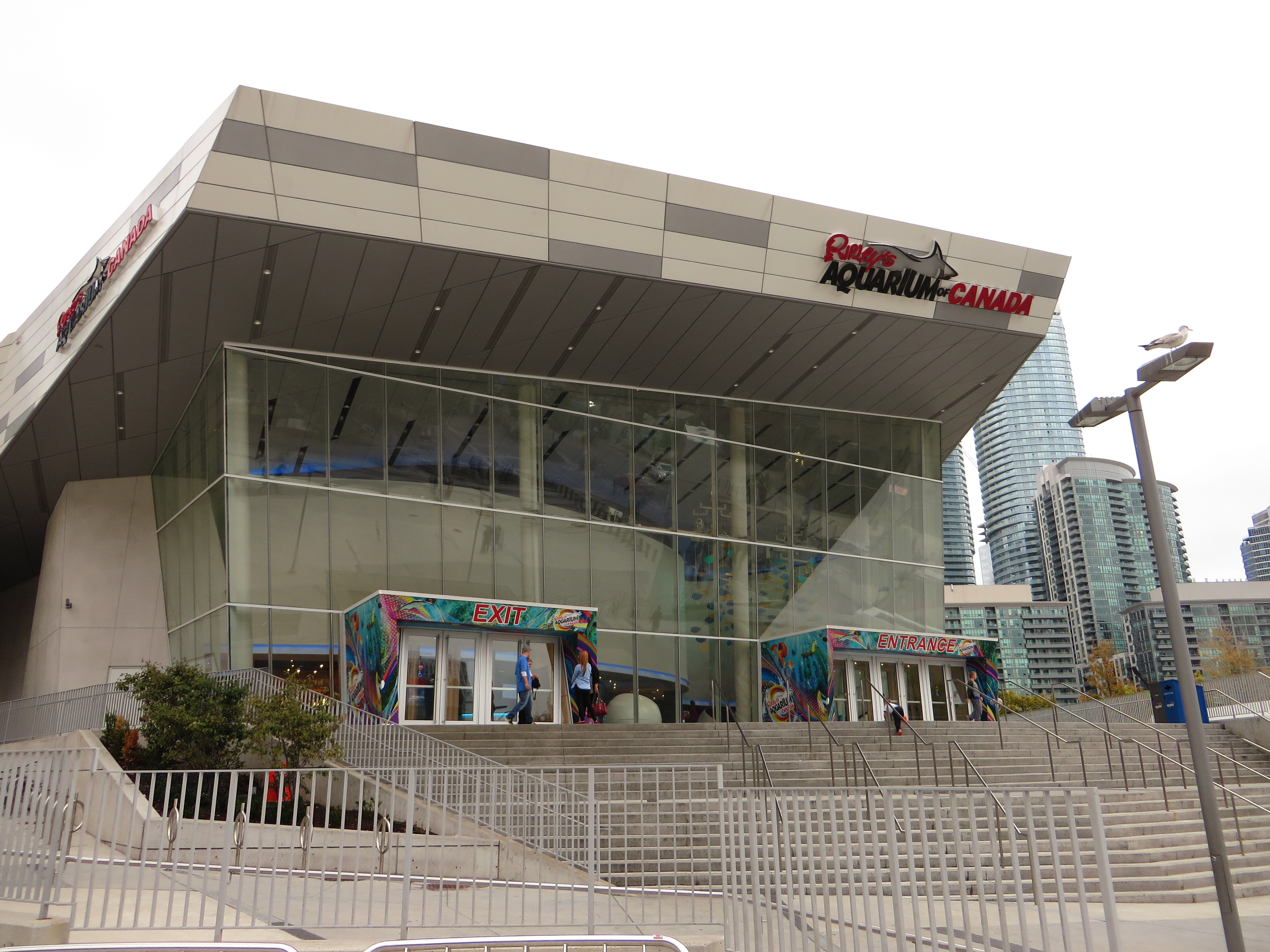
The roof of the main entrance was designed to give the illusion of the Earth's crust peeling away to reveal a window into the aquatic world.

The building features a multi-faceted shell clad in large aluminum panels, with the roof of the main entrance that "gives the illusion of the earth's crust peeling away to reveal a window into the aquatic world." There are also coloured surfaces that juxtapose reflective aluminum soffits. The building was designed with special shielding so that sharks would not be disturbed by its electrical systems.

=== Access ===
The building is located on Bremner Boulevard, to the east of the Rogers Centre, just south of the CN Tower and across the street from the Roundhouse Railway Museum. The aquarium is accessible from the Union subway station using the SkyWalk pedestrian pathway. The building does not have parking of its own. Parking is available in several underground parking garages nearby and surface parking lots. The nearest highway access is the Gardiner Expressway by exiting at York Street.

== Exhibits ==
The aquarium holds 5.7 million litres (1.5 million gallons) of water and shows marine and freshwater habitats from around the world. The aquarium is organized into ten galleries: Canadian Waters, Rainbow Reef, Dangerous Lagoon, Discovery Centre, The Gallery, Ray Bay, Swarm: Nature by Numbers, Planet Jellies, Life Support Systems and the Shoreline Gallery. It is home to more than 20,000 animals.

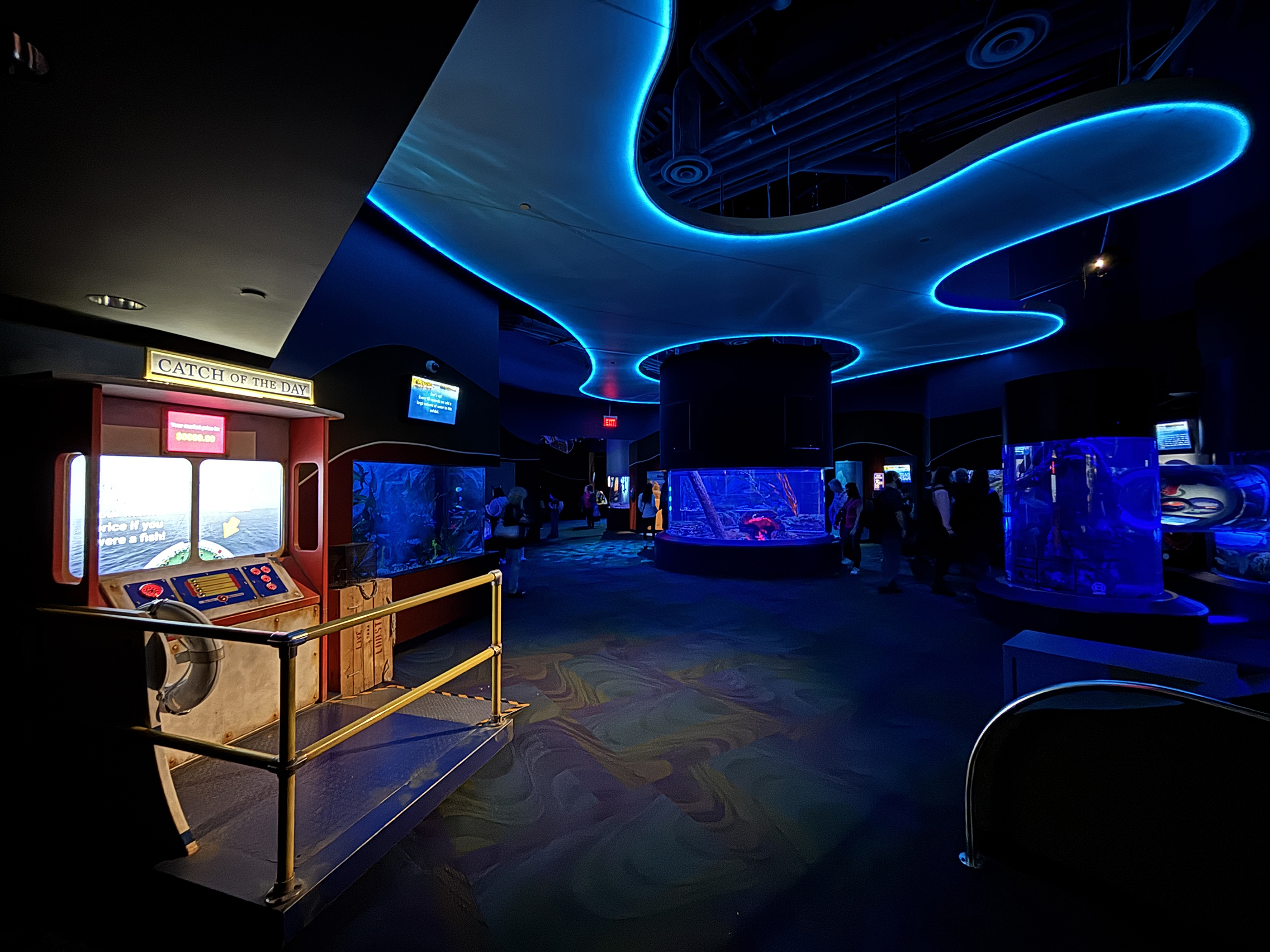
The Canadian Waters exhibit

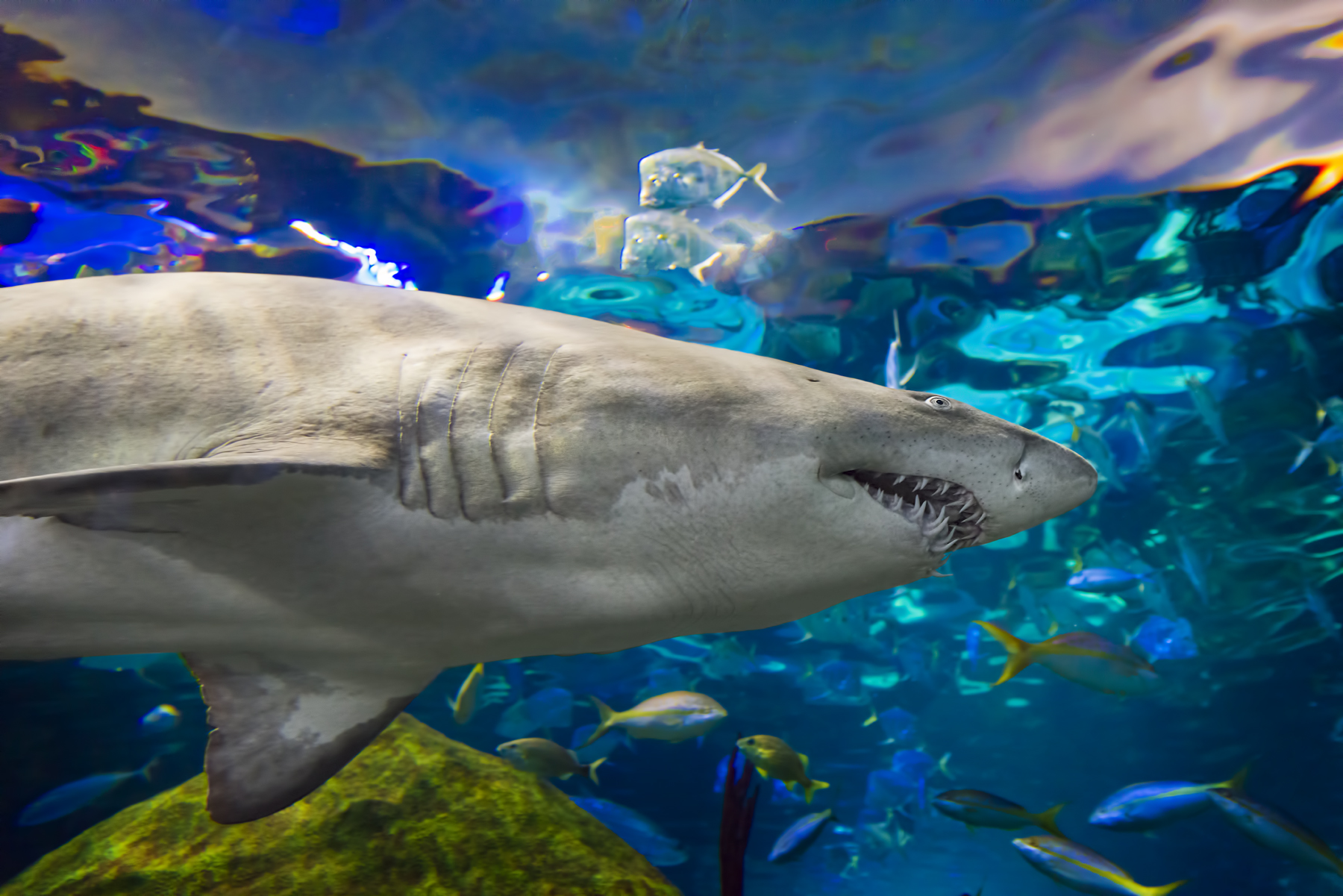
The Dangerous Lagoon exhibit includes several species of sharks, roughtail stingrays, longcomb sawfish, and green sea turtles.

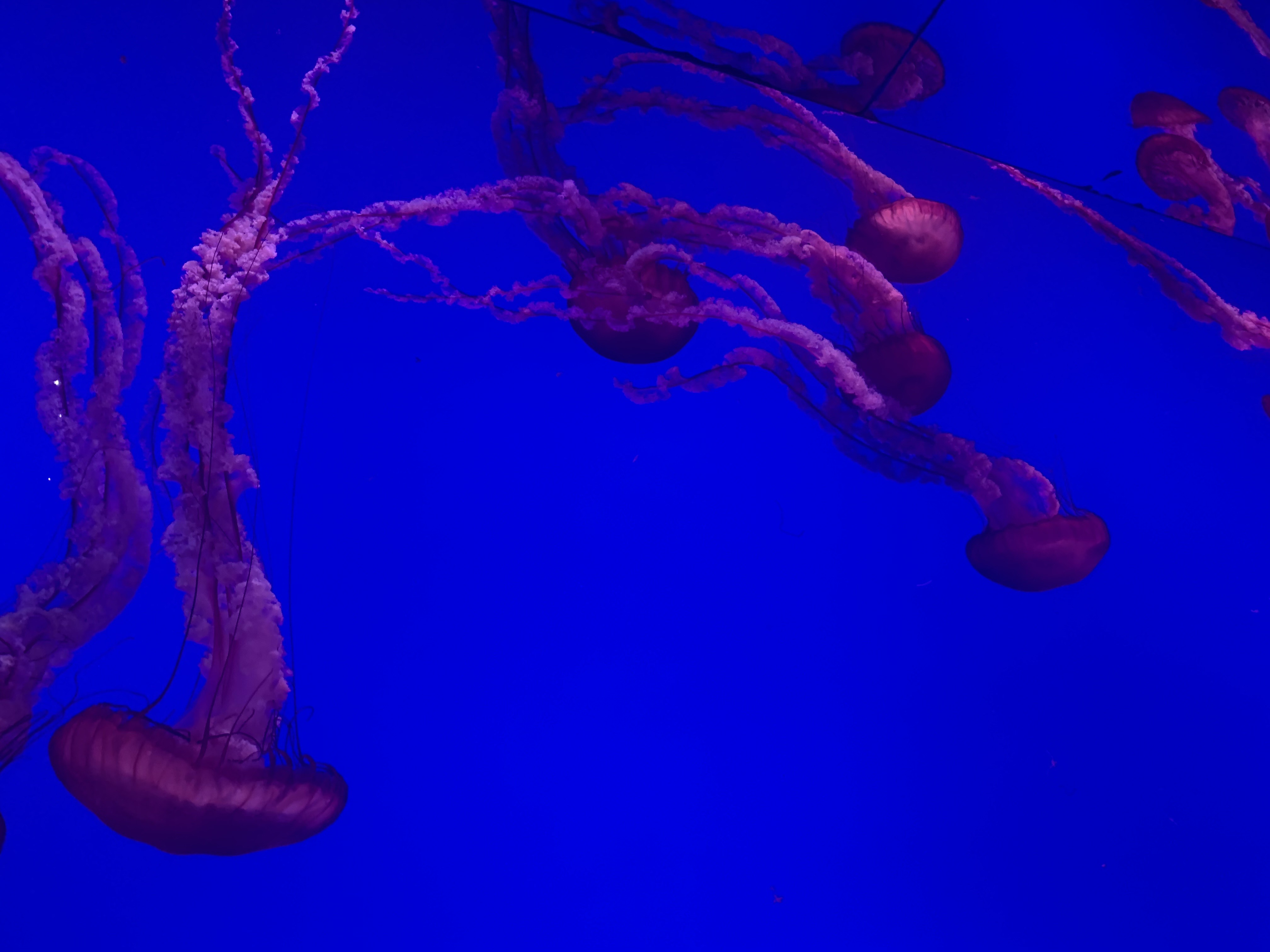
Pink Chrysaora fuscescens jellyfishes as seen in Ripley's Aquarium of Canada.

- The Canadian Waters exhibit features animals from all the bodies of water surrounding the country. The gallery has 17 habitats. Some animals featured in this exhibit include: alewife, largemouth bass, American lobster, wolf eel, lump fish, giant Pacific octopus, china rockfish
- The Rainbow Reef features animals from the Indo-Pacific water regions and is the most colourful gallery in the exhibit, hence its name. Some of the species in this exhibit include: Picasso triggerfish, humbug dascyllus, emperor angelfish, pajama cardinalfish, unicorn surgeonfish. The exhibit also features an interactive dive show.
- The Dangerous Lagoon is an underwater tunnel with a moving conveyor belt, which is the aquarium's largest tank. Some of the featured animals in this exhibit include sand tiger shark, sandbar shark, roughtail stingray, longcomb sawfish, green sea turtles.
- The Discovery Centre features various hands-on activities such as underwater viewing bubbles, a pop-up research submarine and a touch pool which allows visitors to touch living fossils. Discovery Centre inhabitants include clownfish, palette surgeonfish, horseshoe crab. The Touch exhibits give visitors the opportunity to touch the skins of various animals like sharks and sting-rays with the help of aquarium employees. This gallery is home to whitespotted bamboo sharks, brownbanded bamboo sharks, southern stingray, cownose rays.
- The Gallery exhibit, also known as Mother Nature's Art Gallery, features some of the most delicate underwater species from all over the world. This exhibit features the red lionfish, electric eel, lined seahorse, and the archerfish. This exhibit features six saltwater and three freshwater exhibits.
- The Planet Jellies exhibit has colour changing displays with five species of jellyfish. These include: Pacific sea nettle, moon jelly, spotted jelly, and upside-down jelly.
- The Ray Bay exhibit is focused on three distinct species of stingrays. Occasionally visitors can see aquarium divers feeding the stingrays during their daily interactive dive shows. Some of the inhabitants of this exhibit include the bonnethead shark, cownose ray, and the southern stingray.
- The Life Support System gives visitors, a behind-the-scenes look at the aquarium's life support systems room. The building features the largest life support systems room of Ripley's three aquariums. This gallery features equipment for Dangerous Reef and Ray Bay.
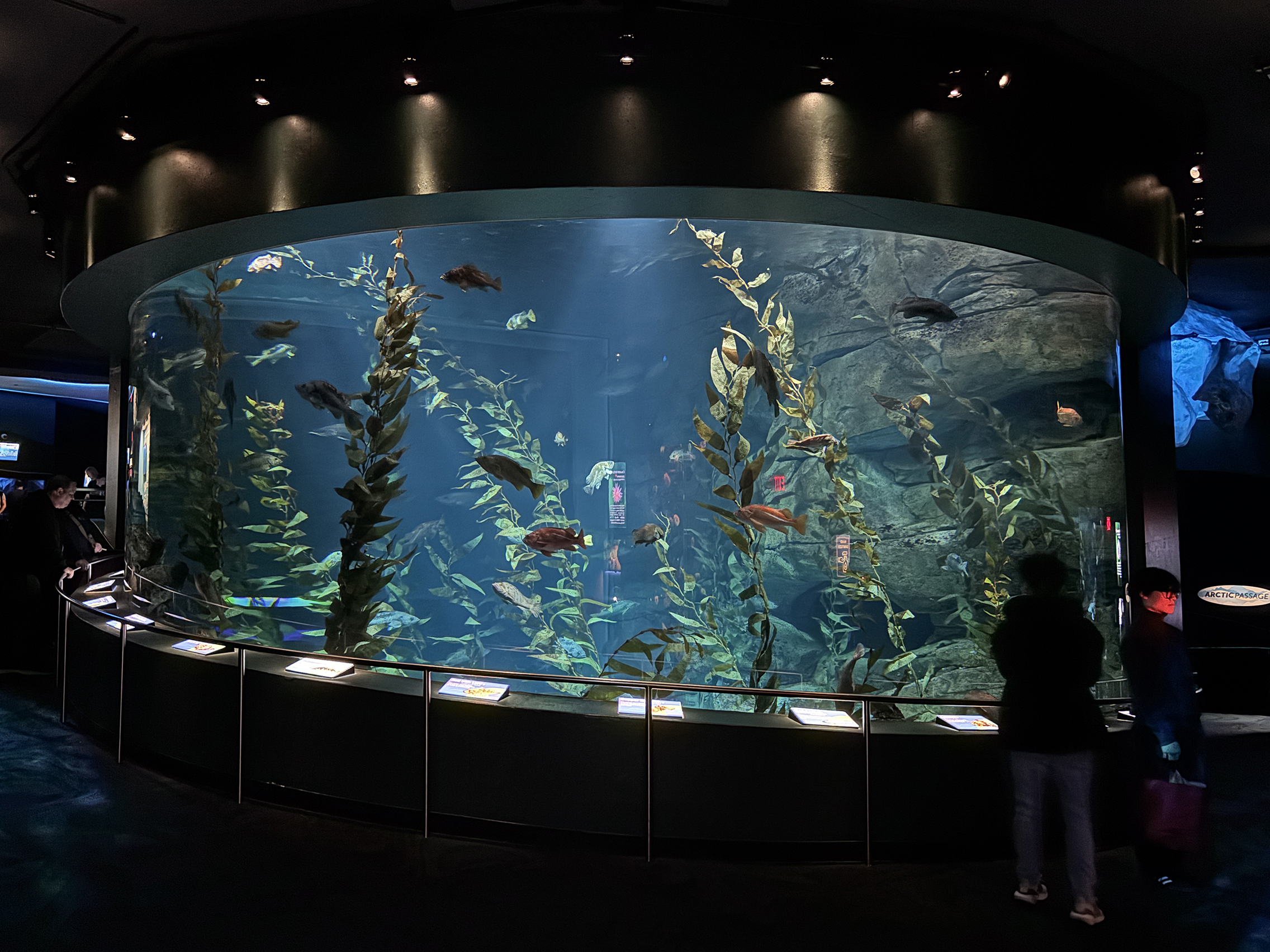
Pacific Kelp tank

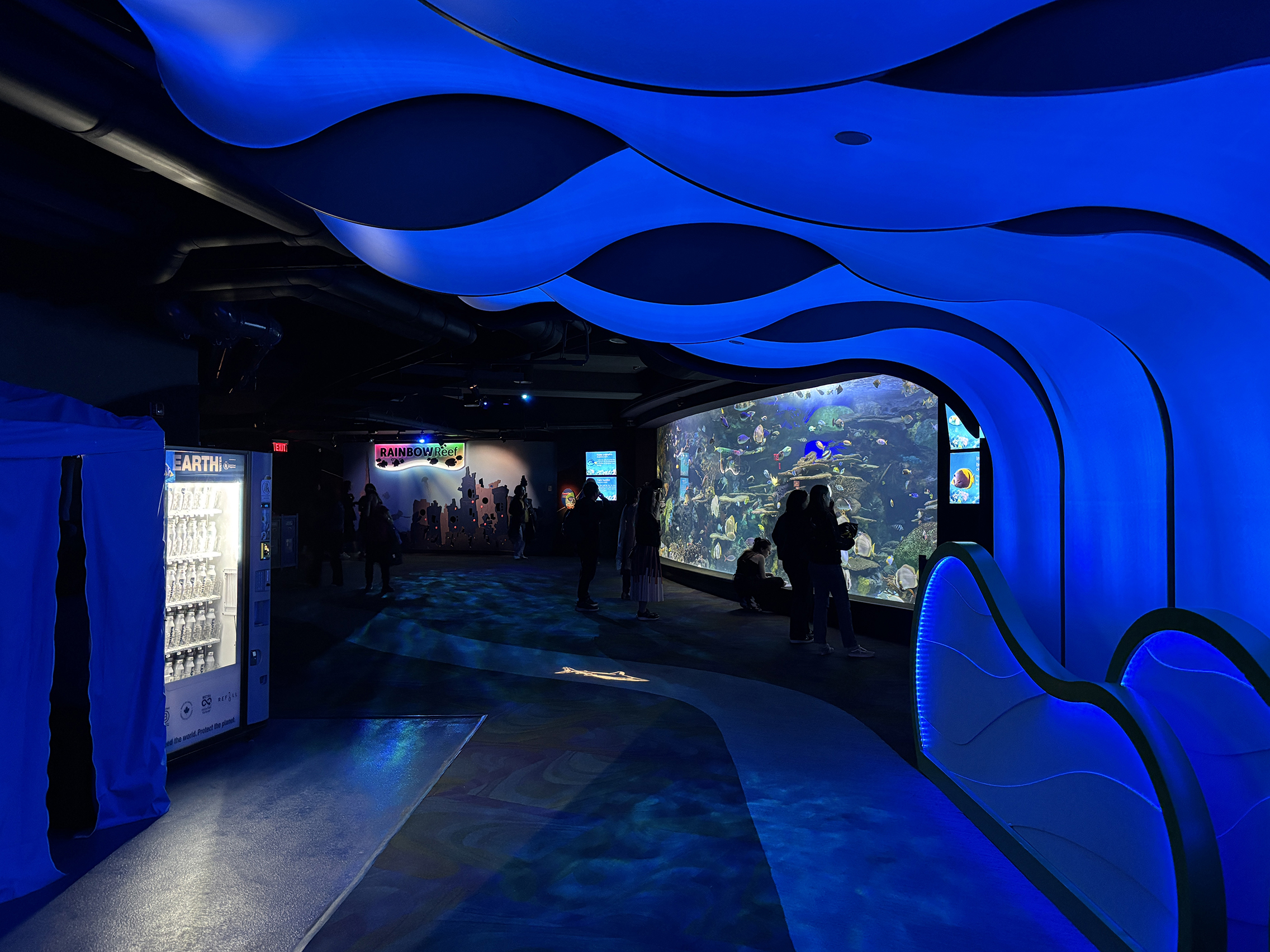
Rainbow Reef

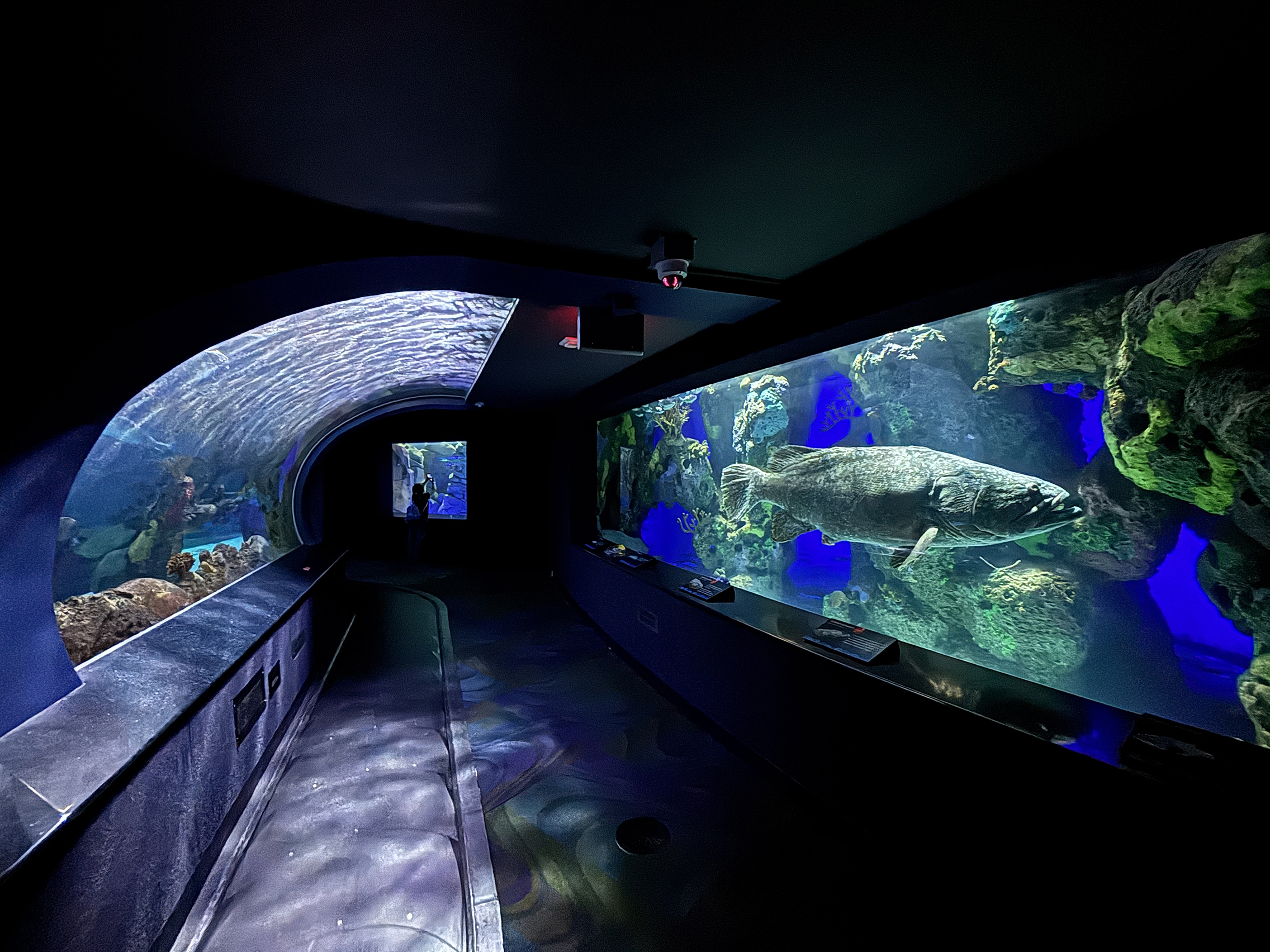
Dangerous Lagoon

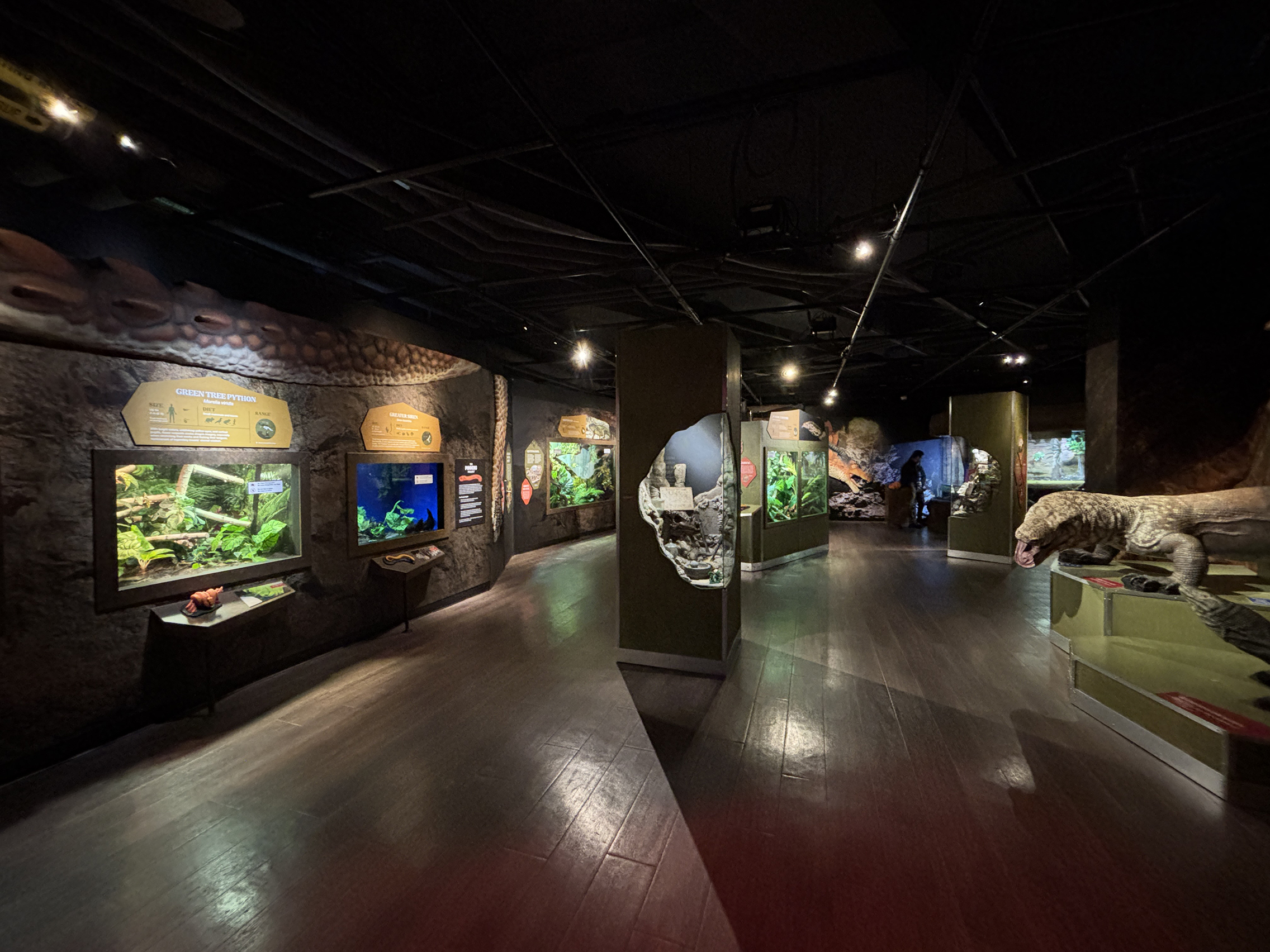
Dragons Myths made real

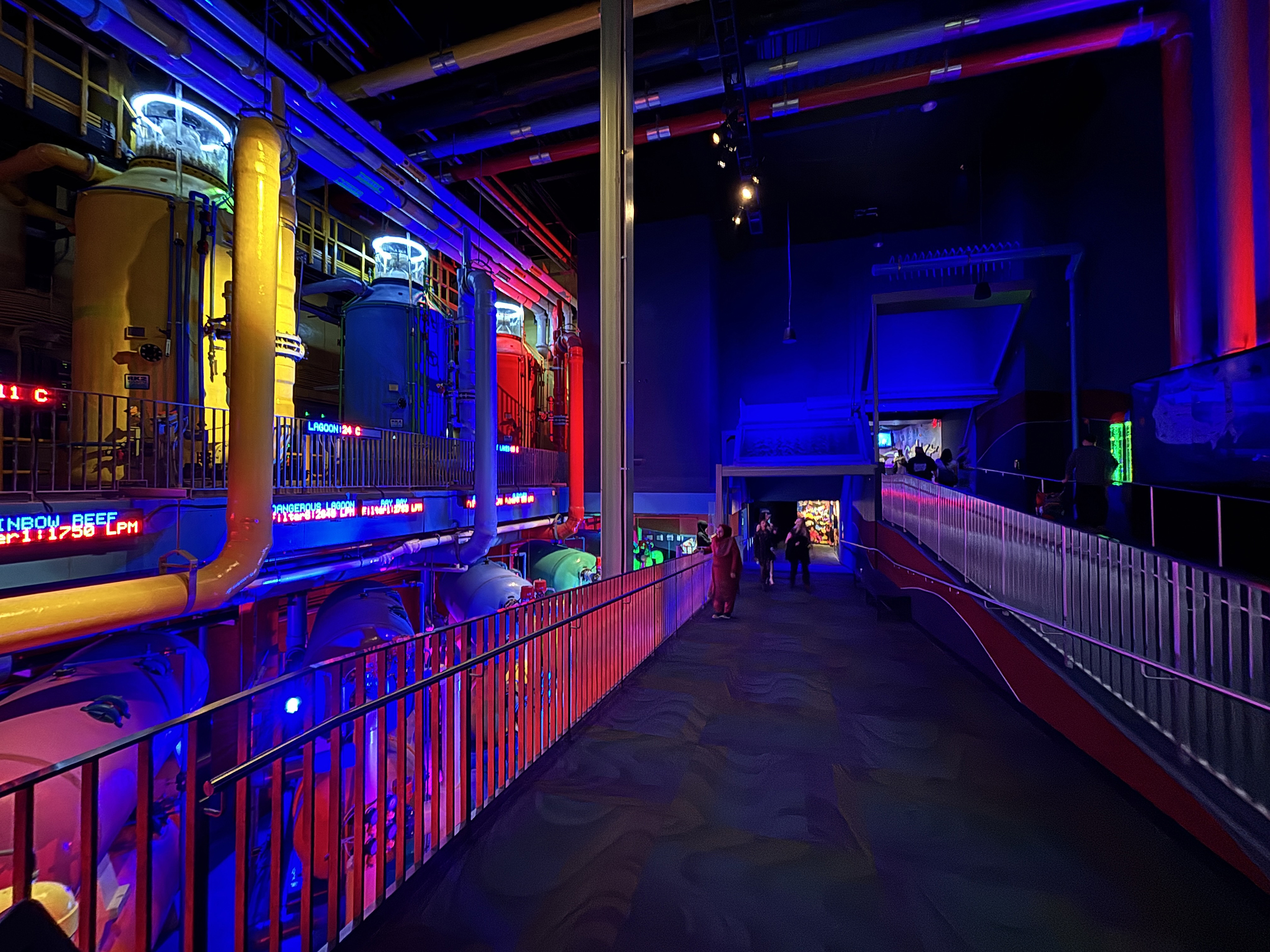
The Life Support System
