= Bremner Boulevard =

Street in Toronto, Ontario

Bremner Boulevard / Raptors Way
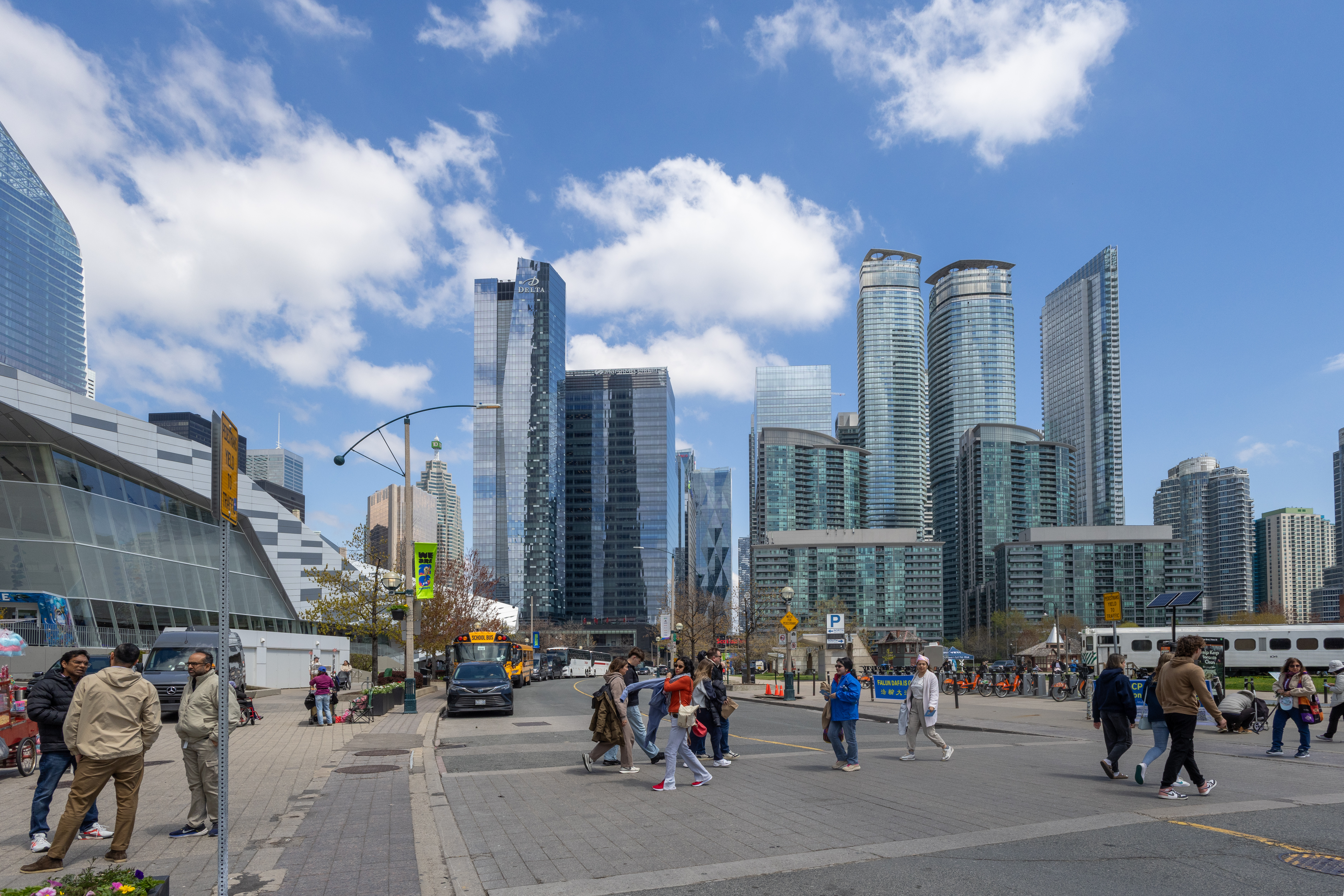
- Owner: City of Toronto
- Maintained by: City of Toronto
- Length: 1.2 kilometres (0.75 mi)
- Location: Toronto
- West end: Spadina Avenue
- East end: Lake Shore Boulevard West

Bremner Boulevard is a short street in downtown Toronto, Ontario, Canada. Several landmarks are located on the street, including the Rogers Centre, the CN Tower, the Toronto Railway Museum, Ripley's Aquarium of Canada, the Delta Toronto Hotel, Maple Leaf Square, and the west entrance to Scotiabank Arena. In the 2010s, many new developments were built on the street.

Following the Toronto Raptors victory in the 2019 NBA Finals, the section of Bremner Boulevard from York Street to Lake Shore Boulevard West was renamed Raptors Way.
