= Delta Toronto Hotel =

Luxury hotel in Toronto

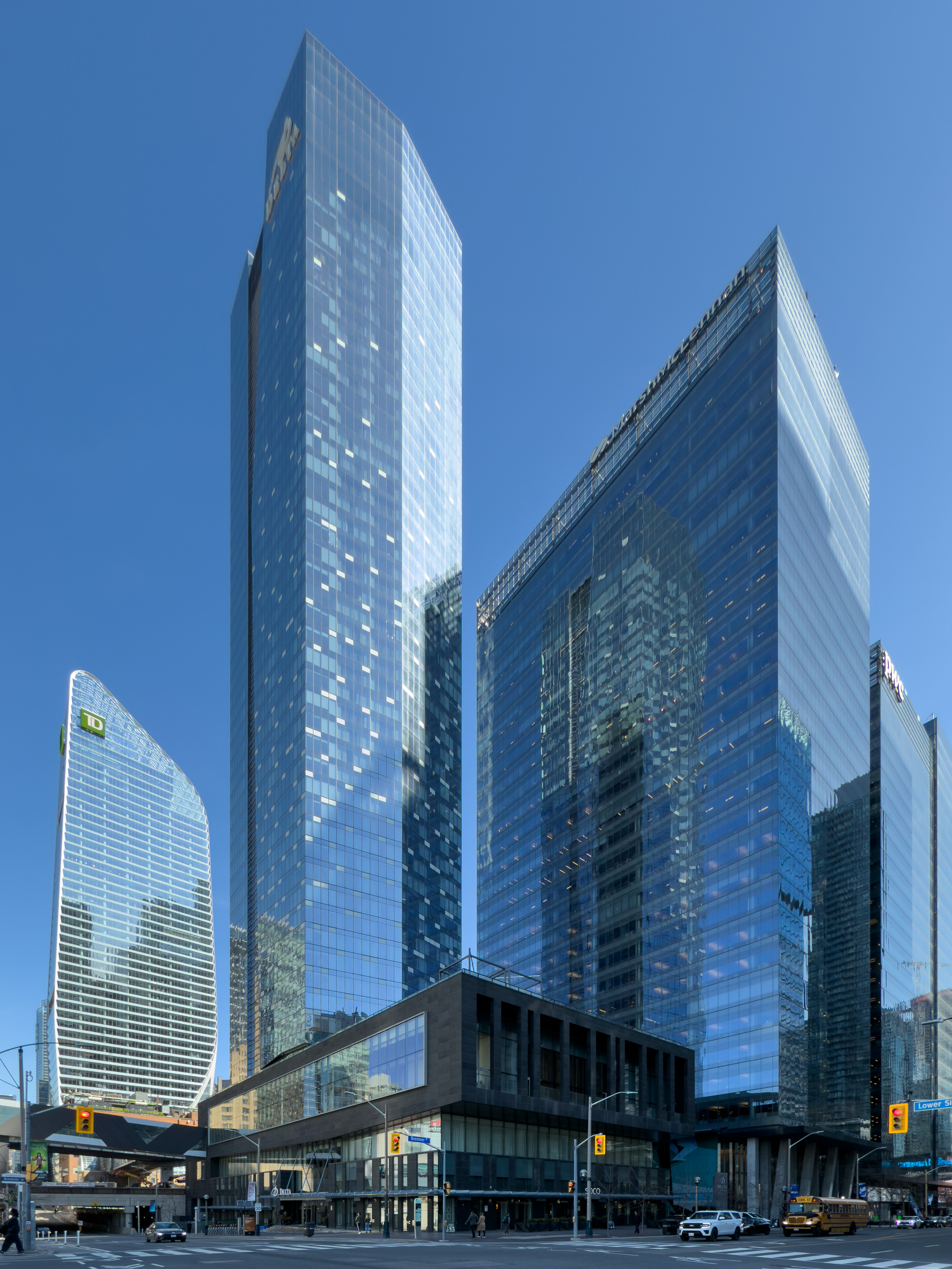
- The hotel viewed from Bremner Boulevard in Downtown Toronto

- Location within Toronto

General information
- Location: 75 Lower Simcoe Street; Toronto, Ontario; M5J 3A6
- Coordinates: 43°38′33″N 79°23′01″W
- Opened: November 27, 2014
- Owner: bcIMC Realty Corporation

Height
- Height: 524 feet (160 m)

Design and construction
- Architecture firm: Page and Steele/IBI Group Architects
- Developer: GWL Realty Advisors

Other information
- Number of rooms: 567

Website
- www.marriott.com/hotels

Delta Toronto Hotel is a hotel at 75 Lower Simcoe Street in Toronto, Ontario, Canada, that opened on November 27, 2014. It is the Toronto flagship hotel of Delta Hotels and is located in Downtown Toronto at the intersection of Lower Simcoe Street and Bremner Boulevard.

== History ==
The new hotel's beginning started with the Delta Chelsea's disaffiliation in 2012. On December 19, 2012, Delta Chelsea's owner, Great Eagle Holdings Ltd., announced that it would end its management agreement with Delta Hotels on July 1, 2013, and place the property under the control of its own subsidiary, Langham Hospitality Group.

It was reported that Great Eagle would not commit to renovations that Delta sought to upgrade the facility. Shortly after the disaffiliation of the Delta Chelsea, Delta began plans for a new hotel in the area known as the South Core and connected to the PATH network.

The new 524 feet (160 m) tower on Lower Simcoe Street was designed by Page and Steele/IBI Group Architects. Unlike the former location, the new location fulfilled the chain's desire of becoming an upscale premium hotel. The new Delta Toronto's 567 rooms are used for hotel guests only, with no condo units, but rather extended-stay units for long-term guests.

== Rivals ==
The hotel is one of several new high-end hotels built in Toronto and mostly located near one another:

- Ritz-Carlton Toronto - opened 2011
- The St. Regis Toronto - opened 2012
- Shangri-La Toronto - opened 2012
- Four Seasons Hotel and Residences Toronto - opened 2012

== See also ==
- Hotels in Toronto
