= Simcoe Street Tunnel =

Road tunnel in Toronto, Ontario, Canada

Coordinates: 43°38′37″N 79°23′04.5″W

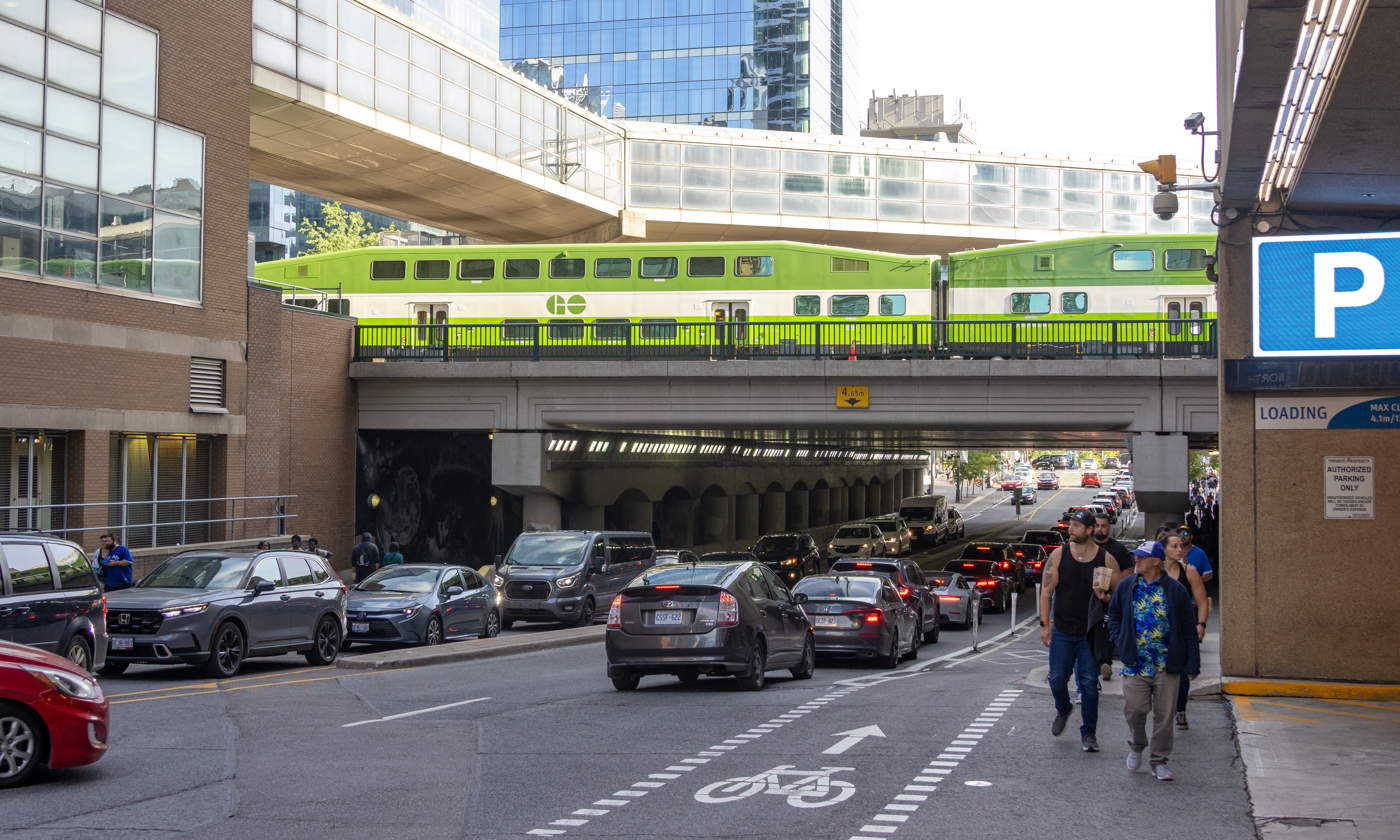
- Interactive map of Simcoe Street Tunnel

Overview
- Location: Canada
- Start: 2006

Operation
- Opened: 2009

The Simcoe Street tunnel is located between Front Street and Bremner Blvd. in Toronto, Ontario, Canada. This CA$40 million tunnel is situated in a densely urban site below the SkyWalk and in proximity to Toronto Union Station and the InterContinental Toronto Centre hotel. The tunnel roof structure is designed to carry all 16 pre-existing railway tracks. The ground structure provides one vehicle lane north bound and two lanes south bound, one bicycle lane and one extra wide pedestrian sidewalk on each side of the tunnel.

The Simcoe Street tunnel was officially opened on September 22, 2009 by Councillor Adam Vaughan.

== Construction ==
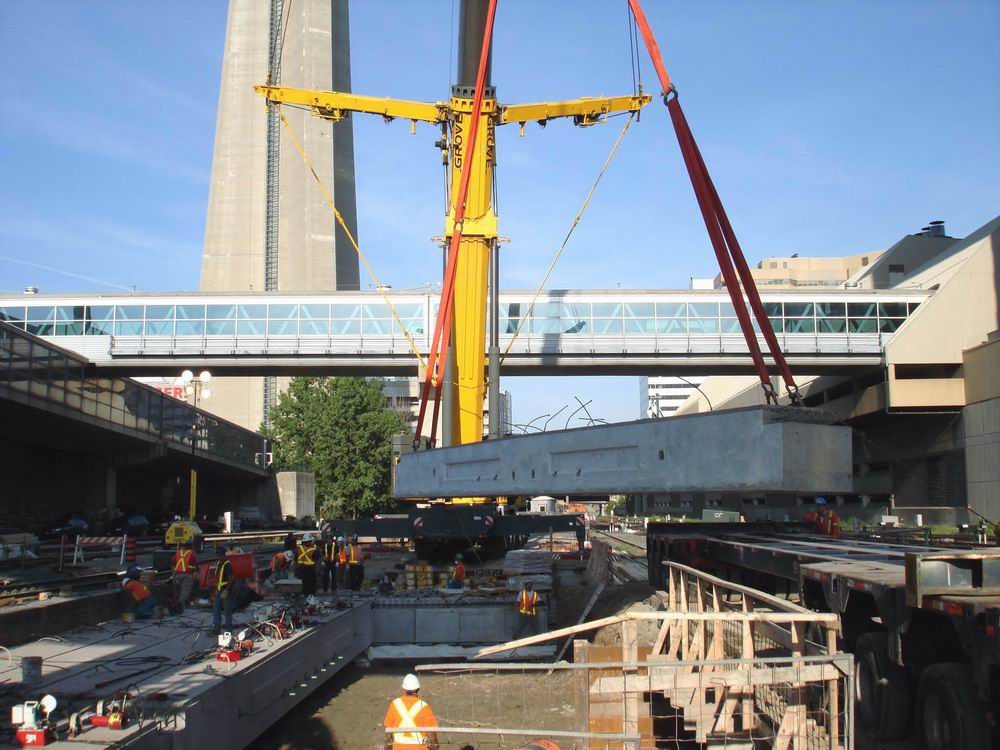
The Simcoe Street Tunnel while it was under construction.

Construction of the tunnel began in late 2006 and was carried out in stages. Thin soil cover prohibited the use of bored tunnel and hacked tunnel methods. For each stage the substructure was first constructed within the excavated trenches to the underside of the temporary trestles.

A key component in building the tunnel was the readily available supply of precast deck segments nearby. The project required 1.6 kilometres of girders so Soncin, who was contracted by Fairmont Developments to construct the extension of Simcoe Street, built a precast facility on site. A total of 153 girders were produced in three months. Fifty-one girders were post tensioned and 102 girders were normally reinforced.

Design and construction of the tunnel posed significant challenges as the Union Station corridor has the highest train volume for a single terminus location in North America. It was necessary to maintain the normal operation schedule of the railway corridor during construction. In order to not cause any disruption to the operation of 16 tracks, construction was scheduled during train work blocks. Morrison Hershfield the project managers, designers, contract administrators and site engineers, worked with the railway companies including Via Rail, Canadian National Railway, Amtrak and GO Transit to ensure the services of 177 daily scheduled trains that passed over the tunnel were maintained. Some trains were temporarily rerouted to adjacent tracks.

== Environmental and social impacts ==
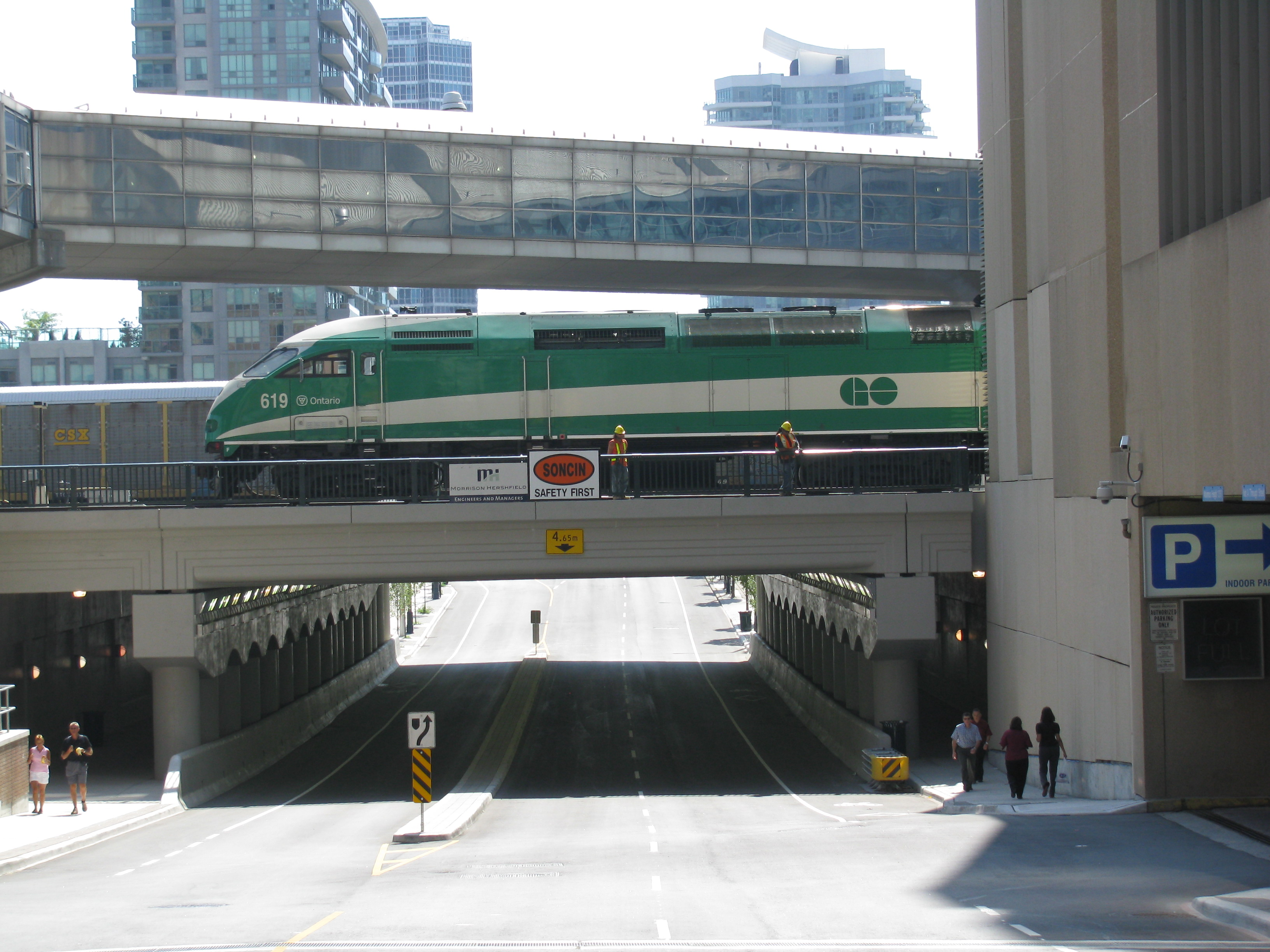
A GO Transit train passing over the Simcoe Tunnel.

To help protect the environment during construction of the tunnel a Quality Management Plan was set in place. This plan ensured all waste materials were disposed of according to government regulations. Disposal techniques were also monitored for compliance.

By not affecting the existing rail service of the 177 trains per day using the corridor, a risk of loss of ridership was removed that could have occurred in relation to potential delays. Long and short distance travellers were continuously able to get to their destinations as planned, which helped to avoid an increase in the use of personal vehicles. A lasting environmental impact after construction is the improved access to the Lake Ontario waterfront within the City of Toronto. The original rail corridor was a major physical barrier between the downtown and the lakefront where continuous residential, recreational and business developments are occurring. The tunnel reduces the length of vehicular travel time and associated carbon emissions, and the new ease of access promotes carbon-free travel, i.e., bicycling and walking.

Former Mayor of Toronto, David Miller was quoted saying “The Simcoe Street underpass will improve downtown traffic flow and help provide important services to future development on the lands south of Union Station. But most importantly, the project will improve access to our waterfront for all Torontonians."

According to the city report published in 2014, the underpass was flooded 5 times between 2010 and 2013.

== See also ==
- Lower Simcoe Street underpass murals
- Toronto Waterfront
