= The Chelsea Inn =

Coordinates: 39.353134°N 74.447735°W

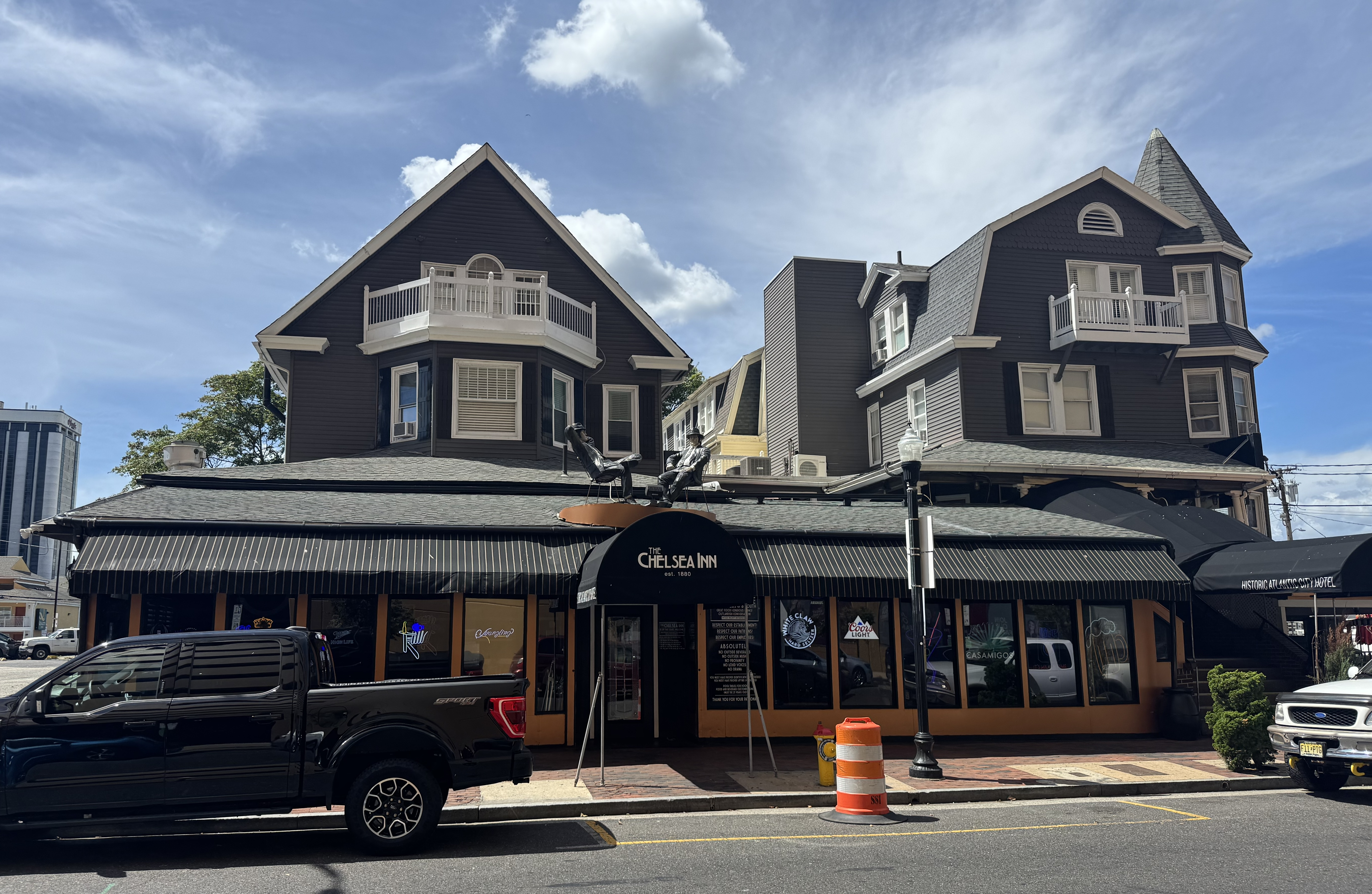
- Interactive map of The Chelsea Inn

Restaurant information
- Established: 1858
- Owner: N/A
- Previous owner: N/A
- Head chef: N/A
- Food type: Irish Pub
- Dress code: Black
- Rating: 3.4
- Location: 8 S Morris Ave, Atlantic City, New Jersey, 08401, United States
- Seating capacity: 20
- Reservations: 20
- Other locations: 0
- Website: www.thechelseainn.com

The Chelsea Inn is a historic hotel and pub, founded in 1858 in Atlantic City, New Jersey. The structure has been a part of the Atlantic City's landscape since 1880. The building was formerly Grossman's Kosher Hotel.

== Erroneous closing report ==
A post by the Inn's Facebook page reported that the establishment closed abruptly in July 2017, however those initial reports were erroneous. A spokesperson for the Inn, said that only the pub has been closed. The hotel and a separate food service remain operational.
