= Chelsea Hotel, Toronto =

Hotel in Toronto, Ontario

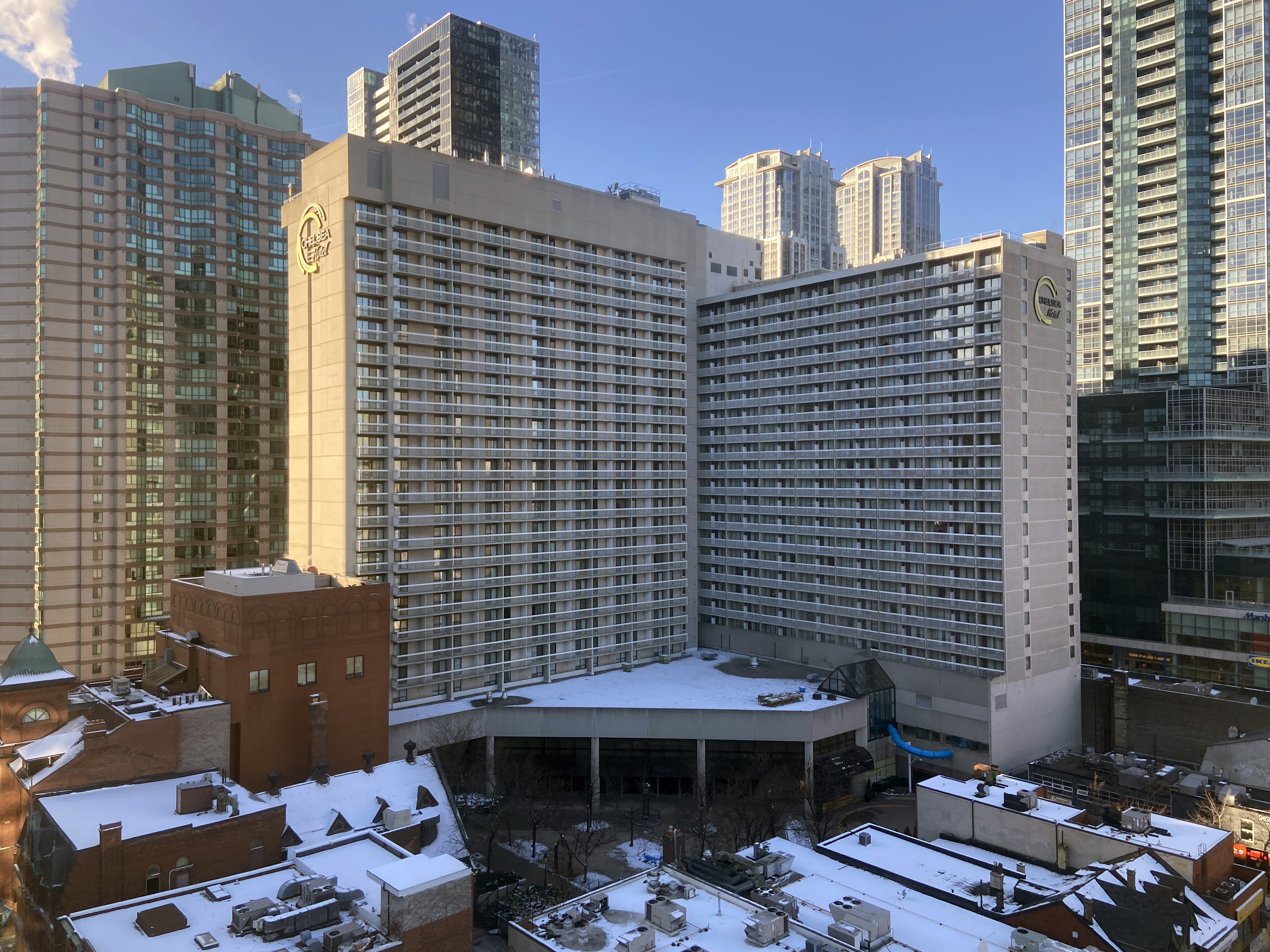

General information
- Location: 22 Elm Street, Toronto, ON M5G 1G7
- Coordinates: 43°39′31″N 79°22′59″W
- Opened: October 15, 1975
- Owner: Great Eagle Holdings
- Operator: Langham Hospitality Group

Technical details
- Floor count: 26

Design and construction
- Architects: Crang and Boake

Other information
- Number of rooms: 1,590
- Number of restaurants: 3

Website
- chelseatoronto.com

The Chelsea Hotel, Toronto is the largest hotel in Canada, located at 22 Elm Street in Toronto, Ontario. The 24 floor, 83.72 metres (274.7 ft) hotel contains 1,590 guest rooms and suites, with 5 basements and 18 elevators.

== History ==
The structure originally received funding from the Canada Mortgage and Housing Corporation to be constructed as a student housing cooperative and then was planned as a residential condominium building. However, it eventually opened as a hotel on October 15, 1975, operated by Delta Hotels as Delta's Chelsea Inn. The hotel was purchased in 1996 by Great Eagle Holdings of Hong Kong.

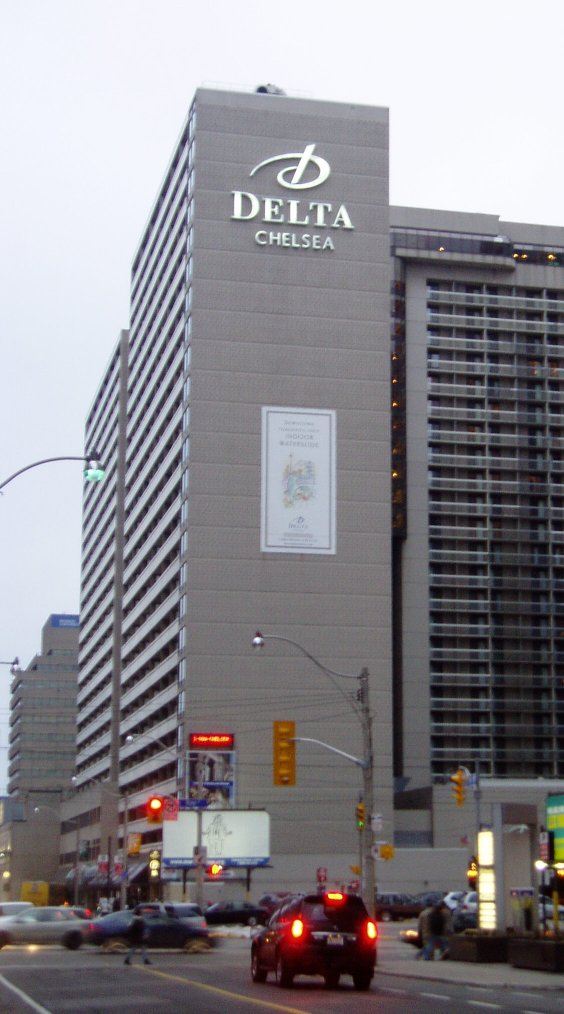
The Delta Chelsea Hotel in 2005

On December 19, 2012, Great Eagle Holdings announced it would end its management agreement with Delta Hotels on July 1, 2013, and place the property, by then known as Delta Chelsea Toronto, under the control of its subsidiary, Langham Hospitality Group in their Eaton Hotels division, which has since been rebranded as Eaton Workshop Hotels. It was reported that Great Eagle Holdings would not commit to renovations that Delta sought in order to upgrade the hotel. Ken Greene, president and CEO of Delta Hotels, stated that "It was a tough decision to part ways", adding, "This is symbolic of the repositioning that Delta is going through. It definitely shows that we are very serious about becoming the leading four-star brand." Delta had announced that it was building a new flagship hotel (the Delta Toronto Hotel) in Toronto's South Core district as part of a development led by its parent company at the time, the British Columbia Investment Management Corporation.

The hotel changed its name to the Eaton Chelsea on July 1, 2013.

In 2016, although still part of Langham Hospitality Group, the hotel was removed from the Eaton Brand and renamed Chelsea Hotel Toronto.

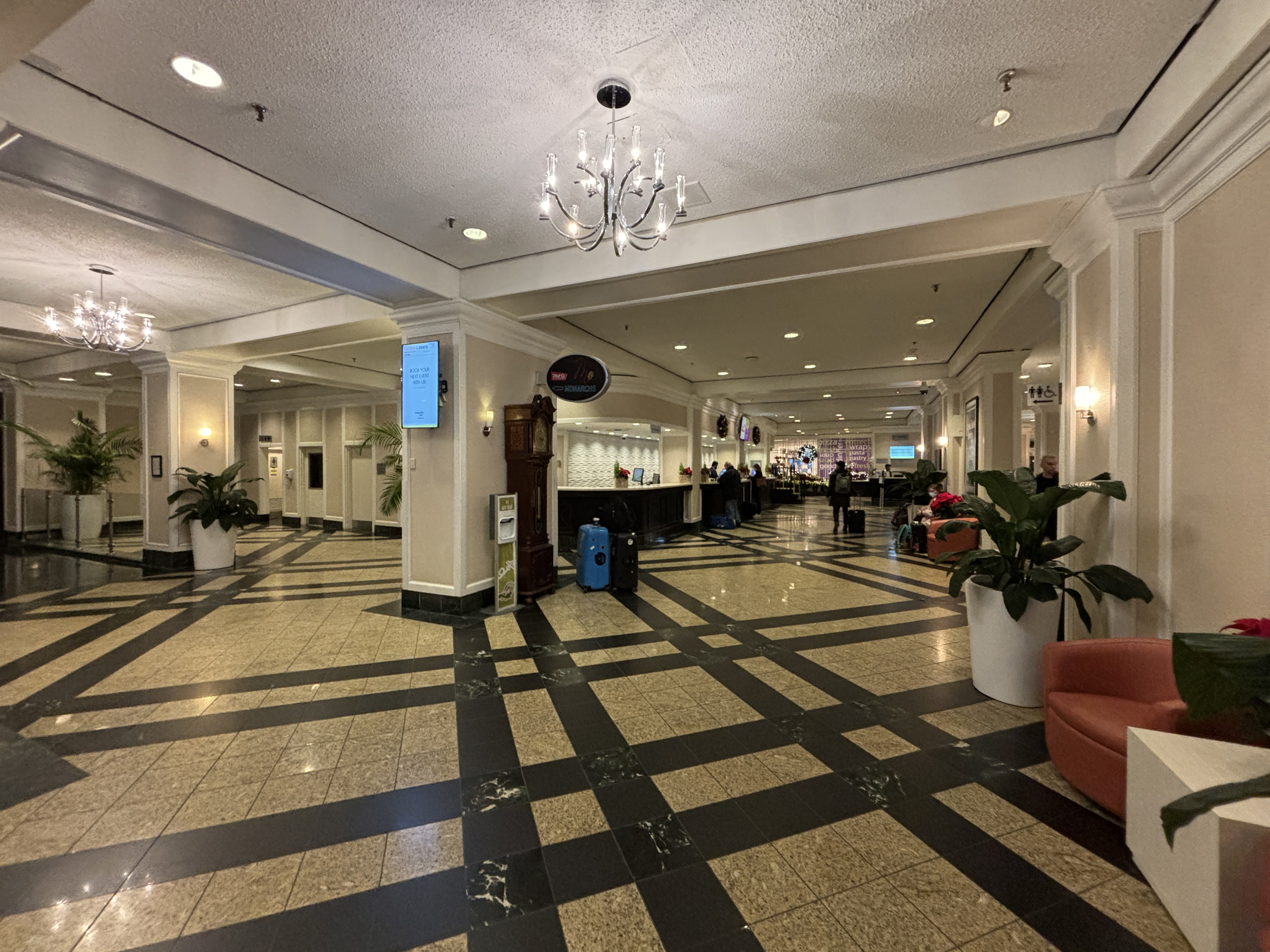
Hotel Lobby

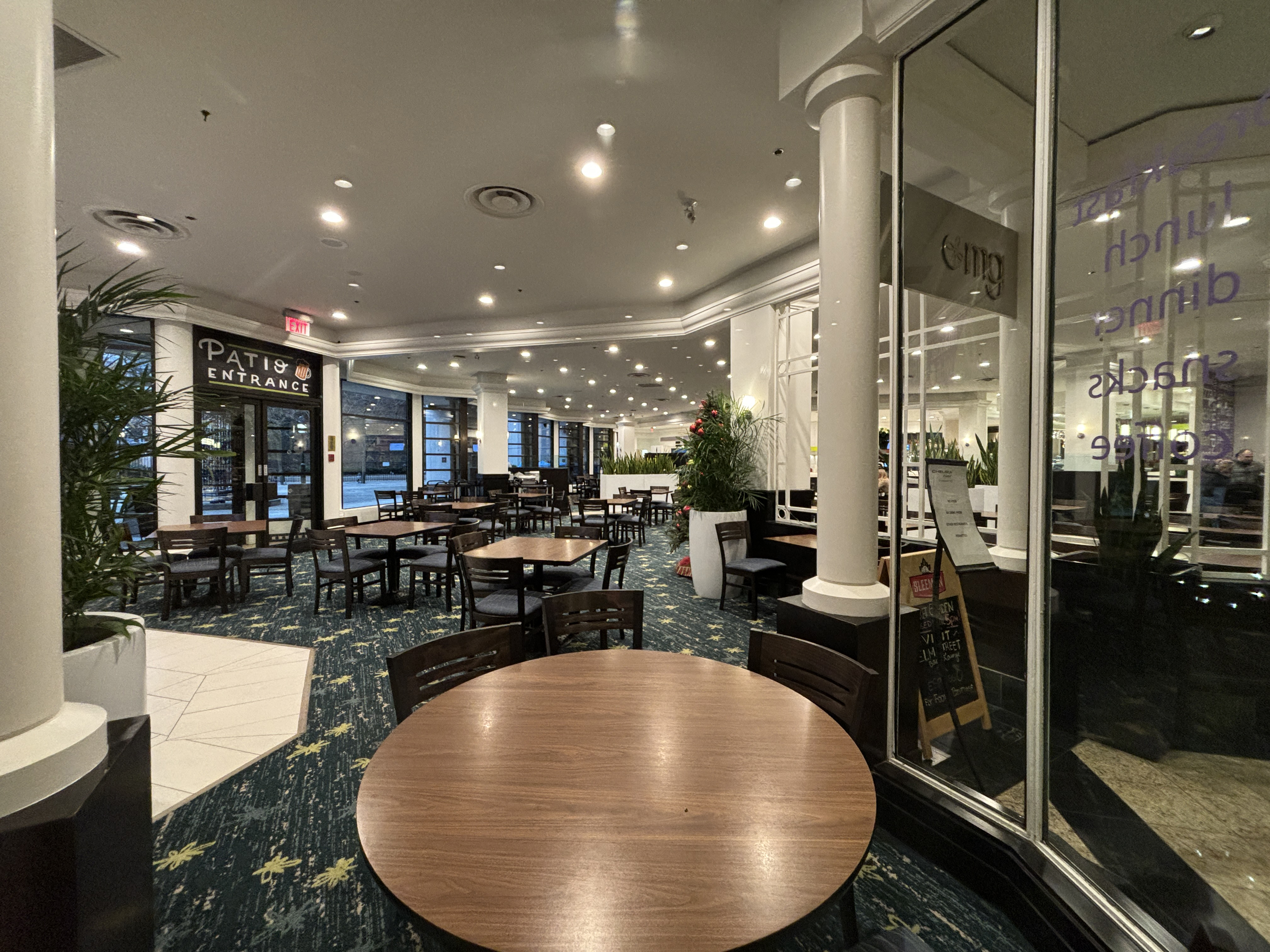
Hotel Restaurant

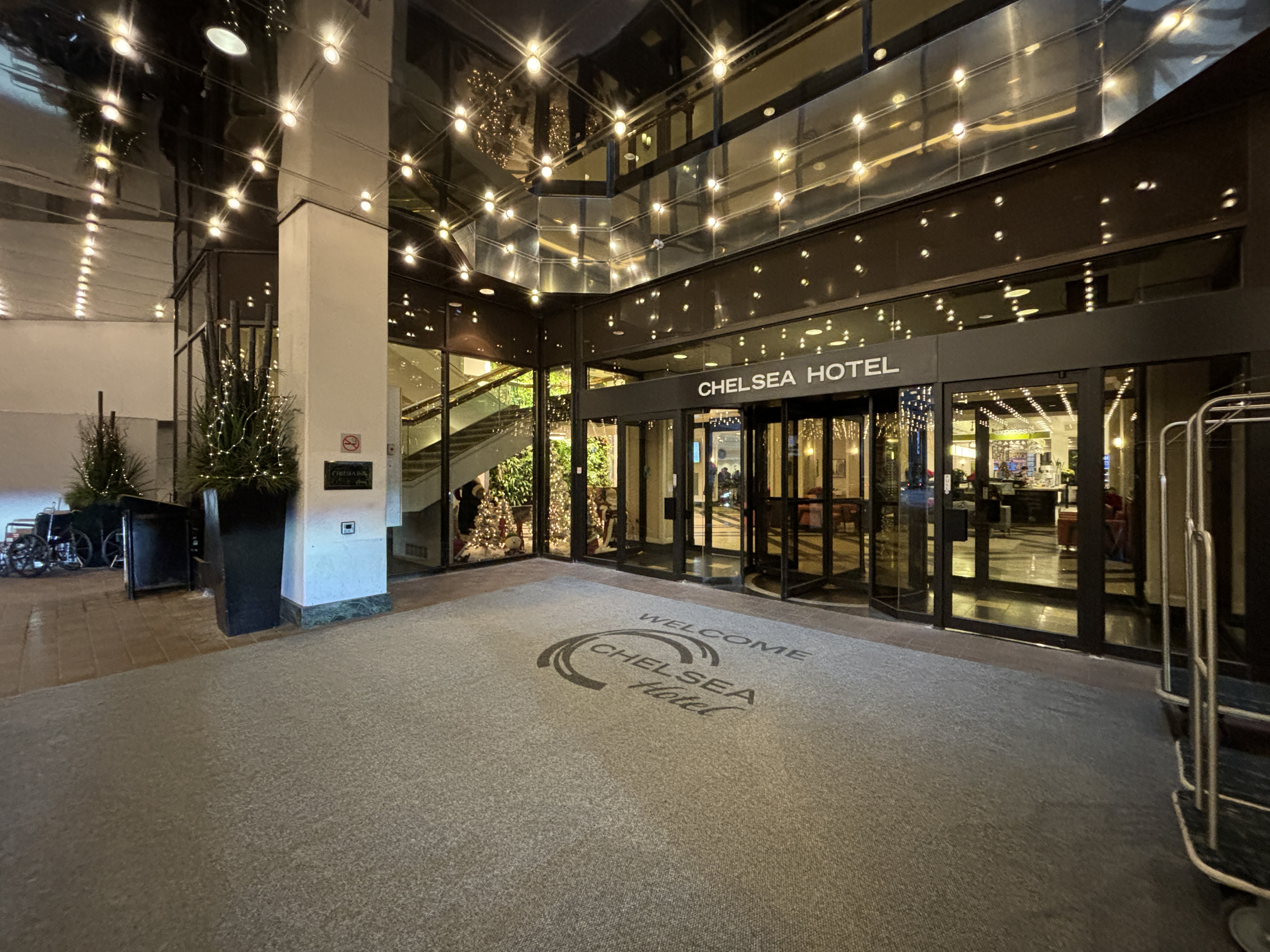
Drop off area entrance
