= A New Start (Degrassi High) =

- Degrassi High episodes
- A CBC promotional poster for A New Start
- Episode nos.: Season 1 Episodes 1-2
- Directed by: Kit Hood
- Written by: Yan Moore
- Cinematography by: Phillip Earnshaw
- Editing by: Robert de Lint
- Production code: 101-102
- Original air date: November 6, 1989

Episode chronology
← Previous —	Next → "Breaking Up Is Hard To Do"

"A New Start" is the two-part premiere episode of the Canadian teen drama series Degrassi High. It aired on CBC in its hour-long form on 6 November 1989 and on PBS in the United States on 13 January 1990. The episode was written by Yan Moore and directed by Kit Hood. It is the first of three episodes of Degrassi that depict abortion, followed by 2003's "Accidents Will Happen" from Degrassi: The Next Generation and 2017's "#IRegretNothing" from Degrassi: Next Class.

In the episode, which revisits the cast of Degrassi Junior High as they begin high school, Erica Farrell (Angela Deiseach) discovers she is pregnant following a summer romance and contemplates an abortion and her anti-abortion twin sister Heather (Maureen Deiseach) becomes torn on supporting her. In the sub-plot, Joey Jeremiah (Pat Mastroianni), Archie "Snake" Simpson (Stefan Brogren) and Derek "Wheels" Wheeler (Neil Hope) are hazed one-by-one by Joey's former enemy Dwayne Myers (Darrin Brown) and his cronies. The episode was made in reaction to the abortion debate of the late 1980s. The writers of Degrassi had thought of making an episode on abortion as early as Degrassi Junior High but were unsure about it due to the polarisation around the topic. Angela Deiseach extensively prepared for the episode, including visiting a real abortion clinic where she was heckled and called a "whore".

The episode aired to a largely positive reception for its even-handed and direct portrayal of the abortion debate and Angela Deiseach's performance as Erica was singled out for praise by some critics. Several newspapers called Degrassi High "gutsy" in tackling the subject matter and not "copping out" and the episode generated commentary in the Canadian media. However, in the United States, PBS removed the final scene in which Erica and Heather fight through a crowd of anti-abortion picketers; a decision which drew pushback from the showrunners and led to Hood's name being removed from the credits at his request.

== Plot ==
=== Part one ===
While getting prepared for their first day at Degrassi High School, Erica Farrell (Angela Deiseach) suddenly becomes sick and runs into a bathroom to vomit as her sister Heather (Maureen Deiseach) expresses her excitement at the new school. At Degrassi High, many of the students from junior high school reunite with each other. As Erica and Heather approach the school, they are met by Christine "Spike" Nelson (Amanda Stepto) and Liz O'Rourke (Cathy Keenan), the former of who is now taking her daughter Emma to a daycare nearby the high school. Although Heather is excited to see them, Erica looks on, emotionless. In school, Grade 10 students Dwayne Myers (Darrin Brown) and his friends Tabi (Michelle Johnson-Murray) and Nick (George Chaker) express their dismay at the influx of the younger students and they decide that "initiation" should be brought back "unofficially". Erica and Heather meet up with Lucy Fernandez (Anais Granofsky) and L.D. (Amanda Cook), where Heather tells them that Erica had a romance over the summer; a camp counselor named Jason. Erica, not amused, says Jason was a jerk and leaves. Heather explains that the two had a fight and broke up before they left the camp and then tells them that Erica lost her virginity to him, despite having only known him for two months. After Joey, Snake and Wheels meet their junior high teacher Ms. Avery (Michelle Goodeve), Dwayne bumps into Joey and then blames him, Snake and Wheels for burning down the school and explains his plans to initiate the three of them despite the school having banned initiation. After noticing Erica's behavior at school, she consoles her back at home and the two decide to buy a pregnancy test. Back at school, Snake is targeted in the initiation He later returns to Joey and Wheels covered in white powder as Joey and Wheels run away. As the twins wait for the pregnancy tests, Erica suggests having an abortion, which Heather disagrees with, telling her abortion is wrong. The results come back and she tests negative. Later at school, Erica says her period is still late and decides to buy another pregnancy test which Heather agrees with. In the halls, Wheels is next for initiation and returns to Joey and Snake in the cafeteria covered in shaving cream. Snake and Wheels tease Joey, who is next. Back at home, Erica awaits her test results.

=== Part two ===
Her results return and Heather jokes she can finally use the washroom. When she is out of sight, Erica appears to be stunned, implying that the test came back positive. Back at the school, Erica and Heather meet Spike and Liz again. Erica asks Spike how horrible it was being pregnant, which Heather feels is an offhand question. Spike explains that she felt like an outcast and had no social life but that she still loved Emma. In communications class, Erica sparks a class debate about abortion, which Spike refuses to participate in, feeling that because it was wrong for her, it did not mean it was wrong in general. Later on, Erica goes to an abortion clinic, where she is swarmed by anti-abortion protesters. She is led inside the clinic by a worker, who explains the procedure to her. Joey continues to hide from the initiation. At home, Erica reveals she lied to Heather about the results of the second test, that she had a third done at the clinic and that she's made an appointment for an abortion. Heather vehemently disagrees and despite Erica pleading her to come with her, a panicked Heather refuses. Joey is later caught and undergoes initiation; while he is being dragged up a ramp while rolling a banana under his nose, the three leave, just as Joey is approached by Mr. Raditch (Dan Woods), who tells Jeremiah that he is the new vice principal, and takes him to his office for a "little chat". After class, Heather pulls Spike aside and asks her if she'd ever thought about having an abortion. Spike says that she did and that she felt it was wrong to have one but clarifies that it was her choice and Erica (who Heather doesn't name) feels it is right for her. Spike tells Heather: "Y'know, it's great to have high ideals and stuff but when you're in that situation, right and wrong, they can get really complicated." Back at the clinic, protesters are still circling outside. This time, Heather is with Erica and the two go together, where they are swarmed (and in Erica's case the second time) by the protesters. As they make it to the top of the stairs, one protester holds up a plastic fetus and the two are led inside by the woman.

== Cast ==
Credited in order of original broadcast:

- Angela Deiseach as Erica Farrell
- Maureen Deiseach as Heather Farrell
- Stefan Brogren as Archie "Snake" Simpson
- Neil Hope as Derek "Wheels" Wheeler
- Pat Mastroianni as Joey Jeremiah
- Anais Granofsky as Lucy Fernandez
- Amanda Cook as LD
- Irene Courakos as Alexa Pappadopoulos
- Michael Carry as Simon Dexter
- Amanda Stepto as Christine "Spike" Nelson
- Cathy Keenan as Liz O'Rourke
- Siluck Saysanasy as Yick Yu
- Duncan Waugh as Arthur Kobalewscuy
- Darrin Brown as Dwayne Myers
- George Chaker as Nick
- Michele Johnson-Murray as Tabi
- Stacie Mistysyn as Caitlin Ryan
- Kyra Levy as Maya
- David Armin-Parcells as Claude Tanner
- John Ioannou as Alex
- Rebecca Haines as Kathleen Mead
- Sara Ballingall as Melanie Brodie
- Dayo Ade as BLT
- Maureen McKay as Michelle Accette
- Keith White as Tim O'Connor
- Carina Annis as Lois
- Niville Diggs as Grace
- Christopher Charlesworth as Scooter
- Kirsten Bourne as Tessa Campanelli
- Krista Houston as Joanne
- Adam David as Mr. Walfish
- Michelle Goodeve as Ms. Avery
- Dan Woods as Mr. Raditch
- Samantha Morrison as Baby Emma
- Meita Winkler as Councillor
- Susan Hart as Receptionist

== Production and broadcast ==
Prior to "A New Start", Degrassi's writers had been reluctant to deal with abortion due to the polarisation surrounding it. An episode on abortion had been considered as early as Christine "Spike" Nelson's pregnancy in Degrassi Junior High, but head writer Yan Moore feared the reaction to such a storyline and felt that "there was no way we could possibly do it". As the cast matured and the producers had done further research, Moore changed his mind, and creators Linda Schuyler and Kit Hood felt that the actors were emotionally mature enough to handle the topic. They selected twin sisters Erica and Heather Farrell (Angela and Maureen Deiseach), as it was felt that they would be perfect for portraying both sides of the debate.

Schuyler felt it was appropriate to deal with abortion at the beginning of the season as they could explore the effects of the situation throughout the subsequent episodes; in 1989, she told the Toronto Star; "The issue is not over with in this show. There are three or four subplots which show the angst isn't over with. You just can't put something like this at the end of your season - well, you could but I don't think it would be responsible. The issue doesn't stop and start in an hour." During the pre-production acting workshops, held before the filming of each season, the actors were instructed to read, with conviction, monologues espousing views on both sides of the abortion debate. Several actors shared the opposite viewpoint from the provided script; for instance, Cathy Keenan, who played the anti-abortion Liz O'Rourke, was pro-choice in real life, with Schuyler later commenting it was a "real stretch" for the actress. The polarisation was such that some actors refused to read what had been written for them. Catherine Dunphy called the tension in the room during the initial readthrough "palpable".

Angela Deiseach, whose character Erica has the abortion, spent weeks extensively preparing for her role in the episode. She watched a video about a teenage girl who chose abortion, which made her cry, discussed the subject at length with Maureen, and eventually asked to visit an abortion clinic alone. There, she was recognized from the show and heckled by anti-abortion protesters. At the clinic, Deiseach attended a counseling session undercover. Afterwards, Deiseach went into an elevator, where she was called a "whore" by a man. Principal photography of "A New Start" took place in the spring of 1989 and wrapped on 24 May. The Deiseach twins recalled later that the filming of the scene in which Erica has to face her pregnancy reduced Kit Hood and everybody in the room to tears.

"A New Start" premiered in its hour-long form on CBC Television in Canada at 8:30pm, the same time slot as its predecessor, on 6 November 1989, pre-empting the American sitcom Designing Women. In Australia, the first part premiered at 5:30pm on 15 May 1991, on ABC-TV's The Afternoon Show, a day after Degrassi Junior High's series finale, "Bye-Bye, Junior High", with the second part airing the day later. Reportedly, to avoid pre-broadcast controversy, the CBC asked the media not to reveal much details of the episode, including the outcome of the storyline.

== Reception and legacy ==
The episode was generally acclaimed by critics upon its original broadcast, with praise going to its even-handed and nuanced portrayal of the abortion debate. Despite their fears of a major backlash towards the episode from anti-abortion groups, negative reception was minimal; Linda Schuyler said in 1990 that they "maybe had five negative letters on the abortion show". Yan Moore remarked in 2012 that they only received "the occasional postcard" from a "religious guy [..] telling us we were all going to hell in a handbasket." Bob Remington, writing for the Edmonton Journal, felt the episode handled the issue of abortion responsibly, portrayed every view point on the subject, and unlike other television series which addressed the same issue, there was no "miscarriage cop-out". Lynne Heffley of the Los Angeles Times declared that the episode still proved Degrassi as being one of the "most gutsiest shows on television".

Writing for The Toronto Star, Antonia Zerbisias acclaimed the episode, asserting that it was "a gutsy show, particularly in the light of the current political and emotional climate [of the 1980s]", and singled out the exploration of both sides of the abortion topic. Furthermore, she quipped that if the show was an American prime time show, "the whole thing would turn out to be a hilarious mix-up. We'd have lots of eye-rolling, sophomoric one-liners about burgeoning bellies and then ooops! Turns out the smart alec kid brother merely murdered the bunny for a school science project." Ian Warden of The Canberra Times particularly praised actress Angela Deiseach, who he felt "exquisitely and touchingly" portrayed Erica, and suggested that the Australian Broadcasting Corporation sell video tapes of the show in their stores, as "no high school, and perhaps no home with pubescent children rattling around it, should be without them". Angela Deiseach's performance was also noted by Catherine Dunphy of the Toronto Star, who stated that when "Erica breaks down and weeps - really weeps; she is gasping for breath and her shoulders shake - it is an electric jolt. Her pain burns through even the cool medium of television."

A mixed review came from The Province's Lee Bacchus. While agreeing that the episode continued to demonstrate the show's willingness to tackle contentious social issues, Bacchus felt that it simplified the issue of abortion to "the bumper-sticker level of righteous moralism" and "lofty platitudes". On November 11, 1989, Starweek (the entertainment section of the Toronto Star) ran a piece in which two individuals, one anti-abortion and one pro-choice, offered their opinion on the episode. The anti-abortion viewer stated Degrassi High was "fundamentally dishonest" in its portrayal of abortion, and that Erica "has no choice at all since she is totally unwilling or unable to look her situation squarely in the face". Meanwhile, the pro-choice viewer felt the episode was Degrassi's best, "poignantly presented" the emotional decisions involved and did not simplify the complexities of abortion, and that by doing so, it "did a service to compassion and tolerance".

Reader's Digest Canada's Brett Walther ranked the episode and its storyline on his list of "10 Times Degrassi High Was the Best Thing on Television". Like contemporary critics, Walther shared the sentiment that the abortion plotline was "sensitively and intelligently handled", and that the episode still felt "relevant more than three decades on". Walther also singled out a quote from Spike: "It's great to have, you know, high ideals and stuff, but when you're in that situation, right and wrong—they can get really complicated.", as being "fantastic" and "could just as easily serve as the series' manifesto". He concluded that the episode didn't have a happy ending, but rather the moral of the story being that "most people are inherently decent, doing the best they can in a world that's often unfair."

== PBS scene edit controversy ==
An anti-abortion protester holds a plastic fetus up towards Erica and Heather. This scene was controversially cut from the PBS broadcast in the United States.

"A New Start" was the subject of a minor spat between Degrassi High's producers and PBS when the episode made its United States debut on the network in January 1990. The final scene, in which Erica and Heather are accosted by anti-abortion picketers as they make their way up to the clinic, was removed, with the episode instead ending on a shot of the twins looking on before they do so. Kate Taylor of WGBH, who was also involved in the series' production, stated that the choice to cut the scenes was an "esthetic decision", that had been undertaken to create a "more powerful, more poignant" ending to the story. This change was condemned by director and series co-creator Kit Hood, who accused Kate Taylor of bringing a "personal bias" into the decision. Hood also remarked that they had given the episode "an American ending, happy, safe but incomplete..." In protest, he requested his name be taken out of the credits of the PBS version.

Linda Schuyler noted that the removed portion included a shot of a picketer holding up a plastic fetus, something that was to be recalled in a later episode. Edmonton Journal's Bob Remington defended PBS's decision, arguing that it did not avoid the issue "or take the easy way out" as had been insinuated, and that the producers were overreacting over something arguably minor. Ivan Fecan, then the programming chief for the CBC and a supporter of Degrassi, stated that the network had no hesitations in showing the unedited episode, stating: "If you do something responsibly and well, it is fine and right to show it". He also opined that the United States did not give Degrassi the respect it deserved and that they "have no idea of what a strong show they are missing".

== See also ==
- "It's Late", a similar episode from Degrassi Junior High involving teen pregnancy.
- "Accidents Will Happen", a similar episode from Degrassi: The Next Generation involving teen pregnancy that was not aired in the United States until three years later.
