= List of Degrassi: Next Class episodes =

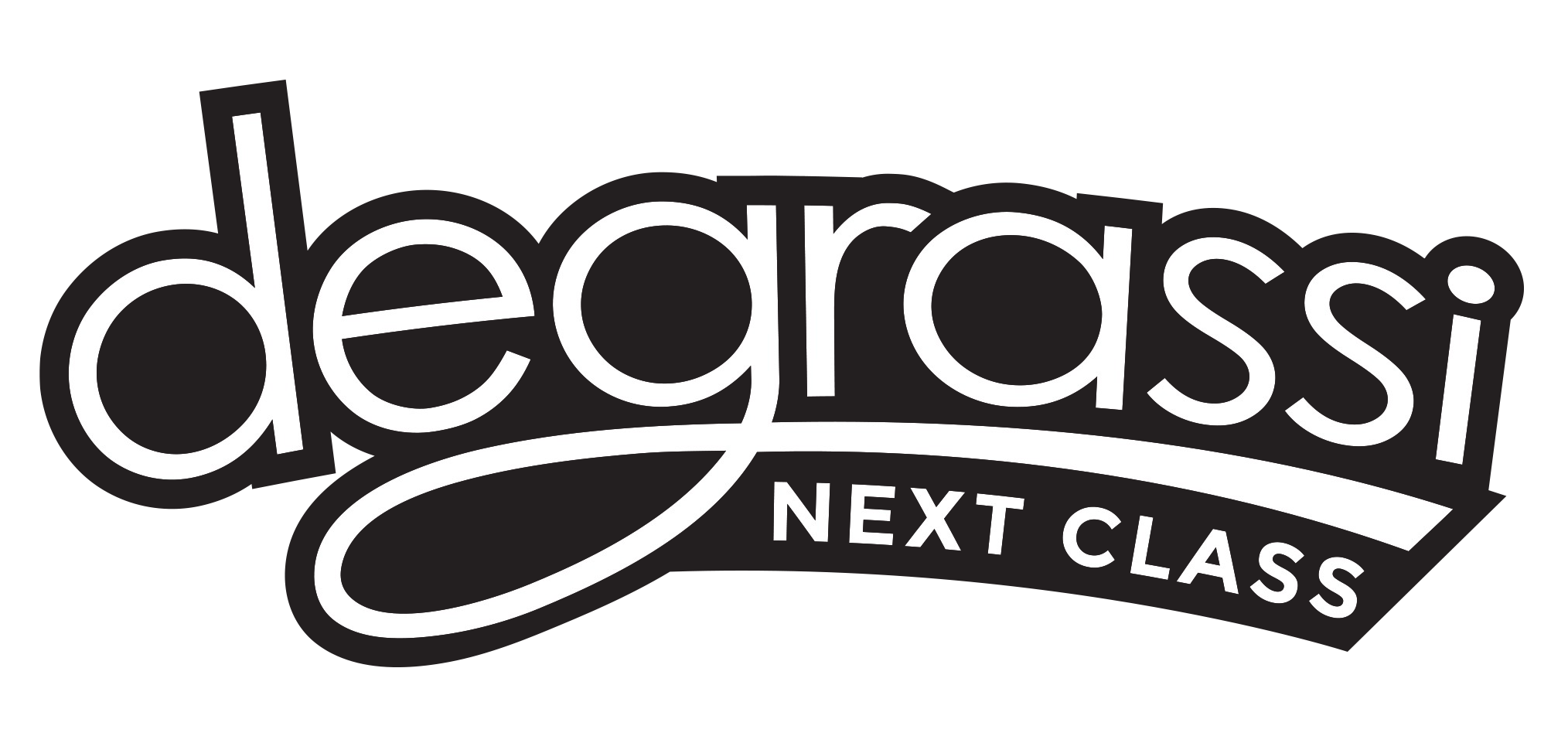

Degrassi: Next Class is a Canadian teen drama television series created by Linda Schuyler, Yan Moore, Stephen Stohn, Sarah Glinski and Matt Huether. Premiering in January 2016, the series streams on Netflix internationally and is broadcast on Family Channel's teen block, F2N, in Canada. It is the fifth series set in the fictional Degrassi universe created by Schuyler and Kit Hood in 1979 and the direct sequel series to Degrassi: The Next Generation. Like its predecessors, Degrassi: Next Class follows a group of students from Degrassi Community School, a fictional school in Toronto, Ontario, and depicts some of the typical issues and challenges common to a teenager's life. The series producers' consider Next Class's first season to be the fifteenth of The Next Generation, but is nonetheless listed as "season one" on Netflix.

The series was renewed for a third and fourth season to contain 10 episodes each. Filming began May 16, 2016 for both seasons. Both were released in 2017.

As of June 30, 2017, 40 episodes of Degrassi: Next Class have aired, concluding the fourth season.

== Series overview ==
Season	Episodes	Originally released (Canada)		Netflix release dates (U.S.)
Season	Episodes	First released	Last released	Netflix release dates (U.S.)
1	10	January 4, 2016	January 15, 2016	January 15, 2016
2	10	July 19, 2016	September 20, 2016	July 22, 2016
3	10	January 9, 2017	January 20, 2017	January 6, 2017
4	10	July 3, 2017 (Note: The fourth season was released on the Family Channel app to stream on June 30, 2017, four days before its debut on the channel.)	July 14, 2017	July 7, 2017

== Episodes ==
=== Season 1 (2016) ===
No. overall	No. in season	Title	Directed by	Written by	Canadian airdate	Netflix Release	Prod. code
1	1	"#BootyCall"	Stefan Brogren	Courtney Jane Walker	January 4, 2016	January 15, 2016	101
2	2	"#NoFilter"	Stefan Brogren	Courtney Jane Walker	January 5, 2016	January 15, 2016	102
3	3	"#YesMeansYes"	Stefan Brogren	Alejandro Alcoba	January 6, 2016	January 15, 2016	103
4	4	"#NotOkay"	Stefan Brogren	Alejandro Alcoba	January 7, 2016	January 15, 2016	104
5	5	"#ButThatsNoneOfMyBusiness"	Eleanor Lindo	Matt Huether	January 8, 2016	January 15, 2016	105
6	6	"#NotAllMen"	Eleanor Lindo	Matt Huether	January 11, 2016	January 15, 2016	106
7	7	"#ThisCouldBeUsButYouPlayin"	Eleanor Lindo	Sarah Glinski	January 12, 2016	January 15, 2016	107
8	8	"#TeamFollowBack"	Eleanor Lindo	Ian MacIntyre	January 13, 2016	January 15, 2016	108
9	9	"#SinceWeBeinHonest"	Stefan Brogren	Alejandro Alcoba	January 14, 2016	January 15, 2016	109
10	10	"#SorryNotSorry"	Stefan Brogren	Sarah Glinski	January 15, 2016	January 15, 2016	110

=== Season 2 (2016) ===
No. overall	No. in season	Title	Directed by	Written by	Canadian airdate	Netflix Release	Prod. code
11	1	"#SquadGoals"	Stefan Brogren	Courtney Jane Walker	July 19, 2016	July 22, 2016	201
12	2	"#TurntUp"	Stefan Brogren	Courtney Jane Walker	July 26, 2016	July 22, 2016	202
13	3	"#CheckYourPrivilege"	Phil Earnshaw	Cole Bastedo	August 2, 2016	July 22, 2016	203
14	4	"#BuyMePizza"	Phil Earnshaw	Alejandro Alcoba & Ian MacIntyre	August 9, 2016	July 22, 2016	204
15	5	"#ThrowBackThursday"	Phil Earnshaw	Matt Huether	August 16, 2016	July 22, 2016	205
16	6	"#ToMyFutureSelf"	Phil Earnshaw	Matt Huether	August 23, 2016	July 22, 2016	206
17	7	"#ThatAwkwardMomentWhen"	Rt!	Courtney Jane Walker	August 30, 2016	July 22, 2016	207
18	8	"#RiseAndGrind"	Rt!	Matt Huether	September 6, 2016	July 22, 2016	208
19	9	"#TheseAreMyConfessions"	Rt!	Sarah Glinski	September 13, 2016	July 22, 2016	209
20	10	"#OMFG"	Rt!	Sarah Glinski	September 20, 2016	July 22, 2016	210

=== Season 3 (2017) ===
No. overall	No. in season	Title	Directed by	Written by	Original release date	Netflix Release	Prod. code
21	1	"#BreakTheInternet"	Stefan Brogren	Matt Huether	January 9, 2017	January 6, 2017	301
22	2	"#IWokeUpLikeThis"	Stefan Brogren	Matt Huether	January 10, 2017	January 6, 2017	302
23	3	"#WorstGiftEver"	Stefan Brogren	Alejandro Alcoba	January 11, 2017	January 6, 2017	303
24	4	"#PicsOrItDidntHappen"	Stefan Brogren	Alejandro Alcoba	January 12, 2017	January 6, 2017	304
25	5	"#HugeIfTrue"	Phil Earnshaw	Courtney Jane Walker	January 13, 2017	January 6, 2017	305
26	6	"#ThatFeelingWhen"	Phil Earnshaw	Jennifer Kassabian	January 16, 2017	January 6, 2017	306
27	7	"#Unsubscribe"	Phil Earnshaw	Ian MacIntyre	January 17, 2017	January 6, 2017	307
28	8	"#IRegretNothing"	Phil Earnshaw	Sarah Glinski	January 18, 2017	January 6, 2017	308
29	9	"#Woke"	Stefan Brogren	Sarah Glinski	January 19, 2017	January 6, 2017	309
30	10	"#ImSleep"	Stefan Brogren	Matt Huether	January 20, 2017	January 6, 2017	310

=== Season 4 (2017) ===
No. overall	No. in season	Title	Directed by	Written by	Original release date	Netflix Release	Prod. code
31	1	"#BackToReality"	Stefan Brogren	Alejandro Alcoba	June 30, 2017	July 7, 2017	401
32	2	"#GetMoney"	Stefan Brogren	Courtney Jane Walker	June 30, 2017	July 7, 2017	402
33	3	"#ILookLikeA"	Samir Rehem	Ian MacIntyre	June 30, 2017	July 7, 2017	403
34	4	"#RollUpToTheClubLike"	Samir Rehem	Matt Huether	June 30, 2017	July 7, 2017	404
35	5	"#Preach"	Samir Rehem	Jennifer Kassabian	June 30, 2017	July 7, 2017	405
36	6	"#FactsOnly"	Samir Rehem	Courtney Jane Walker	June 30, 2017	July 7, 2017	406
37	7	"#Fire"	Stefan Brogren	Courtney Jane Walker	June 30, 2017	July 7, 2017	407
38	8	"#GetYouAManThatCanDoBoth"	Stefan Brogren	Matt Huether & Celeste Bronfman	June 30, 2017	July 7, 2017	408
39	9	"#Obsessed"	Stefan Brogren	Sarah Glinski	June 30, 2017	July 7, 2017	409
40	10	"#KThxBye"	Stefan Brogren	Sarah Glinski	June 30, 2017	July 7, 2017	410
