= Showtime (Degrassi High) =

- Degrassi High episodes
- The body of Claude Tanner (David Armin-Parcells) lay in a bathroom stall, after having been discovered there by Archie "Snake" Simpson (Stefan Brogren).
- Episode nos.: Season 2 Episodes 10 and 11
- Directed by: Kit Hood
- Written by: Yan Moore
- Editing by: Eric Wrate
- Production code: 511
- Original air dates: January 28, 1991 & February 4, 1991 (CAN)

Episode chronology
← Previous "Extracurricular Activities"	Next → "Three's A Crowd"

"Showtime" is a two-part episode of the second season of Canadian teen drama Degrassi High. The tenth and eleventh episodes respectively, it aired on the CBC on 28 January and 4 February 1991. In the leadup to a talent show, Claude Tanner (David Armin-Parcells) commits suicide.

== Production ==
The producers of Degrassi had previously contemplated addressing suicide, but feared that they would mishandle the subject and cause copycat suicides. The intent of the episode was to avoid glorifying suicide and instead focus on the ramifications it causes; David Armin-Parcells, who played Claude Tanner, the character who commits suicide, told the Montreal Gazette he felt the episode "portrays suicide as harsh, and keeps away from romanticizing death." On the original PBS broadcast in the United States, the episode was followed by a live phone-in telecast.

== Plot ==
=== Part one ===
Degrassi High is hosting a talent show, with auditions held in the auditorium. When Claude is called to audition, he recites a macabre poem he wrote, which is rejected for being inappropriate for the light-hearted nature of the talent show. In response, Claude storms out of the auditorium, calling everyone a "bunch of sheep". His friend Joanne follows him and tells him that she cares. Claude thanks her for being supportive but tells her that "you don't know what it's like to be me".

The next day, Claude approaches Caitlin with a white rose, telling her that he came to say goodbye. Caitlin is dismissive and tells him to stop harassing her. Claude walks to his locker, produces a gun, and makes his way to the washroom, leaving his locker open. In class, during a discussion about Macbeth, Snake asks to go to the washroom. There, he discovers Claude's body in a stall and promptly informs Mr. Raditch. Students begin to notice the police presence and speculate on what happened.

Each class is then informed of Claude's suicide, and reactions are mixed; Joanne is devastated. Lucy and Spike are critical, saying that it was selfish of him to take his own life as it affected everybody around him; another student declares Claude is "going to hell" as suicide is a sin, and then breaks down crying. Bronco feels guilty for cutting Claude's poem off. At home, Caitlin finds a bouquet and letter addressed to her from Claude, in which he "forgives" her for her alleged treatment of him. She tosses the bouquet to the floor.

=== Part two ===
A discussion is held in the auditorium on the future of the talent show. Joanne feels it is inappropriate to go on with the talent show. Lucy argues that "life has to go on", angering Joanne and prompting her to storm out. Spike suggests holding the talent show as a benefit for Claude's family, which is accepted. In science class, Caitlin starts hearing Claude in her head. She is paired with Joey, who is having trouble with his project. Wheels repays Joey money he had stolen from his mother previously, and they reconcile. Joey confirms rumours Wheels heard about Snake finding Claude. Joey goes to see Snake, who describes what he saw and regrets not being there sooner to stop it.

Caitlin is haunted by Claude in her dreams at night, and the next day, she discovers a peace symbol earring Claude had given to her, which she discards. Joey comes over to her house to work on the project they were paired for. Joey doesn't take the work seriously, which frustrates her. The conversation then turns to Claude. Caitlin initially doesn't want to talk about it, but eventually does, saying she thought he was "visiting relatives or something" when he said goodbye to her. She says she didn't mean to hurt Claude. Joey tells her that Claude wanted to hurt her and make her feel guilty, and to not give him the satisfaction; Caitlin finally breaks down and embraces Joey. The talent show begins the next day with a short speech from Joanne, acknowledging Claude's death and saying the event was for "anybody who feels depressed". Backstage, Joey and Caitlin have a brief conversation.

== Reception ==
Writing for the Vancouver Sun, Hester Riches stated that the producers of Degrassi had created a "tight drama" that was "unflinchingly unsympathetic" to the act of suicide, noting other contemporary American movies that appeared to glamorize it. In 2022, B.R. Doherty of the Canberra Times called the episode "groundbreaking" and declared it "remains shocking and served as something of a full-stop to our own childhood".

The episode was broadcast unedited in Australia on ABC during its original run, but was altered or censored when it aired again on Nickelodeon Australia.
