= List of awards and nominations received by the Degrassi franchise =

List of Degrassi awards
Award	Wins	Nominations
ACTRA Award	0	1
American Children's Television Festival	1	1
Awards of Excellence Gala	7	7
Banff Television Festival	1	1
Canadian Film and Television Awards	2	2
Canadian Screen Awards	4	7
Canadian Screenwriting Awards	2	4
The Chris Awards	7	7
Creative Arts Emmy Award	0	2
DGC Awards	6	13
The EDGE Awards	1	1
Gemini Awards	28	38
GLAAD Media Awards	0	5
Hugo Awards	1	1
Humanitas Prize	1	1
Ingenuity Award	1	1
International Emmy Awards	2	2
International New Media Festival	2	2
The Joey Awards, Vancouver	1	8
NAACP Image Awards	0	1
NCFR Media Awards	10	10
Parents' Choice Award	3	3
Peabody Award	1	1
PRISM Awards	1	1
Prix Jeunesse	2	2
Shaw Rocket Fund	1	1
SHINE Awards	2	2
Teen Choice Awards	2	2
TCA Award	2	2
TV Guide Reader's Choice Award	1	1
U. S. International Film and Video Festival	1	1
Young Artist Awards	8	25
Young Entertainer Awards	0	3
- Totals
Awards won	100
Nominations	161
- Footnotes

This is a list of notable awards won by Degrassi, a Canadian teen drama entertainment series and media franchise that depicts a group of students facing the typical issues and challenges of teen life. The Degrassi fictional universe, created by Linda Schuyler and Kit Hood under their production company Playing With Time, is the setting of five television series that began with The Kids of Degrassi Street in 1979 and ended with Degrassi: Next Class in 2017. In addition, television movies (School's Out, Degrassi Takes Manhattan), documentary mini-series (Degrassi Talks), as well as books (Degrassi Junior High and High novels, Degrassi: Extra Credit) and other multimedia complement the franchise.

Spanning four decades, Degrassi has won many different awards, including twenty-eight Gemini Awards, six Directors Guild of Canada Awards, and a Peabody Award. In 2005, Degrassi was the subject of a CBC Television Gemini Special as the "Top Canadian Show of the Last 20 Years", while Degrassi: The Next Generation was the first Canadian series to be awarded the Choice Summer Series at the Teen Choice Awards. Each incarnation in the Degrassi franchise has received recognition: The Kids of Degrassi Street received eight awards and one nominations; Degrassi Junior High received twenty awards and six nominations; Degrassi High received seven awards and six nominations; School's Out won one award and one other nomination; Degrassi Talks garnered one nomination; Degrassi: The Next Generation earned itself fifty-seven awards and another seventy-five nominations; and Degrassi: Next Class garnered four wins with another twenty-three nominations to date.

== ACTRA Award ==
The ACTRA Awards celebrate excellence in television and radio industries. They were first presented in 1972 then revived in 2003 with regional branches presenting their own awards.

Year	Category	Series	Nominee	Result	Ref
2017	Outstanding Performance - Male	Degrassi: Next Generation	Eric Osborne	Nominated	

== American Children's Television Festival ==
Year	Category	Series	Nominee	Result	Ref
1989	Ollie Award	Degrassi Junior High		Won	

== Awards of Excellence Gala ==
The Awards of Excellence Gala is hosted annually by the Alliance for Children and Television, formerly known as the Children's Broadcast Institute. Professionals involved in children's television productions award children's programs made in Canada that stand out for their excellence. The ACT has honoured Degrassi with seven awards and one nomination. Linda Schuyler and Kit Hood also won an award for "Best Independent Producer" in 1983.

Year	Category	Series	Nominee	Result	Ref
1983	Independent Producer's Award	The Kids of Degrassi Street	Linda Schuyler and Kit Hood	Won	
1985	All Genres - Teen	The Kids of Degrassi Street	"Griff Makes a Date"	Won	
1987	All Genres - Teen	The Kids of Degrassi Street	"Griff Gets a Hand"	Won	
1989	All Genres - Teen	Degrassi Junior High	"He Ain't Heavy"	Won	
1989	All Genres - Teen	Degrassi High	"A New Start"	Won	
1992	All Genres - Teen	School's Out		Won	
2003	All Genres - Teen	Degrassi: The Next Generation		Won	
2007	All Genres - Teen	Degrassi: The Next Generation		Nominated	

== Banff Television Festival ==
Year	Category	Series	Nominee	Result	Ref
1987	Best Continuing Series	Degrassi Junior High		Won	

== Canadian Film & Television Awards ==
Year	Category	Series	Nominee	Result	Ref
1985	Best Instructional/Educational Broadcast Program	The Kids of Degrassi Street	"Griff Makes a Date"	Won	
1987	Personal Achievement	The Kids of Degrassi Street	Linda Schuyler and Kit Hood	Won	

== Canadian Screen Awards ==
The Canadian Screen Awards are an annual Canadian television industry awards ceremony given out by the Academy of Canadian Cinema & Television to Canadian television shows, films, and digital media. It replaced the Gemini Awards in 2012.

Year	Category	Series	Nominee	Result	Ref
2013	Best Children's or Youth Fiction Program or Series	Degrassi	Linda Schuyler, Stefan Brogren, David Lowe, Stephen Stohn, Stephanie Williams, and Brendon Yorke	Won	
2013	Best Performance in a Children's or Youth Program or Series	Degrassi	Charlotte Arnold for "Rock you Body (Part 2)"	Nominated	
2013	Best Performance in a Children's or Youth Program or Series	Degrassi	Jahmil French for "Smash Into You"	Nominated	
2013	Best Direction in a Children's or Youth Program or Series	Degrassi	Phil Earnshaw for "Scream (Part 2)"	Won	
2013	Best Performance in a Children's or Youth Program or Series	Degrassi	Dylan Everett for "Rusty Cage (Part 2)"	Nominated	
2013	Best Performance in a Children's or Youth Program or Series	Degrassi	Aislinn Paul for "Waterfalls (Part 2)"	Nominated	
2017	Best Children's or Youth Fiction Program or Series	Degrassi: Next Class		Nominated	
2017	Best Direction in a Children's or Youth Program or Series	Degrassi: Next Class	Episode "#ThisCouldBeUsButYouPlayin" – Family Channel (DHX)	Won	
2017	Best Writing in a Children's or Youth Program or Series	Degrassi: Next Class	Episode "#YesMeansYes" – Family Channel (DHX)	Won	
2018	Best Children's or Youth Fiction Program or Series	Degrassi: Next Class		Nominated	
2018	Best Performance in a Children's or Youth Series	Degrassi: Next Class	Amanda Arcuri	Nominated	
2018	Best Writing in a Children's or Youth Series	Degrassi: Next Class	Matt Huether for "#ImSleep"	Nominated	
2018	Best Writing in a Children's or Youth Series	Degrassi: Next Class	Sarah Glinski for "#IRegretNothing"	Nominated	

== Canadian Screenwriting Awards ==
First awarded in 1997, the Canadian Screenwriting Awards are given out annually by the Writers Guild of Canada. Through Degrassi: The Next Generation, Degrassi has received nominations for three Best Youth Script Awards, and won two of them. 2005 saw two D:TNG episodes pitted against each other.

Year	Category	Series	Nominee(s)	Result	Ref
2004	Best Youth Script Awards	Degrassi: The Next Generation	Aaron Martin, James Hurst and Shelley Scarrow for "Pride"	Won	
2005	Best Youth Script Awards	Degrassi: The Next Generation	James Hurst and Miklos Perlus for "Mercy Street"	Won	
2005	Best Youth Script Awards	Degrassi: The Next Generation	Shelley Scarrow for "Secret (Part 1)"	Nominated	
2017	Tweens & Teens	Degrassi: Next Class	Ian MacIntyre for "#TeamFollowBack"	Won	
2018	Tween & Teens	Degrassi: Next Class	Courtney Jane Walker for "#FactsOnly"	Nominated	
2018	Tweens & Teens	Degrassi: Next Class	Matt Huether for "#RollUpToTheClubLike"	Nominated	

== The Chris Awards ==
The Chris Awards are hosted by the Columbus International Film and Video Festival, an annual film festival held in Columbus, OH to encourage and promote the use of film and video in all forms of education and communication. Degrassi has seven Chris Statuettes, the highest award given to film or video productions. Entries are judged on a seven-point rating system. A superior rating of seven is required for winning the Chris.

Year	Category	Series	Nominee	Result	Ref
1988	Chris Statuette	Degrassi Junior High	"The Best Laid Plans"	Won	
1988	Chris Statuette	Degrassi Junior High	"A Helping Hand"	Won	
1989	Chris Statuette	Degrassi Junior High	"Bottled Up"	Won	
1990	Chris Statuette	Degrassi High	"Nobody's Perfect"	Won	
1990	Chris Statuette	Degrassi High	"A New Start"	Won	
1991	Chris Statuette	Degrassi High	"Crossed Wires"	Won	
1991	Chris Statuette	Degrassi High	"Bad Blood"	Won	

== Creative Arts Emmy Awards ==
The Creative Arts Emmy Award is a class of Emmy Awards presented in recognition of technical and other similar achievements in American television programming. The Creative Arts Emmys also include such categories as outstanding animated programs and guest acting.

Year	Category	Series	Nominee	Result	Ref
2011	Outstanding Children's Program	Degrassi	"My Body Is a Cage, Part 2"	Nominated	
2012	Outstanding Children's Program	Degrassi	"Extraordinary Machine, Part 2"	Nominated	
2014	Outstanding Children's Program	Degrassi	"Unbelievable"	Nominated	

== DGC Awards ==
The Directors Guild of Canada's first award ceremony was held on October 5, 2002. As such, only Degrassi: The Next Generation has been able to garner recognition for Degrassi. Degrassi has won six awards, taking home three of those in 2003, more than any other television production.

Year	Category	Series	Nominee	Result	Ref
2002	Outstanding Achievement in a Television Series - Children's	Degrassi: The Next Generation	Bruce McDonald et al. for "Mother and Child Reunion"	Won	
2002	Outstanding Achievement in Picture Editing	Degrassi: The Next Generation	Stephen Withrow for "Mother and Child Reunion"	Nominated	
2003	Outstanding Achievement in a Television Series - Children's	Degrassi: The Next Generation	Bruce McDonald et al. for "When Doves Cry"	Won	
2003	Outstanding Achievement in Direction – Television Series	Degrassi: The Next Generation	Bruce McDonald for "White Wedding"	Won	
2003	Outstanding Achievement in Picture Editing - Short Form	Degrassi: The Next Generation	Stephen Withrow for "When Doves Cry"	Won	
2003	Outstanding Achievement in Production Design – Short Form	Degrassi: The Next Generation	Stephen Stanley for "White Wedding"	Nominated	
2004	Outstanding Achievement in a Television Series - Family	Degrassi: The Next Generation	"Holiday"	Won	
2004	Outstanding Achievement in Production Design – Television Series	Degrassi: The Next Generation	Stephen Stanley for "Holiday"	Nominated	
2005	Outstanding Achievement in a Television Series - Family	Degrassi: The Next Generation	Stefan Sciani et al. for "Time Stands Still (Part 2)"	Won	
2005	Outstanding Achievement in Production Design – Television Series>	Degrassi: The Next Generation	Stephen Stanley for "Goin' Down the Road"	Nominated	
2007	Outstanding Achievement in a Television Series - Family	Degrassi: The Next Generation	for "Can't Hardly Wait"	Nominated	
2007	Outstanding Achievement in Production Design – Television Series	Degrassi: The Next Generation	Stephen Stanley for "What it Feels Like to be a Ghost (Part 2)"	Nominated	
2008	Outstanding Achievement in a Television Series - Family	Degrassi: The Next Generation	Patrick Williams for "Pass the Dutchie"	Nominated	
2008	Outstanding Achievement in Sound Editing - Television Series	Degrassi: The Next Generation	Danielle McBride (Dialogue Editor), Dan Sexton (Sound Effects Editor), John Loranger (1st Assistant Sound Editor) for "Pass the Dutchie"	Nominated	
2016	Outstanding Directorial Achievement in a Family Series	Degrassi: Next Class	Stefan Brogren, Director; Joshua Gray, 1st Assistant Director; Andrew McNeill, 2nd Assistant Director; James Dalton, 3rd Assistant Director; Jimmy Palferro, Trainee Assistant Director; Michael Bawcutt, Production Manager; Linda Keyworth, Assistant Production Manager; Chris Martin, Location Manager; Bruce Jackson, Location Production Assistant; Peter Mabrucco, Production Assistant; Anthony J. Grosse, Production Accountant; Sheralyn McGrath, 1st Assistant Accountant; Stephen Stanley, Production Designer; Hayley Isaacs, 1st Assistant Art Director; Andrew Lima, 1st Assistant Art Director; Maria Gutierrez, Trainee Assistant Art Director; Fabrizio Sclocco, Trainee Assistant Art Director; Danielle McBride, Supervising Sound Editor; John Douglas Smith, SFX Editor; Marvyn Dennis, Dialogue Editor; Craig MacLellan, 1st Assistant Sound Editor; Jason Irvine, Picture Editor; Lee-Ann Cass, 1st Assistant Picture Editor; Amanda Mitro, Assistant Picture Editor for "#BootyCall"	Nominated	
2016	Outstanding Directorial Achievement in a Family Series	Degrassi: Next Class	Stefan Brogren, Director; Joshua Gray, 1st Assistant Director; Andrew McNeill, 2nd Assistant Director; Tal Aulbrook, 3rd Assistant Director; Michael Bawcutt, Production Manager; Linda Keyworth, Assistant Production Manager; Jimmy Palferro, Trainee Assistant Director; James Dalton, Production Assistant; Chris Martin, Location Manager; Bruce Jackson, Location Production Assistant; Anthony J. Grosse, Production Accountant; Sheralyn McGrath, 1st Assistant Accountant; Stephen Stanley, Production Designer; Hayley Isaacs, 1st Assistant Art Director; Andrew Lima, 1st Assistant Art Director; Maria Gutierrez, Trainee Assistant Art Director; Fabrizio Sclocco, Trainee Assistant Art Director; Danielle McBride, Supervising Sound Editor; John Douglas Smith, SFX Editor; Marvyn Dennis, Dialogue Editor; Craig MacLellan, 1st Assistant Sound Editor; Michael Legedza, 1st Assistant Sound Editor; Nicholas Wong, Picture Editor; Lee-Ann Cass, 1st Assistant Picture Editor; Amanda Mitro, Assistant Picture Editor for "#SorryNotSorry"	Nominated	
2016	Outstanding Directorial Achievement in a Family Series	Degrassi: Next Class	Eleanore Lindo, Director; Mark Pancer, 1st Assistant Director; Eric Banz, 2nd Assistant Director; Tal Aulbrook, 3rd Assistant Director; Michael Bawcutt, Production Manager; Linda Keyworth, Assistant Production Manager; Jimmy Palferro, Trainee Assistant Director; James Dalton, Production Assistant; Chris Martin, Location Manager; Bruce Jackson, Location Production Assistant; Anthony J. Grosse, Production Accountant; Sheralyn McGrath, 1st Assistant Accountant; Stephen Stanley, Production Designer; Andrew Lima, 1st Assistant Art Director; Hayley Isaacs, 1st Assistant Art Director; Maria Gutierrez, Trainee Assistant Art Director; Fabrizio Sclocco, Trainee Assistant Art Director; Danielle McBride, Supervising Sound Editor; John Douglas Smith, SFX Editor; Marvyn Dennis, Dialogue Editor; Craig MacLellan, 1st Assistant Sound Editor; Nicholas Wong, Picture Editor; Lee-Ann Cass, 1st Assistant Picture Editor; Amanda Mitro, Assistant Picture Editor for "#ThisCouldBeUsButYouPlayin"	Nominated	
2017	Outstanding Directorial Achievement in a Family Series	Degrassi: Next Class	Stefan Brogren for "#ImSleep"	Nominated	
2017	Outstanding Directorial Achievement in a Family Series	Degrassi: Next Class	Philip Earnshaw for "#IRegretNothing"	Nominated	

== The EDGE Awards ==
The EDGE (Entertainment Depiction of Gun Education) Awards recognize feature films, TV movies, reality programs and episodes of scripted television series that effectively promote firearm safety and discourage gun violence. They are awarded annually by The Entertainment Industries Council.

Year	Category	Series	Nominee	Result	Ref
2006	Children's Live Action Episode or Special for TV	Degrassi: The Next Generation	"Time Stands Still"	Won	

== Gemini Awards ==
The Gemini Awards were an annual Canadian television industry awards ceremony given out by the Academy of Canadian Cinema and Television to English language television shows. Awarded from 1986 to 2011, every incarnation of Degrassi was nominated for at least one award each year they have been on air, except 1991. Together, they have won twenty-four awards and thirty-five more nominations.

Year	Category	Series	Nominee	Result	Ref
1986	Best Children's Program	The Kids Of Degrassi Street	Linda Schuyler and Kit Hood for "Griff Gets a Hand"	Won	
1986	Best Writing in a Dramatic Program or Series	The Kids Of Degrassi Street	Yan Moore for "Griff Gets a Hand"	Nominated	
1987	Best Direction in a Dramatic or Comedy Series	Degrassi Junior High	Kit Hood	Won	
1987	Best Children's Series	Degrassi Junior High	Linda Schuyler and Kit Hood	Won	
1987	Best Performance by a Lead Actor in a Continuing Dramatic Role	Degrassi Junior High	Pat Mastroianni	Nominated	
1987	Best Performance by a Lead Actress in a Continuing Dramatic Role	Degrassi Junior High	Stacie Mistysyn	Nominated	
1987	Best Performance by a Lead Actress in a Continuing Dramatic Role	Degrassi Junior High	Nicole Stoffman	Nominated	
1988	Best Direction in a Dramatic or Comedy Series	Degrassi Junior High	Kit Hood	Won	
1988	Best Dramatic Series	Degrassi Junior High	Linda Schuyler and Kit Hood	Won	
1988	The Multiculturalism Award	Degrassi Junior High		Won	
1988	Best Performance by a Lead Actor in a Continuing Dramatic Role	Degrassi Junior High	Pat Mastrioanni	Won	
1989	Best Dramatic Series	Degrassi Junior High	Linda Schuyler and Kit Hood	Won	
1989	Best Performance by a Lead Actor in a Continuing Dramatic Role	Degrassi Junior High	Stefan Brogren	Nominated	
1989	Best Performance by a Lead Actress in a Continuing Dramatic Role	Degrassi Junior High	Stacie Mistycyn	Won	
1990	Best Performance by a Lead Actor in a Continuing Dramatic Role	Degrassi High	Duncan Waugh	Nominated	
1990	Best Performance by a Lead Actor in a Continuing Dramatic Role	Degrassi High	Pat Mastrioanni	Nominated	
1990	Best Performance by a Lead Actress in a Continuing Dramatic Role	Degrassi High	Angela Deiseach	Nominated	
1990	Best Performance by a Lead Actress in a Continuing Dramatic Role	Degrassi High	Amanda Stepto	Nominated	
1992	Best Dramatic Series	Degrassi High	Linda Schuyler and Kit Hood	Nominated	
1993	Best Television Movie	School's Out	Linda Schuyler and Kit Hood	Nominated	
1993	Best Youth Program or Series	Degrassi Talks	Linda Schuyler and Kit Hood	Nominated	
2002	Best Photography in a Dramatic Program or Series	Degrassi: The Next Generation	Gavin Smith for "Mother and Child Reunion"	Nominated	
2002	Best Short Dramatic Program	Degrassi: The Next Generation	Linda Schuyler and Stephen Stohn for "Mother and Child Reunion"	Nominated	
2002	Geminis' Hottest Star	Degrassi: The Next Generation	Daniel Clark	Nominated	
2002	Geminis' Hottest Star	Degrassi: The Next Generation	Stefan Brogren	Nominated	
2002	Most Innovative Website Competition	Degrassi: The Next Generation	Linda Schuyler, Stephen Stohn, Raja Khanna and Roma Khanna for http://www.degrassi.tv	Won	
2003	Best Children's or Youth Fiction Program or Series	Degrassi: The Next Generation	Linda Schuyler and Stephen Stohn	Won	
2003	Best Direction in a Children's or Youth Program or Series	Degrassi: The Next Generation	Bruce McDonald for "Weird Science"	Won	
2003	Best Interactive	Degrassi: The Next Generation	Linda Schuyler, Stephen Stohn, Raja Khanna and Roma Khanna for Degrassi: The Next Generation and http://www.degrassi.tv	Won	
2003	Best Performance in a Children's or Youth Program or Series	Degrassi: The Next Generation	Jake Epstein for "Tears are Not Enough"	Won	
2003	Best Picture Editing in a Dramatic Series	Degrassi: The Next Generation	Stephen Withrow for "White Wedding"	Nominated	
2003	Best Short Dramatic Program	Degrassi: The Next Generation	Linda Schuyler and Stephen Stohn	Nominated	
2003	Best Writing for a Children's or Youths' Program or Series	Degrassi: The Next Generation	Aaron Martin and Craig Cornell for "Careless Whisper"	Nominated	
2003	Most Popular Website Competition	Degrassi: The Next Generation	Linda Schuyler, Stephen Stohn, Raja Khanna and Roma Khanna for http://www.degrassi.tv	Won	
2004	Best Children's or Youth Fiction Program or Series	Degrassi: The Next Generation	Linda Schuyler and Stephen Stohn	Won	
2004	Best Direction in a Children's or Youths' Program or Series	Degrassi: The Next Generation	Philip Earnshaw for "Pride"	Won	
2004	Best Interactive	Degrassi: The Next Generation	Linda Schuyler, Stephen Stohn and Raja Khanna for Degrassi: The Next Generation and http://www.degrassi.tv	Nominated	
2004	Best Performance in a Children's or Youth Program or Series	Degrassi: The Next Generation	Jake Epstein for "Should I Stay or Should I Go"	Nominated	
2004	Best Writing for a Children's or Youth Program or Series	Degrassi: The Next Generation	Shelley Scarrow, Nicole Demerse and James Hurst for "Accidents Will Happen"	Nominated	
2005	Best Dramatic Series	Degrassi: The Next Generation	Linda Schuyler, Stephen Stohn and Aaron Martin	Nominated	
2005	Most Popular Website	Degrassi: The Next Generation	Linda Schuyler, Stephen Stohn, and Raja Khanna for http://www.degrassi.tv	Nominated	
2005	CBC Television Gemini Special: Top Canadian Show for the Last 20 Years		Degrassi	Won	
2006	Best Original Music Score for a Dramatic Series	Degrassi: The Next Generation	Jim McGrath for "Our Lips are Sealed"	Won	
2007	Best Children's or Youth Fiction Program or Series	Degrassi: The Next Generation	Linda Schuyler, Stephen Stohn, James Hurst, David Lowe and Stephanie Williams	Nominated	
2007	Best Original Music Score for a Dramatic Series	Degrassi: The Next Generation	Jim McGrath for "Our Lips are Sealed"	Nominated	
2007	Best Performance in a Children's or Youth Program or Series	Degrassi: The Next Generation	Shenae Grimes for "Eyes Without a Face (Part 2)"	Won	
2007	Best Sound in a Dramatic Series	Degrassi: The Next Generation	Paul Williamson, Virginia Storey, Bill McMillan, Mike Baskerville, Steven Munro and Danielle McBride	Nominated	
2008	Best Children's or Youth Fiction Program or Series	Degrassi: The Next Generation	Linda Schuyler, Stephen Stohn, David Lowe, Brendon Yorke and Stephanie Williams	Won	
2008	Best Performance in a Children's or Youth Program or Series	Degrassi: The Next Generation	Shane Kippel for "Death or Glory (Part 2)"	Nominated	
2008	Best Performance in a Children's or Youth Program or Series	Degrassi: The Next Generation	Lauren Collins for "Talking in Your Sleep"	Nominated	
2008	Best Direction in a Children's or Youth Program or Series	Degrassi: The Next Generation	Philip Earnshaw for "Standing in the Dark (Part 1)"	Nominated	
2009	Best Direction in a Children's or Youth Program or Series	Degrassi: The Next Generation	Eleanor Lindo for "Fight the Power"	Won	
2009	Best Performance in a Children's or Youth Program or Series	Degrassi: The Next Generation	Paula Brancati for "Fight the Power"	Nominated	
2009	Best Performance in a Children's or Youth Program or Series	Degrassi: The Next Generation	Stacey Farber for "Paradise City (Part 3)"	Nominated	
2010	Best Children's or Youth Fiction Program or Series	Degrassi: The Next Generation	Linda Schuyler, Stefan Brogren, David Lowe, Stephen Stohn, Stephanie Williams, and Brendon Yorke	Nominated	
2010	Best Direction in a Children's or Youth Program or Series	Degrassi: The Next Generation	Stefan Brogren for "Beat It (Part 2)"	Won	
2010	Best Direction in a Children's or Youth Program or Series	Degrassi: The Next Generation	Phil Earnshaw for "Just Can't Get Enough (Part 2)"	Nominated	
2010	Best Performance in a Children's or Youth Program or Series	Degrassi: The Next Generation	Charlotte Arnold for "Somebody"	Won	
2010	Best Performance in a Children's or Youth Program or Series	Degrassi: The Next Generation	Landon Liboiron for "Waiting For a Girl Like You"	Nominated	
2010	Academy Achievement Award		Linda Schuyler	Won	
2011	Best Children's or Youth Fiction Program or Series	Degrassi	Linda Schuyler, Stefan Brogren, David Lowe, Stephen Stohn, Stephanie Williams, and Brendon Yorke	Won	
2011	Best Direction in a Children's or Youth Program or Series	Degrassi	Phil Earnshaw for "My Body Is a Cage (Part 2)"	Nominated	
2011	Best Direction in a Children's or Youth Program or Series	Degrassi	Pat Williams for "All Falls Down (Part 2)"	Won	
2011	Best Sound in a Dramatic Program	"Degrassi Takes Manhattan"	Robert Fletcher, Mike Baskervillem, John Dykstra, Danielle McBride, Dan Sexton, and Virginia Storey	Nominated	
2011	Best Writing in a Children's or Youth Program or Series	Degrassi	Michael Grassi for "My Body Is a Cage (Part 2)"	Nominated	
2011	Best Performance in a Children's or Youth Program or Series	Degrassi	Jordan Todosey for "My Body Is a Cage (Part 2)"	Won	

== GLAAD Media Awards ==
The GLAAD Media Awards were created in 1990 by the Gay & Lesbian Alliance Against Defamation to recognize and honor the mainstream media for their fair, accurate and inclusive representations of the LGBT community and the issues that affect their lives.

Year	Category	Series	Result	Ref
2004	Outstanding Drama Series	Degrassi: The Next Generation	Nominated	
2008	Outstanding Drama Series	Degrassi: The Next Generation	Nominated	
2011	Outstanding Drama Series	Degrassi	Nominated	
2012	Outstanding Drama Series	Degrassi	Nominated	
2013	Outstanding Drama Series	Degrassi	Nominated	

== The Hugo Awards ==
The Chicago International Film Festival awarded Degrassi: The Next Generation a Silver Plaque at the Hugo Awards (not to be confused with the Hugo Awards for the best science fiction or fantasy works from the World Science Fiction Society) for Best Children's Program in 2003.

Year	Category	Series	Nominee	Result	Notes	Ref
2003	Best Children's Program	Degrassi: The Next Generation		Won	Silver Plaque	

== Humanitas Prize ==
The Humanitas Prize is an award for film and television writing intended to promote human dignity, meaning, and freedom. It was first award in 1975 for television writers only. Nineteen years later, it was expanded to include films. Degrassi: Next Class is the only series in the franchise to be a finalist and win.

Year	Category	Series	Nominee	Result	Ref
2017	Children's Live Action Category	Degrassi: Next Class	Courtney Jane Walker for "#TurntUp"	Nominated	
2018	Children's Live Action Category	Degrassi: Next Class	Matt Huether for "#ImSleep"	Won	

== Ingenuity Award ==
The Ingenuity Award recognizes individuals for their accomplishments in promoting new and better ways of doing things for Canada. 2004 saw Degrassi creator and Epitome Pictures president Linda Schuyler win an Ingenuity award for her work in Canadian television.

Year	Category	Series	Nominee	Result	Ref
2002		Degrassi	Linda Schuyler	Won	

== International Emmy Awards ==
The International Emmy Awards are presented to the best television programs produced throughout the world. Degrassi has won two International Emmy in the "Children & Young People" category through The Kids of Degrassi Street and Degrassi Junior High. When executive producer Kit Hood accepted the award for DJH, he announced that if Spike's baby were a boy, it would be named Ralph, after the president of the ATAS, and if it was a girl, it would be called Emma, after the Emmy.

Year	Category	Series	Nominee	Result	Ref
1986	Children & Young People	The Kids of Degrassi Street	"Griff Gets a Hand"	Won	
1987	Children & Young People	Degrassi Junior High	"It's Late"	Won	
1988	Children & Young People	Degrassi Junior High	"Great Expectations"	Nominated	

== International New Media Awards ==
The International New Media Awards are judged by new media professionals and presented at the annual International New Media Festival. Degrassi won two awards in 2002 for its official website.

Year	Category	Series	Nominee	Result	Ref
2002	Entertainment Website	Degrassi: The Next Generation	Linda Schuyler, Stephen Stohn, Raja Khanna and Roma Khanna for http://www.degrassi.tv	Won	
2002	Best Technical Achievement	Degrassi: The Next Generation	Linda Schuyler, Stephen Stohn, Raja Khanna and Roma Khanna for http://www.degrassi.tv	Won	

== The Joey Awards, Vancouver ==
The Joey Awards are presented to honour and recognize young performers in Canada through awards and educating parents on keeping them safe in show business.

Year	Category	Series	Nominee	Result	Ref
2016	Young Actor in a TV Drama Series Leading Role	Degrassi: Next Class	Ehren Kassam	Nominated	
2016	Young Actor in a TV Drama Series Leading Role	Degrassi: Next Class	Eric Osborne	Nominated	
2017	Best Series Regular or Leading Actress in a TV Series 16 Years & Over	Degrassi: Next Class	Jamie Bloch	Nominated	
2017	Best Series Regular or Leading Actress in a TV Series 16 Years & Over	Degrassi: Next Class	Chelsea Clark	Nominated	
2017	Best Series Regular or Leading Actress in a TV Series 16 Years & Over	Degrassi: Next Class	Dalia Yegavian	Won	
2017	Best Series Regular or Leading Actor in a TV Series 18 Years & Up	Degrassi: Next Class	André Dae Kim	Nominated	
2017	Best Series Regular or Leading Actor in a TV Series 18 Years & Up	Degrassi: Next Class	Richard Walters	Nominated	
2017	Best Series Regular or Leading Actor in a TV Series 18 Years & Up	Degrassi: Next Class	Ehren Kassam	Nominated	

== NAACP Image Awards ==
The NAACP Image Awards are presented by the National Association for the Advancement of Colored People to honour outstanding people of color in film, television, music, and literature.

Year	Category	Series	Result	Ref
2013	Outstanding Children's Program	Degrassi	Nominated	

== The NCFR Media Awards ==
The National Council on Family Relations recognised Degrassi: The Next Generation for its quality family programming at its 34th Annual Awards in 2001, and 36th in 2003. The awards recognize excellence in commercial and educational television that address social issues. Degrassi has received seven first place awards for six episodes, two second place award for two more episodes, and an honorable mention for another.

Year	Category	Series	Nominee	Result	Notes	Ref
2001	Teenage Pregnancy and Sexuality	Degrassi: The Next Generation	"The Mating Game"	Won	1st Place	
2001	Marital and Family Issues	Degrassi: The Next Generation	"Parent's Day"	Won	1st Place	
2001	Communications	Degrassi: The Next Generation	"Parent's Day"	Won	1st Place	
2001	Addiction/Substance	Degrassi: The Next Generation	"Basketball Diaries"	Won	1st Place	
2001	Contemporary Social Issues	Degrassi: The Next Generation	"Eye of the Beholder"	Won	1st Place	
2001	Human Development Across the Life Span	Degrassi: The Next Generation	"Coming of Age"	Won	2nd Place	
2003	Family Violence/Abuse	Degrassi: The Next Generation	"When Doves Cry"	Won	1st Place	
2003	Diverse Family Systems	Degrassi: The Next Generation	"Don't Believe the Hype"	Won	1st Place	
2003	Sexuality/Sex Roles/Teen Pregnancy	Degrassi: The Next Generation	"Careless Whisper"	Won	2nd Place	
2003	Health/Stress/Crisis	Degrassi: The Next Generation	"Shout"	Won	Honourable Mention	

== Parent's Choice Award ==
The Parents' Choice Awards have been awarded to the best children's media since 1978. The judging panel is made up of educators, scientists, performing artists, librarians, parents and kids to help parents make informed decisions about which new products are right for their children.

Year	Category	Series	Nominee	Result	Ref
1988	Teen dilemmas portrayed with honesty and humor	Degrassi Junior High		Won	
1989	Teen dilemmas portrayed with honesty and humor	Degrassi Junior High		Won	
1991	Teen dilemmas portrayed with honesty and humor	Degrassi Junior High		Won	

== Peabody Award ==
First awarded in 1941, the George Foster Peabody Award awards excellence in radio and television broadcasting.

Year	Category	Series	Nomiee	Result	Ref
2010		Degrassi	"My Body Is a Cage"	Won	

== PRISM Awards ==
The PRISM Awards are awarded by the Entertainment Industries Council for entertainment for accurate portrayals of substance abuse, addiction and mental health.

Year	Category	Series	Nomiee	Result	Ref
2013	Teen Program	Degrassi		Won	

== Prix Jeunesse ==
Degrassi has won two Prix Jeunesse awards, and has been nominated for another two. The awards are held bi-annually in Munich, Germany, and aim to improve children's television worldwide by deepening understanding and promoting communication among nations.

Year	Category	Series	Nominee	Result	Ref
1986	Best Drama	The Kids of Degrassi Street	"Griff Makes a Date"	Won	
1992	Best Drama	Degrassi High	"Bad Blood"	Won	
2004	Best Children's Television Programme	Degrassi: The Next Generation		Nominated	
2004	Best Website	Degrassi: The Next Generation	Linda Schuyler, Stephen Stohn, and Raja Khanna for http://www.degrassi.tv	Nominated	

== Shaw Rocket Prize ==
Created in 2005, the Shaw Rocket Prize winner receives a rocket shaped statuette and CA$50,000, and is awarded for the best independent Canadian children's television program. The prize is given annually by the Shaw Rocket Fund, who provide financial support to Canadian productions.

Year	Category	Series	Nominee	Result	Ref
2005		Degrassi: The Next Generation		Won	

== SHINE Awards ==
The SHINE (Sexual Health IN Entertainment) Awards, originally the Nancy Susan Reynolds Awards, are conducted by The Media Project. The awards honour accurate and honest portrayals of sexuality in programming.

Year	Category	Series	Nominee	Result	Ref
1990	Best Youth Episodic (as Nancy Susan Reynolds Award)	Degrassi High	"A New Start"	Won	
2003	Best Youth Episodic	Degrassi: The Next Generation	"Careless Whisper"	Nominated	
2004	Best Youth Episodic	Degrassi: The Next Generation	"Shout"	Nominated	
2004	Best Youth Episodic	Degrassi: The Next Generation	"Pride"	Won	

== Teen Choice Awards ==
The Teen Choice Awards are presented annually by the Fox Broadcasting Company and Global Television Network. The program honors the year's biggest achievements in music, movies, sports, and television, as voted by teenagers aged twelve to nineteen. Degrassi: The Next Generation has garnered two awards for Degrassi.

Year	Category	Series	Nominee	Result	Ref
2005	Choice Summer Series	Degrassi: The Next Generation		Won	
2007	Choice Summer TV Show	Degrassi: The Next Generation		Won	
2008	Choice Summer TV Show	Degrassi: The Next Generation		Nominated	

== TCA Awards ==
The Television Critics Association (or TCA) is a group of approximately 200 United States and Canadian journalists and columnists who cover television programming. Since 1984 the organization has hosted the TCA Awards, honoring television excellence in 11 categories, which are presented every summer. Degrassi Junior High and Degrassi: The Next Generation have each won one award.

Year	Category	Series	Nominee	Result	Ref
1988	Outstanding Achievement in Children's Programming	Degrassi Junior High		Won	
2005	Outstanding Achievement in Children's Programming	Degrassi: The Next Generation		Won	

== TV Guide Reader's Choice Award ==
In 1989, the stars of Degrassi Junior High were featured on the cover of TV Guide after winning a Reader's Choice Award.

Year	Category	Series	Nominee	Result	Ref
1989	Most Entertaining Canadian Show	Degrassi Junior High		Won	

== U. S. International Film and Video Festival ==
The U. S. International Film and Video Festival grants Gold Camera, Silver Screen and Certificate of Creative Excellence awards. Winners are selected on the effectiveness of purpose and creativity not just numerical scoring. Therefore, the top award in a category is not necessarily a Gold Camera, but may be a Silver or Certificate winner. Conversely, more than one Gold, Silver or Certificate may be presented in a category. Degrassi has won one Silver Screen Award through Degrassi: The Next Generation in 2003.

Year	Category	Series	Nominee	Result	Ref
2003	Best Children's Programming	Degrassi: The Next Generation		Won	

== Young Artist Awards ==
Beginning in 1979, the Young Artist Awards have been presented annually in Los Angeles by the Young Artist Foundation. They have given Degrassi seven awards and twenty-four more nominations.

Year	Category	Series	Nominee	Result	Ref
1987	Most Promising New Fall Television Series	Degrassi Junior High		Nominated	
1990	Outstanding Young Ensemble Cast	Degrassi Junior High	Dayo Ade, Sara Ballingall, Stefan Brogren, Michael Carry, Christopher Charlesworth, Amanda Cook, Irene Courakos, Angela Deiseach, Anais Granofsky, Rebecca Haines, Neil Hope, Cathy Keenan, Pat Mastroianni, Maureen McKay, Stacie Mistysyn, Bill Parrott, Siluck Saysanasy, Amanda Stepto, Duncan Waugh	Nominated	
2002	Best Ensemble in a TV Series (Comedy or Drama)	Degrassi: The Next Generation	Daniel Clark, Lauren Collins, Ryan Cooley, Jake Goldsbie, Aubrey Graham, Shane Kippel, Miriam McDonald, Melissa McIntyre, Christina Schmidt, Cassie Steele, Sarah Barrable-Tishauer	Won	
2002	Best Family TV Comedy Series	Degrassi: The Next Generation		Nominated	
2002	Best Performance in a TV Comedy Series Leading Young Actor	Degrassi: The Next Generation	Ryan Cooley	Nominated	
2002	Best Performance in a TV Comedy Series Leading Young Actor	Degrassi: The Next Generation	Jake Goldsbie	Nominated	
2003	Best Ensemble in a TV Series (Comedy or Drama)	Degrassi: The Next Generation	Daniel Clark, Lauren Collins, Ryan Cooley, Jake Epstein, Stacey Farber, Jake Goldsbie, Aubrey Graham, Shane Kippel, Andrea Lewis, Miriam McDonald, Melissa McIntyre, Adamo Ruggiero, Christina Schmidt, Cassie Steele, Sarah Barrable-Tishauer	Nominated	
2003	Best Performance in a TV Comedy Series Leading Young Actor	Degrassi: The Next Generation	Jake Epstein	Won	
2004	Best Family TV Series (Comedy or Drama)	Degrassi: The Next Generation		Won	
2004	Best Performance in a TV Comedy Series Leading Young Actor	Degrassi: The Next Generation	Jake Epstein	Nominated	
2004	Best Performance in a TV Comedy Series Young Actress Age Ten or Younger	Degrassi: The Next Generation	Alex Steele	Nominated	
2005	Best Performance in a TV Comedy Series Leading Young Actor	Degrassi: The Next Generation	Adamo Ruggiero	Nominated	
2005	Best Performance in a TV Comedy Series Supporting Young Actor	Degrassi: The Next Generation	Aubrey Graham	Nominated	
2005	Best Performance in a TV Comedy Series Supporting Young Actress	Degrassi: The Next Generation	Christina Schmidt (Tie with Alia Shawkat of Arrested Development)	Won	
2005	Best Performance in a TV Comedy Series Recurring Young Actress	Degrassi: The Next Generation	Alex Steele	Nominated	
2005	Outstanding Young Performers in a TV Series	Degrassi: The Next Generation	Ryan Cooley, Jake Epstein, Stacey Farber, Aubrey Graham, Miriam McDonald, Adamo Ruggiero, Christina Schmidt, Alex Steele, Cassie Steele, Sarah Barrable-Tishauer	Nominated	
2006	Best Young Ensemble Performance in a TV Series (Comedy or Drama	Degrassi: The Next Generation	Dalmar Abuzeid, John Bregar, Deanna Casaluce, Daniel Clark, Lauren Collins, Ryan Cooley, Marc Donato, Jake Epstein, Stacey Farber, Aubrey Graham, Jake Goldsbie, Shenae Grimes, Jamie Johnston, Shane Kippel, Andrea Lewis, Mike Lobel, Miriam McDonald, Melissa McIntyre, Daniel Morrison, Adamo Ruggiero, Cassie Steele, Sarah Barrable-Tishauer	Nominated	)
2007	Best Performance in a TV Comedy Series Recurring Young Actor	Degrassi: The Next Generation	Marc Donato	Nominated	
2008	Best Performance in a TV Series Leading Young Actor	Degrassi: The Next Generation	Jamie Johnston	Won	
2008	Best Performance in a TV Series Recurring Young Actor	Degrassi: The Next Generation	Marc Donato	Nominated	
2009	Best Performance in a TV Series (Comedy or Drama) Leading Young Actor	Degrassi: The Next Generation	Jamie Johnston	Nominated	
2010	Best Performance in a TV Series (Comedy or Drama) Leading Young Actor	Degrassi: The Next Generation	Jamie Johnston	Nominated	
2010	Best Performance in a TV Series (Comedy or Drama) Supporting Young Actress<	Degrassi: The Next Generation	Aislinn Paul	Nominated	
2010	Best Performance in a TV Series Guest Starring Young Actress	Degrassi: The Next Generation	Laytrel McMullen	Nominated	
2010	Best Performance in a TV Series Recurring Young Actor 14 and Over	Degrassi: The Next Generation	A.J. Saudin	Nominated	
2011	Best Performance in a TV Series Recurring Young Actor	Degrassi	A.J. Saudin	Nominated	
2012	Best Performance in a TV Series Lead Young Actress	Degrassi	Cristine Prosperi	Won	
2012	Best Performance in a TV Series Recurring Young Actor	Degrassi	A.J. Saudin	Won	
2013	Best Performance in a TV Series - Leading Young Actress>	Degrassi	Christine Prosperi	Nominated	
2013	Best Performance in a TV Series - Leading Young Actress	Degrassi	Olivia Scriven	Nominated	
2013	Best Performance in a TV Series - Recurring Young Actor 17-21	Degrassi	Lyle O'Donohoe	Nominated	
2014	Best Performance in a TV Series - Leading Young Actress	Degrassi	Olivia Scriven	Nominated	
2015	Best Performance in a TV Series - Supporting Young Actor	Degrassi	Eric Osborne	Won	

== Young Entertainer Awards ==
The Young Entertainer Awards were first presented in 2016. The awards bring together young performers and their families to honor and celebrate their performance achievements in film, television, music, and stage in an awards show just for young entertainers.

Year	Category	Series	Nominee	Result	Ref
2017	Best Leading Young Actor - Television Series	Degrassi: Next Class	André Dae Kim	Nominated	
2017	Best Leading Young Actor - Television Series	Degrassi: Next Class	Ehren Kassam	Nominated	
2017	Best Leading Young Actor - Television Series	Degrassi: Next Class	Richard Walters	Nominated	
