= Accidents Will Happen (Degrassi: The Next Generation) =

- Degrassi: The Next Generation episodes
- A devastated Manny, after thinking she is pregnant, runs to visit Emma's mother, Spike, for advice.
- Episode nos.: Season 3 Episodes 14 & 15
- Production codes: 314 & 315
- Original air dates: January 26, 2004; 9 February 2004 (Canada); 26 August 2006 (US)
- Running time: 44 minutes

Episode chronology
← Previous "This Charming Man"	Next → "Take On Me"
- Degrassi: The Next Generation (season 3)

"Accidents Will Happen" is a two-part episode from the third season of the Canadian television series Degrassi: The Next Generation. In Canada, the first part aired on CTV on 26 January 2004, and the second part aired on 9 February. The two-part episode follows Manny Santos (Cassie Steele) discovering she is pregnant and ultimately deciding to get an abortion.

The episode is notable due to its discussion of teen pregnancy and abortion. Due to its controversial nature, the episode's American premiere was postponed for two years; it eventually aired on Noggin's programming block for teenagers, The N, on 26 August 2006.

== Synopsis ==
=== Part One ===
Many students have been hit with a stomach flu bug, including Manny Santos (Cassie Steele). Following a gymnastics practice, Manny's best friend Emma (Miriam McDonald) questions why Manny has not had her period yet. Manny discovers she is nine weeks late; it has been ten weeks since she first had sex with sophomore Craig Manning (Jake Epstein). Upon this discovery, compounded with her recent sickness, Manny realizes that she may be pregnant. She then asks Paige Michalchuk (Lauren Collins) for advice who tells Manny to ask Craig if he used a condom.

Meanwhile, Toby (Jake Goldsbie) becomes jealous of J.T.'s (Ryan Cooley) popularity and feels left out when J.T. is invited to go to a concert with Jimmy (Aubrey Graham). In an effort to impress Jimmy, Toby hacks into the school's grade system to change Jimmy's grade from a 61% to an 88%, but he is nearly caught by a teacher; panicked, Toby accidentally changes Jimmy's grade to an 8888%, and he is forced to log back in and change the grade. When Principal Raditch (Dan Woods) discovers Toby logging into the school computer under an administrative's account, he sends both Toby and Jimmy to Saturday detention, the day of the concert.

During the Regionals competition, Manny notices Craig in attendance and, alarmed, falls off the gymnastics beam, ruling Degrassi a forfeit. After the competition, Manny confronts Craig; he admits he didn't wear a condom, as he mistakenly believed Manny was on birth control at the time. Manny confides in Emma's mother, Spike (Amanda Stepto), who became pregnant with Emma at fourteen. Manny eventually takes a pregnancy test and gets a positive result. She tells Spike she does not want to tell her parents, fearing they will send her to a convent in the Philippines like her cousin.

The next day, Manny reveals her pregnancy to Craig and initially expects him to be angry but to her surprise Craig is excited, as he wants to have a family of his own.

=== Part Two ===
Manny schedules a doctor's appointment to confirm her pregnancy. Craig, still excited about the pregnancy, gifts Manny a book of potential names for the baby. When Craig's ex-girlfriend Ashley (Melissa McIntyre) discovers the book, she furiously announces to the whole school that Manny and Craig are going to have a baby. After hearing several snide remarks and comments, Manny breaks down in the bathroom, leading Emma to comfort her; Emma suggests Manny and Craig babysit her baby brother, Jack, to help train them as future parents. Meanwhile, J.T. has finally had enough of Liberty's (Sarah Barrable-Tishauer) crush on him, and he tells her to move on. Liberty grows a crush on Sean (Daniel Clark) after she is paired with him for a history project; Sean rejects Liberty and instead introduces her to his friend, Towerz (Travis Donegan).

Manny and Craig fail miserably at babysitting Jack, but Craig still wants to raise the baby with Manny; she objects, however, deciding that having a baby at this time of her life would ruin her plans for the future. Emma, who is opposed to abortion, becomes furious when Manny wants to get an abortion; she instead encourages Manny to put the baby up for adoption.

Manny argues with Craig after revealing she wants to get an abortion. Emma, overhearing the argument, steps in and defends Manny, stating that while she disapproves of Manny's decision, it is Manny's body and ultimately her choice. Manny tearfully confesses her pregnancy to her mother. Her mother is supportive of the decision and drives her to an abortion clinic.

== Critical reception and reactions ==
Due to the heavy content and the topic of abortion, the two-part episode was considered "too honest" for U.S. viewers; Noggin's teen block, The N, decided not to air the episodes during its summer schedule, and they were subsequently removed from regular rotation. Noggin's director of programming, Meeri Park Cunniff, commented, "It's a serious episode and the summer [schedule] is all lighthearted"; an official network statement added that the move was "unrelated to any policy regarding abortion." The move received backlash from U.S. viewers, who wrote petitions and letters. Jake Epstein, who played Craig Manning, commented that his co-stars were shocked upon The N's announcement. Degrassi creator Linda Schuyler stated, "If they're talking about it in the schoolyard, we should be able to talk about it on television."

Two years after the initial Canadian broadcast, The N aired the episode for the first time in the United States in August 2006 during a marathon of "Cast Picks". Cassie Steele, who played Manny, chose the episode as her "pick". Steele revealed that, following the episode broadcast, she received handwritten letters from girls who related to the story. She described the response as a "touching and fulfilling experience." The episode was aired again in an "every episode" marathon preceding the sixth season premiere; the airing was followed by a segment that featured experts discussing the issues of teen pregnancy and abortion. In the United States, "Accidents Will Happen" was released on the Season 3 DVD box set branded as "The Episode You Can't See on TV."

In a 2017 The Fader article, writer Patrick D. McDermott reflected on the episode's censorship and the portrayal of abortion on television, stating that "American teen shows are still lagging behind in terms of abortion storylines." In an interview with McDermott, former Degrassi writer Shelley Scarrow reflected on The N's decision: "Abortion deserves dramatic representation. It's something that we run into, and yet it's like the third rail—you just don't touch it." In a 2024 retrospective, Schuyler revealed that The N initially had "full support" behind the episode, but expressed hesitancy following the publicity of the March for Women's Lives protest. Schuyler recalled: "There was nervousness on behalf of the broadcaster if it wasn't perhaps the right time to be airing it. We, of course, would disagree with that, but we had to respect our American broadcasters responsible for the American audience."

A 2014 review of the episode by Brandon Nowalk, Pilot Viruet, Sonia Saraiya and David Sims of The A.V. Club was generally positive; Viruet stated that while parts of the episode were "laughable", the abortion topic was "tackled in a nice way." Nowalk praised the scene of Manny revealing the pregnancy to her mother, describing it as "wrenching" and a "testament to the power of Degrassi's earnestness." Sims noted that the episode repeated "Degrassi's most famous storyline", citing the character of Christine "Spike" Nelson's teen pregnancy in Degrassi Junior High. In an Entertainment Weekly article discussing her favorite Degrassi episodes, Linda Schuyler ranked "Accidents Will Happen" at number 3. In 2024, Rolling Stone journalist Gina Wurtz examined the episode's relevance twenty years later, writing: "Since the overturning of Roe v. Wade on June 24, 2022, it's more important than ever that young women have access to information around abortion, which [the episode] provides." In an interview with Wurtz, Schuyler also hoped that audiences would revisit the episode in light of the current political climate, stating "Young women need to see what Manny went through and need to hear all the various points of views."

== See also ==
- "A New Start" - Two-part premiere of Degrassi High that was controversially edited in the United States to remove scenes of anti-abortion protesters
