= Ballingall =

Ballingall is a surname. Notable people with the surname include:

- Chris Ballingall (1932–2025), American baseball player in the All-American Girls Professional Baseball League
- George Ballingall (1780–1855), Scottish physician and surgeon
- Sara Ballingall (born 1973), Canadian actress
