= Bye-Bye, Junior High =

- Degrassi Junior High episode
- Episode no.: Season 3 Episode 16
- Directed by: Kit Hood
- Written by: Yan Moore
- Cinematography by: Phillip Earnshaw
- Editing by: Robert de Lint
- Original air date: March 6, 1989
- Running time: 30 min (plus commercials)

Episode chronology
| ← Previous "Pa-arty!" | Next → "A New Start" |
- List of Degrassi Junior High episodes

"Bye-Bye, Junior High" is the sixteenth episode of the third and final season of Canadian teen drama television series Degrassi Junior High. It originally aired on CBC Television in Canada on March 6, 1989. It was written by Yan Moore and directed by Kit Hood. The episode takes place at the end of the school year as graduation approaches; despite the fallout from the death of his parents at the beginning of the season, Derek "Wheels" Wheeler (Neil Hope) manages to pass, but Christine "Spike" Nelson (Amanda Stepto), who is raising her daughter Emma, must make up for poor grades over the holidays, something which she does not react well to. At the graduation dance, a fault in the boiler room causes a fire to spread throughout the school, razing it to the ground.

The episode received a positive reception from contemporary critics.

== Plot ==
The end of the school year is approaching and the students are taking their final exams. Joey Jeremiah (Pat Mastroianni) is excited to go to the graduation dance with Caitlin Ryan (Stacie Mistysyn), but Joey's mom tells him that he must not get a C, otherwise he won't be able to go, something Joey doesn't tell Caitlin. Christine "Spike" Nelson (Amanda Stepto), who is exhausted and disillusioned taking care of her daughter Emma, arrives at school later to do hers alone with Ms. Avery (Michelle Goodeve). Meanwhile, the school's gas and electricity is under maintenance, but the workers are daunted by the problems and agree to leave barrels of gas in the building. During class, the fire alarm goes off, but it turns out to be a false alarm. Mr. Raditch (Dan Woods) hands Joey his grades personally, two As, four Bs, and one C. Raditch is proud of his improvement from last year. but Joey is forced to cancel his plans with Caitlin because of the one C, which she reacts poorly to.

Derek "Wheels" Wheeler (Neil Hope), whose parents were killed at the beginning of the season, is told to stay behind by Mr. Garcia (Roger Montgomery), and Wheels thinks he failed. However, Garcia tells him he barely passed and that despite being normally recommended to repeat the year, it was in his best interest to stay with his peers. Wheels leaves ecstatic. Meanwhile, Ms. Avery visits Spike at her mother's salon with her grades, which are poor, and recommends she take correspondence classes over the holidays. Spike reacts very poorly to this and balks at the prospect of her having a future while being a teenage mother, blaming Emma for her situation. Avery chastises Spike and tells her she is lucky to be able to have a baby.

Joey comes home depressed about the C, but his mother is impressed with his other grades and allows him to go to the dance after all. At the dance, Joey and Caitlin reunite and reconcile, and Spike approaches Ms. Avery for the forms for her correspondence classes. Two younger students playing tag around the school smell smoke emanating from the boiler room. They investigate the smoke and then open the boiler room door, revealing a massive fire inside that starts to spread towards a group of gas barrels left by the maintenance. The two immediately run back to the gymnasium to warn of the fire but nobody listens to them until the alarm sounds. As the students start leaving the gymnasium, they hear a large explosion and quickly rush out to the front of the school to witness a large fire spreading through the building. Caitlin doesn't see Joey and starts panicking until he arrives and embraces her, and everyone watches horrified as the fire rages through the school.

== Production ==
The school used in the series was the Vincent Massey Junior School building on Daisy Avenue in Etobicoke, Ontario. By the end of the series' production, Linda Schuyler recalled that the four classrooms used in the show were "bursting at the seams", In what Schuyler calls a "bold" move, a decision was made to burn down the fictional school for the series finale. As it was a real location, the scenes of the burning school were created via special effects. According to director Phillip Earnshaw, a photographic plate was shot of the school building, and sent to a special effects company who created a cut-out of the building with open windows and filmed the flames through the windows. The film was then sent back and superimposed onto the shot of the school building, creating the effect of the school being on fire.

== Release ==
The episode was given an advance screening at the Royal Ontario Museum on January 27, 1989. The episode aired on CBC Television at 8:30.p.m on February 27, 1989. In Australia, it aired at 5:30pm on October 10, 1989 on ABC-TV.

== Critical reception ==
Writing for the Montreal Gazette, Janice Kennedy praised the episode, calling it "artful, tightly scripted, [and] entertaining", but noted that a "colossally poor bit of directing and/or editing" made character Joey Jeremiah look missing during the scene of the school burning down, appearing to end the series on a "Who shot J.R.?"-style cliffhanger. Toronto Star's Greg Quill made a similar comparison to the "Who shot J.R.?" cliffhanger. He also added that while the episode had a "doubly bitter taste of finality", it nonetheless was one of the "most sincere and heartwarming" episodes of the series, as it showcased how both the cast and crew had matured over time.

== Home media ==
The episode was released on DVD as part of the Degrassi Junior High: Season 3 DVD box set by WGBH Boston on September 27, 2005.
