= Degrassi: Next Class =

Canadian teen drama television series (2016–2017)

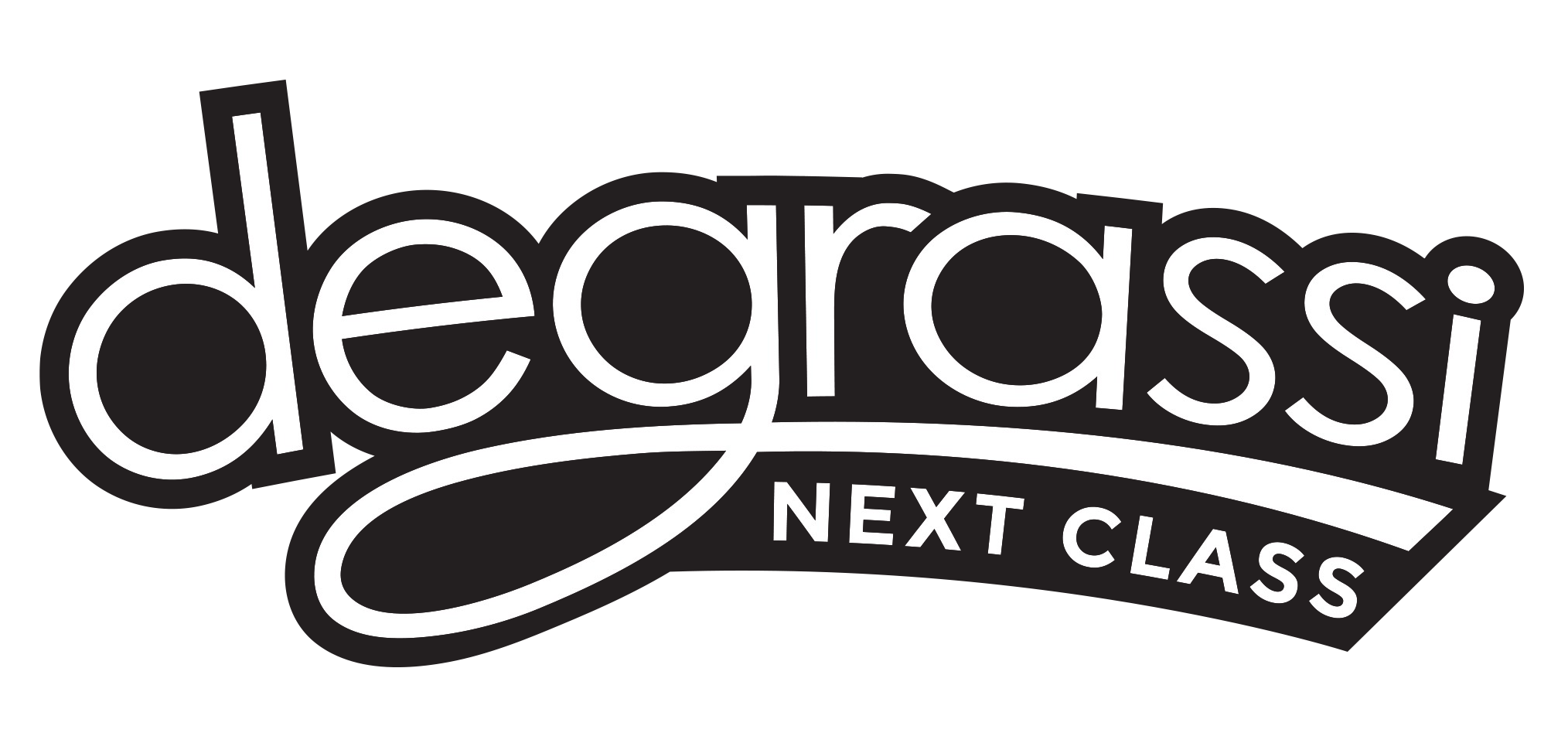
- Genre: Teen drama
- Created by: Linda Schuyler; Yan Moore; Stephen Stohn; Sarah Glinski; Matt Huether
- Showrunners: Sarah Glinski; Matt Huether
- Starring: See cast
- Theme music composer: Jody Colero; Jim McGrath; Shobha; Stephen Stohn; Rob Wells
- Opening theme: "Whatever It Takes"
- Composers: Jim McGrath; Tim Welch
- Country of origin: Canada
- Original language: English
- No. of seasons: 4
- No. of episodes: 40 (list of episodes)

Production
- Executive producers: Linda Schuyler; Stephen Stohn; Sarah Glinski; Matt Huether; Steven DeNure; Anne Loi; Josh Scherba
- Producers: Stefan Brogren; Courtney Jane Walker; Stephanie Williams
- Production locations: Toronto, Ontario
- Cinematography: Mitchell T. Ness
- Editors: Jason B. Irvine; Nicholas Wong
- Running time: 24 minutes
- Production companies: DHX Media; DHX Studios Toronto

Original release
- Network: Family Channel; Family Channel App
- Release: January 4, 2016 – July 7, 2017

Related
- The Kids of Degrassi Street Degrassi Junior High Degrassi High Degrassi: The Next Generation; Degrassi Talks School's Out

Degrassi: Next Class is a Canadian teen drama television series primarily created by Linda Schuyler. The fifth and to date most recent series in the Degrassi franchise and a direct sequel to Degrassi: The Next Generation, it premiered on Family Channel's new teen programming block F2N in Canada on January 4, 2016, and was released on Netflix internationally on January 25, 2016.

The series follows most of the same characters that had debuted in the final four seasons of the previous series, as well as introducing new characters. Intended as the fifteenth season of Degrassi: The Next Generation, it was later retooled to be a reboot that would appeal to the emerging Generation Z. Like its predecessor, the series was filmed at the Epitome Pictures studios in Toronto, Ontario.

The fourth season, released to Netflix in July 2017, was the last; in March 2019, show producer and frequent director Stefan Brogren alluded to the show's cancellation in a tweet.

== Development ==
=== Concept ===
Degrassi: Next Class was intended to be the fifteenth season of Degrassi: The Next Generation. In an interview with Vice, Linda Schuyler, one of the co-creators of the Degrassi franchise and a co-founder of Epitome Pictures, stated: "We realized that the kids we're talking to today are a new generation from the kids we talked to in 2001 when we came out with Degrassi: The Next Generation. Then, we were very much talking to millennials. There's a new generation, Generation Z, who weren't even born when we started that show. That was a very sobering fact...We've done a lot of research into Generation Z and decided we need a reboot."

When Degrassi: The Next Generation ended its run on TeenNick in the United States, the producers sought out other means to distribute the Next Class series and later made a deal with Netflix.

=== Crew ===
The series was created and executive produced by Linda Schuyler, Stephen Stohn, Sarah Glinski, and Matt Huether and produced by DHX Studios Toronto (a subsidiary of DHX Media). Epitome Pictures, DHX Media, and Netflix jointly produced the series with funding from the Shaw Rocket Fund, Royal Bank of Canada and the Cogeco Program Development Fund.

Continuing with Next Class, Sarah Glinski and Matt Huether served as head story editors for the show. Other writers included Courtney Jane Walker, Alejandro Alcoba, Cole Bastedo. Jennifer Kassabian and Ian MacIntyre. Other directors for the series included cast member and producer Stefan Brogren, Eleanor Lindo, Phil Earnshaw, and Rt!.

=== Episode format ===
Each episode of Degrassi: Next Class is written following the same formula with three storylines (Plot A, Plot B and Plot C). The problems and issues presented in the episode are not always resolved by the end of the episode, and are carried over throughout the season, creating a mini-arc. With "Next Class", some episodes have the plots follow a common theme. This concept originated in Degrassi Junior High and Degrassi High. Episode titles feature a "#" in the front of each episode title and occasionally refer to social media trends of the time.

=== Opening sequence ===
The opening sequence of Next Class adopted a 30-second format, in contrast to the heavily abridged sequence in the later seasons of The Next Generation. Stephen Stohn explained to TV Insider that while they wouldn't be necessarily returning to the "little vignettes of the characters" from earlier seasons, the new opening sequence would be "very reflective of Generation Z and how tuned-in they are to technology." The opening comes after a two-to three-minute cold open but does not follow the characters around the school. Instead, a montage of videos and pictures from the characters social media accounts cycle across the screen. Like the final two seasons of Degrassi, instead of listing every ensemble actor in the opening, episodes only credit the regular actors appearing in that episode.

The opening sequence features a "more amped up, more electronic" update of "Whatever It Takes", the theme music written for Degrassi: The Next Generation, this time produced by Rob Wells and Shobha, with the latter on vocals.

=== Filming locations ===
Degrassi: Next Class was filmed at Epitome Pictures' then-four soundstages and backlot located at the company's 100,000-square-foot (9,300 m^{2}) production studios in Toronto, the same studio where Degrassi: The Next Generation was filmed. The facade of Degrassi Community School was the exterior of Studio C, and used the same colours and glass pattern as Centennial College, which was used to depict the school during Degrassi High.

The area in front of this facade featured a "hoarding area" where students would gather, a street, and a bus stop across the road. The studio's backlot was used for exterior shots of the characters' houses, which was one unit dressed differently for each house, and The Dot Grill. The building for The Dot was the only one on the backlot large enough to allow filming inside; scenes taking places inside the school and house interiors were filmed on one of four sound stages.

Studio A contained sets for the school's hallways, washrooms, cafeteria and classrooms. The hallways were stenciled with phrases such as "the perfect human being is all human", which were found at the Etobicoke School for the Arts, one of the many schools that set designers used during their original research. The washroom set was used for the girls' and boys' room; urinals were installed and removed as needed." It was also used as the studio's cafeteria where the cast and crew eat.

In addition to being used as the exterior of the school, Studio C held sets for the school's entrance foyer, the gymnasium, the media lab and a hallway with lockers. As the franchise progressed and the budget increased, a stairway and balcony was installed in the foyer in an attempt to get characters off the floor and not all appear in the same geometric plane. For the first few seasons of The Next Generation, the gym floor was made of real wooden floorboards; due to warping, it was replaced by concrete painted to look like wood.

Studio B contained the sets for the characters' houses. The fourth studio, Studio D, housed all the production offices, dressing rooms, and make-up and hair departments.

For the new series, Next Class, the interior of the school set saw a major facelift. New doors were added for all classrooms, room numbers were placed on doors, classrooms were remodeled to be more modern which included new "smart-boards" and high-definition television sets (also placed throughout the hallways, cafeteria and gym), and the lockers were repainted for a more "retro" look. Several new sets were also added which include: a new student lounge room, an area called the "conversation pit", a remodeled classroom for Digital arts, and a restaurant called "Lola's Cantina".

=== Cancellation ===
In March 2019, Stefan Brogren alluded to the show's cancellation in a tweet. Sara Waisglass, who played Frankie Hollingsworth, recalled to the Toronto Star in 2022 that she was disappointed at the cancellation and revealed: "They never told us anything. We had our contracts and the way it worked was they had to tell you by a certain date if we were picked up or not. We just never heard from them again."

== Premise ==
Like its predecessors, the series follows an ensemble cast of underclassmen students at Degrassi Community School, most of whom face different challenges that were once seen as taboo such as discrimination, sex, teen pregnancy, bullying, date rape, drug abuse, mental health, self-image, sexuality, self-injury, suicide, abortion, domestic violence, death, racism, sexism, ableism, homophobia, transphobia, gun violence, and social media.

== Cast ==
=== Main ===
Starting with season 1 of Next Class, none of the characters who debuted during the changes happening in seasons eight and nine of The Next Generation remain. The first and second seasons featured 19 regular roles, with 14 cast members returning from season 14 of Degrassi and 5 new regulars: Amir Bageria (Baaz Nahir), Soma Bhatia (Goldi Nahir), Jamie Bloch (Yael Baron), Chelsea Clark (Esme Song), and Dante Scott (Vijay Maraj). Keeping ties to the early seasons of the previous incarnation and the franchise as a whole, Stefan Brogren's character Archie Simpson remains the Principal of Degrassi Community School. Seasons three and four added two regulars to the cast, as casting calls were made public through Larissa Mair Casting.

On October 21, 2016, it was confirmed that the cast members in a photo executive producer Stephen Stohn posted were the ones leaving the cast at the end of season four. This includes: Eric Osborne (Miles Hollingsworth III), Ricardo Hoyos (Zig Novak), André Dae Kim (Winston Chu), Ehren Kassam (Jonah Haak), Ana Golja (Zoe Rivas), Lyle Lettau (Tristan Milligan), Nikki Gould (Grace Cardinal), Olivia Scriven (Maya Matlin), Richard Walters (Tiny Bell) and Bhatia.

=== Guest appearances ===
Several recurring cast members from the previous incarnation continued their roles in Degrassi: Next Class, a majority being the parents and teachers of the students at Degrassi Community School. David Sutcliffe of Gilmore Girls fame appeared in a season one episode as himself. In season 2, several original Degrassi: The Next Generation cast members made guest appearances for the 500th episode of the Degrassi franchise. These cast members include Adamo Ruggiero as Marco Del Rossi, Miriam McDonald as Emma Nelson, Lauren Collins as Paige Michalchuk, Shane Kippel as Gavin "Spinner" Mason, and Sarah Barrable-Tishauer as Liberty Van Zandt. Jamie Johnston, who portrayed Peter Stone in seasons five through ten of Degrassi: The Next Generation, also made his return for the second season, appearing in several episodes. Other previous cast members that appeared include Raymond Ablack as Sav Bhandari, Charlotte Arnold as Holly J. Sinclair, Jake Epstein as Craig Manning, and Jacob Neayem as Mo Mashkour. In season 3 and 4, Chloe Rose reprised her role for three episodes as Katie Matlin. Epstein also made a return guest appearance in season 4.

== Episodes ==
Season	Episodes	Originally released (Canada)		Netflix release dates (U.S.)
Season	Episodes	First released	Last released	Netflix release dates (U.S.)
1	10	January 4, 2016	January 15, 2016	January 15, 2016
2	10	July 19, 2016	September 20, 2016	July 22, 2016
3	10	January 9, 2017	January 20, 2017	January 6, 2017
4	10	July 3, 2017 (Note: The fourth season was released on the Family Channel app to stream on June 30, 2017, four days before its debut on the channel.)	July 14, 2017	July 7, 2017

== Release ==
In Canada, the series premiered on January 4, 2016, on Family Channel's new teen programing block, F2N. In the United States (and internationally), first-run episodes began streaming internationally on Netflix on January 15, 2016 (excluding Canada, Australia and France). Episodes will be available on Netflix in Canada, Australia and France following the conclusion of the first season. Season two premiered on the Family Channel on July 19, 2016, and on Netflix on July 22, 2016.

In Australia, the series premiered on ABC3 on May 16, 2016. The second season immediately followed the first season on ABC3 in Australia on May 30. On January 6, 2017, Netflix added seasons 1–3 to the Australian catalogue. Season 3 began streaming online on Netflix before its debut on ABC3, starting April 22, 2017.

In South Africa, the series premiered on SABC 1 (South African Broadcasting Corporation), on 6 April 2020, airing 15:00 Monday to Thursday.
