= Degrassi High =

Canadian teen drama television series (1989–1991)

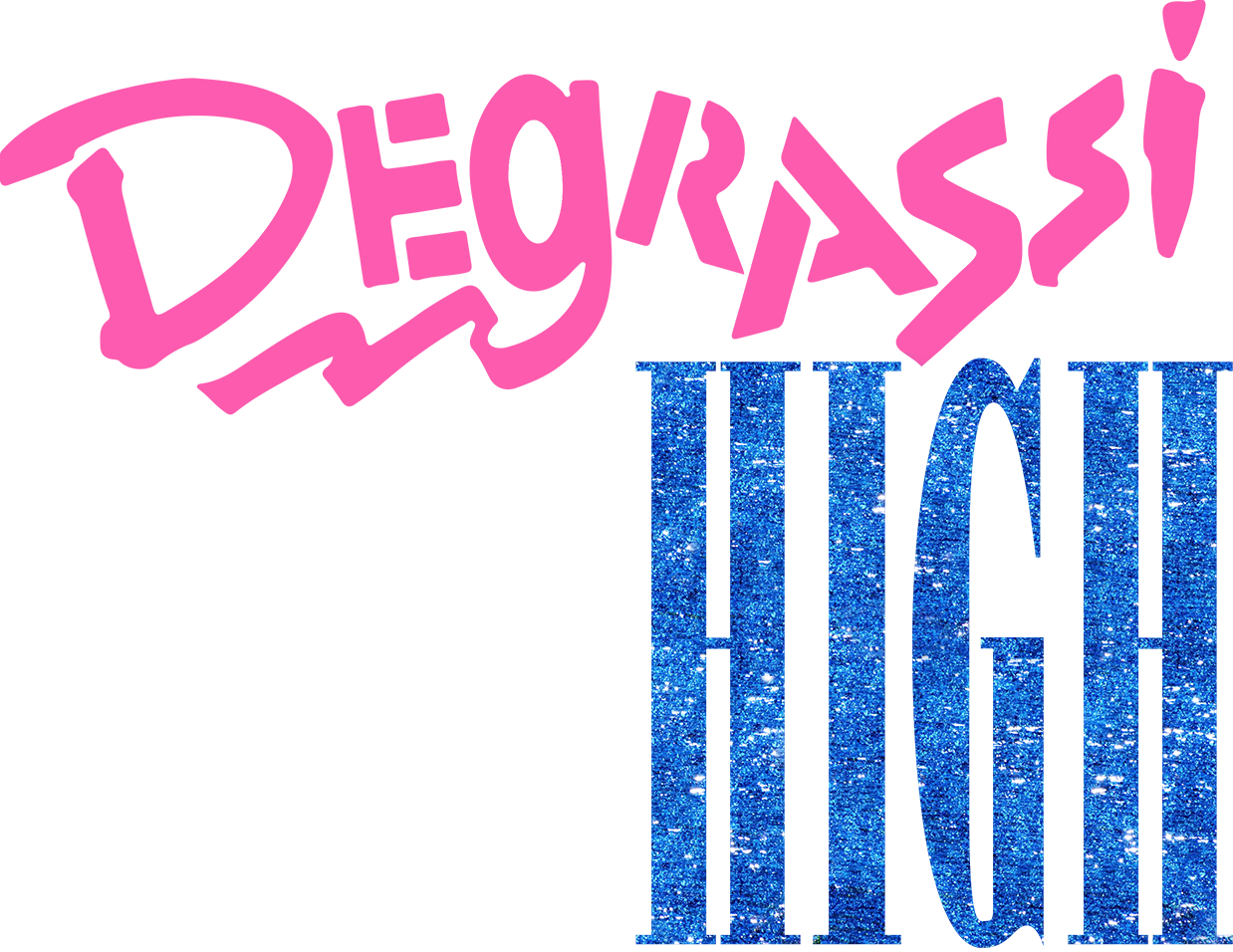
- Genre: Teen drama
- Created by: Linda Schuyler; Kit Hood
- Starring: See cast here
- Country of origin: Canada
- Original language: English
- No. of seasons: 2
- No. of episodes: 28 (list of episodes)

Production
- Running time: 30 minutes (including commercials)
- Production company: Playing With Time, Inc.

Original release
- Network: CBC Television (Canada); PBS (United States)
- Release: November 6, 1989 – February 18, 1991

Related
- The Kids of Degrassi Street; Degrassi Junior High; Degrassi: The Next Generation; School's Out

Degrassi High is a Canadian teen drama television series created by Linda Schuyler and Kit Hood. It is the third entry in the Degrassi franchise and the direct continuation of Degrassi Junior High, and was broadcast on the CBC from November 6, 1989 to February 18, 1991.

The series follows the lives of those attending the titular fictional school. It addresses a variety of topics, ranging from mundane coming-of-age dilemmas to serious and controversial topics such as abortion, cancer, suicide and HIV/AIDS. It was filmed entirely on-location in Toronto, with the Centennial College Story Arts Centre used as the school. The series was critically acclaimed, with particular praise afforded to the series premiere, "A New Start", which portrayed abortion. A small controversy arose involving the episode when PBS removed a scene of anti-abortion protesters against the wishes of Hood and Schuyler. The show received six awards, including a Prix Jeunesse and four Chris Awards, and seven nominations, including for several actors.

The end of the series, despite good ratings, was the result of multiple behind-the-scenes problems, including creative exhaustion and the aging cast, which led to the loss of its funding. as well as the feeling that the show had run its course. A post-graduation television film, School's Out, and a non-fiction docuseries, Degrassi Talks, appeared in 1992 and officially ended the franchise until its revival with Degrassi: The Next Generation (2001–2015).

== Cast ==
As a continuation of Degrassi Junior High, the series does not feature a definitive cast billing. Many principal, recurring, and minor cast members of the previous series reprise their roles, including:

- Pat Mastroianni as Joey Jeremiah
- Stacie Mistysyn as Caitlin Ryan
- Amanda Stepto as Christine "Spike" Nelson
- Stefan Brogren as Archie "Snake" Simpson
- Neil Hope as Derek "Wheels" Wheeler
- Anais Granofsky as Lucy Fernandez
- Angela and Maureen Deiseach as Erica and Heather Farrell
- Duncan Waugh as Arthur Kobalewscuy
- Siluck Saysanasy as Yick Yu
- Rebecca Haines-Saah as Kathleen Mead
- Sara Ballingall as Melanie Brodie
- Cathy Keenan as Liz O'Rourke
- Dayo Ade as BLT (Bryant Lester Thomas)
- Irene Courakos as Alexa Pappadopoulos
- Michael Carry as Simon Dexter
- Darrin Brown as Dwayne Myers
- Maureen McKay as Michelle Acette
- Christopher Charlesworth as Scooter Webster

=== Additions ===
- David Armin-Parcells as Claude Tanner, who briefly dates Caitlin Ryan. When they are caught spray-painting messages on the wall of a nuclear power plant in protest, he escapes without helping Caitlin over the fence, leading to her arrest. He commits suicide in season two.
- Byrd Dickens as Scott Smith, a senior student who begins dating Kathleen Mead; it later transpires that he is violently abusive, and eventually Kathleen breaks up with him.
- Vincent Walsh as Patrick, an Irish-born student who briefly dates Spike. In season two, they break up offscreen, and he briefly dates Liz, much to Spike's chagrin.
- L. Dean Ifill as Basil "Bronco" Davis, president of the student council, who later starts dating Lucy.

== Development ==
A promotional image of the cast of Degrassi High. Back row L-R: Siluck Saysanasy, Darrin Brown, Anais Granofsky, Stefan Brogren, and Amanda Stepto. Front row clockwise from left: Dayo Ade, Pat Mastroianni, Cathy Keenan, and Stacie Mistysyn.

=== Concept and creation ===
Degrassi Junior High, which was created by Linda Schuyler and Kit Hood, premiered on the CBC on 18 January 1987 and garnered widespread acclaim from critics for its realistic portrayal of teenage issues. It won several accolades, including an International Emmy Award in 1987, and four Gemini Awards in 1988. Schuyler mentioned the prospects of continuing the show with a high school setting on multiple occasions.

In April 1988, Schuyler mentioned to the Toronto Star that while she was concentrated on the third season of Degrassi Junior High, a high school continuation was a "probability". In November 1988, she told the Montreal Gazette that while the cast worked well together for a sequel to work, "the demographics for CBC favor staying with Junior High — so do we get an all-new cast? Or do I retire and go to tennis camp in the Caribbean?"

It was decided to continue with Degrassi High so that more serious and complex issues could be dealt with, including abortion, which was addressed in the series premiere. According to Schuyler: "As the kids get older, the only way we can remain true to this age group is by growing with them. Therefore, the issues get more complex."

On 10 January 1989, Greg Quill of the Toronto Star reported that a spokesman for the producers confirmed the development of Degrassi High, but then reported on 27 February that no decision had been reportedly made about a sequel. On 13 May 1989, Sid Adilman reported in the Toronto Star that filming for Degrassi High would begin soon.

In the series finale of Degrassi Junior High, the titular school is destroyed in a fire. To keep the entire cast together, a creative decision was made to move the younger students displaced by the fire to the new school to join those that had already graduated. Conversely, the grade 7 students introduced in the third season of Degrassi Junior High were accelerated to grade 9 for an unspecified reason. To give the series a "harder-edged feel", several older characters were introduced.

Reflecting the growing independence of the aging characters, Degrassi High began to give more focus to the characters' lives outside of school, with scenes taking place at nighttime, on the street, or at the characters' jobs. In contrast to Degrassi Junior High, in which the extras were still made known to the viewers, the newer series would include a team of "extra extras", who would simply appear for no other purpose than to fill the background.

=== Filming ===
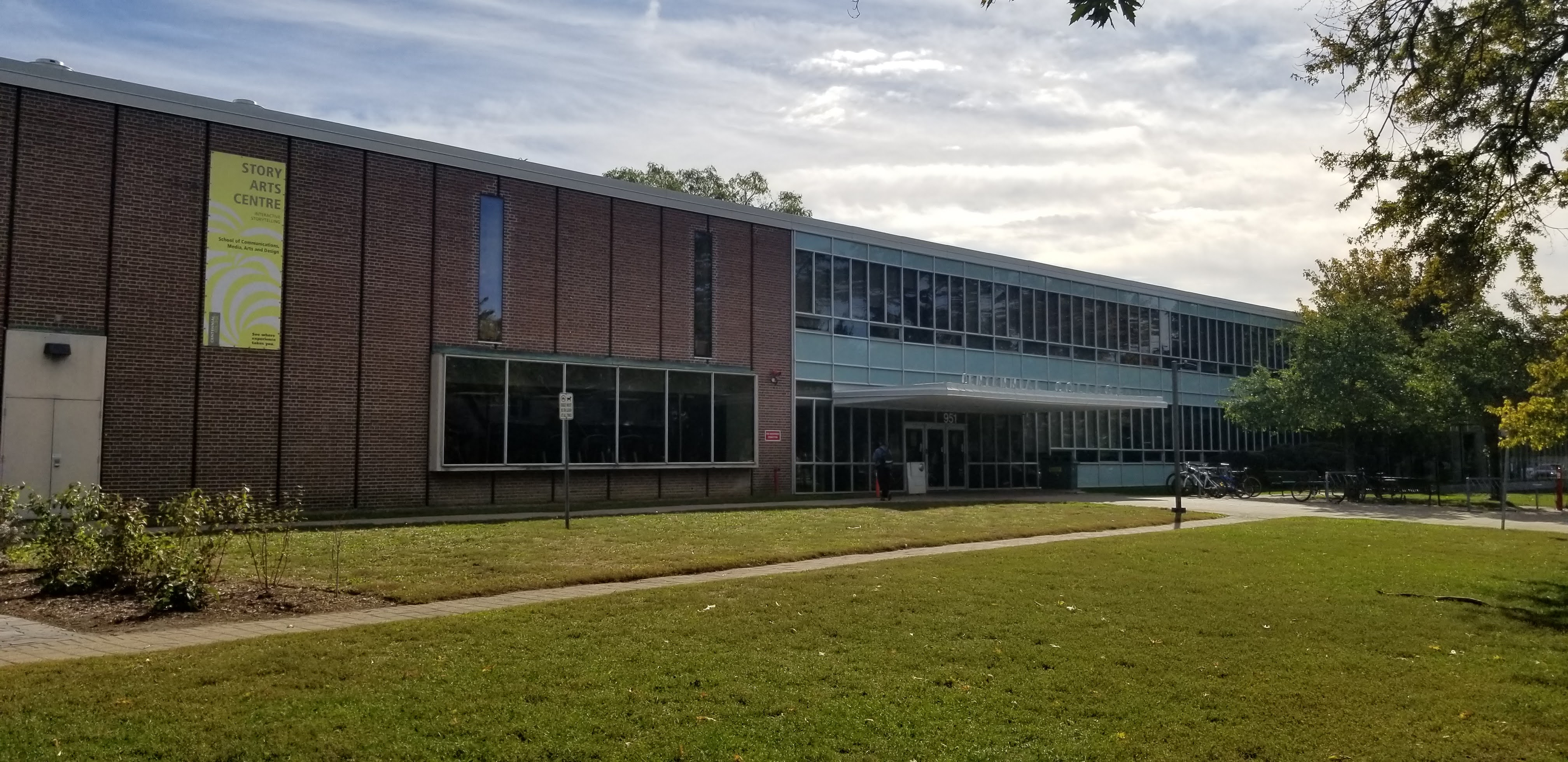
The Centennial College Story Arts Centre, where Degrassi High was filmed, pictured in 2022.

Filming for Degrassi High started in May 1989, and ended in October 1990. The series was filmed at the Story Arts Centre of Centennial College, located on Toronto's Carlaw Avenue. Formerly a teacher's college, the building was previously used to hold auditions for Ida Makes a Movie, the first episode of The Kids of Degrassi Street and the first installment of the Degrassi franchise, in 1979. The building was chosen as despite being part of a college, it more closely resembled a high school. Other filming locations included the Rose Donut Shop on Carlaw Avenue, where character Michelle Accette briefly works after moving away from her conservative father.

=== Opening sequence ===
The Degrassi High theme song, composed by Lewis Manne and Wendy Watson and sung by Watson. is a reworking of the Degrassi Junior High theme song, this time transposed to a different key. It follows the same format as its predecessor, with various scenes of characters in and around the school, omitting individual cast credits. The opening sequence ends with a zooming shot of a girl's backside as the logo is displayed.

The opening sequence contains scenes not included in the final cut, such as a shot of Arthur Kobalewscuy reacting to peanut butter smeared all over his bike; Kit Hood later said the scene and plotline surrounding it did not make the cut as the actor had grown too much to be a believable bullying victim.

=== Sets and design ===
According to Kathryn Ellis, "A Degrassi character's bedroom is the most telling set for that character". The bedroom of character Lucy Fernandez was made from drywall and located in the school library, with her bed being the same used in other character's bedrooms. The childhood bedroom of character Liz O'Rourke, seen in a dream sequence in an episode where the character struggles with memories of her childhood sexual abuse, was made to look "larger than life" to make the young Liz seem extremely small, with the walls being painted blue for a "cool, almost cold atmosphere". For the bedroom of character Arthur Kobalewscuy, various items from the previous series were re-used, as well as rock posters of the fictional group Gourmet Scum, to indicate that the character was maturing in his tastes.

== End of the series ==
Despite its continued critical and commercial acclaim, multiple factors contributed to the end of Degrassi in 1991. Kit Hood had become exhausted and frustrated by television work, having reluctantly agreed to the second season of Degrassi High "to please the network and fans", and the partnership between Hood and Schuyler, both creatively and personally, was deteriorating. Schuyler detailed in her memoir The Mother of All Degrassi that Hood was becoming increasingly temperamental towards the end of production; when learning of the second season renewal, he accused Schuyler of manipulating him and head writer Yan Moore into doing "a year's work that we don't want to do". Compounding this was WGBH's difficulty procuring funding from the PBS's children's department due to the aging cast, and consequently being forced to withdraw from the show.

In spite of these mounting issues, both Hood and Schuyler felt the series had run its course and wanted it to end before it became stale and predictable. In a 1990 news interview, Schuyler explained that they wanted to end the series "while we were still feeling good about what we were doing", and that if they were to continue the series, they would have to "completely re-vamp it" and "bring in a new set of characters", something they did not want to do. Schuyler noted that most of the cast were occupied with post-secondary education, and that she felt the show had already tackled what they had aimed to. In a 1998 web interview with fan site owner Natalie Earl, Hood elaborated:

The kids were getting older and we had covered every conceivable topic. The most prominent characters were graduating and we didn't feel comfortable with introducing a new class. We could have used Joey, as it was established that he had flunked a grade, (we could have kept on flunking him, I guess) but what were we supposed to with the other actors? What was the point, other than to drag out the show? The show had run its course. We wanted to get out while it was still hot. We didn't want to reach the point where the viewers could predict that show's formula and outcomes.

Schuyler informed CBC programming chief Ivan Fecan that they would not be able to produce any more of Degrassi High. Fecan enthusiastically accepted Schuyler's proposal to end the series with a feature-length film.

== Episodes ==
=== Season 1 (1989–1990) ===
No. overall	No. in season	Title	Directed by	Written by	Original release date	Prod. code
1	1	"A New Start: Part 1"	Kit Hood	Yan Moore	November 6, 1989	101
2	2	"A New Start: Part 2"	Kit Hood	Yan Moore	November 6, 1989	102
3	3	"Breaking Up Is Hard to Do"	Kit Hood	Susin Nielsen	November 13, 1989	103
4	4	"Dream On"	John Bertram	Yan Moore	November 20, 1989	104
5	5	"Everybody Wants Something"	Kit Hood	Yan Moore	November 27, 1989	105
6	6	"Nobody's Perfect"	Eleanor Lindo	Susin Nielsen	December 5, 1989	106
7	7	"Just Friends"	Kit Hood	Kathryn Ellis	December 12, 1989	107
8	8	"Little White Lies"	John Bertram	Susin Nielsen	December 19, 1989	108
9	9	"Sixteen: Part 1"	Kit Hood	Yan Moore	January 9, 1990	109
10	10	"Sixteen: Part 2"	Kit Hood	Yan Moore	January 9, 1990	110
11	11	"All in a Good Cause"	Eleanore Lindo	Susin Nielsen	January 16, 1990	111
12	12	"Natural Attraction"	Kit Hood	Yan Moore	January 23, 1990	112
13	13	"Testing One, Two, Three.."	John Bertram	Susin Nielsen	January 30, 1990	113
14	14	"It Creeps!!"	Kit Hood	Yan Moore	February 6, 1990	114
15	15	"Stressed Out"	John Bertram	Yan Moore	February 13, 1990	115

=== Season 2 (1990–1991) ===
No. overall	No. in season	Title	Directed by	Written by	Original release date	Prod. code
16	1	"Bad Blood: Part 1"	Kit Hood	Yan Moore	November 5, 1990	201
17	2	"Bad Blood: Part 2"	Kit Hood	Yan Moore	November 12, 1990	202
18	3	"Loyalties"	John Bertram	Susin Nielsen	November 19, 1990	203
19	4	"A Tangled Web"	Kit Hood	Yan Moore	November 26, 1990	204
20	5	"Body Politics"	Phillip Earnshaw	Susin Nielsen	December 3, 1990	205
21	6	"Crossed Wires"	Kit Hood	Yan Moore	December 10, 1990	206
22	7	"The All-Nighter"	Eleanore Lindo	Kathryn Ellis	January 7, 1991	207
23	8	"Home Sweet Home"	Kit Hood	Susin Nielsen	January 14, 1991	208
24	9	"Extracurricular Activities"	John Bertram	Yan Moore	January 21, 1991	209
25	10	"Showtime: Part 1"	Kit Hood	Yan Moore	January 28, 1991	210
26	11	"Showtime: Part 2"	Kit Hood	Yan Moore	February 4, 1991	211
27	12	"Three's a Crowd"	Phillip Earnshaw	Susin Nielsen	February 11, 1991	212
28	13	"One Last Dance"	Kit Hood	Yan Moore	February 18, 1991	213

== Release ==
=== First-run broadcast ===
Degrassi High premiered on November 6, 1989, on CBC with the two-part episode "A New Start", a week following the documentary Degrassi Between Takes. In the United States, the series debuted on January 14, 1990, on PBS. In Australia, it debuted on ABC TV on September 2, 1990. On the ABC, broadcasts of the series were preceded with a disclaimer that read: "Viewer Advice: The following episode of Degrassi High contains themes appropriate to a teenage audience. Some parents may consider it inappropriate for younger children". Re-runs aired on ABC-TV until 1995.

=== Post-broadcast distribution ===
The series continued in re-runs on CBC during the late 1990s. On September 1, 1997, the series debuted on Showcase, where it aired back-to-back with Degrassi Junior High.

=== Home media and streaming ===
The series was released on VHS by WGBH-TV Boston Home Video in the United States in March 2000, both as separate tapes containing two episodes each and a full box set. It was released as part of the Degrassi High: The Complete Collection DVD box set by WGBH in October 2007. and the Degrassi High Collection set by Force Entertainment in Australia in March 2008.

In July 2023, Degrassi High and School's Out were made available on Amazon Prime Video in Canada, Australia, and New Zealand.

Season	Set details	DVD release dates			Special features
Season	Set details	Region 1	Region 2	Region 4	Special features
Degrassi High: The Complete Series	Discs: 4; Episodes: 29; 1.33:1 aspect ratio	October 9, 2007 December 13, 2016			Region 1: Pop Quiz! - Degrassi High trivia; Degrassi High wallpaper; Printable materials for educators; Printable cast interviews
Degrassi High Collection	Discs: 5 (includes School's Out on separate disc); Episodes: 29; 1.33:1 aspect ratio			March 12, 2008	N/A

== Reception and impact ==
=== Critical reception ===
As with Degrassi Junior High, Degrassi High was largely acclaimed by critics for many of the same reasons as the previous series. The premiere episode, "A New Start". which centres on a student becoming pregnant and deciding to have an abortion, was a particular point of praise. Writing for the Toronto Star, Antonia Zerbisias acclaimed the episode and called it "a gutsy show, particularly in the light of the current political and emotional climate [of the 1980s]", and singled out the even-handed portrayal of abortion and the polarisation surrounding the topic. She wrote that if the show was an American prime time show, "the whole thing would turn out to be a hilarious mix-up. We'd have lots of eye-rolling, sophomoric one-liners about burgeoning bellies and then ooops! Turns out the smart alec kid brother merely murdered the bunny for a school science project."

Writing for The Province, Lee Bacchus had mixed feelings about the debut. While feeling the show continued its predecessor's realism, Bacchus felt that it simplified the issue to "the bumper-sticker level of righteous moralism" and "lofty platitudes".

Overall reviews of the series were similarly positive. Writing for The Age, Margaret Geddes declared that the series gave Australian soap operas such as Neighbours and Home and Away "a run for their money", but unlike the "trite morality plays" she felt were pervasive in those shows, Degrassi High was more realistic and thoughtful. She noted a comparison between the series and the British series Grange Hill.

Writing for The Los Angeles Times, Lynne Heffley declared that Degrassi High had proved itself to be one of the "gutsiest shows on television". Profiling the show in the lead-up to the debut of its final season, Kelli Pryor of Entertainment Weekly wrote: "In a television landscape where the high jinks of characters like the Fox network’s Parker Lewis often define high school life, Degrassi stands out as the thirtysomething of the book-bag set."

=== Censorship ===
The series premiere was shown uncensored on CBC. In the United States, scenes of anti-abortion protesters were removed by PBS. Kate Taylor, co-producer of the series and of WGBH Educational Foundation, defended this as an "[a]esthetic decision" that made for a "more powerful, more poignant" ending. This was done without the permission of Playing With Time, the show's production company, with Kit Hood denouncing it as "an American ending -- happy, safe but incomplete" and requesting his name be removed from the PBS broadcast credits.

Likewise, when the series re-ran on Noggin's teen block The N in 2005, "A New Start" was omitted, as well as the third episode "Breaking Up Is Hard To Do", as it referenced the events of "A New Start". When the episode "It Creeps!", which centres around several students shooting a horror movie in the school, aired on ABC-TV in Australia in 1991, various scenes depicting graphic violence were removed. When the episode was shown again unedited on ABC2 on March 28, 2009, two viewers complained.
