= Darrin Brown =

Canadian actor

- Born: October 28, 1970 (age 55); Toronto, Ontario, Canada

Darrin Brown (born October 28, 1970) is a Canadian 1st Assistant Director and former actor best known for his role as Dwayne Myers on the Degrassi television series.

Brown was born in Toronto, Ontario. In 1992, Brown received a Bachelor of Applied Arts degree in Radio and Television Arts from Ryerson Polytechnical Institute (now Toronto Metropolitan University). Currently, Brown works predominantly in film as an assistant director.
