= Sara Ballingall =

Canadian former actress

- Born: July 13, 1973 (age 52); Toronto, Ontario, Canada
- Known for: Playing Melanie Brodie in the Degrassi franchise
- Television: Degrassi Junior High, Degrassi High

Sara Ballingall (born 13 July 1973) is a Canadian former actress. She is best known for playing Melanie Brodie in the teen drama television series Degrassi Junior High and Degrassi High.

== Acting career ==
On Degrassi, Ballingall played the role of Melanie Brodie, a "skinny schoolgirl with crooked teeth" who had romantic feelings towards Archie "Snake" Simpson, played by Stefan Brogren. She was named a UNICEF Goodwill Ambassador along with her co-stars in April 1989. Ballingall left the series in 1990.

== Sources ==
- Ellis, Kathryn (2005). The official 411 Degrassi generations. Fenn Pub. Co. ISBN 1-55168-278-8. OCLC 59136593.
