= Kit Hood =

Canadian filmmaker and co-creator of Degrassi (1943–2020)

- Hood at the 3rd Gemini Awards in December 1988
- Born: Christopher Hood; 24 March 1943; London, England
- Died: 20 January 2020 (aged 76); West Lawrencetown, Nova Scotia, Canada
- Years active: 1978-1998
- Notable work: The Kids of Degrassi Street, Degrassi Junior High, Degrassi High
- Awards: awards list

Christopher "Kit" Hood (24 March 1943 – 20 January 2020) was an English-born Canadian filmmaker who co-created the Degrassi television franchise and its first three entries: The Kids of Degrassi Street (1979–86), Degrassi Junior High (1987–89), and Degrassi High (1989-91), as well serving as the writer and/or director of the majority of their episodes. As a director, Hood won a Gemini Award in 1987 for the Degrassi Junior High episode "It's Late".

Born in London, he emigrated to Canada in 1969 and worked as a freelance editor before meeting ex-schoolteacher Linda Schuyler, with whom he founded the company Playing With Time in 1976. Outside of Degrassi, the company produced educational films and documentaries. He split from Schuyler in the early 1990s and was not involved with Degrassi: The Next Generation or Degrassi: Next Class, having retired in 1998.

== Career ==
Christopher "Kit" Hood was born in London, England in 1943, the son of Robert Hood and Eve Jennings, a writer of children's books. Hood worked as a child actor, then as a film editor with Walt Disney Productions in London. In 1969, he emigrated to Canada. In Toronto, he was a freelance editor of television commercials when he met Linda Schuyler, a grade 8 teacher-turned-filmmaker who was looking for an editor with advanced technical skills.

In 1976, they founded Playing With Time, a company which specialized in educational films and documentaries. Their first film together was Jimmy: Playing With Time, a documentary about a marathon pianist. That was followed by Ida Makes a Movie, a film about an inner-city girl who wanted to make a film about cleaning up her neighbourhood. The concept for more kids-related episodes was accepted by the CBC, additional funding was procured and the result was The Kids of Degrassi Street. By 1986, they had produced 26 episodes of the show.

Playing With Time produced a number of short films and documentaries, but the majority of the company's output was the first three Degrassi series, which included The Kids of Degrassi Street (1979–86), Degrassi Junior High (1987-89), and Degrassi High (1989-91). The series followed the lives of Toronto children, from elementary school to high school. The shows’ content focused on challenges such as teenage pregnancy, drug use, alcoholism, child abuse, bullying, deaths of parents, and peer pressure. Each series aired to considerable critical and commercial success in Canada and elsewhere, and won numerous awards.

Hood wrote and/or directed and/or produced most of the episodes and made a guest appearance in one, playing an angry parent in the 1988 episode "Censored". At the end of the last season of Degrassi High, Hood and Schuyler produced a documentary about the series called Degrassi Talks, and the 1992 TV movie School's Out!. The two split shortly after, with Schuyler founding Epitome Pictures with Stephen Stohn, leaving Hood in sole control of Playing With Time. He began operating instead under Timeless Productions, but as of July 1998, still owned the Playing With Time building and sat on the board of the non-profit PWT Foundation, which had been founded originally to support the cast of Degrassi in their future endeavors. Hood rented the building as a shelter for abused women and children, families experiencing housing crises, and refugees.

Hood did not participate in Degrassi: The Next Generation; he produced and directed a few more projects before retiring to Nova Scotia in 1998. His final public appearance was Degrassi Palooza, a reunion of the Degrassi Junior High and Degrassi High cast, which took place in Toronto in June 2019; actress Stacie Mistysyn later remarked: "I think he felt that people didn’t necessarily associate him with the legacy of ‘Degrassi’ anymore, because he sold the rights to Linda Schuyler, so I think it was really good for him to have fans tell him how much they appreciated him being a part of it since he founded the original show".

== Personal life and death ==
Hood was married to Agnes Malouf, a teacher, and had two daughters and one step-daughter. On January 20, 2020, he died of a brain aneurysm in his home in West Lawrencetown, Nova Scotia, at age 76. In a statement, Linda Schuyler said of Hood's "trademark impish charm", his "kid’s-eye view, never letting the camera look down on our young protagonists", and his "intimate and respectful style of directing, small of scale and richly layered", and remarked that "to this day, his style is deeply imbedded in Degrassi’s DNA". Actor Pat Mastroianni, who played Joey Jeremiah, praised him as "fundamental in laying the foundation of the Degrassi franchise".

In August 2021, Hood's daughter Georgia created an online petition to have the City of Toronto name a laneway, located in the Leslieville neighbourhood behind the former Playing With Time production office, after him. In September 2023, actor Pat Mastroianni announced on his Facebook page, Degrassi Tour, that the campaign was successful, with the laneway renamed to "Kit Hood Lane".

== Filmography ==
Director and/or Producer and/or Writer

- Our Cultural Fabric - short film, 1978
- Jimmy: Playing With Time - documentary, 1979
- Ida Makes a Movie - short film, 1979
- The Kids of Degrassi Street - TV series, 26 episodes, 1979-1986
- Growing Up with Sandy Offenheim - documentary, 1980
- Pearls in the Alphabet Soup - short film, 1980
- Don’t Call Me Stupid - short film, 1980
- Advice on Lice - short film, 1985
- OWL/TV - TV series, Real Kids segments, 1985-1986
- Danger Keep Out! - documentary short, 1987
- The Kids of Degrassi Street - TV series, 59 episodes, 1987-1991
- Degrassi Junior High - TV series, 1987-1989 (co-creator)
- Degrassi High - TV series, 1989-1991 (co-creator)
- Degrassi Talks - documentary series, 6 episodes, 1992
- School's Out! - TV movie, 1992
- X-Rated - TV movie, 1994
- Road to Avonlea - TV series, director, 1 episode (A Fox Tale), 1995
- Strauss: The King of 3/4 Time - TV movie, 1995
- Just a Little Red Dot - short film, 1997
- Dancing on the Moon - drama, 1997
