= Yan Moore =

Canadian screenwriter

Yan Moore (born February 6, 1953) is a Canadian television writer and producer. He is best known as a writer for Degrassi Junior High, Degrassi High and Degrassi: The Next Generation. He was also the creator and producer of the Canadian soap opera Riverdale (1997–2000). He was nominated for a Gemini Award in 1995 for Best Writing in a Dramatic Series for his work on Road to Avonlea.
