= Grassy =

Grassy (meaning 'covered with grass' or 'resembling grass') may refer to:

== Populated places ==
- Grassy, Lauderdale County, Alabama, an unincorporated community
- Grassy, Marshall County, Alabama, an unincorporated community
- Grassy, Missouri, unincorporated community in western Bollinger County, Missouri, United States
- Grassy, Tasmania, small town on King Island in the Australian state of Tasmania

== Geographical features ==
- Grassy Cove, enclosed valley in Cumberland County, Tennessee, in the southeastern United States
- Grassy Hill, the tenth highest hill in Hong Kong
- Grassy Island, small, uninhabited 72-acre (29 ha) American island in the Detroit River
- Grassy Key, island in the middle Florida Keys
- Grassy Lake Dam, small dam operated by the U.S. Bureau of Reclamation in Teton County, Wyoming
- Grassy Range, mountain range in Jackson County, Oregon
- Grassy Ridge, ridge in the Blue Ridge Mountains in the U.S. state of Georgia

== Other uses ==
- Grassy (wine), a wine taste descriptor
- Grassy, a character from the fourth season of Battle for Dream Island, an animated web series

== See also ==
- Grassi
- De Grassi (disambiguation)
- Di Grassi
