= List of notable streets in Toronto =

The following is a list of notable non-arterial streets in Toronto, Ontario, Canada.

== Bremner Boulevard ==
Bremner Boulevard / Raptors Way
- Length: 1.2 kilometres (0.75 mi)
- Location: Spadina Avenue - Lake Shore Boulevard West

Bremner Boulevard is a short street in downtown Toronto, Ontario, Canada. The street is notable for having several landmarks are located on the street, including the Rogers Centre, the CN Tower, the Toronto Railway Museum, Ripley's Aquarium of Canada, the Delta Toronto Hotel, Maple Leaf Square, and the west entrance to Scotiabank Arena. Following the Toronto Raptors victory in the 2019 NBA Finals, the section of Bremner Boulevard from York Street to Lake Shore Boulevard West was renamed Raptors Way.

== Bond Street ==
Bond Street
- Length: 0.6 kilometres (0.37 mi)
- Location: Gould Street - Queen Street East

Bond Street is a short street from Gould Street to Queen Street East, it is home to many historic buildings and associations with many historical figures of the city.

== Colborne Street ==
Colborne Street
- Length: 0.3 kilometres (0.19 mi)
- Location: Yonge Street - Church Street

Colborne Street is a street running several hundred metres east of Yonge Street in downtown Toronto, Ontario, Canada. It crosses Victoria Street and Leader Lane, ending at Church Street. It is located between and parallel to King Street East and Wellington Street East. The street is notable for retaining several historic buildings built during the reign of Queen Victoria.

== De Grassi Street ==
De Grassi Street
- Length: 0.8 kilometres (0.50 mi)
- Location: Queen Street East - Gerrard Street East

De Grassi Street is a side street located in Toronto, Ontario, Canada. It was named after Captain Filippo "Philip" De Grassi, an Italian-born soldier who immigrated to Canada with his family in 1831 and settled in York, Upper Canada. It is best known in popular culture as the namesake of the teen drama television franchise Degrassi, with the first three series shot in and around the street.

== Draper Street ==
Draper Street
- Length: 0.2 kilometres (0.12 mi)
- Location: Front Street West - Wellington Street West

Draper Street is a street in downtown Toronto, Ontario, Canada. It is a north–south street located to the west of Spadina Avenue, from Front Street West north to Wellington Street. Draper Street is notable for its collection of twenty-eight 19th Century Second Empire-styled row cottages. The houses were designated by the City of Toronto in the 1990s to have heritage status. The entire street is designated as a Heritage Conservation District as a way to preserve its heritage for posterity.

The street is named after William Henry Draper, a lawyer, judge, and politician in Upper Canada later Canada West. The street was laid out in an 1856 plan of subdivision by J. Stoughton Dennis of lands that were part of the 1794 Garrison Reserve. Draper and Charles Jones are listed as the property owners of the lots to be subdivided for development. The street is narrow; it is only 32 feet (9.8 m)-wide. The lots are all 88 feet (27 m) deep and vary in width from 22 feet (6.7 m) to 32 feet (9.8 m) wide.

== The Esplanade ==
The Esplanade
- Length: 1.2 kilometres (0.75 mi)
- Location: Yonge Street - Berkeley Street

The Esplanade is an east–west street along the central waterfront of Toronto, Ontario, Canada.

Originally conceived as a city beautification project to clean up the city's waterfront in the 1850s, the street was taken over by the coming of the railways to Toronto in 1850. The railway eventually moved to an elevated viaduct, leaving only the eastern section of the street today. The area, east of Yonge Street, was dominated by industrial uses until the second half of the 20th Century. As the harbour declined as a transfer point, the railway and industrial uses left the area. The Esplanade was redeveloped into a residential area, known as the "St. Lawrence Neighbourhood" in the late 1970s and early 1980s. This neighbourhood consists of generally low-rise and mid-rise housing - condominiums, public housing, cooperatives and some town homes between Jarvis and Parliament Street south of Front Street. In the blocks between Jarvis and Parliament the southern part of the street (and the former rail tracks) - were converted to a long strip of park and recreation space for the residents - David Crombie Park. The stretch between Scott Street and Market Street is a popular restaurant area.

== George Street ==
George Street
- Length: 1.6 kilometres (0.99 mi)
- Location: Union Station Rail Corridor - Gerrard Street East

George Street is a north–south street in Toronto, Ontario, Canada, from south of Front Street, north to Gerrard Street. Its southern blocks are within the grid of the townsite of the original town of York, Upper Canada. George Street was once one of the most exclusive and expensive addresses in the city. Today, the north end of the street, next to Seaton House men's shelter, is an example of urban blight.

== Graffiti Alley ==
Graffiti Alley
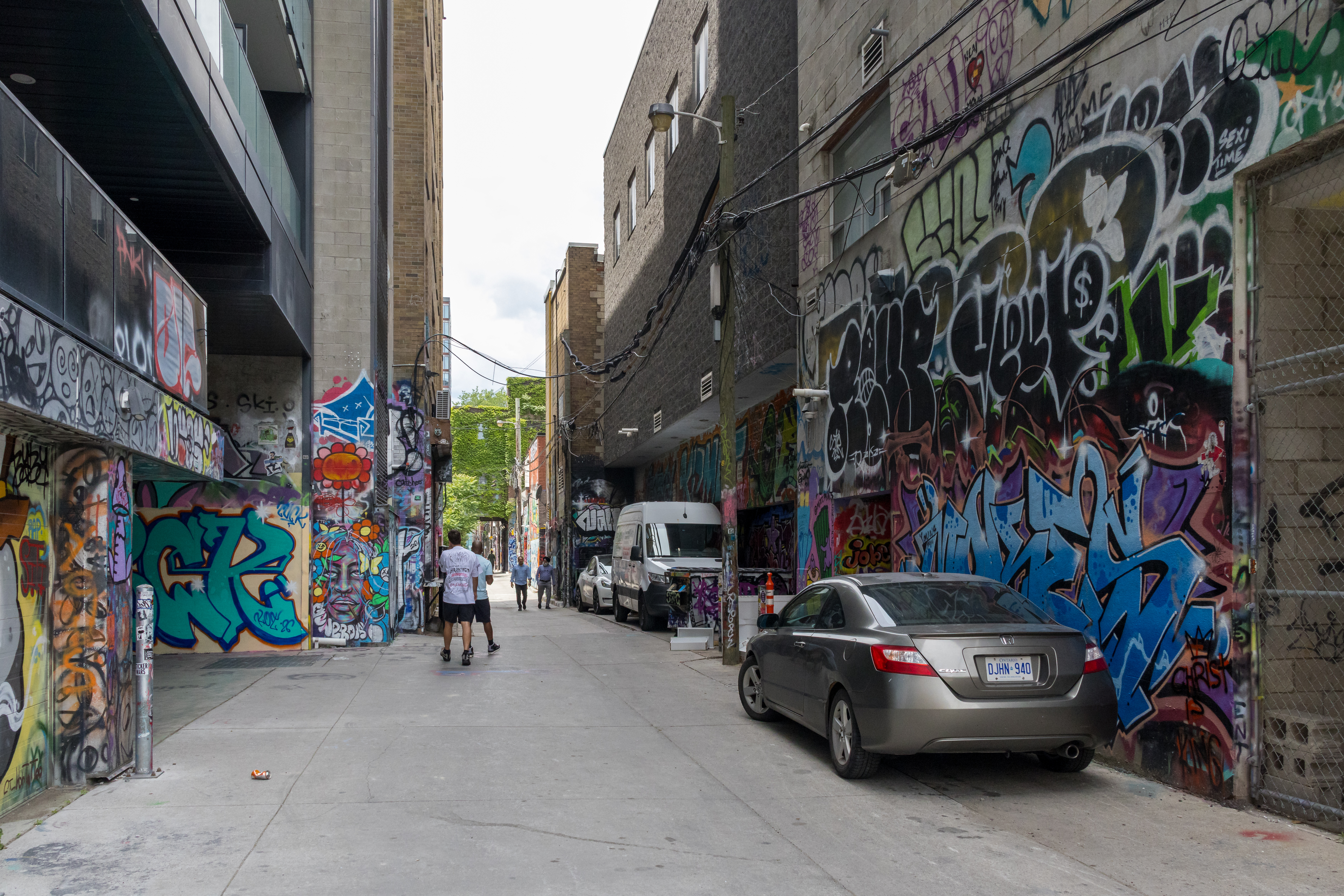
- Part of the alleyway in 2026
- Length: 0.4 kilometres (0.25 mi)
- Location: Portland Street - Spadina Avenue

Graffiti Alley, officially Rush Lane, is a three-block alleyway in Toronto's Fashion District, known for hosting street art. Lonely Planet has called the site "possibly the most popular place to check out street art in Toronto". Despite its popularity with tourists and leniency by law enforcement, it is not a legal wall.

== John Street ==
John Street
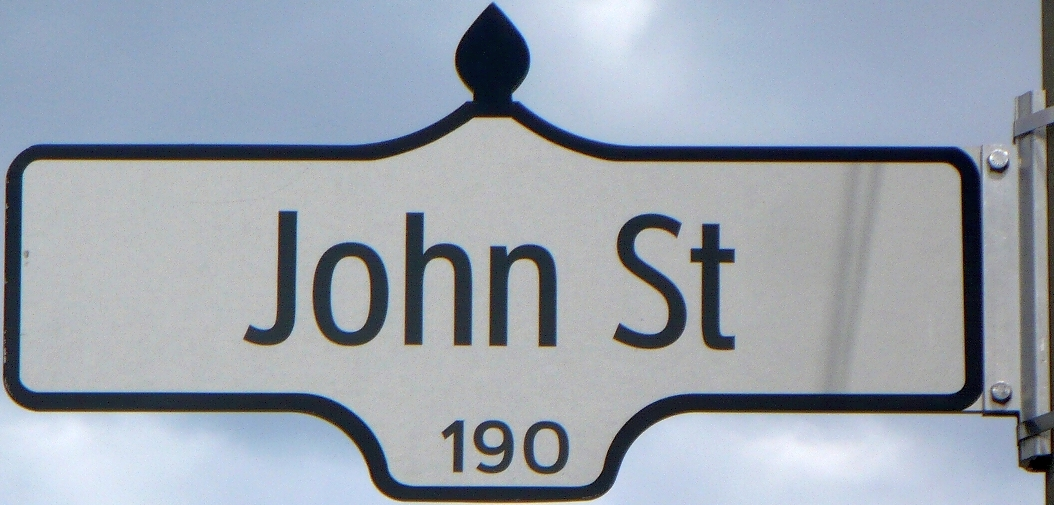
- Length: 0.85 km (0.53 mi)
- Location: Stephanie Street – Front Street

John Street is one of several in the area named after the first Lieutenant Governor of Upper Canada and founder of York, Upper Canada, John Graves Simcoe. The street begins on Front just north of Metro Toronto Convention Centre and north to Stephanie Street. North of Stephanie Street, the street becomes a pedestrian walkway towards Grange Park and the Art Gallery of Ontario. South of Front Street, John Street becomes a pedestrian cable-stayed bridge and walkway between the Rogers Centre and the CN Tower.

== Leader Lane ==
Leader Lane
- Length: 0.15 kilometres (0.093 mi)
- Location: Wellingston Street East - King Street East

Leader Lane is a short street in Toronto, Ontario, Canada. The street was part of the former city of York, Upper Canada. It runs from Wellington Street to King Street, crossing Colborne Street. The street was renamed Leader's Lane after the Toronto Leader, a newspaper whose offices were located there from 1852 to 1878. It was the site of York's first jail and "hanging yard".

== Markham Street ==
Markham Street
- Length: 2.6 kilometres (1.6 mi)
- Location: Queen Street West - Follis Avenue

Markham Street is a north–south residential street located in the city of Toronto, Ontario, Canada, one block west of Bathurst Street. Its northern end starts in the Seaton Village neighbourhood and it passes through Mirvish Village, Palmerston–Little Italy, Trinity–Bellwoods and ends at West Queen Street West at its south end.

== Palmerston Boulevard ==
Palmerston Boulevard
- Length: 3.1 kilometres (1.9 mi)
- Location: Queen Street East - Canadian Pacific railroad tracks

Palmerston Boulevard is a residential street located in the city of Toronto, Ontario, Canada, two blocks west of Bathurst Street, between Koreatown and Little Italy. The street is bounded by stone and iron gates both at Bloor Street and College Street. Notably, it is lit with symmetrically placed cast-iron lamps and canopied by mature silver maple trees.

== Raymore Drive ==
Raymore Drive
- Location: Scarlett Road - Humber River

Raymore Drive is a mostly residential street in the Weston neighbourhood of Toronto in the Canadian province of Ontario. It runs next to the Humber River. On October 15, 1954, the area was severely affected by Hurricane Hazel. When the Humber River burst its banks and tore away a footbridge, the waters of the Humber were redirected through the neighbourhood. The flood killed 35 residents and washed away 39 percent of the street. The washed-away part of Raymore Drive was never rebuilt, as subsequent residential development in that area has been prohibited; it is now part of Raymore Park.

== Rees Street ==
Rees Street
- Length: 0.22 km (0.14 mi)
- Location: Bremner Avenue – Queen's Quay West

Rees Street is named for Dr William Rees (1800–1874), a physician who provided health services to immigrants to the city in the 19th Century, as well as being an advocate for social reform and public services. Rees established at public bath on wharf, which was informally named Rees Wharf at the foot of Peter/John Street (now lies somewhere between Rogers Centre and the CN Tower). After Rees' death, the wharf became the Water Works, a water pumping station.

== Reggae Lane ==
Reggae Lane
- Length: 0.15 kilometres (0.093 mi)
- Location: East from Oakwood Avenue

Reggae Lane is a roadway that runs east from Oakwood Avenue, behind a strip of buildings on the south side of Eglinton Avenue in the Eglinton West ethnic enclave also known as Little Jamaica. For most of its history, it had no official name, but the imminent arrival of Oakwood LRT station of Line 5 Eglinton helped trigger its 2015 official naming by Josh Colle. The neighbourhood near Reggae Lane was recognized as a centre for reggae recording as early as the late 1960s.

== Simcoe Street ==
Simcoe Street
- Length: 1.4 kilometres (0.87 mi)
- Location: Queen Quay West - Just north of Queen Street West

Simcoe Street is a street in Toronto named for first Lieutenant Governor of Upper Canada (now Ontario) John Graves Simcoe. From Queen's Quay to Front Street West, it is called Lower Simcoe Street connecting via the Simcoe Street Tunnel beneath tracks west of Union Station (Toronto). This section was result of infilling of harbour south of Front Street.

From Wellington Street West north to Queen Street West, Simcoe Street is a southbound only for cars with a contraflow bike lane. North of Queen Street, it continues briefly as a pedestrian only street to Michael Sweet Avenue behind Canada Life Building, Ontario Superior Court of Justice and close to US Consulate.

Prior to mid 1850s it was called Graves Street. The section north of Queen Street was previously called William Street until 1870s.

== York Street ==
York Street
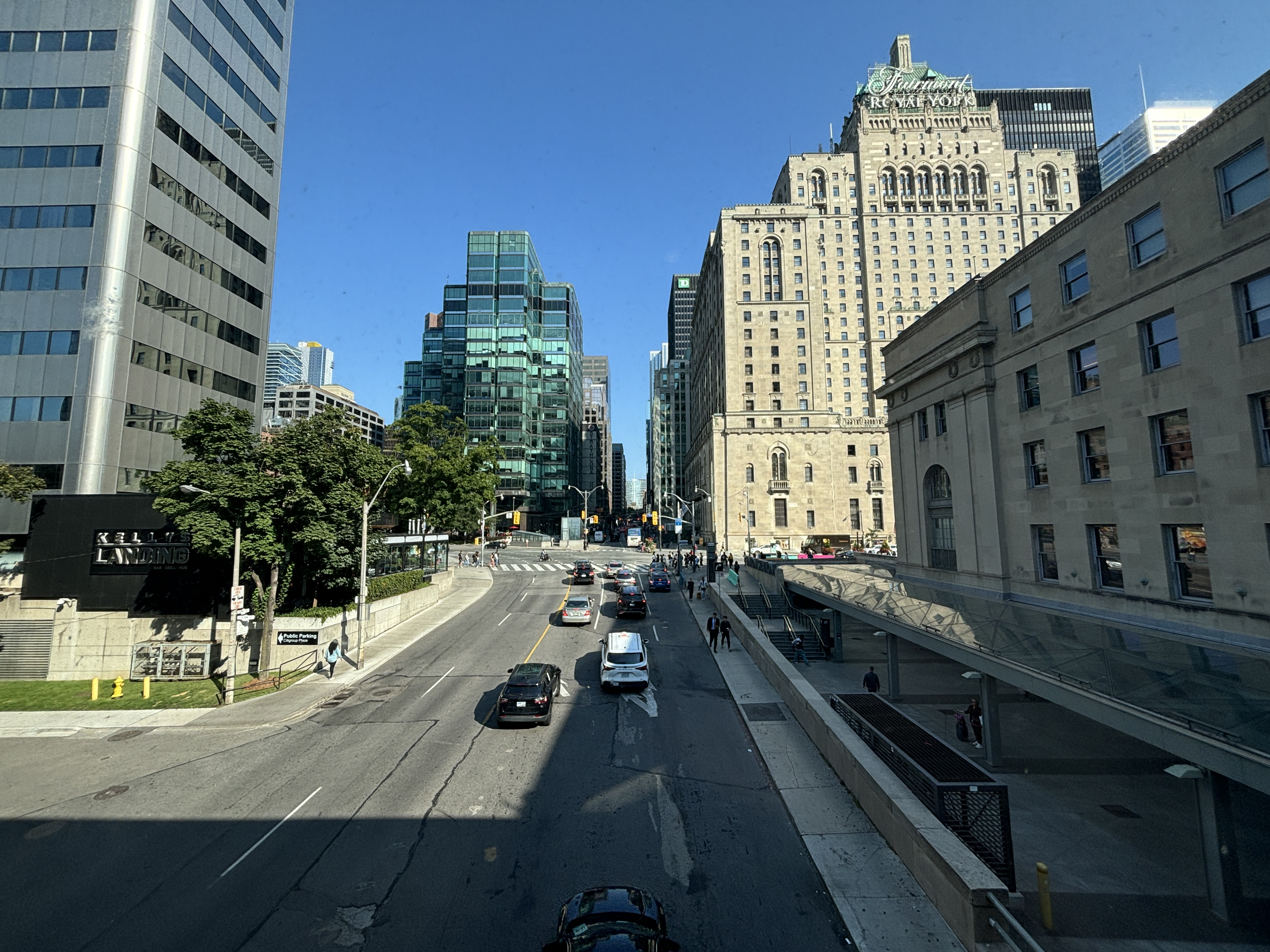
- York Street near Union Station
- Length: 1.3 kilometres (0.81 mi)
- Location: Queens Quay West - Queen Street West

York Street is one of the oldest streets in Toronto. It extends from Toronto Harbour north to Queen Street one block west of Bay Street. At Front Street, University Avenue merges into York Street south of Front. To the east at Front Street is Union Station and the Royal York Hotel. At its northern end is Osgoode Hall and the Sheraton Centre hotel.

In the early years of Toronto, York Street was the 'red-light district' of Toronto. The stretch between King and Queen streets contained ten known brothels, several assignation houses, eight unlicensed bars that served "maddening liquor to the depraved masses", and second-hand dealers who would move stolen goods and hide illegal stashes of whisky. Constables would start investigations of crimes by visiting York Street, expecting criminals to be found there, as in a case in 1883 when two women who stole a drunken farmer's watch were arrested in a York Street bar shortly afterwards. The street was embarrassing to Toronto citizens who worried about "the opinion of strangers who are dumped from the train into one of the most disreputable streets that every existed in any city."

== See also ==
- Lists of roads in Toronto
  - List of north–south roads in Toronto
  - List of east–west roads in Toronto
  - List of contour roads in Toronto
