= De Grasse =

De Grasse may refer to:

== People ==
- Andre De Grasse (born 1994), Canadian sprinter
- François Joseph Paul de Grasse (1722–1788), French admiral and commander at the Siege of Yorktown in the American Revolutionary War
- John van Salee de Grasse (1825–1868), American physician
- Joseph De Grasse (1873–1940), Canadian film director
- Sam De Grasse (1875–1953), Canadian actor
- Neil deGrasse Tyson (born 1958), American astrophysicist
- Isaiah DeGrasse (1813–1841), American clergyman
- Leland DeGrasse (born 1945/1946), American judge

== Ships ==
Named in honour of Admiral De Grasse:

=== French Navy ===
- French cruiser De Grasse
- French frigate De Grasse (D 612)

=== French Merchant Marine ===
- SS De Grasse - French passenger liner built by Cammell, Laid & Company Ltd in Birkenhead, England for the French line Compagnie Générale Transatlantique

=== US Navy ===
- USS De Grasse (AK-223)
- USS Comte de Grasse (DD-974)

== See also ==
- Grasse (disambiguation)
- Degrassi (disambiguation)
- Di Grassi
