= Grassetti =

Grassetti is an Italian surname. Notable people with this name include the following:

- Silvio Grassetti (1936 – 2018), Italian professional Grand Prix motorcycle road racer

== See also ==
- Grassett
- Grassi
