= Grasse (disambiguation) =

Grasse is a commune in France.

Grasse may also refer to:

- Arrondissement of Grasse, an arrondissement of France, located in the Alpes-Maritimes departement
- Grasse River, a river in northern New York
- Adrian Grasse, German politician
- Nicolle Grasse, American politician
- Pierre-Paul Grassé, French zoologist

== See also ==
- De Grasse (disambiguation)
- Grassi
