= Lists of roads in Toronto =

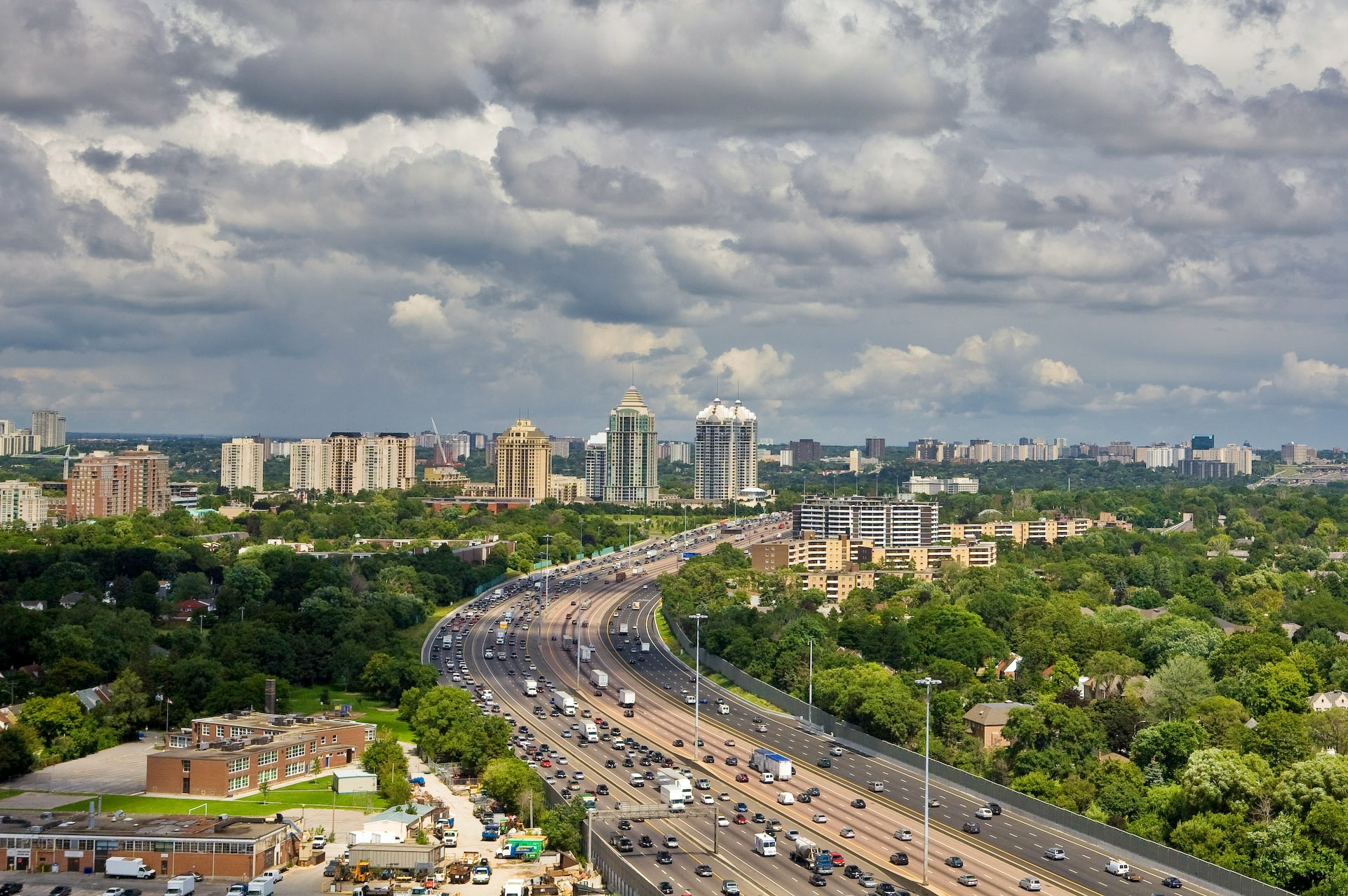
Highway 401, the busiest highway in North America, in Toronto

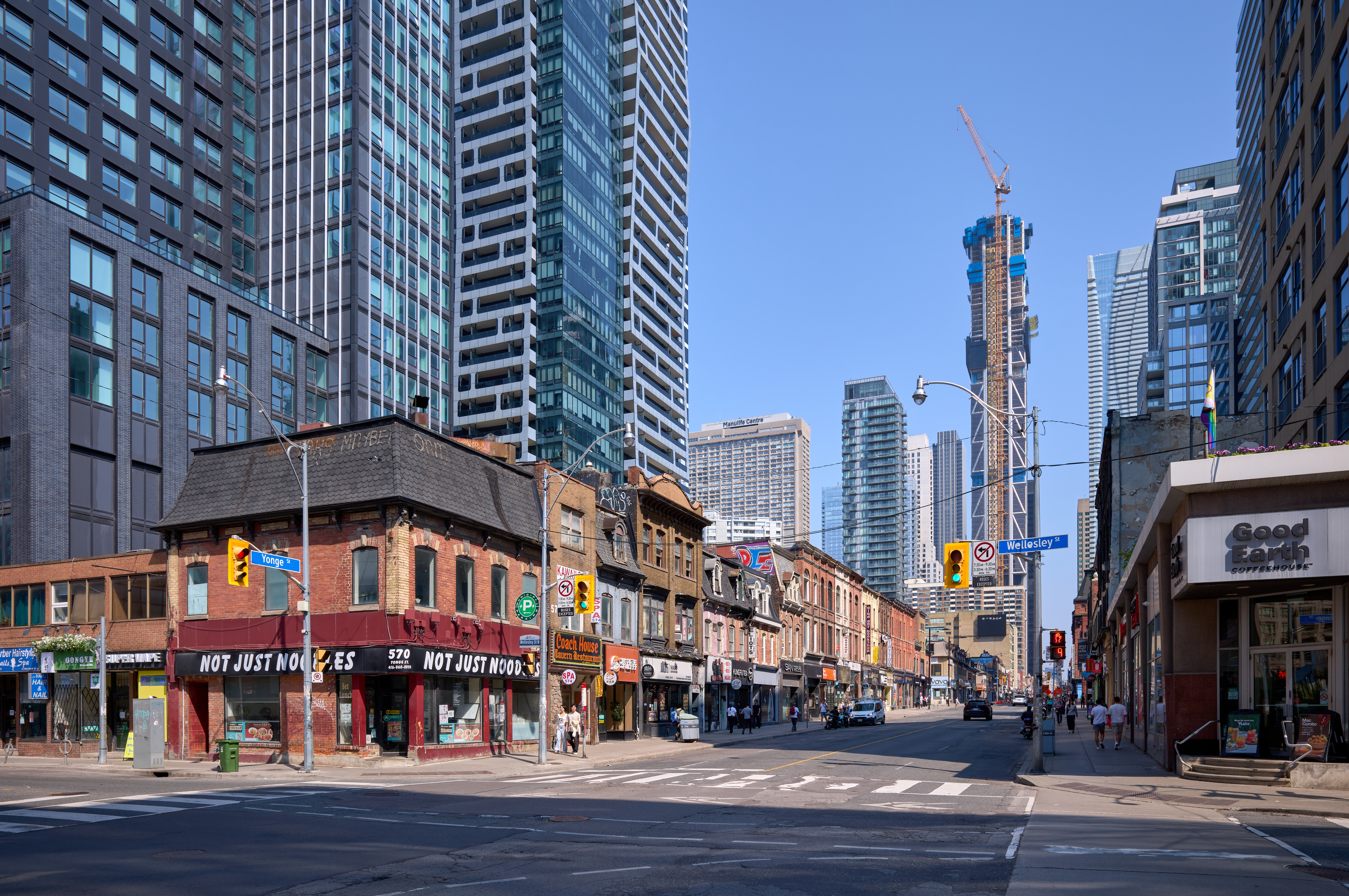
Yonge Street, a central north–south arterial in Toronto

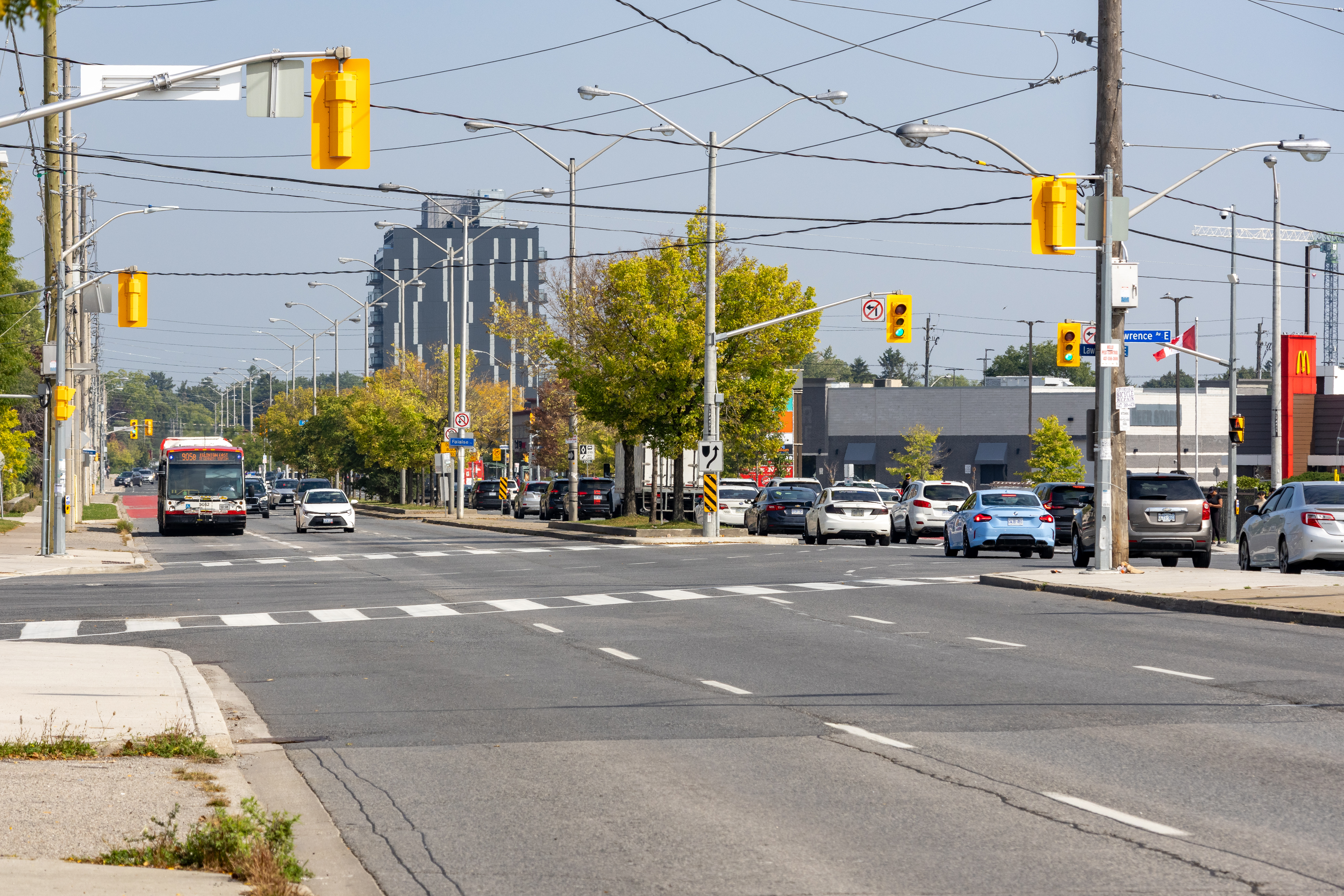
Kingston Road, an arterial that parallels Lake Ontario's shore rather than the grid

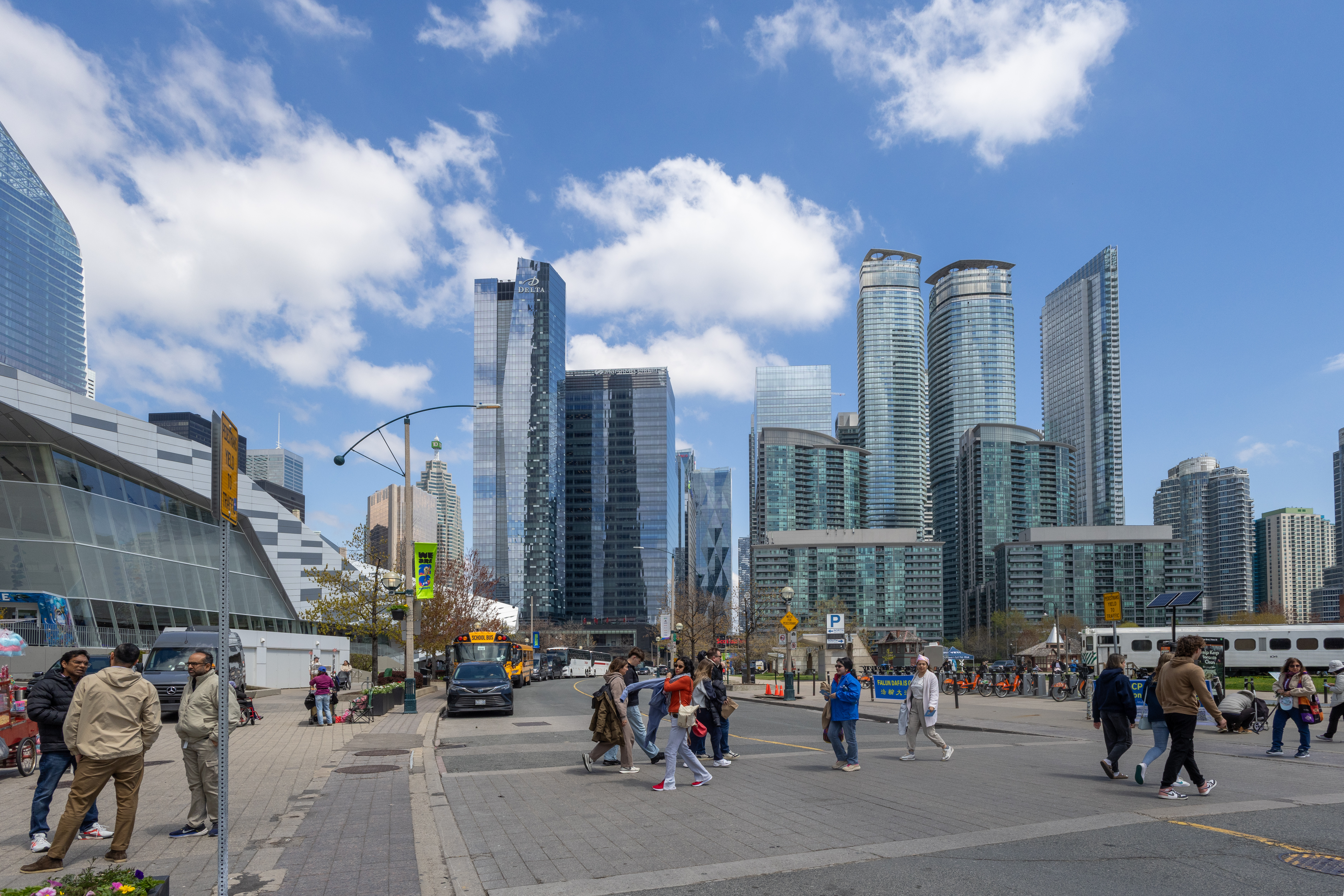
Bremner Boulevard with the Ripley's Aquarium of Canada and Roundhouse Park

Roads in Toronto are largely built along a grid-based road system laid out by a historical concession road system, in which major arterial roads are 100 chains (2.0 km; 6,600 ft) apart (with some exceptions, particularly in Scarborough and Etobicoke, as they used a different survey). Major east–west arterial roads are generally parallel with the Lake Ontario shoreline and major north–south arterial roads are roughly perpendicular to these streets. Toronto's grid north is approximately 17° to the west of true north. The list of roads in Toronto is divided into north–south arteries and expressways, east–west arteries and expressways, contour arteries and expressways, and other notable streets.

== North–south ==
The main north–south arteries of Toronto, from west to east, are Highway 27, Kipling Avenue, Islington Avenue, Weston Road, Jane Street, Keele Street, Dufferin Street, Bathurst Street, Avenue Road / University Avenue, Yonge Street, Bayview Avenue, Leslie Street, Don Mills Road, Victoria Park Avenue, Warden Avenue, Kennedy Road, McCowan Road, Markham Road, and Morningside Avenue.

== East–west ==
The main east–west arteries of Toronto, from south to north, are Lake Shore Boulevard, the Queensway / Queen Street, Bloor Street / Danforth Avenue, St. Clair Avenue, Eglinton Avenue, Lawrence Avenue / Dixon Road, Wilson Avenue / York Mills Road / Ellesmere Road (the latter two connected by Parkwoods Village Drive), Sheppard Avenue, Finch Avenue, and Steeles Avenue.

== Contour ==
Toronto has a few arterials that run diagonally or contour to the predominant grid in the city. These include Albion Road, Danforth Road, Kingston Road, and Rexdale Boulevard.

== Notable streets ==
Apart from arterial roads, there are several other notable streets in Toronto. These include Bremner Boulevard, a street with several landmarks such as the Rogers Centre and CN Tower along its route; De Grassi Street, the namesake for the Canadian television franchise Degrassi; and York Street, a historical street within the city's downtown.
