= Degrassi (disambiguation) =

Degrassi is a Canadian teen drama television franchise created by Linda Schuyler and Kit Hood. From 1979 to 2017, there have been five main series.

Degrassi may also refer to:

== Degrassi franchise ==
- The Kids of Degrassi Street, the original television series (1979–1986)
- Degrassi Junior High, the second series in the franchise and the first to feature recurring cast members and storylines (1987–1989)
- Degrassi High, the third series in the franchise and a direct continuation from Degrassi Junior High (1989–1991)
- Degrassi: The Next Generation (later titled Degrassi from season ten), the fourth series in the franchise and revival of the previous series with a new generation of characters (2001–2015)
- Degrassi: Next Class, the fifth series in the franchise, a direct continuation from Degrassi: The Next Generation (2016–2017)
- Degrassi (unproduced TV series)

== Music ==
- Degrassi (band), a Scottish indie rock band
- "Degrassi", a song by American pop rock band Lemon Demon

== People ==
- Alex De Grassi (born 1952), American fingerstyle guitarist, author, composer and performer
- Attilio Degrassi (1887–1969), Italian scholar of Latin epigraphy
- Filippo De Grassi (1793–1877), an Italian-Canadian soldier who became a member of the Family Compact
  - De Grassi Street, a side street located in Toronto, Ontario, Canada and namesake of the television franchise
- Mario De Grassi (disambiguation), several people

== See also ==
- Di Grassi, a surname
- De Grasse
