= Albion Road =

Roads named Albion Road include:

== Britain ==
- Albion Road, a Road in London

== Canada ==
=== Greater Toronto Area ===
- Albion Road (Toronto)
  - Ontario Highway 50

=== Elsewhere ===
- Albion Road (Ottawa)
