= Carlo Grassi =

Italian Roman Catholic bishop and cardinal

Carlo Grassi (1520 – 25 March 1571) was an Italian Roman Catholic bishop and cardinal.

== Biography ==
Carlo Grassi was born in Bologna in 1519, the son of Bolognese patrician Palatine Count Giannantonio Grassi and his wife Diana Grati. He was the grand-nephew of Cardinal Achille Grassi.

He was educated at the University of Bologna. He received the subdiaconate before becoming canon and archpriest of Bologna Cathedral in 1550. In 1554, he became a Privy Chamberlain of His Holiness. He became a doctor of both laws in 1557.

On 20 December 1555, he was elected Bishop of Montefiascone e Corneto; he was subsequently consecrated as a bishop. During the sede vacante of 1559, the College of Cardinals appointed him to be governor of Rome, a post he held from 19 August 1559 until 26 March 1560. On 30 March 1560 Pope Pius IV named him governor of Umbria and Perugia, with the title of vice-legate from 5 May 1560 until June 1561. From 18 November 1561 until 1562, he was vice-legate in Camerino. He participated in the Council of Trent from 11 November 1562 until its closing in 1563; he was named a member of the commission to revise the decree of reform on 8 October 1563. On 20 January 1564 he was named governor of Viterbo and the Patrimonium Sancti Petri. He became a cleric in the Apostolic Camera on 24 March 1565. He also served as the praefectus annonae in 1565. From 8 June 1569 until 17 May 1570, he was governor of Rome and Vice-Camerlengo of the Holy Roman Church.

Pope Pius V made him a cardinal priest in the consistory of 17 May 1570. He received the red hat and the titular church of Sant'Agnese in Agone on 9 June 1570. The pope charged him with seeking the support of the Republic of Venice and Spain for war against the Ottoman Empire. He was also charged with some reforms of the Roman Curia.

He died on 25 March 1571. He was buried in Trinità dei Monti.
