= Grassi =

Grassi is an Italian surname. Notable people with the surname include:

- Achille Grassi, Italian Roman Catholic bishop and cardinal
- Alberto Grassi, Italian footballer
- Alex de Grassi, American guitarist
- Bruno Grassi, Brazilian footballer
- Carlo Grassi, Italian cardinal
- Carlo Grassi, Italian partisan
- Claudio Grassi, Italian tennis player
- Davide Grassi, Italian footballer
- Ernesto Grassi, Italian philosopher
- Flavio Grassi (born 1968), Italian sailor
- Franz Dominic Grassi, German merchant with Italian descent
- Giacomo di Grassi, Italian fencing master
- Giorgio Grassi, Italian architect
- Giovanni Antonio Grassi, Jesuit priest and President of Georgetown University
- Giovanni Battista Grassi, Italian physician and zoologist
- Giuseppe Grassi, Italian politician, member of the Italian Liberal Party
- Giuseppe Grassi, Italian cyclist
- Giuseppina Grassi, Mexican professional road cyclist
- Gregorio Grassi, Italian Franciscan friar and bishop
- Josef Grassi, Austrian portrait and history painter
- Julio César Grassi, Argentine priest
- Libero Grassi, Italian clothing manufacturer, killed by the Mafia
- Lucas di Grassi, Brazilian race-car driver
- Luigi Grassi, Italian footballer
- Marco Grassi, Swiss footballer
- Mitch Grassi, Member of the a cappella group Pentatonix
- Nicolò Grassi, also known as Nicola Grassi, Italian painter, active in a late-Baroque or Rococo style
- Orazio Grassi, Italian Jesuit astronomer and mathematician
- Paolo Grassi, Italian theatrical impresario
- Raymond Grassi, Canadian former ice sledge hockey player
- Santiago Grassi, Argentine swimmer
- Tullio Grassi, Swiss footballer

== See also ==
- De Grassi (disambiguation)
- De Grassi Street, a street in Toronto, Ontario, Canada
- Di Grassi
- Grassi Museum, a building complex in Leipzig, Germany, home to three museums: the Ethnography Museum, Musical Instruments Museum, and Applied Arts Museum
- Mount Lawrence Grassi, a mountain located immediately south of the town of Canmore, in Alberta's Canadian Rockies
- Palazzo Grassi, the former estate of the Grassi family located on the Grand Canal (Venice)
