= Degrassi (band) =

Scottish indie rock band

- Origin: Edinburgh, Scotland
- Genres: Indie rock
- Years active: 1999–present
- Members: Scott Smith; Michael Branagh; Bob Fairfoull; Owen Innes; Ali Chisholm
- Past members: Stephen McColl; Chris Bathgate; Stuart Turner; Tom Nicol; Paul Phillips; Mike Baillie

Degrassi is a Scottish indie rock band, based in Edinburgh. The band formed in late 1999, with the initial line-up consisting of Scott Smith (guitar) and Michael Branagh (drums/vocals) with Stephen McColl and Stuart Turner on guitar and bass.

They recorded a session in 2001 which was aired on BBC Radio 1's Evening Session, and were subsequently invited to perform a Peel session at Maida Vale. By this point, McColl had left the band as work commitments forced a move to New York and then London, however he played on two of the four tracks recorded at Maida Vale. Bass guitar on the remaining tracks was played by Chris Bathgate, formerly touring guitarist for Ganger, and latterly live bassist for Arab Strap and now frontman for Edinburgh outfit Sans Trauma. Soon after this Peel Session, Chris Bathgate took on guitar and additional vocal duties and Tom Nicol was recruited on bass to help the duo of Branagh and Smith. Shortly thereafter, Bathgate departed and the band welcomed Bob Fairfoull, formerly of Idlewild on bass guitar.

The line up of Michael Branagh and Scott Smith with Tom Nicol and Chris Bathgate released the 'Terminal Ocean' E.P. on SL Records in 2002 and were thereafter for a brief period accompanied by Paul "The Fingers" Phillips (Sans Trauma) incorporating keyboards into the following tours and live shows.

The line up of Scott Smith (guitar/vocals), Michael Branagh (drums/vocals) and Bob Fairfoull (bass) with Tom Nicol (guitar/vocals) recorded an E.P for SL Records 2003's 'The Form' and the 'Tell Charles I'm on my way' 3 track single on the Adorno Records label in 2005.

Signing to SL Records, they played a second Peel Session for the BBC at Maida Vale as part of an SL Records showcase. Degrassi have also appeared at T in the Park three times and played with bands such as Seafood, The 80s Matchbox B-line Disaster, Colour of Fire, The Coral, Faust and Wayne Kramer of MC5 fame.

The band took a break in 2005 to pursue other ventures and the classic line up of Bob Fairfoull, Michael Branagh and Scott Smith re-formed in May 2006.

Their initial recordings were supported by funding from the Scottish Arts Council, and were produced by Michael Brennan, who previously worked with Super Furry Animals and Mogwai.

== Discography ==
=== Singles and EPs ===
- Terminal Ocean (2002)
- The Form (2003)
- Tell Charles I'm on My Way (2004)
