= Carlo Grassi (partisan) =

Italian worker and partisan (1911–1945)

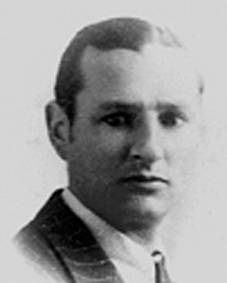
Carlo Grassi

Carlo Grassi (Treviso, 23 March 1911 – Turin, 26 April 1945) was an Italian worker and partisan.

== Biography ==
Originally from a family of immigrants from the Veneto, Grassi was a craftsman in the industrial Turin during Fascism, a city in which he later became a member of a SAP (Patriotic Action Squads). The SAP were intended to defend railways and factories from the programmatic and devastating fury of the German army in retreat, aiming thus at ensuring the country a more rapid recovery once the conflict was over. On 25 April 1945, at 4:30 p.m. Grassi was seriously injured in a fight with German troops at the checkpoint of Via Lanzo in Turin and died the following day. He was initially employed at Bergougnan, subsequently at Superga and then at Pirelli. His colleagues unveiled a memorial plaque in his honour, which is now preserved in the school that bears his name since 1978.

The state-run Industrial Technical Institute "Carlo Grassi" is located next to Piazza Stampalia in Turin, at the site where a large plaque with the names of 57 victims of Madonna di Campagna is placed on the building of the former Customs Duty Office.

== Sources ==
- Piero Calamandrei, «Pietà l'è morta», in Uomini e città della Resistenza, Bari, Laterza, 2006, pp. 126–132
