= Grassy Range =

Mountain range in Jackson County, Oregon

- Location within Oregon

Highest point
- Elevation: 1,572 m (5,157 ft)

Geography
- Country: United States
- State: Oregon
- District: Jackson County
- Range coordinates: 42°53′19.444″N 122°41′4.159″W
- Topo map: USGS Butler Butte

The Grassy Range is a mountain range in Jackson County, Oregon.
