= List of contour roads in Toronto =

The following lists roads in Toronto, Ontario, Canada, that do not follow the city grid, often referred to as contour roads or diagonal roads. They are listed by type of road, then alphabetically.

== Expressways ==
=== Highway 2A ===
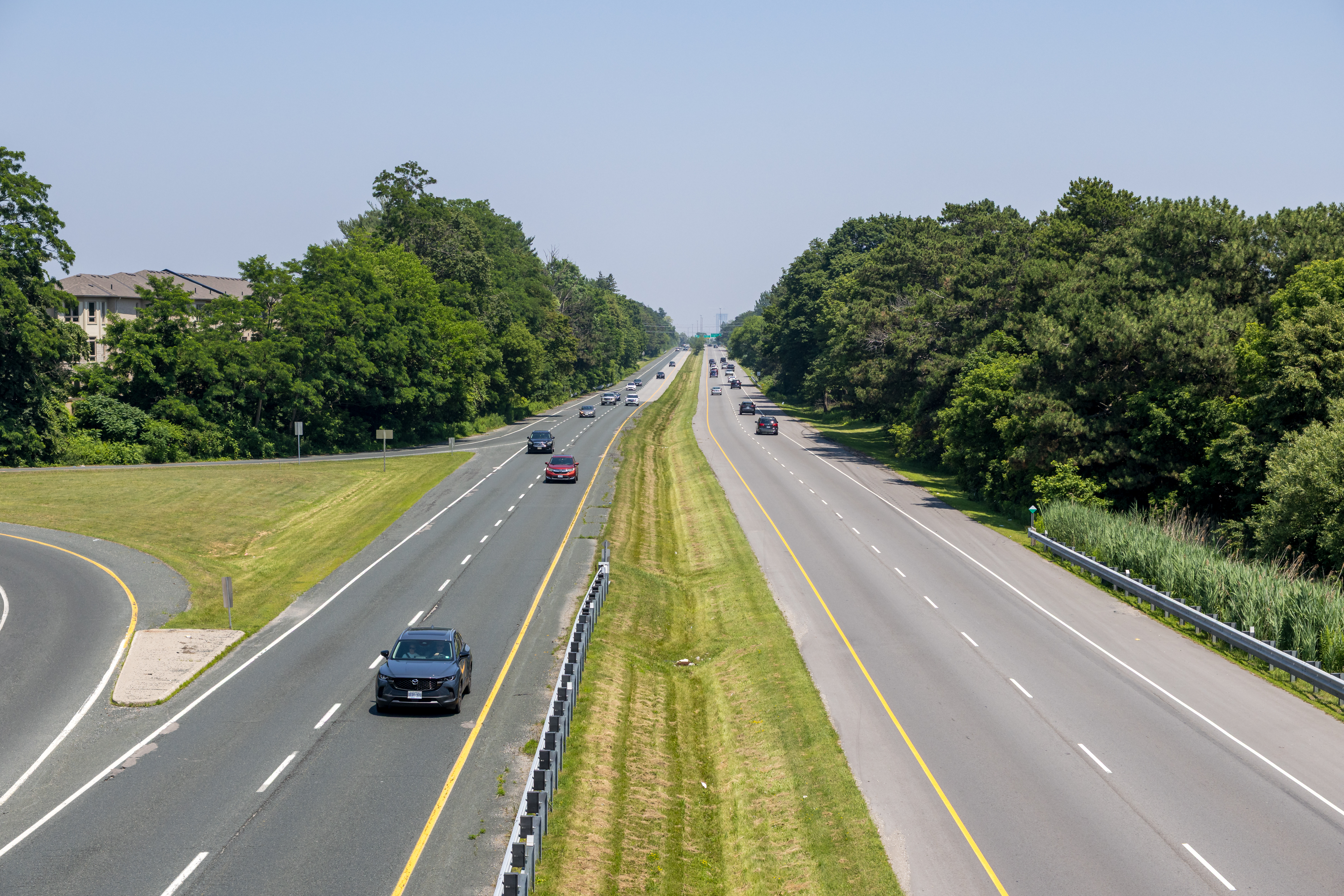
Aside from a resurfaced pavement and guardrails, Highway 2A has not been altered since it opened in 1947.

Highway 2A
- Location: Kingston Road – Highway 401

Highway 2A is a municipal expressway in Toronto that runs between Kingston Road just east of Highland Creek and Ontario Highway 401.

The expressway was previously part of larger provincially maintained bypass to Ontario Highway 2 that first began construction in 1935. The bypass was one of the first dual carriageways in Ontario and was built to relieve congestion along Highway 2. In 1952, all of Highway 2A was redesignated as Ontario Highway 401 apart from the present day Highway 2A. Despite being a spur route, the highway was retained in the provincial inventory until April 1, 1997, when it was transferred to the City of Toronto as part of a provincial downloading of highways to municipalities. Despite falling under municipal control, the highway continues to be named Highway 2A.

== Arterial roads ==
=== Albion Road ===
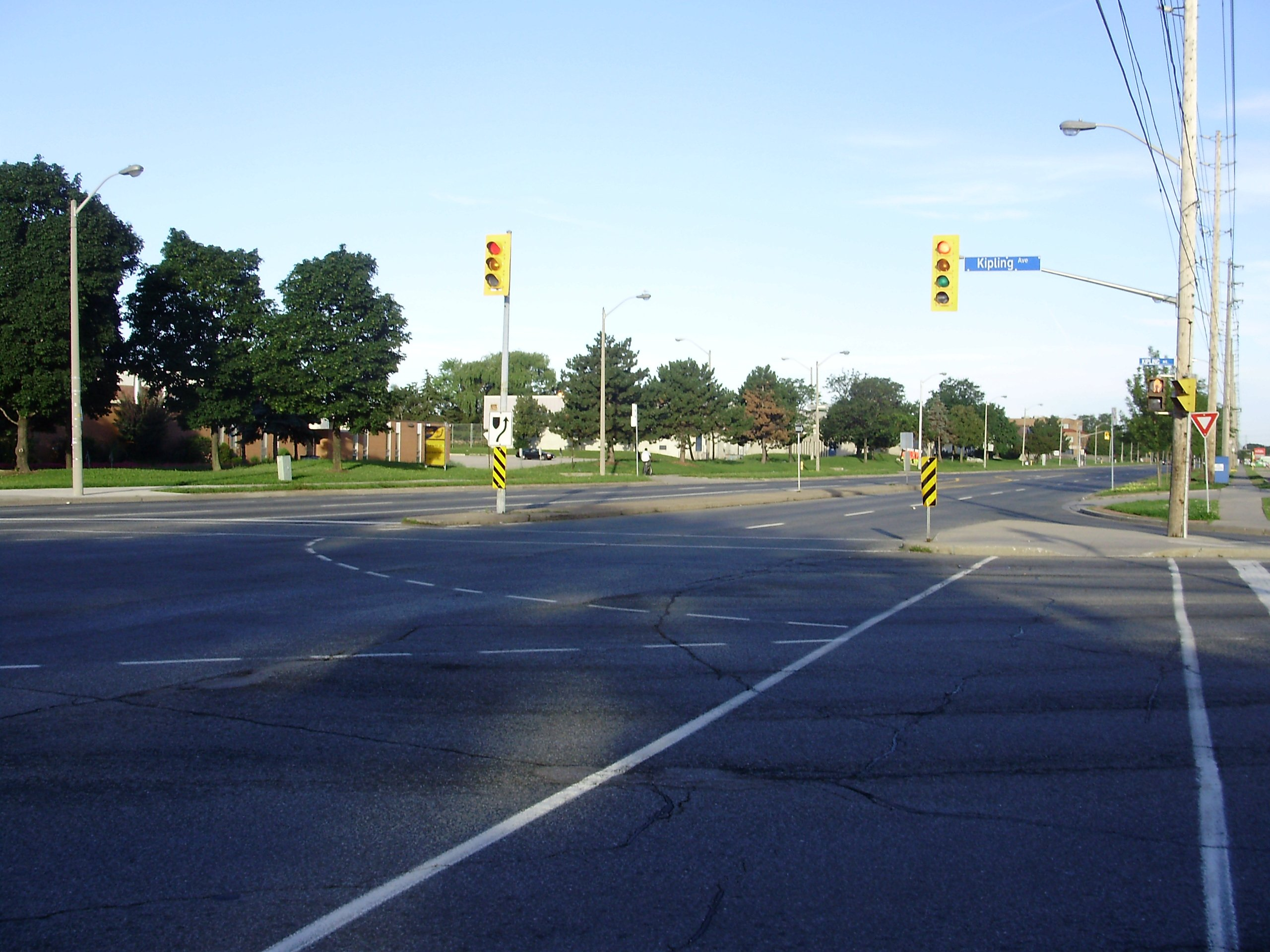
Intersection of Albion Road and Kipling Avenue in 2008

Albion Road
- Length: 9.5 km (5.9 mi)
- Location: Weston Road and Walsh Road–Steeles Avenue (Continues north into Vaughan/Brampton as Highway 50) (Continues east as Walsh/Wilson Avenues)

Albion Road was created as a private road for French teacher Jean du Petit Pont de la Haye (1799–1872) to his estate in the area (the plank road was built in 1846 by Weston Plank Road Company from Musson's Bridge over Humber River to Bolton). Originally called Claireville, it was renamed for the Albion Township, which was the eastern third of the present-day (since 1973/1974) limits of Caledon. The road is located within Toronto, starting at the intersection of Weston Road and Walsh Avenue (continues eastward as Wilson Avenue) and heads northwest to Albion Road and Steeles Avenue (becoming Regional Road 50).

The beginning of the road is Walsh Avenue, a short connector between Albion Road and Wilson Avenue. The intersection at Weston Road and Walsh Avenue is a ramp with two traffic lights for Albion Road/Walsh Avenue and none for Weston Road.

Albion Road northwest of Highway 27 was formerly Highway 50, but later became Peel Regional Road 50, York Regional Road 24 and Simcoe County Road 50 due to downloading from the province. The northern end of Highway 50 is Ontario Highway 89 by the town of New Tecumseth in Simcoe County.

Albion Road is served by TTC route 73C and the southern section is served by route 118. Until 1990, the section was serviced by the 36 Finch West and 118 Finch via Allen Road, the latter of which was cancelled in 1996 due to low ridership and the opening of Sheppard West station (then named Downsview station), making the route redundant. Albion Road is served by Albion stop on Line 6 Finch West.

=== Danforth Road ===
Danforth Road
- Location: Danforth Avenue — McCowan Road

Danforth Road is an arterial street in Toronto. Danforth Road splits off Danforth Avenue west of Warden Avenue and runs diagonally northeast until south of Lawrence Avenue, where it continues as McCowan Road. McCowan Road itself ends at Baseline Road located in Georgina, which is the northernmost municipality in York Region.

The route is served by TTC route 113 Danforth from Danforth Avenue to Kennedy Road and the 16 McCowan from Eglinton Avenue to Lawrence Avenue, just before it becomes McCowan Road.

=== Kingston Road ===
Kingston Road
- Location: Queen Street East – Rouge River

Kingston Road is the southernmost major road along the eastern portion of Toronto, specifically in the district of Scarborough. Until 1997, it formed a portion of Highway 2. The name of the street is derived from Kingston, Ontario, as the road was the primary route used to travel from Toronto to the settlements east of it situated along the northern shores of Lake Ontario; in the west end of Kingston, this highway was referred to as the York Road (referring to the original name of Toronto between 1793 and 1834) until at least 1908. Due to its diagonal course near the shore of Lake Ontario, the street is the terminus of many arterial roads in eastern Toronto, both east–west and north–south, with a few continuing for a short distance after as minor residential streets. However, Lawrence and Morningside Avenues continue as arterials for considerable distances beyond it to the mouth of the Rouge River in West Rouge and Guildwood Parkway, respectively.

Kingston Road is served by Toronto Transit Commission routes 503, 12, 102/902, 86/986 and 905.

=== Rexdale Boulevard ===
Rexdale Boulevard
- Location: Islington Avenue – Highway 427

Rexdale Boulevard is a short east–west roadway in Rexdale, a neighbourhood in Toronto, and begins as a spur road off Islington Avenue just north of Highway 401. This spur originally began in the former village of Weston as a road northwest to what would later become Brampton, Ontario. The current road passes through a mostly light industrial stretch of north Etobicoke.

The street is served by TTC bus route 37A, a branch of 37 Islington.

==== Derry Road ====
West of Highway 427, Rexdale Boulevard becomes Derry Road and enters the city of Mississauga. Derry Road is also signed as Peel Regional Road 5, an east–west route that travels the entire length of the city of Mississauga and Peel Region as a whole. Derry Road is the northern boundary of Toronto Pearson International Airport. The intersection of Derry Road and Airport Road was once the site of Malton, itself a part of Mississauga. West of the intersection with Mavis Road, the road makes a large arc around the former village of Meadowvale. The bypassed stretch was renamed Old Derry Road and can also be seen in a small stretch of Syntex Crescent. Derry Road is named for the "lost village" of Derry West, which was located around the Hurontario Street and Derry Road intersection. Derry West was named after Derry in Northern Ireland and home of many settlers in the area.

West of Highway 407, Derry Road enters Halton Region as Halton Regional Road 7. This stretch of road is mainly rural except for the section between James Snow Parkway and Tremaine Road in Milton. After passing through another rural stretch, the road ends at Milburough Line in the town of Carlisle in Hamilton (formerly in Flamborough before amalgamating with Hamilton in January 2001).

== Collector roads ==
=== Chaplin Crescent ===
Chaplin Crescent
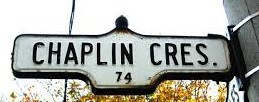
- Length: 2.5 km (1.6 mi)
- Location: Briar Hill Avenue–Yonge Street and Davisville Avenue

Chaplin Crescent is a diagonal street located in Toronto, Ontario. The street runs almost entirely just north and east of the Kay Gardner Beltline Park, a former railway meant to serve the community of Forest Hill (as well as Fairbank and Briar Hill–Belgravia to the west), and primarily runs parallel to it. The street has several parks by it: Castlefield Parkette, Forest Hill Memorial Park, Robert Bateman Parkette, Larratt Parkette, and Oriole Park. At the southeast end of the street where it crosses Yonge Street over Line 1's Davisville station and Davisville Yard, it becomes Davisville Avenue, which continues to Bayview Avenue.

Chaplin Crescent from Roselawn Avenue to Yonge Street is served by TTC route 14 Glencairn. Chaplin station on Line 5 Eglinton opened in February 2026 with the rest of the line's first phase.

Northeast corner of Chaplin Crescent and Eglinton Avenue West from 2015 to 2025 before Line 5 Eglinton's February 2026 opening
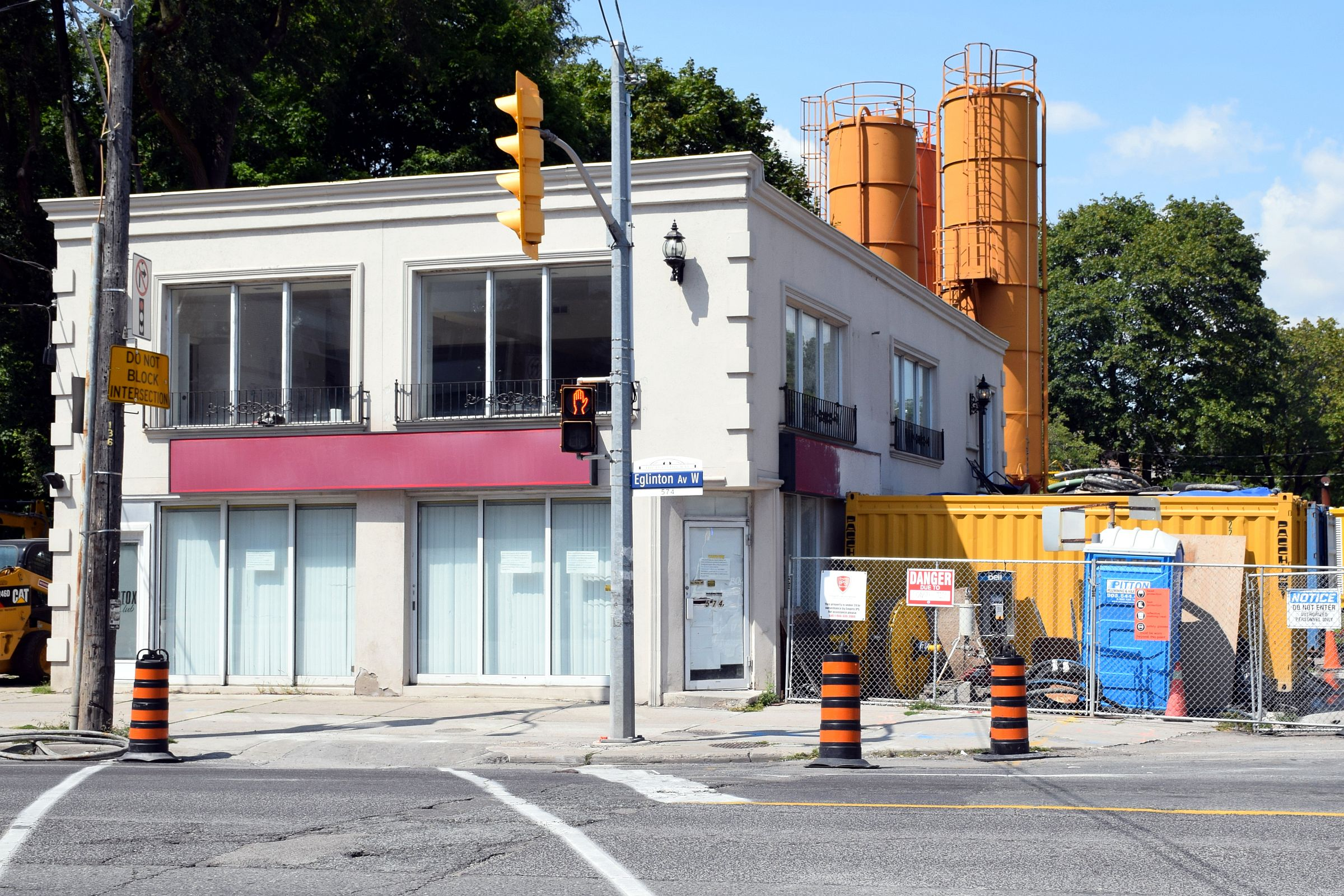
2015: The two-storey mixed-use building formerly housing a Coffee Time coffee shop pre-demolition

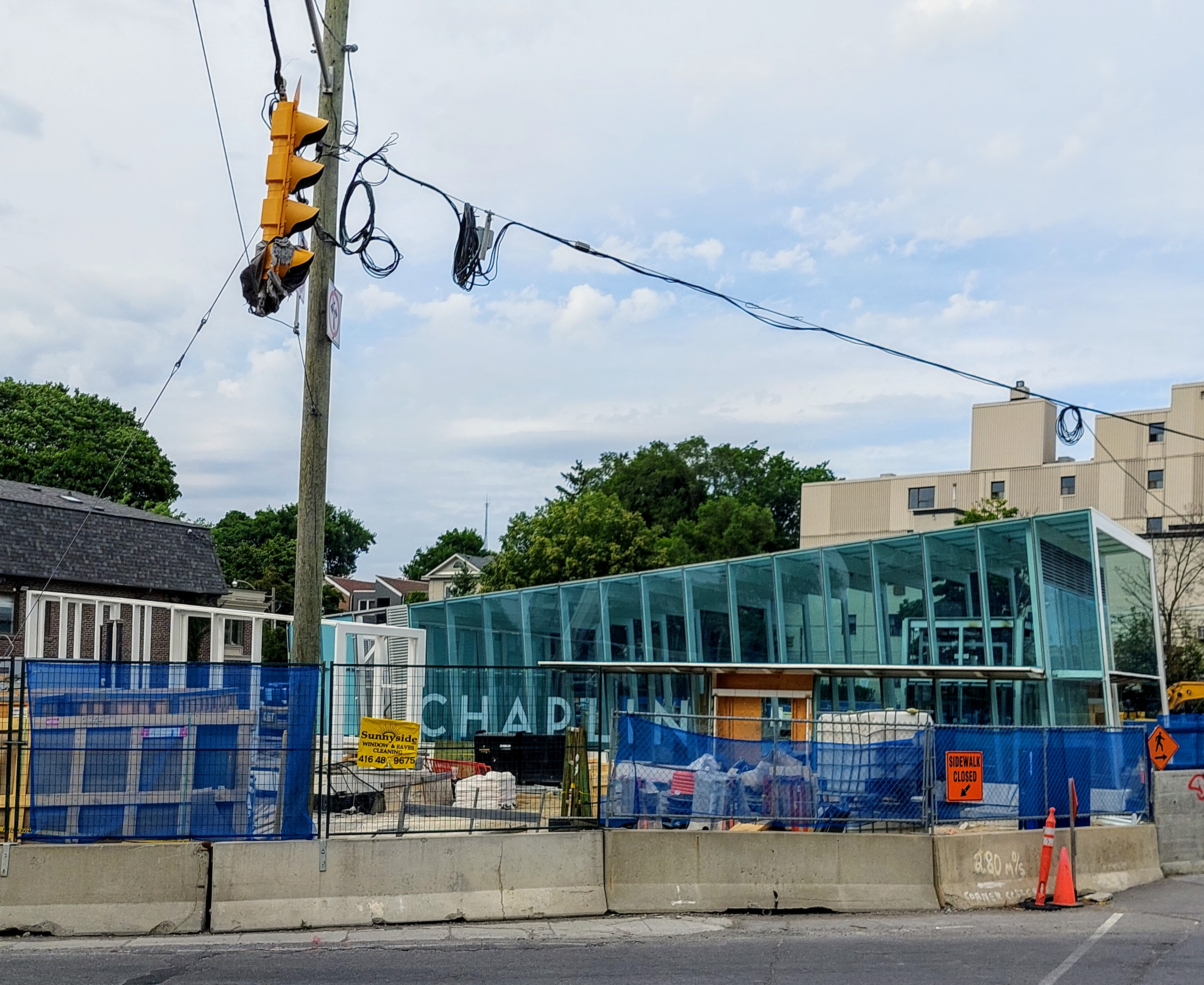
2022: Main entrance of Chaplin station

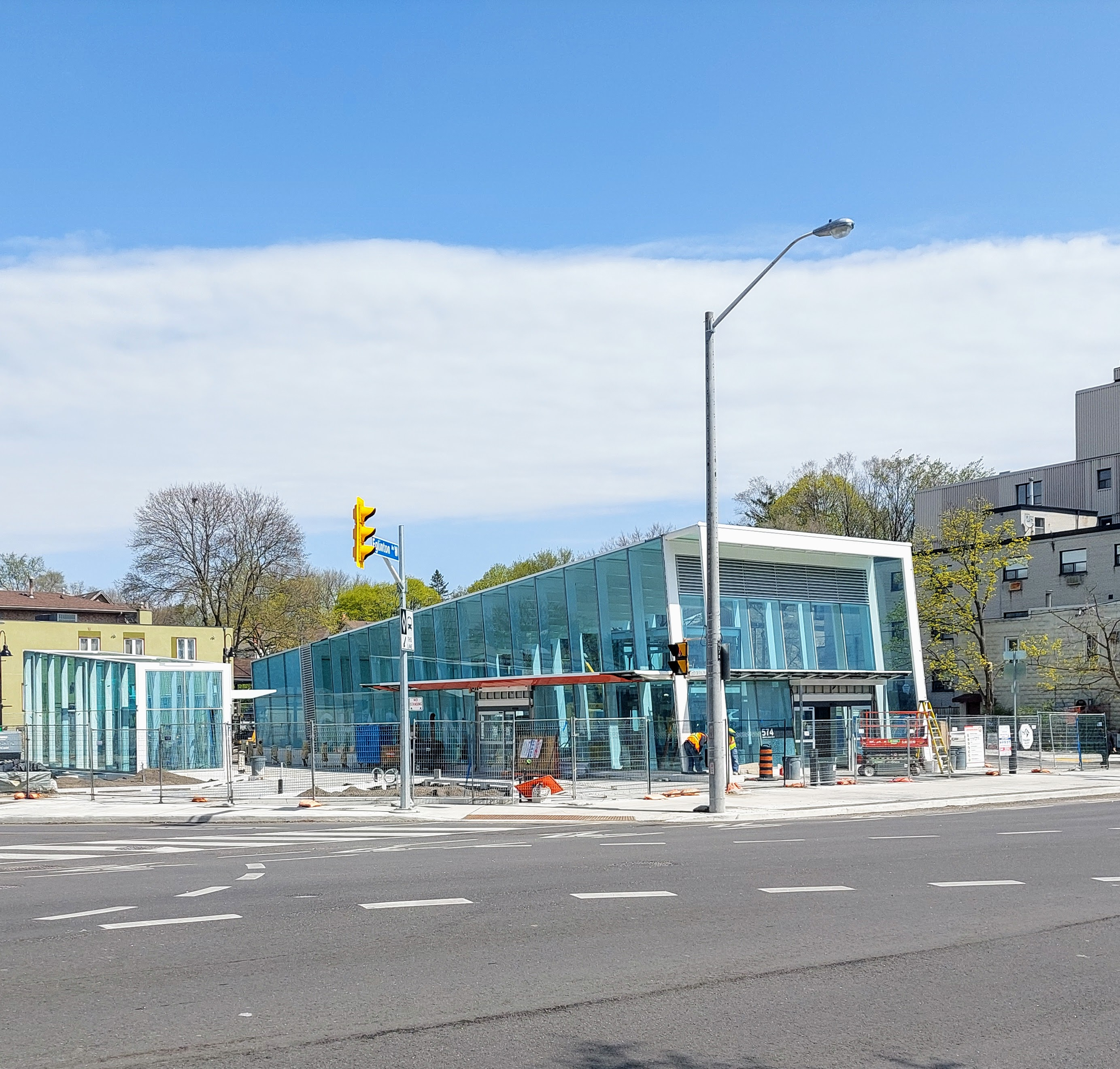
2023: Main entrance of Chaplin station

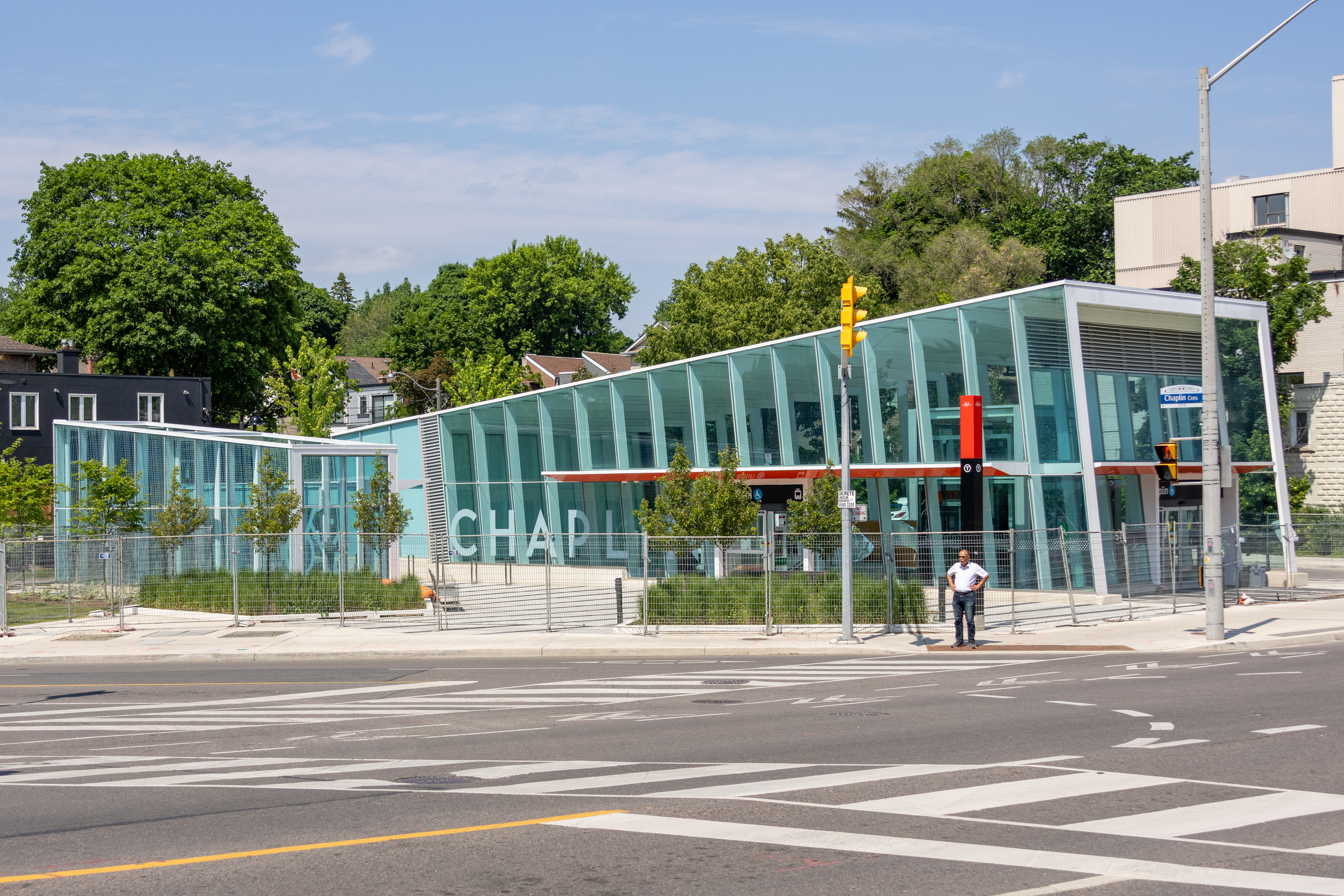
2025: Main entrance of Chaplin station

=== Dawes Road ===
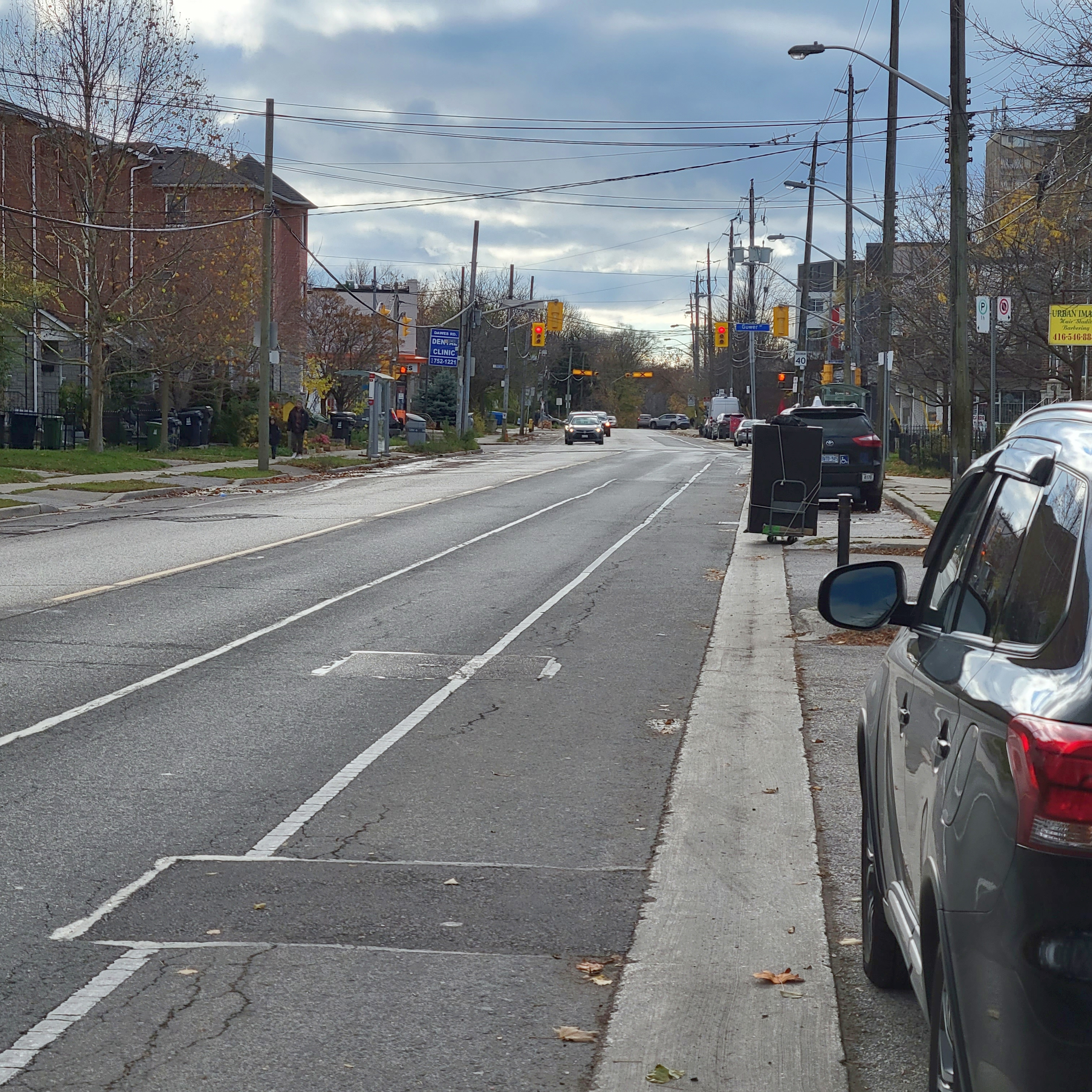
Dawes Road in 2022

Dawes Road
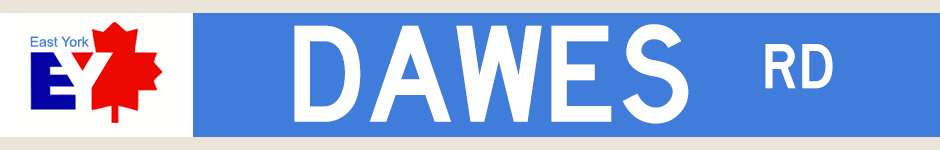
- Location: South of Danforth Avenue – Pharmacy Avenue

Dawes Road is a spur of Victoria Park Avenue, and the original roadway through the Taylor-Massey Creek ravine. The road is named for Clem Dawes, a farmer on Lot 2 Concession 2 of York Township and later a hotel owner. The street between Victoria Park Avenue and Pharmacy Avenue is an east–west road running just south of St. Clair Avenue. There is a 50-metre (160 ft) gap between the east–west Dawes Road and the diagonal Dawes Road along Victoria Park Avenue.

Dawes Road is served by TTC route 23 Dawes.

=== Trethewey Drive ===
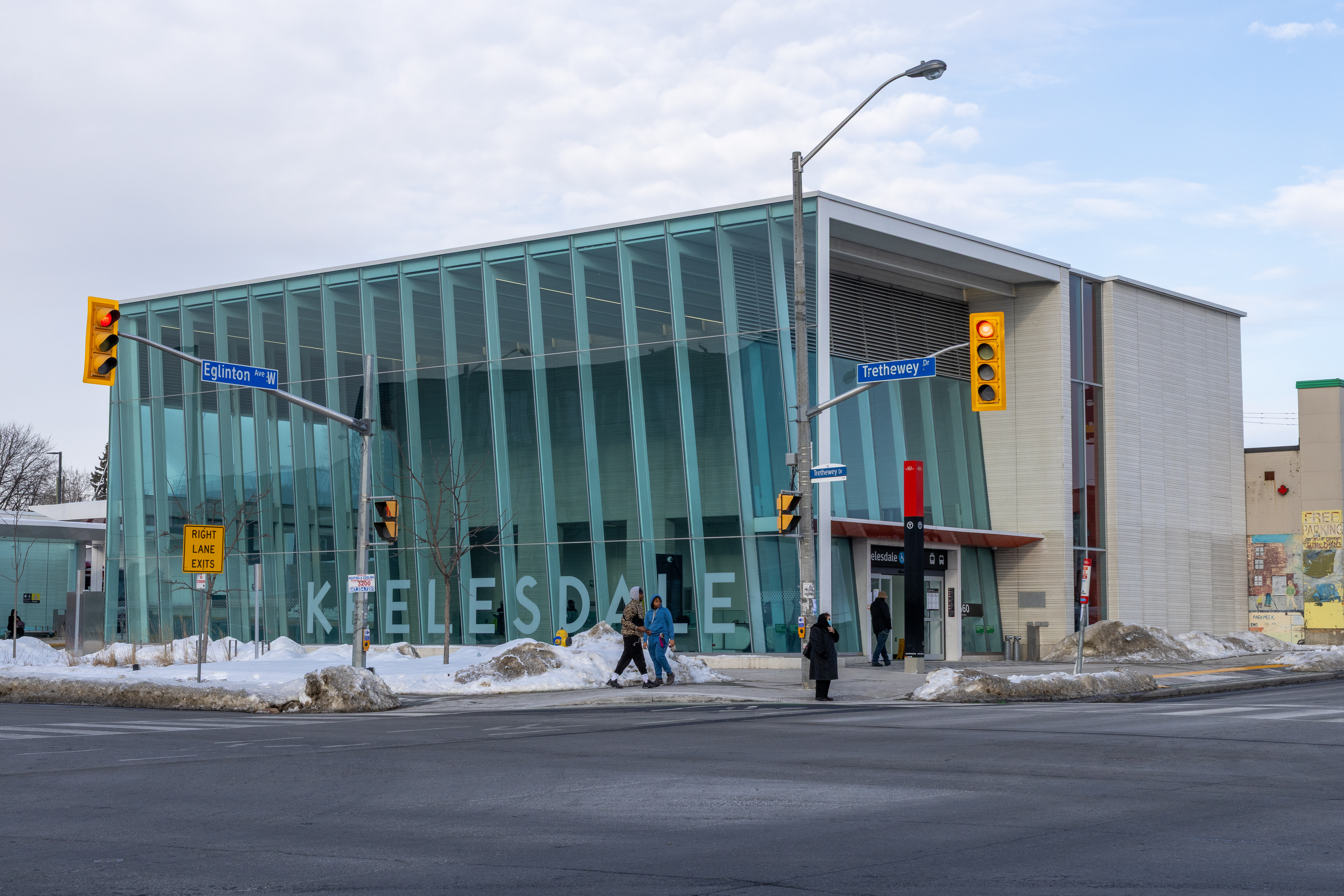
Keelesdale station in 2026

Trethewey Drive
- Location: Eglinton Avenue (continues as Keele Street) to Jane Street

Trethewey Drive, formerly named Holmstead Drive, was a private rural road on the land of mining magnate and owner of the Trethewey Model Farm William Griffith Trethewey (1865–1926). In 1910, the property became the site of Toronto's first airplane flight, with French ace Count Jacques de Lesseps circling the city. Trethewey Airfield, later renamed De Lesseps Field, hosted de Havilland's facilities and the Royal Canadian Air Force before the land was sold for development in 1941. The boroughs of North York and York later assumed control of the road.

The street serves by TTC route 158 since the opening of the first phase of Line 5 Eglinton in February 2026 with the bus terminating at Keelesdale station's bus bay. Trethewey Drive was formerly served by TTC route 32C Eglinton West (a branch of 32 Eglinton West), which was once part of the former route 83 until 1972.

=== Vaughan Road ===
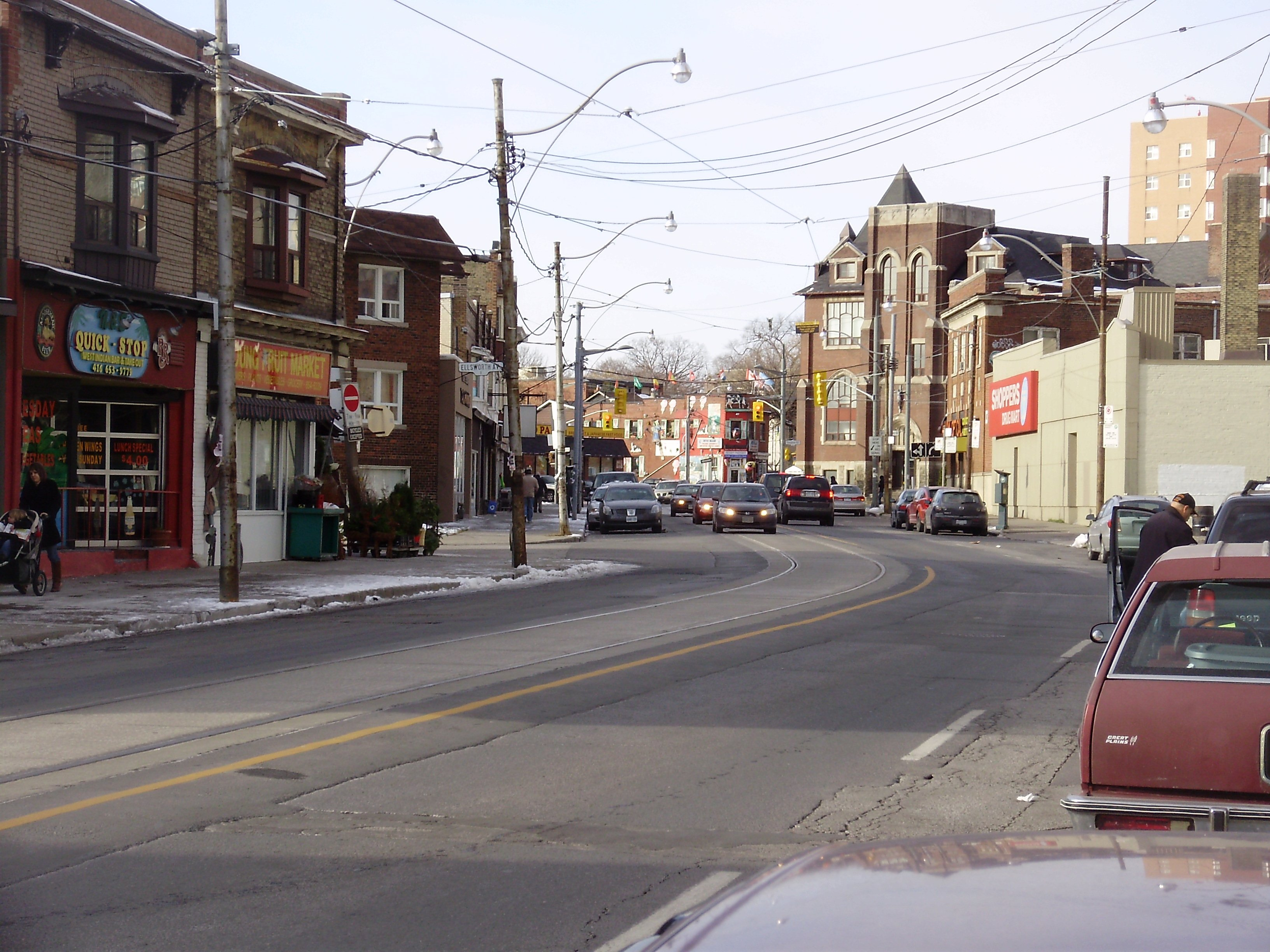
Vaughan Road is aligned northwest–southeast between Bathurst Street and St. Clair Avenue West as seen in 2008. Note the single southbound non-revenue streetcar track in the Old Toronto segment used to connect the 512 St. Clair streetcar route with the rest of the system.

Vaughan Road
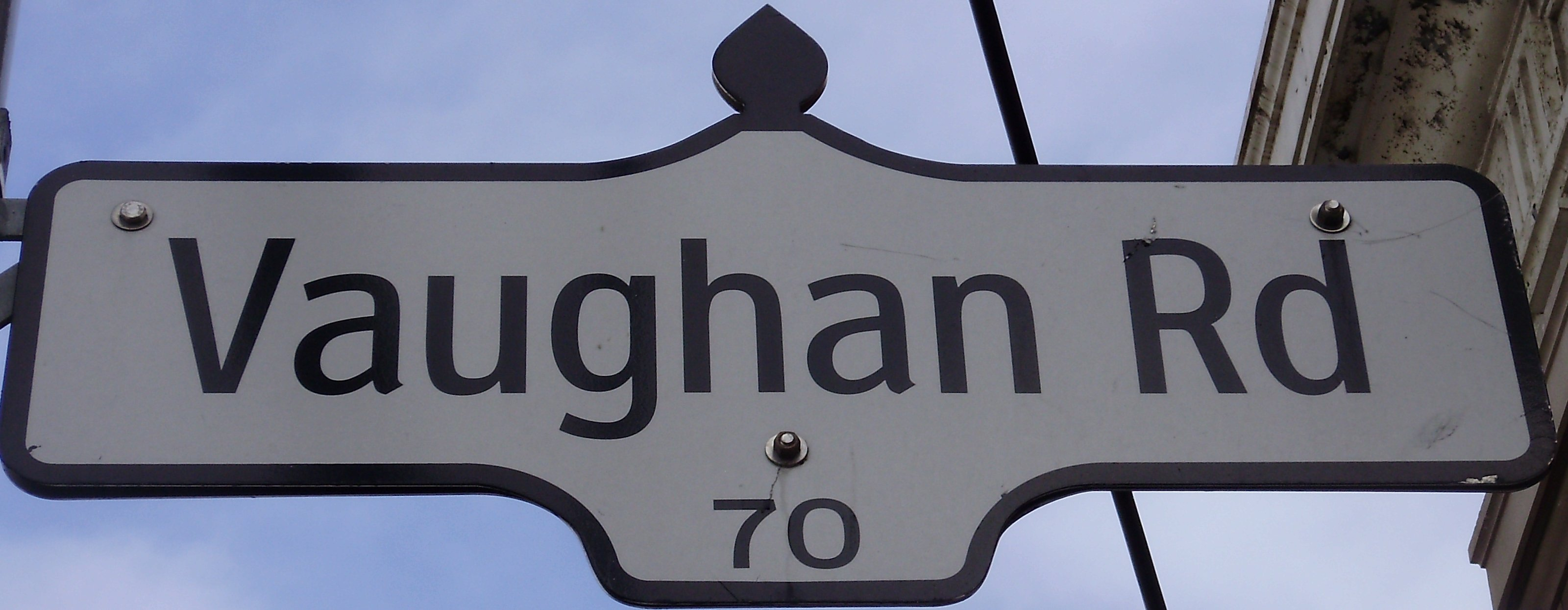
- Location: Bathurst Street – near the intersection of Dufferin Street and Eglinton Avenue

Vaughan Road is named after the Township (later City) of Vaughan, which in turn was named after Benjamin Vaughan, a British commissioner whose role was to smooth negotiations between Great Britain and the newly independent United States during the drafting of the Treaty of Paris in 1783. The street's original alignment led to the namesake township until the street was shortened. The neighbourhood of Oakwood–Vaughan (later officially renamed Oakwood Village for the main commercial strip on Oakwood Avenue at Rogers Road), as well as the former Toronto District School Board (TDSB) high school Vaughan Road Academy, are named after this street. Vaughan Road's contour is the result of it being parallel to the buried Castle Frank Brook to the northeast.

Vaughan Road is served by TTC bus route 90. There is a non-revenue southbound streetcar track on the road south of St. Clair Avenue to allow 512 St. Clair streetcars to use the depots located closer to the lakeshore by the rest of the TTC streetcar system as the 512 St. Clair streetcar route is otherwise disconnected from the rest of the system. Bathurst Street from Vaughan Road to St. Clair Avenue only has a northbound streetcar track.

Fairbank station on Line 5 Eglinton LRT, which opened in February 2026 with the rest of the first phase, is located a few metres from Vaughan Road's northwesternmost end. However, route 90 Vaughan does not serve this station; it began serving Oakwood station and Cedarvale station on the same LRT line instead in October 2025; Cedarvale station is also on Line 1 Yonge–University as an interchange station with Line 5.

== See also ==
- Lists of roads in Toronto
  - List of east–west roads in Toronto
  - List of north–south roads in Toronto
  - List of notable streets in Toronto
