= Mario De Grassi =

Mario De Grassi may refer to:

- Mario De Grassi (footballer, born 1919) (1919–1999), Italian who played for Roma
- Mario De Grassi (footballer, born 1937) (1937–2025), Italian who played for Triestina
