= Filippo De Grassi =

Filippo "Philip" De Grassi (1793–1877) was an Italian soldier of fortune and influential player in the Rebellion of 1837 in Upper Canada.

De Grassi was born in Rome, Italy in 1793 to lawyer Alfio Mariano Grassi and Anna Elizabetha Brumaritz, daughter of an Austrian Baron. De Grassi served as a captain in Napoleon's French Army during the Peninsular War.

During the war De Grassi was captured by the British and shipped to England. It was there he obtained a commission in the York Light Infantry Volunteers regiment of the British Army.

He was sent to the British West Indies and served there from 1812 to 1815. After his tour, he returned to England and made a living by teaching languages. In 1831 De Grassi and his family moved to Canada and settled in York, Upper Canada. He owned free land as a result of his military service at Don Mills Road and the Don River.

As father, his involvement in the Family Compact came via two of his daughters, Cornelia De Grassi (approx. 1822–d. 1885) and Charlotte De Grassi (approx. 1822–d. 1872), whom were romantically involved in this powerful political clan. In Canada De Grassi was involved in the local militia. He later moved to Lindsay, Ontario, where he died in 1877. His son Alexander De Grassi was a businessman in Toronto.

De Grassi Street in Toronto was named in his honour; the name has gained international recognition through the Degrassi television series.

== Bibliography ==
- The Story of Charlotte and Cornelia de Grassi, The MacMillan Dictionary of Canadian Biography by W. Stewart Wallace. Toronto 1963
