= Di Grassi =

Surname

Di Grassi is a surname. Notable people with the surname include:

- Giacomo di Grassi (16th century), Italian fencing master
- Lucas di Grassi (born 1984), Brazilian racing driver

== See also ==
- De Grassi (disambiguation)
- Degrassi (disambiguation)
