= List of Warner Bros. Discovery television programs =

This is a list of television series that were produced, distributed, or owned by Warner Bros. Discovery's brands, including Warner Bros. Television Studios, Warner Bros. Animation, Hanna-Barbera, Warner Horizon Television, Warner Horizon Unscripted Television, Telepictures, HBO, TBS, TNT Originals, TruTV, CNN, Cartoon Network, Discovery Channel, and several predecessor companies.

== Warner Bros. Discovery Streaming & Studios ==
=== Warner Bros. Entertainment ===
==== Warner Bros. Television Studios ====
Title	Genre	Years	Network	Co-production with	Notes
Warner Bros. Presents	Wheel series	1955–1956	ABC		
Casablanca	Cold War spy/intrigue	1955–1956	ABC		Based on the 1942 film by Warner Bros. Pictures
Cheyenne	Western	1955–1962	ABC		
Conflict	Anthology	1956–1957	ABC		
Sugarfoot	Western	1957–1960	ABC		
Colt .45	Western	1957–1960	ABC		
Maverick	Western	1957–1962	ABC		
Lawman	Western	1958–1962	ABC		
Bronco	Western	1958–1962	ABC		
77 Sunset Strip	Crime drama	1958–1964	ABC		
The Alaskans	Adventure	1959–1960	ABC		
Bourbon Street Beat	Private detective	1959–1960	ABC		
Hawaiian Eye	Private detective	1959–1963	ABC		
The Bugs Bunny Show	Animated/Anthology	1960–2000	ABC/CBS		
The Roaring 20's	Drama	1960–1962	ABC		
Surfside 6	Private detective	1960–1962	ABC		
Room for One More	Sitcom	1962	ABC		
The Gallant Men	Fiction	1962–1963	ABC		
GE True	Anthology	1962–1963	CBS		
The Dakotas	Western	1963	ABC		
Temple Houston	Western	1963–1964	NBC	Apollo Productions, Inc.	
Wendy and Me	Sitcom	1964–1965	ABC	Natwill Productions	
No Time for Sergeants	Sitcom	1964–1965	ABC	McCadden Productions	Based on the 1958 film by Warner Bros. Pictures
F Troop	Sitcom	1965–1967	ABC		
Mister Roberts	Sitcom	1965–1966	NBC		
Hank	Sitcom	1965–1966	NBC		
The F.B.I.	Police procedural	1965–1974	ABC	QM Productions	
The Road Runner Show	Animated/Anthology	1966–1972	CBS/ABC		
Tarzan	Adventure	1966–1968	NBC	National General Corporation, Banner Productions	Distributor
The Chicago Teddy Bears	Sitcom	1971	CBS	Dean Jones Productions, Inc.	
The New Dick Van Dyke Show	Sitcom	1971–1974	CBS		
Nichols	Western	1971–1972	NBC	Cherokee Productions	
The Jimmy Stewart Show	Sitcom	1971–1972	NBC	J-K/Ablidon Productions	
The Merrie Melodies Show	Anthology	1972	Syndication		
Search	Science fiction	1972–1973	NBC	Leslie Stevens Productions	
Banyon	Detective fiction	1972–1973	NBC	QM Productions	
The Delphi Bureau	Dramatic television series	1972–1973	ABC		
The Brian Keith Show	Sitcom	1972–1974	NBC	Miguel Productions	
The Streets of San Francisco	Crime drama	1972–1977	ABC	QM Productions (pilot and season one only)	
Kung Fu	Action	1972–1975	ABC		
The Cowboys	Western	1974	ABC		
Kodiak	Drama	1974	ABC	Kodiak Productions	
The New Land	Drama	1974	ABC		
Shoulder to Shoulder	Historical drama	1974	BBC Two	BBC	mini-series
Harry O	Detective fiction	1974–1976	ABC		
Give-n-Take	Game show	1975	CBS		
The Neighbors	Game show	1975–1976	ABC		
Wonder Woman	Superhero	1975–1979	ABC/CBS	The Douglas S. Cramer Company and Bruce Lansbury Productions, Ltd.	Based on Wonder Woman by William Moulton Marston and H. G. Peter
Alice	Sitcom	1976–1985	CBS	D'Angelo-Bullock-Allen Productions (1976–77) (season 1)	Based on the 1974 film Alice Doesn't Live Here Anymore by Robert Getchell
Code R	Action	1977	CBS		
Rafferty	Medical drama	1977	CBS		
Second Chance	Game show	1977	ABC		
Roots	Historical drama	1977	ABC		
The Fitzpatricks	Drama	1977–1978	CBS		
The Daffy Duck Show	Animated/Anthology	1978–1979	NBC		
Life on Earth	Nature documentary	1979	BBC Two	BBC Natural History Unit and Reiner E. Moritz Productions	
Roots: The Next Generations	Miniseries	1979	ABC	The Wolper Organization	
Time Express	Fantasy drama	1979	CBS		
Dorothy	Sitcom	1979	CBS	The Konigsberg Company & Davis-Carroll Productions	
California Fever	Teen drama	1979	CBS	Lou Step Productions	
The Dukes of Hazzard	Action comedy	1979–1985	CBS	Paul R. Picard Productions and Piggy Productions, Inc. (season 1) Lou Step Productions (seasons 2–7)	
Young Maverick	Western	1979–1980	CBS		
Flo	Sitcom	1980–1981	CBS		
Enos	Sitcom	1980–1981	CBS	Lou Step Productions	
Freddie and the Bean	Action comedy	1980–1981	CBS		Based on the 1974 film by Warner Bros. Pictures
Park Place	Sitcom	1981	CBS	Starry Night Productions	
Private Benjamin	Sitcom	1981–1983	CBS		Based on the 1980 film by Warner Bros. Pictures
Love, Sidney	Sitcom	1981–1983	NBC	R.G. Productions Inc.	
Bret Maverick	Western	1981–1982	NBC	Cherokee Productions	
Bare Essence	Soap opera	1983	NBC		
The Thorn Birds	Drama	1983	ABC	Edward Lewis Productions	mini-series
Casablanca	World War II spy/intrigue	1983	NBC		Based on the 1942 film by Warner Bros. Pictures
The Dukes	Action comedy	1983	CBS	Hanna-Barbera	An expansion of The Dukes of Hazzard by Warner Bros. Television
Wizards and Warriors	Adventure	1983	CBS	Don Reo Productions	
High Performance	Adventure	1983	ABC	Lou Step Productions	
Goodnight, Beantown	Sitcom	1983–1984	CBS	Bixby-Brandon Productions Inc.	
The Mississippi	Legal drama	1983–1984	CBS	Ralph Waite Productions and Hajeno Productions	
The Yellow Rose	Soap opera	1983–1984	NBC	John Wilder-Michael Zinberg Productions	
Scarecrow and Mrs. King	Action	1983–1987	CBS	Shoot the Moon Enterprises Inc. and B&E Enterprises (episodes 1-11)	
Steambath	Comedy drama	1984	Showtime	Joe Byrne/Falrose and Pollock/Davis, Inc.	
V: The Series	Science fiction	1984–1985	NBC	Daniel H. Blatt-Robert Singer Productions	
Night Court	Sitcom	1984–1992	NBC	Starry Night Productions (seasons 1–6)	
Off the Rack	Sitcom	1984–1985	ABC	Brownstone and Mugwump Productions	
Eye to Eye	Detective Drama	1985	ABC	Eustis and Elias and an S. A. Vail Productions and Mut, Inc.	
Double Dare	Drama	1985	CBS	Terry Hughes Productions, December Enterprises, Inc. and Wanderers Productions, Inc.	
I Had Three Wives	Comedy drama	1985	CBS	Brownstone and Mugwump Productions	
Spenser: For Hire	Crime drama	1985–1988	ABC	John Wilder Productions (season 1) and Jadda Productions (season 2)	Based upon Spenser novels by Robert B. Parker
Growing Pains	Sitcom	1985–1992	ABC	Guntzelman-Sullivan-Marshall Productions (seasons 5–6)	
North and South	Historical fiction	1985–1986; 1994	ABC	David L. Wolper Productions	
Shadow Chasers	Science fiction	1985–1986	ABC	Kenneth Johnson/Brian Grazer Productions	
Head of the Class	Sitcom	1986–1991	ABC	Eustis/Elias Productions	
My Sister Sam	Sitcom	1986–1988	CBS	Pony Productions	
Shell Game	Comedy drama	1987	CBS	Lou-Step Productions	
Ohara	Police procedural	1987–1988	ABC	Imagine Television and M*ass Production	
The Days and Nights of Molly Dodd	Comedy drama	1987–1991	NBC/Lifetime	You And Me Kid Productions	
Full House	Sitcom	1987–1995	ABC	Jeff Franklin Productions and Miller-Boyett Productions	1987–1988 episodes from Lorimar-Telepictures; 1988–1993 episodes from Lorimar Television
Just in Time	Sitcom	1988	ABC		
China Beach	Medical drama/War	1988–1991	ABC	Sacret, Inc.	Inspired by Home Before Morning by Lynda Van Devanter
Police Academy: The Animated Series	Animated	1988–1989	Syndication	Ruby-Spears Enterprises	Based on the 1984 film and its sequels by Warner Bros. Pictures
Superman	Action	1988	Syndication	Ruby-Spears Enterprises	
Just the Ten of Us	Sitcom	1988–1990	ABC	Guntzelman-Sullivan-Marshall Productions	
Murphy Brown	Sitcom	1988–1998; 2018	CBS	Shukovsky-English Productions/Entertainment (Seasons 1–10) and Bend in the Road Productions (Season 11)	
Superboy	Superhero	1988–1992	Syndication	Alexander and Ilya Salkind Productions, Cantharus Productions, Lowry Productions and DC Comics	Distributed by CBS Media Ventures and Warner Bros. Television Distribution
A Man Called Hawk	Drama	1989	ABC	Hattman-Yates Productions and Avery Brooks Productions	Based upon the lead character by Robert B. Parker
Beetlejuice	Animated	1989–1991	ABC/Fox Kids	Tim Burton Inc., Nelvana and The Geffen Film Company	Based on the 1988 film by The Geffen Film Company
Tales from the Crypt	Horror/Anthology	1989–1996	HBO	Tales From the Crypt Holdings	
Life Goes On	Family drama	1989–1993	ABC	Toots Productions	
Family Matters	Sitcom	1989–1998	ABC/CBS	Bickley-Warren Productions and Miller-Boyett Productions	1989–1993 episodes from Lorimar Television (seasons 1–4);
Molloy	Sitcom	1990	Fox	The Lee Rich Company	
The Flash	Superhero	1990–1991	CBS	Pet Fly Productions	
The Fresh Prince of Bel-Air	Sitcom	1990–1996	NBC	The Stuffed Dog Company, Quincy Jones Entertainment (1990–1993), (seasons 1–3), Quincy Jones-David Salzman Entertainment (1993–1996), (seasons 4–6) and NBC Productions	NBCUniversal owns the copyrights to the series, WB only handles worldwide distribution since 1994
Swamp Thing	Science fiction	1990–1993	USA Network	Batfilm Productions, Inc., BBK Productions, Inc. DIC Entertainment and MCA Television Entertainment	Distributed by NBCUniversal Syndication Studios and Warner Bros. Domestic Television Distribution
Sisters	Family drama	1991–1996	NBC	Cowlip Productions	1991–1993 episodes from Lorimar Television (1991–1993) (seasons 1–3)
Step by Step	Sitcom	1991–1998	ABC/CBS	Bickley-Warren Productions and Miller-Boyett Productions	1991–1993 episodes from Lorimar Television (seasons 1–2)
Billy	Sitcom	1992	ABC	Eustis/Elias Productions	
Human Target	Action	1992	ABC	Pet Fly Productions	
Angel Street	Crime drama	1992	CBS	John Wells and Friends	
Room for Two	Sitcom	1992	ABC	Big Deal, Inc. and Phantom Productions	
Hangin' with Mr. Cooper	Sitcom	1992–1997	ABC	Bickley-Warren Productions and Jeff Franklin Productions	1992–1993 episodes from Lorimar Television (season 1)
Family Dog	Animated	1993	CBS	Amblin Television, Tim Burton Inc., Nelvana and Universal Television	WB has international distribution rights outside the U.S., domestic distribution rights are handled by NBCUniversal Syndication Studios
Tall Hopes	Sitcom	1993	CBS	Eustis/Elias Productions	
The Trouble with Larry	Sitcom	1993	CBS	Highest Common Denominator Productions and Meleager Productions	
It Had to Be You	Sitcom	1993	CBS	Highest Common Denominator Productions	
Family Album	Sitcom	1993	CBS	Bright/Kauffman/Crane Productions	
Against the Grain	Drama	1993	NBC	The Lee Rich Company and Magnum Productions	
Time Trax	Science fiction	1993–1994	PTEN	Gary Nardino Productions	1993 episodes from Lorimar Television (season 1)
Getting By	Sitcom	1993–1994	ABC/NBC	Bickley-Warren Productions and Miller-Boyett Productions	1993 episodes from Lorimar Television (season 1)
The Adventures of Brisco County Jr.	Weird western	1993–1994	Fox	Boam/Cuse Productions	
Café Americain	Sitcom	1993–1994	NBC	Peter Noah Productions	
Living Single	Sitcom	1993–1998	Fox	SisterLee Productions (1994–1998) (seasons 2–5)	
Kung Fu: The Legend Continues	Action	1993–1997	PTEN	Warner Bros. Distributing Canada Ltd.	
Lois & Clark: The New Adventures of Superman	Superhero	1993–1997	ABC	Gangbuster Films, Inc. (pilot), Roundelay Productions (1993–1994) (season 1) and December 3 Productions (1994–1997) (seasons 2–4)	
The John Larroquette Show	Sitcom	1993–1996	NBC	Port Street Films, Impact Zone Productions and Witt/Thomas Productions	
Tales from the Cryptkeeper	Animated	1993–1999	ABC/CBS	EC Comics and Nelvana	Owned by Nelvana
Tom	Sitcom	1994	CBS	Wapello County Productions	
Free Willy	Animated	1994	ABC	Le Studio Canal+, Donner/Shuler-Donner Productions, Nelvana, Regency Enterprises and Warner Bros. Animation	Based on the 1993 film by Warner Bros. Pictures
Daddy's Girls	Sitcom	1994	CBS	Carydan Productions and Witt/Thomas Productions	
The George Carlin Show	Sitcom	1994–1995	Fox	Sweet Freedom Productions and Main Sequence	
On Our Own	Sitcom	1994–1995	ABC	Lightkeeper Productions, de Passe Entertainment and Miller-Boyett Productions	
Something Wilder	Sitcom	1994–1995	NBC	The Kellman Company	
Under Suspicion	Police drama	1994–1995	CBS	Magdalene Productions and Lakeside Productions, Inc.	
Babylon 5	Space opera	1994–1998	PTEN/TNT	Babylonian Productions Inc.	
Friends	Sitcom	1994–2004	NBC	Bright/Kauffman/Crane Productions	
ER	Medical drama	1994–2009	NBC	Constant c Productions and Amblin Television	
Pointman	Action	1995	PTEN	Pointman Productions, Inc.	
The History of Rock 'n' Roll	Music	1995	PTEN	Andrew Solt Productions, Quincy Jones/David Salzman Entertainment, in association with Telepictures Productions, and Time-Life Video & Television	Documentary mini-series
Muscle	Sitcom	1995	The WB	Boone County Productions and Witt/Thomas Productions	
Medicine Ball	Medical drama	1995	Fox	Lakeside Productions and Crystal Beach Entertainment	
The Great Defender	Drama	1995	Fox	Schenck/Cardea Productions	
Charlie Grace	Crime drama	1995	ABC	Wings Productions and December 3 Productions	
The Monroes	Soap opera	1995	ABC	Rebel Heart Productions and Elliot Friedgen Company	
Double Rush	Sitcom	1995	CBS	Shukovsky English Entertainment	
The Office	Sitcom	1995	CBS	5 a.m., Inc. and Witt/Thomas Productions	
Dweebs	Sitcom	1995	CBS	Peter Noah Productions	
New York News	Drama	1995	CBS	Sander/Moses Productions and Round Two Productions	
The Wayans Bros.	Sitcom	1995–1999	The WB	BabyWay Productions and Next to Last Productions	
The Parent 'Hood	Sitcom	1995–1999	The WB	Highest Common Denominator Productions (1995, season 1), The Townsend Entertainment Company (1995–1999) (seasons 2–5) and Warren & Rinsler Productions (1995–1998); (seasons 2–4)	
In the House	Sitcom	1995–1999	NBC/UPN/Syndication	Winifred Hervey Productions, Quincy Jones-David Salzman Entertainment, NBC Productions (seasons 1–2) and NBC Studios (1996–98) (seasons 3–5)	WB takes over production from season 5 onwards
Hope & Gloria	Sitcom	1995–1996	NBC	Team Steinkellner Productions	
High Society	Sitcom	1995–1996	CBS	JVTV and Look Ma Productions	
Bless This House	Sitcom	1995–1996	CBS	Mohawk Productions	
The Client	Legal drama	1995–1996	CBS	Michael Filerman Productions, Judith Paige Mitchell Productions and Regency Enterprises	Based on The Client by John Grisham
Minor Adjustments	Sitcom	1995–1996	NBC/UPN	Ken Estin Entertainment and Witt/Thomas Productions	
Too Something	Sitcom	1995–1996	Fox		
Kirk	Sitcom	1995–1996	The WB	Bickley-Warren Productions	
Ace Ventura: Pet Detective	Animated	1995–2000	CBS/Nickelodeon	Nelvana and Morgan Creek Productions	Rights now owned by Revolution Studios
The Drew Carey Show	Sitcom	1995–2004	ABC	Mohawk Productions	
Mad TV	Sketch comedy	1995–2016	Fox/The CW	Quincy Jones-David Salzman Entertainment, Bahr/Small Productions (1995–97) (seasons 1–3); Epicenter Ventures (2016) (special; season 15), Montgomery Studios and Teitelbaum Artists (2016) (season 15)	
Access Hollywood	Entertainment news	1996–2026	Syndication	NBC Studios	WB took control of the distribution of the series in 1999 from 20th Television, WB stopped distributing Access in 2001
Lush Life	Sitcom	1996	Fox	SisterLee Productions	
Party Girl	Sitcom	1996	Fox	Subway Productions	Based on the 1995 film
The Show	Sitcom	1996	Fox	Black Rose Productions	
Local Heroes	Sitcom	1996	Fox	No Humans Were Harmed Productions and Witt/Thomas Productions	
Mr. & Mrs. Smith	Crime drama	1996	CBS	Page Two Productions and Bakula Productions, Inc.	
My Guys	Sitcom	1996	CBS	Cherp Productions and Witt/Thomas Productions	
Common Law	Sitcom	1996	ABC	Witt/Thomas Productions	
Life with Roger	Sitcom	1996–1997	The WB		
Pearl	Sitcom	1996–1997	CBS	Impact Zone Productions and Witt/Thomas Productions	
Nick Freno: Licensed Teacher	Sitcom	1996–1998	The WB	Warren and Rinsler Productions	
Suddenly Susan	Sitcom	1996–2000	NBC		
The Jamie Foxx Show	Sitcom	1996–2001	The WB	Bent Outta Shape Productions and Foxxhole Productions	
Chicago Sons	Sitcom	1997	NBC	Three Sisters Entertainment and Frontier Pictures	
Prince Street	Cop Drama	1997	NBC	Writer's Workbench Films	
Spy Game	Action	1997	ABC	McNamara Paper Products, Inc., Renaissance Pictures and Universal Television	
Leaving L.A.	Drama	1997	ABC	Rebel Heart Productions	
The Shining	Psychological horror	1997	ABC		
Meego	Science fiction	1997	CBS	Miller-Boyett-Warren Productions	
Built to Last	Sitcom	1997	NBC	Lightkeeper Productions	
La Femme Nikita	Action	1997–2001	CTV Television Network; USA Network	Baton Broadcasting, LPN Productions, Inc. and Fireworks Entertainment	Based on the 1990 film by Luc Besson
Veronica's Closet	Sitcom	1997–2000	NBC	Bright/Kauffman/Crane Productions	
Prey	Science fiction	1998	ABC	Edelson Productions and Lars Thorwald Inc.	
Kelly Kelly	Sitcom	1998	The WB	ItzBinso Long Productions and Utility Pictures	
Maximum Bob	Comedy drama	1998	ABC	Sonnenfeld Josephson Worldwide Entertainment	
The Brian Benben Show	Sitcom	1998	CBS	CBS Productions	
The Closer	Sitcom	1998	CBS	T.W.S. II Productions, Frontier Pictures and CBS Productions	
Vengeance Unlimited	Crime drama	1998–1999	ABC	McNamara Paper Products	
Trinity	Family drama	1998–1999	NBC	John Wells Productions	
Brimstone	Drama	1998–1999	Fox	Lars Thorwald Inc.	
Hyperion Bay	Drama	1998–1999	The WB	Jarndyce & Jarndyce and South Productions	
Two of a Kind	Sitcom	1998–1999	ABC	Griffard/Adler Productions, Dualstar Productions and Miller-Boyett-Warren Productions	
Jesse	Sitcom	1998–2000	NBC	Bright/Kauffman/Crane Productions	
For Your Love	Sitcom	1998–2002	NBC/The WB	SisterLee Productions	
Will & Grace	Sitcom	1998–2006	NBC	3 Sisters Entertainment, KoMut Entertainment, NBC Studios (1998–2004), and NBC Universal Television Studio (2004–2006)	Domestic television distributor
Everything's Relative	Sitcom	1999	NBC	The Hurwitz Company, Witt/Thomas Productions and NBC Studios	
The Chimp Channel	Sitcom	1999	TBS	Telescopic Pictures	
Katie Joplin	Sitcom	1999	The WB		
Crusade	Space opera	1999	TNT	Babylonian Productions Inc.	
The PJs	Black sitcom/Adult animated	1999–2001	Fox/The WB	Imagine Television, Touchstone Television (1999–2000) (season 1–2), The Murphy Company and Will Vinton Studios (2001) (season 3)	Season 3 only
Mission Hill	Animated sitcom	1999–2002	The WB/Cartoon Network (Adult Swim)	Castle Rock Entertainment, Film Roman and Bill Oakley/Josh Weinstein Productions	Distribution only layouts by Studio B Productions & Funbag Animation Studios with overseas work done by AKOM & New Millennium Animation
Odd Man Out	Sitcom	1999–2000	ABC	Frontier Pictures	
The Strip	Action	1999–2000	UPN	Silver Pictures Television and Millar Gough Ink	
The Norm Show	Sitcom	1999–2001	ABC	Mohawk Productions	
Jack & Jill	Comedy drama	1999–2001	The WB	The Canton Company and 22¢ Films	
Third Watch	Crime drama	1999–2005	NBC	John Wells Productions	
The West Wing	Political drama	1999–2006	NBC	John Wells Productions	
Freedom	Science fiction	2000	UPN	Silver Pictures Television and Pandaemonium Pictures Limited	
Opposite Sex	Comedy drama	2000	Fox		
Bull	Drama	2000	TNT	Nooch Company	
Hype	Sketch comedy	2000–2001	The WB	Tollin/Robbins Productions	
The Fugitive	Action	2000–2001	CBS	Kopelson Entertainment (2000) (season 1), Kopelson Telemedia (2000–2001) (season 1) and McNamara Paper Products	Based on The Fugitive by Roy Huggins
Baby Blues	Animated sitcom	2000–2002	The WB (episodes 1–8)/Adult Swim (episodes 9–13)	King Features Syndicate, Rough Draft Studios, and Split the Difference Productions	
Nikki	Sitcom	2000–2002	The WB	Mohawk Productions	
X-Men: Evolution	Superhero	2000–2003	Kids' WB	Marvel Studios and Film Roman	International distribution only; U.S. rights owned by Disney Platform Distribution
Gilmore Girls	Comedy drama	2000–2007	The WB/The CW	Dorothy Parker Drank Here Productions and Hofflund/Polone	
Queer as Folk	Drama	2000–2005	Showtime	Tony Jonas Productions, Cowlip Productions, Temple Street Productions, Channel 4 and Showtime Networks	International distribution rights only, domestic distribution rights are with CBS Media Ventures
Citizen Baines	Drama	2001	CBS	John Wells Productions, Lydia Woodward Productions and ThinkFilm	
Night Visions	Horror	2001	Fox	Angel/Brown Productions	
Thieves	Drama	2001	ABC	Hoosier Karma and Kopelson Entertainment	
The Oblongs	Animated sitcom	2001–2002	The WB/Adult Swim	Jobsite Productions, Film Roman, Oblong Productions and Mohawk Productions with overseas work done by AKOM & Rough Draft Studios	Layouts by KMC Films, Funbag Animation Studios & Atomic Cartoons
Witchblade	Superhero	2001–2002	TNT	Camelot Pictures, Halsted Pictures, Mythic Films and Top Cow Productions	
The Nightmare Room	Anthology	2001–2002	Kids' WB	Parachute Entertainment and Tollin/Robbins Productions	
Off Centre	Sitcom	2001–2002	The WB	DreamWorks Television and Weitz, Weitz and Zuker	
Maybe It's Me	Sitcom	2001–2002	The WB	SamJen Productions and Touchstone Television	
Smallville	Action	2001–2011	The WB/The CW	Tollin/Robbins Productions, Millar Gough Ink, and DC Comics	
The Court	Legal drama	2002	ABC	John Wells Productions	
My Guide to Becoming a Rock Star	Comedy	2002	The WB	Company Pictures and Tiny Hat Productions	Based on the British series The Young Person's Guide to Becoming a Rock Star by Bryan Elsey
Presidio Med	Medical drama	2002–2003	CBS	Lydia Woodward Productions and John Wells Productions	
Fastlane	Action	2002–2003	Fox	McNamara Paper Products and Wonderland Sound and Vision	
Birds of Prey	Action	2002–2003	The WB	Tollin/Robbins Productions and Flash Film Works	
Good Morning, Miami	Sitcom	2002–2003	NBC	KoMut Entertainment	
The Jamie Kennedy Experiment	Reality	2002–2004	The WB	Bahr-Small Productions, Karz Entertainment and Big Ticket Entertainment	WB has international distribution rights, domestic distribution rights are with CBS Media Ventures
Everwood	Drama	2002–2006	The WB	Berlanti-Liddell Productions	
What I Like About You	Sitcom	2002–2006	The WB	Tollin/Robbins Productions	
George Lopez	Sitcom	2002–2007	ABC	Fortis Productions and Mohawk Productions	
Without a Trace	Police procedural	2002–2009	CBS	Jerry Bruckheimer Television, CBS Productions (2002–2006) (seasons 1–4), and CBS Paramount Network Television (2006–2009) (seasons 5–7)	
Wanda at Large	Sitcom	2003	Fox	Mohawk Productions	
Black Sash	Action	2003	The WB	The Sash Films Inc. and Tollin/Robbins Productions	
Skin	Drama	2003	Fox	Jerry Bruckheimer Television and Hoosier Karma Productions	
On the Spot	Comedy	2003	The WB		
Tarzan	Adventure	2003	The WB	Laura Ziskin Productions and David Gerber Productions	
Run of the House	Sitcom	2003–2004	The WB	The Tannenbaum Company and 2 Out Rally Productions	
Like Family	Sitcom	2003–2004	The WB	The Littlefield Company, 3 Hounds Productions and MHS Productions	
All About the Andersons	Sitcom	2003–2004	The WB		
The Mullets	Sitcom	2003–2004	UPN	Bill Oakley/Josh Weinstein Productions and The Tannenbaum Company	
I'm with Her	Sitcom	2003–2004	ABC	Tollin/Robbins Productions and Pennette & Henchy Productions	
Rock Me Baby	Sitcom	2003–2004	UPN	Flame Television	
Eve	Sitcom	2003–2006	UPN	The Greenblatt/Janollari Studio and Mega Diva Inc. (2004–2006)	
The O.C.	Teen drama	2003–2007	Fox	College Hill Pictures, Inc., Hypnotic (season 1) and Wonderland Sound and Vision	
All of Us	Sitcom	2003–2007	UPN/The CW	Overbrook Entertainment	
Nip/Tuck	Medical drama	2003–2010	FX	Hands Down Entertainment, Ryan Murphy Productions, Stu Segall Productions and The Shephard/Robin Company	
Cold Case	Crime drama	2003–2010	CBS	Jerry Bruckheimer Television and CBS Productions (2003–2006); CBS Paramount Network Television (2006–2009); CBS Television Studios (2009–2010)	Distributed in the U.S. by Warner Bros. Domestic Television Distribution & distributed internationally by Paramount Global Distribution Group
The Ellen DeGeneres Show	Talk show	2003–2022	Syndication	A Very Good Production and Telepictures	
One Tree Hill	Teen drama	2003–2012	The WB/The CW	Mastermind Laboratories (2008–2012) and Tollin/Robbins Productions	
Two and a Half Men	Sitcom	2003–2015	CBS	Chuck Lorre Productions and The Tannenbaum Company	
The Help	Sitcom	2004	The WB	Original Productions	
The D.A.	Legal drama	2004	ABC	The Shepard/Robin Company	
Come to Papa	Sitcom	2004	NBC	Stan Allen Productions and NBC Studios	
Next Action Star	Reality	2004	NBC	Silver Pictures Television, NBC Studios, Brass Ring Productions and GRB Entertainment	
The Stones	Sitcom	2004	CBS	KoMut Entertainment	
Dr. Vegas	Drama	2004	CBS	Bender Brown Productions	
Salem's Lot	Miniseries	2004	TNT	The Wolper Organization and Coote/Hayes Productions	
Jack & Bobby	Drama	2004–2005	The WB	Shoe Money Productions and Berlanti-Liddell Productions	
The Real Gilligan's Island	Reality	2004–2005	TBS		
The Mountain	Drama	2004–2005	The WB	Shaun Cassidy Productions and Wonderland Sound and Vision	
Center of the Universe	Sitcom	2004–2005	CBS	Katlin/Bernstein Productions, The Tannenbaum Company and CBS Productions	
Blue Collar TV	Sketch comedy	2004–2006	The WB	Bahr/Small Productions, Parallel Entertainment & Riverside Productions, Inc.	Distribution only
Joey	Sitcom	2004–2006	NBC	Bright-San Productions and Silver & Gold Productions	
Veronica Mars	Drama	2004–2019	UPN/The CW/Hulu	Stu Segall Productions, Silver Pictures Television (seasons 1–3), Rob Thomas Productions (seasons 1–3) and Spondoodle Productions (season 4)	
Unscripted	Comedy drama	2005	HBO	HBO Entertainment and Section Eight Productions	
Eyes	Crime drama	2005	ABC	McNamara Paper Products	
Hot Properties	Sitcom	2005	ABC	SamJen Productions	
Reunion	Drama	2005	Fox	Class IV Productions and Oh That Gus!, Inc.	
Jonny Zero	Action	2005	Fox	John Wells Productions	
Twins	Sitcom	2005–2006	The WB	KoMut Entertainment	
Just Legal	Legal drama	2005–2006	The WB	Jerry Bruckheimer Television	
Related	Comedy drama	2005–2006	The WB	More Horses Productions and Class IV Productions	
E-Ring	Military drama	2005–2006	NBC	Jerry Bruckheimer Television	
Freddie	Sitcom	2005–2006	ABC	Mohawk Productions, Hunga Rican and Excitable Boy!	
Invasion	Science fiction	2005–2006	ABC	Shaun Cassidy Productions	
The War at Home	Sitcom	2005–2007	Fox	Acme Productions and Rob Lotterstein Productions	
Close to Home	Crime drama	2005–2007	CBS	Jerry Bruckheimer Television	
The Comeback	Sitcom	2005–2026	HBO	HBO Entertainment, Always, Valerie Cherish (season 3), Rialto Films (season 3), Is or Isn't Entertainment (seasons 1–2), Michael Patrick King Productions (seasons 2–3) and Working Class Films	
The Closer	Crime drama	2005–2012	TNT	The Shephard/Robin Company and Walking Entropy	
Supernatural	Action	2005–2020	The WB/The CW	Kripke Enterprises and Wonderland Sound and Vision	
Four Kings	Sitcom	2006	NBC	KoMut Entertainment	
Twenty Good Years	Sitcom	2006	NBC	Marsh McCall Productions and Werner/Gold/Miller Productions	
Modern Men	Sitcom	2006	The WB	Marsh McCall Productions and Jerry Bruckheimer Television	
The Bedford Diaries	Drama	2006	The WB	HBO Independent Productions, The Levinson/Fontana Company and Mother Trucker Television Productions Ltd.	
The Evidence	Crime drama	2006	ABC	John Wells Productions	
Justice	Legal drama	2006	Fox	Jerry Bruckheimer Television	
Happy Hour	Sitcom	2006	Fox	Double Double Bonus Entertainment and Werner/Gold/Miller Productions	
Smith	Drama	2006	CBS	John Wells Productions	
Men in Trees	Comedy drama	2006–2008	ABC	Tree Line Films (season 1) and Perkins Street Productions	
The New Adventures of Old Christine	Sitcom	2006–2010	CBS	Kari's Logo Here	
The Class	Sitcom	2006–2007	CBS	CraneKlarik	
Studio 60 on the Sunset Strip	Comedy drama	2006–2007	NBC	Shoe Money Productions	
The Nine	Serial	2006–2007	ABC	Sunset Road Productions	
Traveler	Drama	2007	ABC	The Jinks/Cohen Company	
Moonlight	Paranormal romance	2007–2008	CBS	Silver Pictures Television	
Big Shots	Comedy drama	2007–2008	ABC	Oh That Gus!, Inc.	
Aliens in America	Sitcom	2007–2008	The CW	CBS Paramount Network Television, Mr. Bigshot Fancy-Pants Productions and Guarascio/Port Productions	
Notes from the Underbelly	Sitcom	2007–2008	ABC	The Tannenbaum Company and Hill Three Productions	
Pushing Daisies	Comedy drama	2007–2009	ABC	The Jinks/Cohen Company and Living Dead Guy Productions	
Chuck	Action	2007–2012	NBC	College Hill Pictures, Inc. (2007–2010); (Seasons 1–3), Fake Empire (2010–2012); (Seasons 4–5) and Wonderland Sound and Vision	
Gossip Girl	Teen drama	2007–2012	The CW	College Hill Pictures, Inc. (seasons 1–3), Fake Empire, Alloy Entertainment and CBS Television Studios	
The Big Bang Theory	Sitcom	2007–2019	CBS	Chuck Lorre Productions	
Eleventh Hour	Police procedural	2008–2009	CBS	Jerry Bruckheimer Television and Granada America	Based on Eleventh Hour by Granada Television
Privileged	Comedy drama	2008–2009	The CW	Tsiporah and Alloy Entertainment	
Terminator: The Sarah Connor Chronicles	Action	2008–2009	Fox	Sarah Connor Pictures, Bartleby Company, C2 Pictures (season 1) and The Halcyon Company (season 2)	
Fringe	Science fiction	2008–2013	Fox	Bad Robot	
The Mentalist	Police procedural	2008–2015	CBS	Primrose Hill Productions	
The Life & Times of Tim	Animated sitcom	2008–2012	HBO	HBO Entertainment, Media Rights Capital and Insane Loon Productions	Rights held by Media Rights Capital
Childrens Hospital	Sitcom	2008–2016	TheWB.com/Adult Swim	The Corddry Company, Abominable Pictures, Warner Bros. Studio 2.0 and Williams Street	
The Beautiful Life	Teen drama	2009	The CW	Katalyst Films, CBS Productions, Mike Kelley Productions and The Page Fright Company	
Hank	Sitcom	2009	ABC/Sistema Brasileiro de Televisão	McMonkey Productions, Grammnet Productions, Werner Entertainment and Bonanza Productions	
The Forgotten	Crime drama	2009–2010	ABC	Jerry Bruckheimer Television and Bonanza Productions	
Eastwick	Comedy drama	2009–2010	ABC	Curly Girly Productions	
V	Science fiction	2009–2011	ABC	The Scott Peters Company and HDFilms	
Southland	Crime drama	2009–2013	NBC/TNT	John Wells Productions	
The Middle	Sitcom	2009–2018	ABC	Blackie and Blondie Productions	
The Vampire Diaries	Drama	2009–2017	The CW	Outerbanks Entertainment, Alloy Entertainment, CBS Television Studios and Bonanza Productions	
Past Life	Police procedural	2010	Fox	Hudgins Productions, Pitt Group and Bonanza Productions	
Miami Medical	Medical drama	2010	CBS	Jerry Bruckheimer Television, Skim Milk Productions and Bonanza Productions	
Romantically Challenged	Sitcom	2010	ABC	Candy Bar Productions and Bonanza Productions	
Undercovers	Action	2010	NBC	Bad Robot, Good Butter Productions and Bonanza Productions	
The Whole Truth	Drama	2010	ABC	Jerry Bruckheimer Television and Bonanza Productions	
Human Target	Action	2010–2011	Fox	Wonderland Sound and Vision, Bonanza Productions and DC Comics	
Life Unexpected	Teen drama	2010–2011	The CW	CBS Productions and Best Day Ever Productions and Mojo Films	
Hellcats	Comedy drama	2010–2011	The CW	Five & Dime Productions, Bonanza Productions and CBS Television Studios	
Chase	Police procedural	2010–2011	NBC	Jerry Bruckheimer Television and Bonanza Productions	
Better with You	Sitcom	2010–2011	ABC	Silver & Gold Productions and Bonanza Productions	
$#*! My Dad Says	Sitcom	2010–2011	CBS	KoMut Entertainment and Bonanza Productions	
Nikita	Drama	2010–2013	The CW	Wonderland Sound and Vision, Nikita Films and Sesfonstein Productions	Based on the 1990 film by Luc Besson
Mike & Molly	Sitcom	2010–2016	CBS	Chuck Lorre Productions and Bonanza Productions	
Shameless	Comedy drama	2011–2021	Showtime	John Wells Productions and Bonanza Productions	Based on the British series of the same name by Paul Abbott
The Paul Reiser Show	Sitcom	2011	NBC	Nuance Productions	
Harry's Law	Legal drama	2011–2012	NBC	David E. Kelley Productions and Bonanza Productions	
Ringer	Thriller	2011–2012	The CW	Green Eggs and Pam Productions, Inc., Brillstein Entertainment Partners, ABC Studios, CBS Television Studios (pilot) and CBS Productions (episodes 2–22)	
The Secret Circle	Supernatural	2011–2012	The CW	Outerbanks Entertainment, Alloy Entertainment, CBS Television Studios and Bonanza Productions	
I Hate My Teenage Daughter	Sitcom	2011–2012	Fox	Gavin&Roxie&Hap Productions and Bonanza Productions	
2 Broke Girls	Sitcom	2011–2017	CBS	Michael Patrick King Productions and Bonanza Productions	
Person of Interest	Crime drama	2011–2016	CBS	Bad Robot, Kilter Films and Bonanza Productions	
Hart of Dixie	Comedy drama	2011–2015	The CW	Fake Empire, Dogarooski, CBS Television Studios and Bonanza Productions	
Suburgatory	Sitcom	2011–2014	ABC	Piece of Pie Productions	
Are You There, Chelsea?	Sitcom	2012	NBC	Borderline Amazing Productions, Werner Entertainment, 4 to 6 Foot Productions and Bonanza Productions	
Alcatraz	Science fiction	2012	Fox	Bad Robot and Bonanza Productions	
Coma	Medical thriller	2012	A&E	Turner Entertainment Co., Sony Pictures Television and Scott Free Productions	Based on Coma by Robin Cook and the 1978 film of the same name by Metro Goldwyn Mayer
Partners	Sitcom	2012	CBS	KoMut Entertainment	
Major Crimes	Crime drama	2012–2018	TNT	The Shephard/Robin Company and Walking Entropy	
Arrow	Superhero	2012–2020	The CW	Bonanza Productions, Berlanti Productions and DC Comics	
Revolution	Action	2012–2014	NBC	Bad Robot, Kripke Enterprises and Bonanza Productions	
Work It	Sitcom	2012–2013	ABC/TV2/MTV3	Summer School Productions and Bonanza Productions	
666 Park Avenue	Supernatural	2012–2013	ABC	Alloy Entertainment and Bonanza Productions	
Emily Owens, M.D.	Medical drama	2012–2013	The CW	CBS Television Studios and The Dan Jinks Company	
Cult	Mystery	2013	The CW	Fake Empire, CBS Television Studios & Rockne S. O’Bannon Television	
Golden Boy	Crime drama	2013	CBS	Berlanti Productions, Nicholas Wootton Productions & Bonanza Productions	
The Carrie Diaries	Teen drama	2013–2014	The CW	Fake Empire and A.B. Baby Productions	
Hostages	Drama	2013–2014	CBS	Jerry Bruckheimer Television and Nana.10.Co.il	Based on Bnei Aruba by Nana.10.Co
Super Fun Night	Sitcom	2013–2014	ABC	Conaco and Bonanza Productions	
The Tomorrow People	Science fiction	2013–2014	The CW	FremantleMedia North America, CBS Television Studios, Berlanti/Plec and Bonanza Productions	Based on The Tomorrow People by Thames Television
Almost Human	Science fiction	2013–2014	Fox	Frequency Films, Bad Robot and Bonanza Productions	
Newsreaders	Comedy	2013–2015	Adult Swim	The Corddry Company, Abominable Pictures, Warner Bros. Studio 2.0 and Williams Street	
The Following	Psychological thriller	2013–2015	Fox	Outerbanks Entertainment and Bonanza Productions	
Mom	Sitcom	2013–2021	CBS	Chuck Lorre Productions	
The Originals	Horror	2013–2018	The CW	My So-Called Company, Alloy Entertainment, CBS Television Studios and Bonanza Productions	
Reign	Historical drama	2013–2017	The CW	Joyful Girl Productions, Take 5 Productions, Whizbang Films and CBS Television Studios	
Believe	Fantasy	2014	NBC	Bad Robot, Esperanto Filmoj and Bonanza Productions	
Star-Crossed	Science fiction	2014	The CW	Space Floor Television, Olé Productions and CBS Television Studios	
Surviving Jack	Comedy	2014	Fox/TVNZ 2	Doozer	
Selfie	Sitcom	2014	ABC/Hulu	Piece of Pie Productions	Modern adaptation of My Fair Lady
Undateable	Sitcom	2014–2016	NBC	Doozer	
Candidly Nicole	Reality	2014–2015	VH1	World of Wonder, Telepictures and Honey Child Productions	
The Mysteries of Laura	Police procedural	2014–2016	NBC	Berlanti Productions, Kapital Entertainment, New Media Vision and Jeff Rake Productions	Based on Los Misterios de Laura by RTVE
Forever	Fantasy	2014–2015	ABC	Good Session Productions and Lin Pictures	
Stalker	Crime drama	2014–2015	CBS	Outerbanks Entertainment	
A to Z	Sitcom	2014–2015	NBC	BQ Productions and Le Train Train	
Constantine	Drama	2014–2015	NBC	DC Comics, Ever After Productions, Phantom Four Films and Bonanza Productions	
Gotham	Crime drama	2014–2019	Fox	Primrose Hill Productions and DC Comics	
The 100	Action	2014–2020	The CW	Alloy Entertainment, Bonanza Productions and CBS Television Studios	
The Flash	Superhero	2014–2023	The CW	Bonanza Productions, Berlanti Productions and DC Entertainment	
Jane the Virgin	Comedy drama	2014–2019	The CW	Poppy Productions, RCTV International, Electus and CBS Television Studios	Based on Juana la Virgen by RCTV
The Leftovers	Drama	2014–2017	HBO	HBO Entertainment, White Rabbit and Film 44	
iZombie	Comedy drama	2015–2019	The CW	Spondoolie Productions, Bonanza Productions, DC Comics and Vertigo	
Blindspot	Crime drama	2015–2020	NBC	Berlanti Productions and Quinn's House	
Crazy Ex-Girlfriend	Romantic comedy	2015–2019	The CW	LeanMachine, Webbterfuge and CBS Television Studios	
Supergirl	Superhero	2015–2021	CBS/The CW	Berlanti Productions and DC Comics	
Significant Mother	Sitcom	2015	The CW	Alloy Entertainment and CBS Television Studios	
The Messengers	Supernatural	2015	The CW	Thunder Road Television and CBS Television Studios	
One Big Happy	Sitcom	2015	NBC	Visualized, Inc. and A Very Good Production	
Legends of Tomorrow	Superhero	2016–2022	The CW	Berlanti Productions, DC Comics and Bonanza Productions	
Lucifer	Occult detective fiction	2016–2021	Fox/Netflix	Jerry Bruckheimer Television and DC Comics	
Animal Kingdom	Crime drama	2016–2022	TNT	John Wells Productions	Continued from Warner Horizon Television
Queen Sugar	Drama	2016–2022	OWN	Array Filmworks and Harpo Films	Continued from Warner Horizon Television
Westworld	Science fiction	2016–2022	HBO	HBO Entertainment, Jerry Weintraub Productions (season 1), Bad Robot and Kilter Films	Based on the 1973 film by Metro-Goldwyn-Mayer
Lethal Weapon	Comedy drama	2016–2019	Fox	Lin Pictures and Good Session Productions	Based on the 1987 film and its sequels by Warner Bros. Pictures
Containment	Drama	2016	The CW	Eyeworks and My So-Called Company	
11.22.63	Drama	2016	Hulu	Carpenter B. and Bad Robot	
Rush Hour	Police procedural	2016	CBS	Doozer, RatPac Television and New Line Cinema	Based on the 1998 film by New Line Cinema
Frequency	Drama	2016–2017	The CW	Jeremy Carver Productions, Lin Pictures and New Line Cinema	Based on the 2000 film by New Line Cinema
Roadies	Comedy drama	2016	Showtime	Bad Robot, Vinyl Films and Showtime Networks	
No Tomorrow	Comic science-fiction	2016–2017	The CW	Grupo Globo, Electus and CBS Television Studios	Based on Como Aproveitar o Fim do Mundo by Estúdios Globo
Time After Time	Drama	2017	ABC	Outerbanks Entertainment	
Powerless	Sitcom	2017	NBC	Ehsugadee Productions and DC Comics	
Training Day	Crime	2017	CBS	Jerry Bruckheimer Television	Based on the 2001 film by Warner Bros. Pictures
Me, Myself & I	Sitcom	2017–2018	CBS	Kapital Entertainment and Melon Entertainment	
Disjointed	Sitcom	2017–2018	Netflix	Chuck Lorre Productions	
Trial & Error	Mockumentary/Surreal comedy	2017–2018	NBC	Other Shoe Productions and Good Session Productions	
Riverdale	Teen drama	2017–2023	The CW	Berlanti Productions, CBS Studios and Archie Comics	
Claws	Comedy drama	2017–2022	TNT	Le Train Train and Studio T (seasons 1–2)	Continued from Warner Horizon Television
Young Sheldon	Sitcom	2017–2024	CBS	Chuck Lorre Productions	
Valor	Military drama	2017–2018	The CW	Ostar Productions and CBS Television Studios	
Black Lightning	Superhero	2018–2021	The CW	Berlanti Productions, Akil Productions and DC Comics	
Life Sentence	Drama	2018	The CW	In Good Company, Doozer and CBS Television Studios	
Deception	Crime drama	2018	ABC	Berlanti Productions and VHPT Company	
Living Biblically	Sitcom	2018	CBS	Enrico Pallazzo Productions and Alcide Bava Productions	
Splitting Up Together	Sitcom	2018–2019	ABC	A Very Good Production and Piece of Pie Productions	
Castle Rock	Mystery	2018–2019	Hulu	Bad Robot, Old Curiosity Shop and Darkbloom Productions (season 1)	
You	Psychological thriller	2018–2025	Lifetime/Netflix	Berlanti Productions, Man Sewing Dinosaur, Alloy Entertainment and A+E Studios	Continued from Warner Horizon Television
Manifest	Drama/Supernatural	2018–2023	NBC/Netflix	Universal Television (seasons 1–3), Compari Entertainment and Jeff Rake Productions	
God Friended Me	Fantasy	2018–2020	CBS	Berlanti Productions, I Have an Idea! Entertainment and CBS Television Studios	
Chilling Adventures of Sabrina	Horror	2018–2020	Netflix	Berlanti Productions, Muckle Man Productions (season 2) and Archie Comics	
All American	Sports drama	2018–2026	The CW	Berlanti Productions, April Blair's Company (season 1) and CBS Studios	
Titans	Superhero	2018–2023	DC Universe/HBO Max	Berlanti Productions, Weed Road Pictures (seasons 1–2) and DC Entertainment	
Legacies	Drama	2018–2022	The CW	My So-Called Company, Alloy Entertainment and CBS Studios	
The Kominsky Method	Sitcom	2018–2021	Netflix	Chuck Lorre Productions	
Roswell, New Mexico	Drama	2019–2022	The CW	Amblin Television, My So Called Company, Bender Brown Productions and CBS Studios	
Doom Patrol	Superhero	2019–2023	DC Universe/HBO Max	Berlanti Productions, Jeremy Carver Productions and DC Entertainment	
Whiskey Cavalier	Comedy drama	2019	ABC	Hemingson Entertainment and Doozer	
In the Dark	Crime drama	2019–2022	The CW	Red Hour Productions and CBS Studios	
The Red Line	Drama	2019	CBS	Forward Movement, Berlanti Productions, Array Flimworks and CBS Television Studios	
Special	Comedy	2019–2021	Netflix	Stage 13, That's Wonderful Productions and Campfire	
It's Bruno!	Comedy	2019	Netflix	Stage 13, SLI Entertainment and Phiphen Pictures	
What/If	Thriller	2019	Netflix	Page Fright, Atlas Entertainment and Compari Entertainment	
Swamp Thing	Superhero	2019	DC Universe	Big Shoe Productions, Atomic Monster and DC Entertainment	
Pennyworth	Action	2019–2022	Epix/HBO Max	Primrose Hill Productions and DC Entertainment	Also known as Pennyworth: The Origin of Batman's Butler for season 3; Continued from Warner Horizon Television; A prequel to Gotham and the DC Vertigo graphic novel V for Vendetta; Based on the DC Comics character Alfred Pennyworth by Bill Finger & Jerry Robinson
All Rise	Legal drama	2019–2023	CBS/OWN	CBS Studios (seasons 1–2), Harpo Films (season 3-) Shimmering Pictures (seasons 1–2), Skyemac Productions and Tall Baby Productions	
David Makes Man	Coming-of-age	2019–2021	OWN	Page Fright, Outlier Society Productions and Harpo Films	Continued from Warner Horizon Television
Bob Hearts Abishola	Sitcom	2019–2024	CBS	Chuck Lorre Productions	
Prodigal Son	Crime drama	2019–2021	Fox	Berlanti Productions, Sklaverwork Productions, VHPT Company and Fox Entertainment	
Batwoman	Superhero	2019–2022	The CW	Berlanti Productions and DC Entertainment	
Watchmen	Superhero	2019	HBO	HBO Entertainment, White Rabbit, Paramount Television and DC Entertainment	A television series sequel to the DC Comics comic limited series by Alan Moore and Dave Gibbons
Dolly Parton's Heartstrings	Anthology	2019	Netflix	Dixie Pixie Productions, Sandollar Productions and Magnolia Hill Entertainment	
AJ and the Queen	Comedy drama	2020	Netflix	MPK Productions and RuCo	
Katy Keene	Comedy drama	2020	The CW	Berlanti Productions, Archie Comics and CBS Studios	A spin-off to Riverdale; Based on the Archie Comics character of the same name by Katy Keene and Bill Woggon
Cherish the Day	Romantic drama	2020–2022	OWN	Harpo Films and ARRAY Filmworks	Continued from Warner Horizon Television
100 Humans	Reality-TV	2020	Netflix	Shed Media, BlazHoffski and Rob & Joep Productions	
Self Made: Inspired by the Life of Madam C.J. Walker	Drama	2020	Netflix	SpringHill Entertainment, Orit Entertainment and Wonder Street	
Stargirl	Superhero	2020–2022	DC Universe/The CW	Berlanti Productions, Mad Ghost Productions and DC Entertainment	
I May Destroy You	Drama	2020	BBC One; HBO	FALKNA Productions, Various Artists Limited and BBC Studios	
Little Voice	Romantic comedy	2020	Apple TV+	Dear Hope Productions and Bad Robot	
The Fugitive	Action thriller	2020	Quibi	Blackjack Films, Thunder Road Pictures and 3 Arts Entertainment	
Ted Lasso	Comedy drama	2020–present	Apple TV+	Ruby's Tuna, Doozer and Universal Television	
Lovecraft Country	Period drama	2020	HBO	HBO Entertainment, Afemme, Monkeypaw Productions and Bad Robot	
B Positive	Sitcom	2020–2022	CBS	Chuck Lorre Productions	
The Flight Attendant	Thriller	2020–2022	HBO Max	Yes, Norman Productions and Berlanti Productions	
The Right Stuff	Historical drama	2020	Disney+	National Geographic Studios and Appian Way Productions	
Call Me Kat	Sitcom	2021–2023	Fox	Farm Kid, Sad Clown Productions, That's Wonderful Productions, Fox Entertainment, and BBC Studios	Based on Miranda by BBC Studios
Superman & Lois	Superhero drama	2021–2024	The CW	Berlanti Productions and DC Entertainment	
United States of Al	Sitcom	2021–2022	CBS	Chuck Lorre Productions	
Kung Fu	Martial arts action	2021–2023	The CW	Berlanti Productions, Quinn's House (seasons 1–2) and Kinga Productions (season 3)	
Sweet Tooth	Fantasy drama	2021–2024	Netflix	Nightshade, Team Downey and DC Entertainment	
Lisey's Story	Drama	2021	Apple TV+	60/40 Productions and Bad Robot	
The Republic of Sarah	Drama	2021	The CW	Black Lamb, Fulwell 73 Productions and CBS Studios	
Os Exterminadores do Além: A série	Comedy	2021	SBT	Clube Filmes	Produced by Warner Bros. Television; Based on 2018 film produced by Warner Bros. and Clube Filmes
Gossip Girl	Teen drama	2021–2023	HBO Max	Random Acts Productions, Fake Empire, Alloy Entertainment and CBS Studios	A standalone sequel to the original series of the same name; Based on the novel series by Cecily von Ziegesar
Maid	Drama	2021	Netflix	John Wells Productions and LuckyChap Entertainment	
Blade Runner: Black Lotus	Anime	2021	Adult Swim (Toonami)	Crunchyroll and Williams Street	Licensed by Warner Bros. TV Studios and Sony Pictures Television (International)
Head of the Class	Sitcom	2021	HBO Max	Doozer	Revival of the 1986–1991 series by Michael Elias and Richard Eustis
The Sex Lives of College Girls	Comedy drama	2021–2025	HBO Max	Kaling International and 3 Arts Entertainment	
Abbott Elementary	Mockumentary	2021–present	ABC	Delicious Non-Sequitur Productions, Fifth Chance (season 2–) and 20th Television	
The Cleaning Lady	Crime drama	2022–2025	Fox	ShadowDance Pictures, Amore & Vita Productions, Inc. (seasons 1–2), Laughing Monkeys (seasons 1–2) and Fox Entertainment	Based on the Argentine series La Chica Que Limpa
Pivoting	Comedy	2022	Fox	Mama Look! Productions, Kapital Entertainment and Fox Entertainment	
Naomi	Superhero	2022	The CW	Array Filmworks and DC Entertainment	
The Kings of Napa	Drama	2022	OWN	Harpo Films and Folding Chair Productions	
Peacemaker	Superhero action/Black comedy	2022–2025	HBO Max	DC Studios, The Safran Company, and Troll Court Entertainment	
All American: Homecoming	Sports drama	2022–2024	The CW	CBS Studios, Berlanti Productions and Rock My Soul Productions	
Shining Vale	Comedy horror	2022–2023	Starz	Lionsgate Television, Kapital Entertainment, Other Shoe Productions and Merman	
DMZ	Dystopian alternate history drama	2022	HBO Max	ARRAY Filmworks, Analog and DC Entertainment	
The Time Traveler's Wife	Science fiction romantic drama	2022	HBO	HBO Entertainment, New Line Cinema and Hartswood Films	
Keep Breathing	Survival drama	2022	Netflix	Wide Awake Productions and Quinn's House	
Pretty Little Liars: Original Sin	Slasher teen mystery thriller	2022–2024	HBO Max	Muckle Man Productions and Alloy Entertainment	
The Sandman	Fantasy drama	2022–2025	Netflix	DC Entertainment, PurePop Inc., The Blank Corporation and Phantom Four Films	
East New York	Police procedural	2022–2023	CBS	Clothesline Productions, Grounded Mind, Skyemac Productions and Wonder Street Entertainment	
The Winchesters	Supernatural drama	2022–2023	The CW	CBS Studios, Here There, Chaos Machine Productions and Wonderland Sound and Vision	Prequel of Supernatural
The Peripheral	Science fiction thriller drama	2022	Amazon Prime Video	Kilter Films, Copperheart Entertainment and Amazon Studios	
Night Court	Sitcom	2023–2025	NBC	After January Productions, Secret Bird and Universal Television	Revival of the 1984–1992 series
Shrinking	Comedy	2023–present	Apple TV+	3 Chance Productions, Corporate Mandate and Doozer Productions	
Gotham Knights	Action crime drama superhero	2023	The CW	Berlanti Productions and DC Entertainment	
Mrs. Davis	Science fiction drama	2023	Peacock	White Rabbit Productions and Little Bug	
Casa Grande	Family drama	2023	Amazon Freevee	ESX Entertainment	
Found	Drama	2023–2025	NBC	Berlanti Productions, Rock My Soul Productions and Universal Television	Originally ordered at ABC
Bookie	Comedy	2023–2025	HBO Max	Chuck Lorre Productions	Originally titled 'How to Be a Bookie'
The Girls on the Bus	Political drama	2024	HBO Max	Berlanti Productions and Tsiporah	Originally ordered by Netflix and later developed at The CW
Dead Boy Detectives	Supernatural comedy-drama	2024	Netflix	DC Entertainment, Berlanti Productions and Ghost Octopus	Originally in development at Max
The Big Cigar	Drama	2024	Apple TV+	Epic, Jim Hecht Productions and Folding Chair Productions	6-episode series
How Music Got Free	Music	2024	Paramount+	Telepictures, MTV Entertainment Studios, SpringHill Company, Interscope Films and Shady Films	
Presumed Innocent	Legal drama	2024–present	Apple TV+	Bad Robot, Nine Stories Productions, Old Curiosity Shop Productions and David E. Kelley Productions	
The Emperor of Ocean Park	Thriller	2024	MGM+	John Wells Productions	
Bad Monkey	Crime comedy	2024–present	Apple TV+	Doozer Productions	
The Penguin	Crime drama gangster miniseries	2024	HBO	DC Studios, Acid and Tender Productions, 6th & Idaho Motion Picture Company, Dylan Clark Productions, Chapel Place Productions and Zobot Projects	Originally ordered at Max
Rescue: HI-Surf	Drama	2024–2025	Fox	John Wells Productions and Fox Entertainment	
Brilliant Minds	Medical drama	2024–2026	NBC	Berlanti Productions, 1107 Productions, 72nd Street Fabel Entertainment, The Imaginarium and Universal Television	Originally ordered at Fox
Georgie & Mandy's First Marriage	Sitcom	2024–present	CBS	Chuck Lorre Productions	A direct sequel to Young Sheldon
The Pitt	Medical drama	2025–present	HBO Max	John Wells Productions and R. Scott Gemmill Productions	
Running Point	Sports Comedy	2025–present	Netflix	Kaling International, 23/34 Productions and 3 Arts Entertainment	
Duster	Crime Thriller	2025	HBO Max	Bad Robot and TinkerToy Productions	
Untamed	Murder Mystery	2025–present	Netflix	John Wells Productions, Escape Artists and Bee Holder Productions	
Leanne	Sitcom	2025–present	Netflix	Chuck Lorre Productions	
It: Welcome to Derry	Coming-of-age supernatural horror	2025–present	HBO	Rideback, Vertigo Entertainment, FiveTen Productions, K Plus Ultra and Double Dream	A prequel to the 2017 film It and its 2019 sequel It Chapter Two; Based on the novel It by Stephen King
Not Suitable for Work	Comedy	2026	Hulu	Kaling International, Charlie Grandy Productions, Inc. and 3 Arts Entertainment	
Memory of a Killer	Crime drama	2026–present	Fox	Welle Entertainment, Eyeworks and Fox Entertainment	
Rooster	Comedy	2026–present	HBO	Doozer Productions and Two Soups Productions	
Stuart Fails to Save the Universe	Sitcom	2026–present	HBO Max	Chuck Lorre Productions	Second spin-off to The Big Bang Theory
Lanterns	Superhero science fiction	2026–present	HBO	DC Studios and Man, Woman & Child Productions	Based on the DC Green Lantern characters Hal Jordan and John Stewart from DC
Unaccustomed Earth	Romantic drama	December 17, 2026	Netflix	John Wells Productions	
Harry Potter	Fantasy drama	December 25, 2026	HBO	Heyday Films and Brontë Film and Television	A television adaptation of the J.K. Rowling's eponymous fantasy books series Harry Potter.
Anna O	Crime thriller	TBA	Netflix	Berlanti Productions	
The People v. Gorilla Grood	Mockumentary	TBA	HBO Max	DC Studios and Woodhead Entertainment	
Escorted	Romantic Comedy	TBA	Amazon Prime Video	Amazon MGM Studios	
Just Cause		TBA	Amazon Prime Video	These Pictures	Based on the novel by John Katzenbach
Untitled Buster Keaton limited series		TBA	TBA	6th & Idaho Productions	
Doll		TBA	NBC		
Anon Pls	Drama	TBA	HBO Max	Berlanti Productions	
Cleopatra and Frankenstein		TBA	HBO Max		
The Hotel Nantucket		TBA	HBO Max		
The Probability of Miracles	Drama	TBA	HBO Max	Alloy Entertainment	
More	Drama	TBA	HBO Max	Berlanti Productions	
Waller	Superhero	TBA	HBO Max	DC Studios	
Paradise Lost	Superhero	TBA	HBO Max	DC Studios	
Booster Gold	Superhero	TBA	HBO Max	DC Studios	
300		TBA	TBA		
Foster Friends		TBA	CBS	Alloy Entertainment	
A Few Good Men	Drama	TBA	NBC	Sony Pictures Television and Universal Television	
Foster Dade		TBA	TBA	Berlanti Productions and De Line Pictures	
Kansas City Star	Comedy	TBA	HBO Max	Yes, Norman Productions	
Pure	Drama	TBA	Peacock	Weimaraner Republic Pictures	Based on Allen Salkin's Vanity Fair article "The Runaway Vegan".
Expecting		TBA	Peacock	Kaling International and 3 Arts Entertainment	
Untitled Aqualad series	Young Adult	TBA	HBO Max	Denver & Delilah Films	Based on the 2020 YA graphic novel, You Brought Me the Ocean.
Pride		TBA	HBO	Alloy Entertainment	
Speed Racer		TBA	Apple TV+	Bad Robot	
Stillwater	Horror	TBA	TBA	Berlanti Productions and Skybound Entertainment	
Untitled Justin Noble/Prime Video Project	Crime drama	TBA	Amazon Prime Video	Brownstone Productions and David E. Kelley Productions	
Untitled Sherlock Holmes spin-off	Mystery	TBA	HBO Max	Team Downey	
Untitled Sherlock Holmes spin-off (2)	Mystery	TBA	HBO Max	Team Downey	
Scooby-Doo: Origins		TBA	Netflix	Berlanti Productions	
Untitled Sarah Chalke/Bill Lawrence project		TBA	TBA	Doozer Productions	
Untitled The Conjuring Series	Supernatural horror	TBA	HBO Max	Atomic Monster and The Safran Company	
Afterlife with Archie	Drama	TBA	Disney+	Berlanti Productions, Muckle Man Productions and Archie Comics	
American Blue	Drama	TBA	HBO Max	Berlanti Productions	
How to Survive Without Me	Family Drama	TBA	HBO Max	Berlanti Productions and Yes, Norman Productions	
Modern Austen	Drama	TBA	The CW	DIGM Entertainment and Homegrown Pictures	
Regency	Historic Comedy	TBA	CBS		
Rust Belt News	Comedy	TBA	CBS	Alloy Entertainment	
Skinny Dip	Crime comedy	TBA	Amazon Prime Video	Doozer Productions	
V for Vendetta	Drama	TBA	HBO	DC Studios, Wall to Wall Media and Poison Pen	
Zarna	Comedy	TBA	CBS	Kaling International, Hartbeat Productions and 3 Arts Entertainment	
Crazy Rich Asians	Romantic comedy drama	TBA	HBO	Color Force and SK Global Entertainment	
Karen Read	Drama series	TBA	Amazon Prime Video	Brownstone Productions and David E. Kelley Productions	

===== Blue Ribbon Content =====
Title	Years	Network	Co-production with
Terminator Salvation: The Machinima Series	2009	Machinima	Wonderland Sound and Vision and The Halcyon Company
Mortal Kombat: Legacy	2011–2013	Machinima	Warner Bros. Interactive Entertainment, NetherRealm Studios and Contradiction Films
Justice League: Gods and Monsters Chronicles	2015	Machinima	Warner Bros. Animation and DC Entertainment
Vixen	2015–2016	CW Seed	Warner Bros. Animation and DC Entertainment
Now We're Talking	2016–2018	go90	Uninterrupted
JoJoHead	2016	CW Seed	Unperfect Productions
Ellen's Pet Dish	2017	YouTube	Ellen Digital Ventures
Ginger Snaps	2017	ABCd	Rubber House and BES Animation
Play with Caution	2017	DIXP	
Freedom Fighters: The Ray	2017–2018	CW Seed	Warner Bros. Animation, DC Entertainment and Berlanti Productions
Constantine: City of Demons	2018–2019	CW Seed	Warner Bros. Animation, DC Entertainment, Berlanti Productions and Phantom Four Films
Best Shot	2018	YouTube Premium	SpringHill Entertainment and Boardwalk Pictures
Critters: A New Binge	2019	Shudder	New Line Cinema and Triton Media Holdings
Deathstroke: Knights & Dragons	2020	CW Seed	Warner Bros. Animation, DC Entertainment and Berlanti Productions
Toys of Terror	2020	Syfy	Cartel Pictures

===== Warner Horizon Television =====
The logo for Warner Horizon Television.

Title	Genre	Years	Network	Co-production companies
High School Reunion	Reality television	2003–2010	The WB/TV Land	Next Entertainment
Pussycat Dolls Present	Reality television	2007–2008	The CW	Pussycat LLC and 10 by 10 Entertainment
Online Nation	Reality television	2007	The CW	
CW Now	News program/News magazine	2007–2008	The CW	
Heartland	Medical drama	2007	TNT	David Hollander Productions
Side Order of Life	Drama	2007	Lifetime	The Jinks/Cohen Company
State of Mind	Comedy drama	2007	Lifetime	The Shepard/Robin Company
America's Best Dance Crew	Competitive dance	2008–2015	MTV	MTV Production Development, Tenth Planet Productions, Hip Hop International, Bayonne Entertainment and Dream Merchant Entertainment
Here Come the Newlyweds	Reality television	2008–2009	ABC	The Jay & Tony Show
Stylista	Reality television	2008	The CW	10 by 10 Entertainment, Bankable Productions, Eliz Holzman Productions, Full Picture Entertainment, Development Hell and Magic Molehill Productions
Pussycat Dolls Present: Girlicious	Reality television	2008	The CW	10 by 10 Entertainment, Wonderland Sound and Vision, Interscope Records, Geffen Records and Magic Molehill Productions
True Beauty	Reality television	2009–2010	ABC	Bankable Productions and Katalsyt Films
13: Fear Is Real	Reality television	2009	The CW	Jay Beinstock Productions, Ghost House Pictures and Magic Molehill Productions
Trust Me	Drama	2009	TNT	The Shepard/Robin Company
Hitched or Ditched	Reality television	2009	The CW	
Man vs. Cartoon	Popular science	2009	TruTV	Monkey Kingdom and Pilgrim Film & Television
Dark Blue	Crime drama	2009–2010	TNT	Water Chopping Entertainment
More to Love	Reality television	2009	Fox	
There Goes the Neighborhood	Reality television	2009	CBS	Next Entertainment and Jay Bienstock Productions
Leave It to Lamas	Reality television	2009	E!	
Pretty Little Liars	Crime thriller	2010–2017	ABC Family/Freeform	Alloy Entertainment, Long Lake Productions and Russian Hill Productions
Rubicon	Drama	2010	AMC	HBTV and City Entertainment
Unnatural History	Action	2010	Cartoon Network	Mike Herb Productions
Memphis Beat	Crime drama	2010–2011	TNT	Smokehouse Productions
Rizzoli & Isles	Police procedural	2010–2016	TNT	Ostar Productions and Hurdler Productions
Bachelor Pad	Game show	2010–2012	ABC	Next Entertainment
School Pride	Reality television	2010	NBC	Denise Cramsey Productions
Glory Daze	Comedy drama	2010–2011	TBS	The Walt Becker Company
Shedding for the Wedding	Reality	2011	The CW	
Take the Money and Run	Reality competition	2011	ABC	Jerry Bruckheimer Television and Profiles Television
The Lying Game	Mystery	2011–2013	ABC Family	Alloy Entertainment and Pratt Enterprises
H8R	Reality	2011	The CW	Lisa G Productions and Next Entertainment
Good Vibes	Animated sitcom	2011	MTV	MTV Production Development, MTV Animation, Werner Entertainment, Rough House Pictures, Not the QB Pro. and Six Point Harness
Longmire	Crime drama	2012–2017	A&E/Netflix	The Shephard/Robin Company and Two Boomerangs Productions
Dallas	Drama	2012–2014	TNT	Cyntax Productions
Political Animals	Comedy drama	2012	USA Network	Berlanti Productions and Laurence Mark Productions
The Next: Fame Is at Your Doorstep	Reality television	2012	The CW	Raqual Productions and Flavor Unit Entertainment
Pretty Dirty Secrets	Mystery	2012	ABC Family	Alloy Entertainment, Long Lake Productions and Russian Hill Productions
Sullivan & Son	Sitcom	2012–2014	TBS	Wild West Picture Show Productions
Oh Sit!	Game show	2012–2013	The CW	The Gurin Company, 405 Productions and Raquel Productions Inc.
La Voz Kids	Reality competition	2013–2016	NBC	One Three Media (2013–2014), United Artists Media Group (2014–2015), MGM Television (2016) and Talpa Media
Ravenswood	Teen drama	2013–2014	ABC Family	Alloy Entertainment, Long Lake Productions, Russian Hill Productions and Jarndyce & Jarndyce Inc.
Ground Floor	Sitcom	2013–2015	TBS	Doozer
Copycat	Game show	2014	MTV	Next Entertainment and MTV Production Development
Finding Carter	Teen drama	2014–2015	MTV	The Popfilms Movie Company, Stockton Drive, Inc. (season 2) and MTV Production Development
Repeat After Me	Comedy reality	2015	ABC	A Very Good Production
500 Questions	Game show	2015–2016	ABC	United Artists Media Group (season 1)/MGM Television (season 2)
Clipped	Sitcom	2015	TBS	KoMut Entertainment
Bachelor in Paradise: After Paradise	Talk show	2015–2016	ABC	Next Entertainment and Embassy Row
Fuller House	Sitcom	2016–2020	Netflix	Jeff Franklin Productions and Miller-Boyett Productions
Little Big Shots	Talent show	2016–2020	NBC	East 112th Street Productions, On the Day Productions and A Very Good Production
Ben & Lauren: Happily Ever After?	Reality Television	2016	Freeform	Next Entertainment
People of Earth	Comedy	2016–2018	TBS	Conaco and Deedle-Dee Productions
The Twins: Happily Ever After?	Reality television	2017	Freeform	Next Entertainment
Famous in Love	Drama	2017–2018	Freeform	Long Lake Media, Farah Films and Carmina Productions
Love Connection	Dating game show	2017–2018	Fox	Next Entertainment and Telepictures
The Bachelor Winter Games	Reality competition	2018	ABC	Next Entertainment
Krypton	Action	2018–2019	Syfy	Phantom Four Films and DC Entertainment
American Woman	Comedy	2018	Paramount Network	John Wells Productions
The Proposal	Reality series	2018	ABC	Next Entertainment
Love Is	Comedy drama	2018	Oprah Winfrey Network	Harpo Films and Akil Productions
La Voz	Reality competition	2019–2020	Telemundo	Telemundo Studios, Talpa Media (2019) and ITV America (2020)
The World's Best	Reality	2019	CBS	Fulwell 73 Productions and MGM Television
Pretty Little Liars: The Perfectionists	Crime thriller	2019	Freeform	Alloy Entertainment and Long Lake Productions
Million Dollar Mile	Game show	2019	CBS	Fly on the Wall Entertainment and SpringHill Entertainment
Medical Police	Comedy	2020	Netflix	Abominable Pictures, David Wain Productions, Mister Krister and The Corddry Company
The Bachelor: Listen to Your Heart	Dating game show	2020	ABC	Next Entertainment
The Bachelor: The Greatest Seasons- Ever!	Reality television	2020	ABC	Next Entertainment
Helter Skelter: An American Myth	Miniseries	2020	Epix	Invented By Girls, Rogue Atlas, Berlanti Productions and MGM Television

====== Warner Horizon Unscripted Television ======
Title	Genre	Years	Network	Co-production with
Whose Line Is It Anyway?	Comedy	1998–2007; 2013–present	ABC/ABC Family/The CW	Hat Trick Productions and Angst Productions
The Bachelor	Dating game show	2002–present	ABC	Next Entertainment (2002–2023) and NZK Productions Inc.
The Bachelorette	Dating game show	2003–present	ABC	Next Entertainment (2002–2023) and NZK Productions Inc.
The Voice	Reality competition	2011–present	NBC	Mark Burnett Productions (2011), One Three Media (2012–2014), United Artists Media Group (2014–2015), MGM Television (2016–present), Talpa Media (2011–2019) and ITV America (2020–present)
Bachelor in Paradise	Reality competition	2014–present	ABC	Next Entertainment (2014–2023)
Ellen's Game of Games	Game show	2017–2021	NBC	Telepictures and A Very Good Production
Mental Samurai	Game show	2019–2021	Fox	A. Smith & Co. Productions and Apploff Entertainment
The Bradshaw Bunch	Reality television	2020–2022	E!	Shed Media
Equal	Docuseries	2020	HBO Max	Scout Productions, Berlanti Productions, Raintree Ventures and That's Wonderful Productions
The Masked Dancer	Reality competition	2020–2021	Fox	Fox Alternative Entertainment, MBC and A Very Good Production
Family Game Fight!	Game show	2021–2022	NBC	A Very Good Production, Dingus Von Pringus and Telepictures
Home Sweet Home	Reality	2021	NBC/Peacock	ARRAY Filmworks
Harry Potter: Hogwarts Tournament of Houses	Game show	2021	TBS; Cartoon Network	theoldschool
Finding Magic Mike	Reality	2021	HBO Max	Eureka Productions
True Story with Ed and Randall	Docuseries	2022	Peacock	Universal Television Alternative Studio and Pacific Electric Picture Co.
The Wheel	Game show	2022	NBC	Apploff Entertainment and Hungry Bear Media
100 Years of Warner Bros.	Documentary	2023	Max	Iwerks and Co.
Lotería Loca	Game show	2023	CBS	Apploff Entertainment
Harry Potter: Wizards of Baking	Baking	2024	Food Network	Twenty Twenty Television and theoldschool
Fast Friends	Game show	2024	Max	

====== Shed Media ======
Title	Genre	Years	Network	Co-production with	Notes
Supernanny	Reality	2005–2020	ABC/Lifetime		
Supernanny Brazil	Reality	2006–2014	SBT		
The Real Housewives of New York City	Reality television	2008–present	Bravo	Bravo Media Productions	Owned by NBCUniversal Global Distribution
Who Do You Think You Are?	Documentary	2010–2022	NBC/TLC	Is or Isn't Entertainment	
Basketball Wives	Reality	2010–2025	VH1	MTV Entertainment Studios and Truly Original (season 10-)	Owned by Paramount Global Content Distribution
The Marriage Ref	Reality	2010–2011	NBC	Columbus 81 Productions and Ellen Rakieten Entertainment	
Bethenny Ever After	Documentary	2010–2012	Bravo	Bravo Media Productions	
Football Wives	Reality television	2010	VH1		Spin-off of Basketball Wives; Owned by Paramount Global Content Distribution
America's Supernanny	Documentary	2011–2013	Lifetime		
Texas Multi Mamas		2011–2012	We TV		
Styled to Rock	Reality competition	2013	Bravo	Fenty Films, Overbrook Entertainment and Marcy Media	
APB: With Troy Dunn		2014	TNT		
Livin' Lozada	Reality	2015–2016	OWN		
First Dates	Reality	2017	NBC	A Very Good Production	
Baller Wives	Reality	2017	VH1		
Polícia 24h	Reality television	2017–present	BAND/A&E		
Criminal Confessions	True crime	2017–2020	Oxygen	Wolf Entertainment	
Do or Dare		2017–2018	Facebook Watch	Matador Content and SpringHill Entertainment	
Genius Junior	Game show	2018	NBC	Prediction Productions	
Warriors of Liberty City		2018	Starz	SpringHill Entertainment and Dukes Up	
Mexican Dynasties	Reality television	2019–present	Bravo	Campanario Entertainment	
Murder for Hire	True crime	2019–2020	Oxygen	Wolf Entertainment and Green Lakes Productions	
Best Room Wins	Reality	2019	Bravo	Wall to Wall Media and Bravo Media Productions	
100 Humans	Reality	2020	Netflix	Warner Bros. Television, BlazHoffski and Rob & Joep Productions	
The Bradshaw Bunch	Reality	2020–2022	E!	Warner Horizon Unscripted Television	
The Real Housewives of Salt Lake City	Reality	2020–present	Bravo	Bravo Media Productions and Invent TV	
Fast Foodies	Reality	2021–present	TruTV		
The Real Housewives Ultimate Girls Trip	Reality	2021–present	Peacock	Bravo Media Productions	
Paris in Love	Reality	2021–present	Peacock	Slivington Manor Entertainment and Telepictures	
911 Crisis Center	Reality	2021–present	Oxygen		
Mathis Family Matters	Reality	2022–present	E!	E! Entertainment Television, Telepictures and Cube Five Productions	
101 Places to Party Before You Die	Reality	2022–present	TruTV	High & Mighty Productions, Clone Wolf, Inc., 3 Arts Entertainment and Artists First	

===== Telepictures =====
Title	Genre	Years	Network	Notes
My Favorite Martian	Science fiction	1963–1966	CBS	distribution only; currently distributed by the Peter Rodgers Organization
Here's Lucy	Sitcom	1968–1974	CBS	distribution only; currently owned by Desilu Too, LLC.
Mayberry R.F.D.	Sitcom	1968–1971	CBS	distribution only
The New Dick Van Dyke Show	Sitcom	1971–1974	CBS	distribution only
This Old House	Home improvement	1979–present	PBS	distribution for syndication from 1996 to 1999 produced by WGBH Educational Foundation (1979–2019), WETA-TV (2019–present) and This Old House Ventures
The People's Court	Reality court show	1981–1993; 1997–2023	Syndication	
Love Connection	Dating game show	1983–1994; 1998–1999; 2017–2018	Syndication/Fox	co-production with Eric Lieber Productions (1983–1994), PEL Productions (1998–1999), Warner Horizon Television and Next Entertainment (2017–2018)
Rituals	Soap opera	1984–1985	Syndication	co-production with Metromedia
The All New Let's Make a Deal	Comedy	1984–1986	Syndication	currently owned by Fremantle
Catchphrase	Game show	1985–1986	Syndication	co-production Pasetta Productions
ThunderCats	Action/Adventure	1985–1986	Syndication	co-production with Rankin/Bass Animated Entertainment
Showtime at the Apollo	Variety show	1987–2008	Syndication	
Trump Card	Game show	1990–1991	Syndication	co-production with Createl Ltd. and Fiedler/Berlin Productions
Fox's Fun House	Game show	1990–1991	Fox	co-production with Stone Stanley Productions
The Jesse Jackson Show	Talk show	1991	Syndication	co-production with Quincy Jones Entertainment
Best of the Worst	Comedy	1991–1992	Fox	co-production with The Wolper Organization and Lorimar Television
The Jenny Jones Show	Tabloid talk show	1991–2003	Syndication	co-production with David Salzman Enterprises and Quincy Jones-David Salzman Entertainment
The Jane Whitney Show	Tabloid talk show	1992–1994	Syndication/NBC	co-production with Scripps Howard Productions
Extra	Entertainment news magazine	1994–present	Syndication	co-production with Lisa G. Productions
The Rosie O'Donnell Show	Variety talk show	1996–2002	Syndication	not to be confused with The Rosie Show on OWN. Co-production with KidRo Productions
In Person with Maureen O'Boyle	Talk show	1996–1997	Syndication	
Change of Heart	Reality Television	1998–2003	Syndication	
The Queen Latifah Show	Talk show	1999–2001	Syndication	
Judge Mathis	Arbitration-based reality court show	1999–2023	Syndication	co-production with AND Syndicated Productions and Black Pearl Entertainment
Street Smarts	Game show	2000–2005	Syndication	co-production with AND Syndicated Productions and Entertain the Brutes (seasons 1–3)
ElimiDate	Reality Television	2001–2006	Syndication	co-production with AND Syndicated Productions
Spend It Fast		2002	Syndication	
The Caroline Rhea Show	Talk show	2002–2003	Syndication	Travail D'Amour Productions Inc.
Celebrity Justice	News show/nontraditional court show	2002–2005	Syndication	Harvey Levin Productions
Are You Hot?	Reality	2003	ABC	co-production with AND Syndicated Productions and Next Entertainment
The Sharon Osbourne Show	Talk show	2003–2004	Syndication	co-production with AND Syndicated Productions and SO Divine Productions
The Ellen DeGeneres Show	Talk show	2003–2022	Syndication	A Very Good Production and Warner Bros. Television
The Larry Elder Show	Talk show	2004–2005	Syndication	ANE Productions
The Tyra Banks Show	Talk show	2005–2010	Syndication/The CW	co-production with Bankable Productions and Handprint Entertainment (season 1)
The Dr. Keith Ablow Show	Talk show	2006–2007	Syndication	co-production with Dr. Keith Ablow Creative and LMNO Cable Group
TMZ on TV	Entertainment and gossip news television show	2007–present	Syndication	co-production with Harvey Levin Productions and ParaMedia; producer of pre-2021 episodes only
The Bonnie Hunt Show	Talk show	2008–2010	Syndication	co-production with Bob & Alice Productions and ParaMedia
Judge Jeanine Pirro	Court show	2008–2011	The CW/Syndication	
Lopez Tonight	Talk show	2009–2011	TBS	co-production with Warner Horizon Television, 2.2 Productions, Paramort Television and ParaMedia
Dr. Drew's Lifechangers	Talk show	2011–2012	The CW	co-production with Dr. Drew Productions and Lisa G. Productions
Anderson Live	Talk show	2011–2013	Syndication	co-production with Strongchild Productions
Bethenny	Talk show	2012–2014	Syndication	co-production with A Very Good Production
Let's Ask America	Game show	2012–2015	Syndication	co-production with Canter/Karask Industries, Paramedia, Apploff Entertainment and E.W. Scripps Company
The Real	Talk show	2013–2022	Syndication	co-production with 495 Productions (2013–2016)
Just Keke	Talk show	2014	BET	co-production with Mantis Productions
Candidly Nicole	Reality	2014–2015	VH1	co-production with Warner Bros. Television, World of Wonder and Honey Child Productions
Ellen's Design Challenge	Reality competition	2015–2016	HGTV	co-production with A Very Good Production and A. Smith & Co. Productions
Crime Watch Daily	Investigative newsmagazine	2015–2018	Syndication	co-production with Lisa G. Productions
Mad TV	Sketch comedy	2016	The CW	co-production with Montgomery Studios and Teitelbaum Artists
Ellen's Game of Games	Game show	2017–2021	NBC	co-production with Warner Horizon Unscripted Television and A Very Good Production
RuPaul	Talk show	2019	Syndication	co-production with World of Wonder and Warner Bros. Television
Ellen's Greatest Night of Giveaways	Miniseries	2019	Syndication	co-production with A Very Good Production
Family Game Fight!	Game show	2021–2022	NBC	co-production with Warner Horizon Unscripted Television, A Very Good Production and Dingus Von Pringus
Paris in Love	Reality	2021–2022	Peacock	co-production with Shed Media and Silvington Manor Entertainment
Mathis Family Matters	Reality	2022–present	E!	co-production Shed Media, E! Entertainment Television and Cube Five Productions
The Jennifer Hudson Show	Talk show	2022–present	Syndication	co-production with Warner Bros. Television and JHud Productions
How Music Got Free	Music	2024	Paramount+	co-production with Warner Bros. Television, MTV Entertainment Studios, SpringHill Company, Interscope Films and Shady Films

===== Stage 13 =====
Title	Years	Network	Co-production with
Snatchers	2017–2018	go90	MAKE Good Content
High & Mighty	2017	Stage 13	Divide/Conquer
Independent	2017	Stage 13	We Are Famous
Lipstick Empire	2017	Stage 13	Shed Media
Cooking on High	2018	Netflix	Conveyor Media
Marching Orders	2018	Netflix	Gigantic Productions
Special	2019–2021	Netflix	Warner Bros. Television, That's Wonderful Productions and Campfire
It's Bruno!	2019	Netflix	Warner Bros. Television, SLI Entertainment and Phiphen Pictures
Two Sentence Horror Stories	2019–2022	The CW	
Happily Ever Avatar	2020	HBO Max	

===== Machinima =====
Title	Years	Network	Co-production with
Feel Unreal	2004	Machinima	
A Great & Majestic Empire	2004	Machinima	
Consanguinity	2004	Machinima	
This Spartan Life	2005–2006	Machinima	
Medieval Weapon	2006	Machinima	
Arby 'n' the Chief	2007–present	Machinima	
Pathfinders	2007	Machinima	
Deus Ex Machina	2007–2008	Machinima	
Chuck Norris in Obilvision	2007–2009	Machinima	
Spriggs	2007–2008	Machinima	
Dude' Where's My Mount	2007–2008	Machinima	
Freeman's Mind	2007–2014	Machinima	
Pre Game Lobby	2008–2011	Machinima	
All Your History are Belong to Us	2009–2013	Machinima	
Doraleous & Associates	2010–2017	Machinima	Hank and Jed Movie Pictures
If It Were Realistic	2010–2011	Machinima	
Bright Falls	2010–2011	Machinima	
Sanity Not Included	2010–2016	Machinima	
Bite Me	2010–2012	Machinima	
Two Best Friends Play	2010–2017	Machinima	
Sonic for Hire	2011–present	Machinima	Lowbrow Studios
How It Should Have Ended: Video Games	2011–2013	Machinima	
The Noob Adventures	2011–2015	Machinima	
Red Faction Armageddon: The Machinima Series	2011	Machinima	
RCVR	2011	Machinima	Science to Fiction Transmedia
The Tommy Wi-Show	2011–2012	Machinima	
The Walking Dead: Torn Apart	2011	Machinima	AMC Networks
Dragon Age: Redemption	2011	Machinima	
Good Cops	2011–2013	Machinima	Good Cops Entertainment
Renegade Awesome	2011–2012	Machinima	Appsro Animation
Co-Op Life	2011–2012	Machinima	
Skyrim Battles	2011–2012	Machinima	
7 Brothers	2011–2012	Machinima	
Factual Game Facts About Facts	2011–2012	Machinima	Appsro Animation
Battlefield Friends	2012–2022	Machinima	Hank and Jed Movie Pictures
The Locals	2012	Machinima	
Mega Man Dies at the End	2012–2013	Machinima	Lowbrow Studios
Two Best Friends Funtime Adventures	2012–2013	Machinima	
Halo After Dawn	2012	Machinima	
NoPUNintendo	2012	Machinima	
Daybreak	2012	Machinima	
Crossing the Streams	2012	Machinima	
Life on the Road	2012	Machinima	
Amalgames	2012	Machinima	
Prank Lab	2012–2013	Machinima	Katalyst Media
Sifi & Oily: The Game Review	2012	Machinima	
The Controller: Medal of Honor Warfighter	2012	Machinima	
Ragemelon	2012–2024	Machinima	
Smash Champ	2012–2016	Machinima	Smashbits Animation
XARM	2012	Machinima	Endemol USA
Halo 4: Forward Unto Dawn	2012	Machinima	Microsoft Studios, 343 Industries
Infonaut	2012	Machinima	
Battlestar Galactica: Blood & Chrome	2012	Machinima	Universal Cable Productions
War Soldiers	2012–2013	Machinima	Mondo Media
Mob Squad	2012–2014	Machinima	Appsro Animation (season 1); Hank and Jed Movie Pictures (season 2)
Teenage Pokemon	2012–2013	Machinima	Destructoid
Action Faction	2013	Machinima	Appsro Animation
Space Adventure Legend Quest	2013	Machinima	
Battleloggers	2013	Machinima	Hank and Jed Movie Pictures
Omega	2013	Machinima	Wayside Creations
Happy Hour Tales	2013–2014	Machinima	
The cLAN	2013	Machinima	Reckless Tortuga
Tainted Love	2013	Machinima	From Drivey By Entertainment
Morty Kombat	2013	Machinima	Lowbrow Studios
Raw Latex	2013–2016	Machinima	
Battle Action Robot Force	2013	Machinima	Lowbrow Studios
How It's Played	2013	Machinima	Lowbrow Studios
Game Over	2013	Machinima	
Boss Battles	2013–2017	Machinima	Smashbits Animation
Media Overlord Billion	2013	Machinima	
Happy Hour Saloon	2013–2016	Machinima	
Timbleweed	2013	Machinima	Good Cops Entertainment; Room 568 Entertainment
Behind the Magic	2013	Machinima	
Always On	2013–2014	Machinima	
Lou Plays	2014	Machinima	
My Morphing Life	2014	YouTube	
Chasing the Cup	2014–2016	Machinima/The CW	
Counterspell	2014	Machinima	Smashbits Animation
Super Booby Greasy Warriors	2014	Machinima	
NPC	2014	Machinima	
Titanfall: Dropouts	2014	Machinima	
AFK	2014–2015	Machinima	
Street Fighter: Assassin's Fist	2014	Machinima	
Creepy Text Theatre	2014–2017	Machinima	
Chop Shop	2014	Machinima	Bandito Brothers; Insurge Pictures
Dr. 1Up	2014	Machinima	
Random Things You Should Know	2014–2015	Machinima	
Real Fake History	2015	Machinima	
Spacebar	2015–2017	Machinima	
Dank/Fire	2015–2016	Machinima	
Sandbox with JeromeASF	2015–2016	Playstation Vue	
All Systems Go	2015–2016	Playstation Vue	
The Bacca Chronicles	2015	go90	
Street Fighter: Resurrection	2016	go90	
Heroes with Issues	2016–2018	YouTube	
Inside Esports	2016–2017	go90	
Web Tales	2016	go90	
FYI	2016	go90	
Transformers: Prime Wars Trilogy	2016–2018	go90	Hasbro Studios
Happy Wheels: The Series	2016	go90	Bunim/Murray Productions
Greater Creators	2017	go90	19 Productions
Tales from the Trenches	2017	Machinima	
Body Count Fighting	2017–2018	Machinima	
VR Developer Challenge	2017–2018	Machinima	
Co-Op Connection	2017–2018	Facebook Watch	

===== Warner Bros. International Television Production =====
Title	Genre	Years	Network	Notes
The New Adventures of Robin Hood	Adventure	1997–1998	TNT/Syndication	co-production with Tarnview Limited, Dune Productions, M6, Weintraub/Kuhn Productions and Baltic Ventures International
Treasure Island	Reality competition	1997–present	TVNZ 2	continued from Eyeworks Touchdown
The Legend of Calamity Jane	Animation	1997–1998	Canal+ The WB (Kids' WB)	co-production with Gangster Production and Contre Allée
The New Adventures of Zorro	Animation	1997–1998	Syndication	co-production with Zorro Productions, Inc., Carrington Productions International, Harvest Entertainment and Fred Wolf Films Dublin
Police Academy: The Series	Sitcom	1997–1998	Syndication	co-production with Paul Maslansky Productions, Goodman/Rosen Productions and Protocol Entertainment
The Fantastic Voyages of Sinbad the Sailor	Animation	1998	Cartoon Network	co-production with WW Productions, Ventureworld Films, Carrington Productions International and Fred Wolf Films Dublin
Code Name: Eternity	Science fiction	2000	Global Television Network/M6	co-production with Dune Productions, Protocol Entertainment and UFA International Film & TV Production
Dark Realm	Anthology	2001	Syndication	co-production with Dune Productions, Atlantique Productions and UFA International Film & TV Production
Who Do You Think You Are? Australia	Documentary	2008–present	SBS	co-production with Artemis Media (seasons 1–7)
The Block NZ	Reality	2012–2022	Three	
Gabriela	Telenovela	2012	TV Globo	co-production with Estúdios Globo
Food Unwrapped	Consumer	2012–2025	Channel 4	co-production with Ricochet
Territory Cops	Factual television	2012–present	Crime & Investigation Network/Network 10	co-production with McAvoy Media
The Bachelor Australia	Reality	2013–2023	Network 10	co-production with Shine Australia (seasons 1–3)
Jills veranda	Documentary	2014–2020	SVT1	
The Bachelor New Zealand	Dating-based competition show	2015–2023	Three/TVNZ 2	
The Bachelorette Australia	Reality	2015–2023	Network 10	co-production with Shine Australia (season 1)
First Dates Australia	Reality	2016–2022	Seven Network/Network 10	
You Are Wanted	Drama	2017–2018	Amazon Prime Video	co-production with Pantaleon Films
Little Big Shots Australia	Reality	2017–2018	Seven Network	
Married at First Sight NZ	Reality	2017–2019	Three	
Bachelor in Paradise Australia	Reality	2018–2020	Network 10	
All or Nothing: New Zealand All Blacks	Reality	2018	Amazon Prime Video	co-production with Mother Media Group and Pang
Game of Games	Game show	2018	Network 10	
The Great Kiwi Bake Off	Baking	2018–present	TVNZ 2/TVNZ 1	
Dancing with the Stars	Reality	2019–present	Network 10/Seven Network	Prior seasons produced by other companies. Co-production with BBC Studios
Brigada Costa del Sol	Serial drama	2019	Telecinco	co-production with Mediaset España
The Masked Singer Australia	Reality television	2019–2023	Network 10	
Man in Room 301	Drama	2019	Elisa Viihde	co-production with Wall to Wall Media and Inkas Film & T.V. Productions
Black Hands	Drama	2020	TVNZ 1	
Pray, Obey, Kill	Docuseries	2021	HBO	co-production with HBO Entertainment, HBO Documentary Films and HBO Europe
RuPaul's Drag Race Down Under	Reality competition	2021–present	Stan; TVNZ 2	co-production with World of Wonder
The Masked Singer NZ	Reality competition	2021–present	Three	
The Celebrity Apprentice Australia	Reality	2021–2022	Nine Network	Prior seasons produced by FremantleMedia Australia
Snackmasters Australia	Food	2021–2022	Nine Network	
Love Me	Drama	2021	Foxtel	co-production with Aquarius Films
Delphine: The Secret Princess	Docuseries	2022	HBO Max	
The Repair Shop Australia	Factual	2022–present	Lifestyle	
The Twelve	Court drama	2022–present	Fox Showcase	co-production with Easy Tiger Productions
FBOY Island NZ	Reality	2022–present	TVNZ+	

====== Ricochet ======
Title	Years	Network	Notes
No Going Back	2002–2004	Channel 4	
Born to Be Different	2003–2020	Channel 4	
FightBox	2003	BBC Three	
Risking It All	2004	Channel 4	
Supernanny	2004–2008	Channel 4	
How Not to Decorate	2004–2006	Channel 5	
Flying Heavy Metal	2005	Discovery Channel UK	
It's Me or the Dog	2005–present	Channel 4/Really; Animal Planet	
Extreme Dreams with Ben Fogle	2006–2009	BBC Two	
Sex in Court	2007	E4	
Clutter Nutters	2007	CBBC	
Fat March	2007	ABC	
Breaking Into Tesco	2008	Channel 5	
Unbreakable	2008	Channel 5	
Mastercrafts	2010–2014	BBC Two/More4	
World's Most Dangerous Roads	2011–present	BBC Two/Dave	continued from Renegade Pictures
Food Unwrapped	2012–present	Channel 4	co-production with Warner Bros. International Television Production
Stacey Dooley Investigates	2012–present	BBC Three	
Ben Fogle: New Lives in the Wild	2013–present	Channel 5	continued from Renegade Pictures co-production with Motion Content Group
Channel Patrol	2014–2015	BBC One	
Cowboy Builders and Bodge Jobs	2015–2016	Channel 5	
Sun, Sea and Selling Houses	2017–present	Channel 4	
The Repair Shop	2017–present	BBC Two/BBC One	
Celebrity 5 Go Motorbiking	2017	Channel 5	co-production with Krempelwood Entertainment
Extreme Hair Wars	2018	5Star	
Celebrity 5 Go Barging	2018–2019	Channel 5	
The Bidding Room	2020–present	BBC One	
Love Bites	2020–2021	ITV2	
Jay's Yorkshire Workshop	2021–present	BBC Two	
Kings of the Wood	2022–present	Quest	co-production with Krempelwood Entertainment and Drive TV
Britain's Top Takeaways	2022	BBC Two	
Amazing Cleans	2022–present	5Star	

====== Twenty Twenty Television ======
Title	Years	Network	Notes
Inside the Brotherhood	1989–1991	ITV	co-production with Granada Television
The Big Story	1993–2007	ITV	co-production with Carlton Television
The Boer War	1999	Channel 4	
Second Sight	2000–2001	BBC One	
Lads' Army	2002–2006	ITV	
Thursday the 12th	2003	Bravo	co-production with Strand Productions; Unaired in the UK
That'll Teach 'Em	2003–2006	Channel 4	
Brat Camp	2005–2007	Channel 4 ABC	
Wakey Wakey Campers	2005	Channel 4	
I Know What You Ate Last Summer	2005	Channel 5	
Evacuation	2006–2008	CBBC	
The Choir	2006–2016	BBC Two	
Never Did Me Any Harm	2007	Channel 4	
The Sorcerer's Apprentice	2007–2010	CBBC	
Grandad's Back in Business	2007	BBC Two	
The World's Strictest Parents	2008–2011	BBC Three	
Ballroom High	2009	Sky One	
Gareth Malone's Extraordinary School for Boys	2010	BBC Two	
Ben 10: Ultimate Challenge	2011	Cartoon Network UK	
My Transsexual Summer	2011	Channel 4	
Show Me What You're Made Of	2011–present	CBBC	
The Hoarder Next Door	2012–2014	Channel 4	
Styled to Rock	2012	Sky Living	co-production with Fenty Films, Overbrook Entertainment and Marcy Media Films
Animal Heroes	2013	ITV	
First Dates	2013–present	Channel 4	
The Restaurant Man	2014	BBC Two	
Man Vs Weird	2014	Channel 4	
The Naked Choir	2015	BBC Two	
Gareth Malone's Great Choir Reunion	2015	BBC Two	
Gareth's Invictus Choir	2016	BBC One	
Britain's Hardest Workers: Inside the Low Wage Economy	2016	BBC Two	
Remotely Funny	2017–2018	CBBC	
The Best of British Takeaways	2017	BBC Two	
The Davina Hour	2017	W	
A House Through Time	2018–present	BBC Two	
The Big Audition	2018	ITV	
Traitors	2019	Channel 4 Netflix	co-production with 42; Previously titled 'Jerusalem'
All That Glitters: Britain's Next Jewellery Star	2021–2022	BBC Two	
Save Our Squad with David Beckham	2022	Disney+	co-production with Studio 99
Five Star Kitchen: Britain's Next Great Chef	2023–present	Channel 4 Netflix	Originally titled 'Five Star Chef'

====== Watershed TV ======
Title	Years	Network	Notes
Street Kid World Cup	2014	BBC Three	co-production with Ricochet

====== Wall to Wall Media ======
Title	Years	Network	Notes
A Statement of Affairs	1993	ITV	co-production with Carlton Television
Plotlands	1997	BBC One	
All Mod Cons	1997	BBC Two	
Body Story	1998–2000	Channel 4 Discovery Channel	
Sex, Chips & Rock n' Roll	1999	BBC One	
Naked Planet	1999–2000	Channel 4	
The 1900 House	1999–2000	Channel 4 PBS	
The Wedding Planner	2001	Living TV	
One Hit Wonderland	2002	Discovery Channel	
Joe Millionaire UK	2003–2004	E4	co-production with Fox UK
Regency House Party	2004	Channel 4	
Who Do You Think You Are?	2004–present	BBC Two/BBC One	
Not Forgotten	2005–2009	Channel 4	
Waterloo Road	2006–present	BBC One	continued from Shed Productions and Headstrong Pictures co-production with Rope Ladder Fiction
Surviving Disaster	2009	Paramount Network	co-production with Spike Cable Networks
Long Lost Family	2011–present	ITV	
Italy Unpacked	2013–2015	BBC Two	
Car SOS	2013–present	National Geographic UK	continued from Renegade Pictures
Child Genius	2013–present	Channel 4	
The Art of Australia	2013	BBC Four	co-production with Serendipity Productions
The Voice: Louder on Two	2014	BBC Two	co-production with Talpa
Back in Time for...	2015–2022	BBC Two	
First Peoples	2015	PBS	co-production with Arte France
Time Crashers	2015	Channel 4	co-production with GroupM Entertainment
UK's Best Part-Time Band	2016	BBC Four	
500 Questions	2016	ITV	
Lawless Oceans	2017	National Geographic	
Little Big Shots	2017–2018	ITV	
The Sweet Makers	2017	BBC Two	
Mysteries of the Missing	2017	Science Channel	
Dope	2017–2019	Netflix	
Rome Unpacked	2018	BBC Two	
100 Years Younger in 10 Days	2018	ITV	
Churchill's Secret Agents: The New Recruits	2018	BBC Two; Netflix	
Nadiya's Asian Odyssey	2018	BBC Two	
The Twinstitute	2019	BBC Two	
Glow Up: Britain's Next Make-Up Star	2019–present	BBC Three	
The Yorkshire Ripper Files: A Very British Crime Story	2019	BBC Four	
Best Room Wins	2019	Bravo	co-production with Shed Media and Bravo Media Productions
Nature's Strangest Mysteries: Solved	2019	Animal Planet	
Narcoworld: Dope Stories	2019	Netflix	
Man in Room 301	2019	Elisa Viihde	co-production with Warner Bros. ITVP Finland and Inkas Film & T.V. Productions
Nadiya Bakes	2020	BBC Two	
The Shipman Files: A Very British Crime Story	2020	BBC Two	
My Family, the Holocaust and Me	2020	BBC One	
Becoming You	2020	Apple TV+	
Alien Worlds	2020	Netflix	
Narco Wars	2020–2022	National Geographic	
21 Day Body Turnaround with Michael Mosley	2021	Channel 4	
Growing Up Animal	2021	Disney+	co-production with National Geographic
Killers of the Cosmos	2021	Science Channel	
Nadiya's Fast Flavours	2021	BBC Two	
The Nilsen Files	2022	BBC Two	
Aids: The Unheared Tapes	2022–present	BBC Two	
Flordelis: A Family Crime	2022	HBO Max	
Go Hard or Go Home	2023–present	BBC Three	

====== Shed Productions ======
Programme	Genre	Series	Episodes	Duration	Channel
Bad Girls	Drama	8	107	1999–2006	ITV1
Footballers' Wives	Drama	5	42	2002–2006	ITV1
Bombshell	Military drama	1	7	2004	ITV1 (Unaired in the UK)
Footballers' Wives Extra Time		2	32	2005–2006	ITV2
Footballers Wives TV		1	8	2005	ITV2
The Fugitives	Science fiction	1	7	2005	CITV
Waterloo Road	Drama	10	200	2006–2015	BBC One (2006–2015); BBC Three (2015)
Rock Rivals	Drama	1	8	2008	ITV1
Hope Springs	Comedy drama	1	8	2009	BBC One

====== Shed Media Scotland ======
Title	Years	Network	Notes
Being Victor	2010	MTV UK (Internet); STV (Edited)	
Waterloo Road Reunited	2011	BBC Online	
Sugartown	2011	BBC One	
Young James Herriot	2011	BBC One	co-production with Koco Drama

====== Headstrong Pictures ======
Title	Years	Network	Notes
New Tricks	2003–2015	BBC One	Previously produced by Wall to Wall Media

====== Renegade Pictures ======
Title	Years	Network	Notes
Don't Tell the Bride	2007–2020	BBC Three/BBC One/Sky One/E4	
Picture This	2008	Channel 4	
Planet Mechanics	2008	National Geographic	
Extreme Bodies	2008–2009	Discovery Channel	
Little Crackers	2010–2012	Sky One	co-production with Blue Door Adventures, Phil Mclntyre Television, Sprout Pictures, Tiger Aspect Productions, Silver River Productions, Glassbox Productions, Avalon Television and Can Communicate
The Secret Life of Buildings	2011	Channel 4	co-production with Christie HQ and The Open University
Bigger Than...	2012	Sky Living	
Drive to Buy	2012	ITV	
Street Genius	2013–2015	National Geographic UK	
24 Hours to Go Broke	2014	Dave	
Transformation Street	2018	ITV	co-production with Storyvault Films
Our Yorkshire Farm	2018–2021	Channel 5	co-production with Motion Content Group
City Life to Country Life	2020	Channel 5	
Surviving the Stone Age: Adventure to the Wild	2020	Channel 4	
Outsiders	2021–present	Dave	co-production with That M&V Company
Sue Perkins' Big American Road Trip	2022	Channel 4	

====== Yalli Productions ======
Title	Years	Network	Notes
Impractical Jokers UK	2012–2016	BBC Three/Channel 5 Comedy Central	
The Ginge, The Geordie and the Geek	2013	BBC Two	
Viral Tap	2014	ITV2	

====== Koco Drama ======
Title	Years	Network	Notes
Young James Herriot	2011	BBC One	co-production with Shed Media Scotland

====== Eyeworks ======
Title	Years	Network	Notes
De Nationale IQ Test	2001–2016	Nederland 2/Nederland 1/NPO 1/RTL 4	
Sterren Dansen Op Het IJs	2006–2013	SBS6	
Wie words Tarzan?	2006	SBS6	
So You Wanna Be a Popstar	2007	SBS6	
Chef in Nood	2008	VTM	
CQC	2008–2015	BAND	as Eyeworks Cuatro Cabezas
NZ Smashes Guinness World Records	2009	TVNZ 2	
Dag & Nacht: Hotel Eburon	2010	VTM	
Australia Smashes Guinness World Records	2010	Seven Network	as Eyeworks Australia
Op zoek naar Zorro	2010–2011	AVRO	
A Liga	2010–2016	BAND	as Eyeworks Cuatro Cabezas
Polícia 24h	2010–2016	BAND/A&E	(Season 1–6), as Eyework Cuatro Cabezas
24 uur: tussen leven en dood	2012	RTL 4	
Sterren Springen Op Zaterdag	2012–2014	SBS6	
Celebrity Splash!	2013	Seven Network	as Eyeworks Australia
Amazing Greys	2014	ITV	co-production with ITV Studios

===== Cartoon Network Studios =====
====== Cartoon Network Productions ======
Show	Year(s)	Network	Co-production(s)	Notes
Captain Planet and the Planeteers	1990–1996	TBS	DIC Entertainment, Turner Program Services (seasons 1–3) and Hanna-Barbera (seasons 4–6)	Administration only
The Moxy Show	1993–1995	Cartoon Network	Colossal Pictures	
Cartoon Planet	1995–1998; 2012–2014	Cartoon Network	Ghost Planet Industries (1995–1997) and Turner Studios	A spin-off of Space Ghost Coast to Coast.
The Tex Avery Show	1996–2002	Cartoon Network		
Ed, Edd n Eddy	1999–2009	Cartoon Network	A.k.a. Cartoon	
Cult Toons	1999–2000	Cartoon Network UK	Cartoon Network Europe and Exceeda	
Mike, Lu & Og	1999–2001	Cartoon Network	Kinofilm	
Courage the Cowardly Dog	1999–2002	Cartoon Network	Stretch Films	
Sheep in the Big City	2000–2002	Cartoon Network	Curious Pictures	
Codename: Kids Next Door	2002–2008	Cartoon Network	Curious Pictures	
Immortal Grand Prix	2003–2006	Adult Swim (Toonami)	Production I.G. and Bandai Entertainment	
Sunday Pants	2005	Cartoon Network	Spitfire Studios	
Powerpuff Girls Z	2006–2007	TV Tokyo; Cartoon Network Japan	Toei Animation, Aniplex and Ocean Productions	Distributed by Sony Pictures Television
Skatoony	2006–2013	Cartoon Network UK; Teletoon	Cartoon Network Europe, Talent TV and FremantleMedia Animation (UK); Marblemedia and Smiley Guy Studios (NA); Blink Studios UAE	
My Spy Family	2007–2010	Boomerang UK	Kindle Entertainment	
The Secret Saturdays	2008–2010	Cartoon Network	PorchLight Entertainment	
The Othersiders	2009	Cartoon Network		
BrainRush	2009	Cartoon Network		
Destroy Build Destroy	2009–2011	Cartoon Network	Mess Media and Idiot Box Productions	
Dude, What Would Happen	2009–2011	Cartoon Network	Dalaklis Media Enterprises	
Bobb'e Says	2009	Cartoon Network		
Hero: 108	2010–2012	Cartoon Network	MoonScoop Entertainment, Gamania, Telegael and Hong Ying Animation	
La CQ	2012–2014	Cartoon Network Latin America	Televisa and RCTV Studios	
Exchange Student Zero	2015	Cartoon Network Australia	Fragrant Gumtree Entertainment and Cartoon Network Southeast Asia Pacific	
The Happos Family	2016–2018	Boomerang UK/Cartoonito	Spider Eye Productions, Cyber Group Studios (uncredited) and Ferrero SpA (uncredited)	
Villainous	2017–2021	Cartoon Network Latin America	Cartoon Network Productions Mexico and A.I Animation Studio	
Ninjin	2019–2021	Cartoon Network Latin America	Birdo Studio and Pocket Trap	
Monster Beach	2020	Cartoon Network Australia	Bogan Entertainment Solutions and Fragrant Gumtree Entertainment	

===== Turner Program Services =====
Title	Genre	Years	Network	Notes
Starcade	Game show	1982–1984	Superstation WTBS/Syndication	co-production with JM Production Company; Rights now owned by Shout! Factory
Portrait of America		1983–1988	Superstation WTBS	
Ultraseven	Tokusatsu	1985	TNT	English dub; co-produced with Cinar; TPS's rights to the series reverted to Tsuburaya Productions in 2001
The Wonder Years (Note: Currently distributed by Disney–ABC Home Entertainment and Television Distribution through 20th Television.)	Comedy drama	1988–1993	ABC	produced by The Black-Marlens Company and New World Television
Beach Boys: Endless Summer		1989	CBS	co-production with Brother Records
The Last Word	Game show	1989	Syndication/Global Television Network	U.S. distribution only; produced by Merrill Heatter Productions
Lauren Hutton and...		1995–1996	Syndication	
The Lazarus Man	Western	1996	TNT	produced by The Ogiens/Kane Company and Castle Rock Entertainment

===== Lorimar Television =====
- Rowan & Martin's Laugh-In (1968–1973) (Broadcast syndication rights only)
- The Good Life (with Screen Gems, 1971–1972) (Note: Distributed by Sony Pictures Television; Warner Bros. owns the program's copyrights.)
- The Waltons (1972–1981)
- Doc Elliot (1973–1974) (co-production with Corsican Productions Inc.)
- Apple's Way (1974–1975)
- The Blue Knight (1975–1976)
- Helter Skelter (TV miniseries) (1976)
- Sybil (TV miniseries) (1976)
- Eight Is Enough (1977–1981)
- Dallas (1978–1991)
- Kaz (1978–1979)
- Flatbush (1979)
- Knots Landing (1979–1993) (co-produced with Roundelay Productions (1979–1982); (seasons 1–3) and Roundelay-MF Productions (1982–1993) (seasons 4–12))
- Skag (1980)
- Flamingo Road (1980–1982) (co produced with MF Productions)
- The People's Court (1981–1993)
- Falcon Crest (1981–1990) (co-produced with Amanda and MF Productions)
- King's Crossing (1982)
- Boone (1983)
- Two Marriages (1983–1984)
- Just Our Luck (1983) (co-production with Lawrence Gordon Productions)
- Love Connection (1983–1993)
- Maggie Briggs (1984) (co-production with Chagrin Productions)
- Christopher Columbus (TV miniseries) (1984)
- Berrenger's (1985) (co-production with Roundelay Productions)
- Detective in the House (1985)
- Our Family Honor (1985–1986) (co-produced by Lawrence Gordon/Charles Gordon Productions)
- The Best Times (1985) (co-production with Beechwood Productions)
- The Redd Foxx Show (1986) (co-production with Thunder Road Productions)
- Mama's Family (1986–1990 version, distribution only)
- ALF (1986–1990) (currently distributed by Shout! Factory in United States only, international distribution handled by Warner Bros. Television)
- The Hogan Family (1986–1991) (Co-produced by Miller-Boyett Productions and TAL Productions, Inc. (1986–87) (seasons 1–2))
- Perfect Strangers (1986–1993) (co-produced by Miller-Boyett Productions)
- The Slap Maxwell Story (1987) (co-production with You and Me Kid Productions)
- Full House (1987–1993) (co-produced by Jeff Franklin Productions and Miller-Boyett Productions)
- Midnight Caller (1988–1991) (co-produced by December 3 Productions and Gangbuster Films, Inc.)
- Paradise (1988–1991) (co-production with Roundelay Productions)
- Freddy's Nightmares (1988–1990) (with New Line Television and Stone Television)
- Fun House (1988–1990) (with Stone Television)
- Studio 5-B (1989)
- Nearly Departed (1989) (co-produced by Baskin-Schulman Productions)
- 3rd Degree (1989–1990) (co-production with Kline and Friends Productions and Burt and Bert Productions)
- Island Son (1989–1990) (co-produced with Malli Point Productions)
- Family Matters (1989–1993) (co-produced by Bickley-Warren Productions and Miller-Boyett Productions)
- The Family Man (1990–1991) (Co-production with Catalina Television and Miller-Boyett Productions)
- Going Places (1990–1991) (Co-produced by Miller-Boyett Productions)
- D.E.A. (1990) (co-produced by Dark Ink Inc. Productions)
- Gabriel's Fire (1990–1991) (co-produced by Crystal Beach Entertainment and Coleman Luck Productions)
- It (1990) (co-production with DawnField Entertainment, The Königsberg/Sanitsky Company and Green/Epstein Productions)
- Pros and Cons (1991–1992) (co-production with Schenck/Cardea Productions)
- Dark Justice (1991–1993) (co-produced by Magnum Productions with David Salzman Entertainment)
- Reasonable Doubts (1991–1993) (co-produced with December 3 Productions)
- Homefront (1991–1993) (co-produced with Roundelay Productions and Latham/Lechowick Productions)
- I'll Fly Away (1991–1993) (co-produced with Brand-Falsey Productions)
- Sisters (1991–1993)
- Step by Step (1991–1993) (co-produced by Bickley-Warren Productions and Miller-Boyett Productions
- Bill & Ted's Excellent Adventures (1992) (co-production with Orion Television, Nelson '91, & Innuendo Productions) (co-distributed with MGM Television)
- Scorch (1992) (co-production with Allan Katz Productions, Saban/Scherick Productions and Honeyland Productions)
- Hangin' with Mr. Cooper (1992–1993) (Co-produced by Bickley-Warren Productions (1994–97) (seasons 3–5) and Jeff Franklin Productions)
- Bodies of Evidence (1992–1993)
- Shaky Ground (1992–1993) (co-production with Keyes Brothers Productions)
- Going to Extremes (1992–93) (Co-produced by Brand/Falsey Productions)
- Time Trax (1993) (co-produced by Gary Nardino Productions)
- It Had to Be You (1993) (co-produced with Highest Common Denominator Productions)

====== Lorimar-Telepictures ======
Title	Genre	Years	Notes
It's a Living	Sitcom	1980–1982, 1985–1989	produced by Witt/Thomas Productions
ThunderCats	Action/Adventure	1986–1989	
The $1,000,000 Chance of a Lifetime	Game show	1986–1987	
Perfect Match	Game show	1986	
SilverHawks	Animated television series	1986	
One Big Family		1986–1987	
Our House	Drama	1986–1988	Co-produced with Blinn/Thorpe Productions
Better Days	Sitcom	1986	co-production with Magnum/Thunder Road Productions
Max Headroom	Science fiction	1987–1988	co-produced by Chrysalis/Lakeside
The Comic Strip	Animated television series	1987	produced by Rankin/Bass Animated Entertainment
ALF: The Animated Series	Saturday morning animated series	1987–1989	currently distributed by Shout! Factory
She's the Sheriff	Sitcom	1987–1989	
Spies	Drama	1987	
Alvin and the Chipmunks	Comedy	1988	syndication, first 65 episodes only
Gumby Adventures	Clay animation	1988	currently owned by Fox Corporation
Aaron's Way	Family drama	1988	
ALF Tales	Saturday morning animated series	1988–1989	currently distributed by Shout! Factory
Jake's Journey	Television pilot	1988–1989	pilots for CBS starring Graham Chapman

====== ZIV International ======
All rights to these series have reverted to their original owners.

- Fables of the Green Forest (1978)
- Little Lulu (1978)
- The Adventures of Captain Future (1980)
- Angel (1980)
- Candy (1981)
- King Arthur & the Knights of the Round Table (1981)

==== The Wolper Organization (post-1970) ====
- Appointments with Destiny (1971–1973)
- American Heritage (1973–1975)
- Primal Man (1973–1975)
- Sandburg's Lincoln (1974–1976)
- Chico and the Man (1974–1978)
- Welcome Back, Kotter (1975–1979)
- Roots (1977)
- Roots: The Next Generations (1979)
- North and South (1985–1994) (co-production with Warner Bros. Television and Amy Productions Inc. of Delaware)
- Penn & Teller: Bullshit! (2003–2010) (co-production with Showtime Networks, Star Price Productions and Penn & Teller)
- Salem's Lot (2004) (co-production with Warner Bros. Television and Coote/Hayes Productions)

==== Seven Arts Television ====
- Marine Boy (1967)
- Johnny Cypher in Dimension Zero (1968)

==== Turner Entertainment Co. ====
This includes most of the pre-May 1986 MGM Television library, which Warner Bros. Entertainment distributes through its 1996 acquisition of Turner Entertainment.

- MGM Parade (1955–1956)
- The Thin Man (1957–1959) (Based on the 1934 film and its sequels by MGM)
- Northwest Passage (1958–1959)
- National Velvet (1960)
- The Best of the Post (1960)
- The Islanders (1960–1961)
- The Asphalt Jungle (1961)
- Cain's Hundred (1961–1962)
- Dr. Kildare (1961–1966) (Based on the 1937 movie Internes Can't Take Money and its sequels by MGM)
- Father of the Bride (1961–1962) (Based on the 1950 film and its sequel by MGM)
- Sam Benedict (1962–1963)
- The Eleventh Hour (1962–1964)
- The Lieutenant (1963–1964)
- Harry's Girls (1963)
- The Travels of Jaimie McPheeters (1963–1964)
- Mr. Novak (1963–1965)
- Gilligan's Island (1964–1967) (produced by United Artists Television and CBS Productions)
- Made in America (1964)
- Many Happy Returns (1964–1965)
- Mickey (1964–1965)
- The Man from U.N.C.L.E. (1964–1968)
- A Man Called Shenandoah (1965–1966)
- Please Don't Eat the Daisies (1965–1967) (Based on the 1960 movie of the same name by MGM)
- Tom and Jerry (1965–1972)
- Daktari (1966–1969)
- Preview Tonight (1966) (episode "Seven Good Years and Seven Lean")
- The Rounders (1966–1967)
- The Girl from U.N.C.L.E. (1966–1967)
- Jericho (1966–1967)
- The Forsyte Saga (1967 mini-series)
- Off to See the Wizard (1967–1968) (Based on The Wizard of Oz)
- Hondo (1967) (Based on the 1953 film by Warner Bros.)
- Maya (1967–1968) (Based on the 1966 film by MGM)
- Then Came Bronson (1969–1970)
- The Courtship of Eddie's Father (1969–1972) (Based on the 1960 film by MGM)
- Medical Center (1969–1976)
- Young Dr. Kildare (1972)
- Assignment Vienna (1972)
- Hello Mother, Goodbye! (1973 pilot for NBC starring Bette Davis)
- Adam's Rib (1973) (Based on the 1949 film by MGM)
- Hawkins (1973–1974)
- Shaft (1973–1974)
- The New Adventures of Gilligan (1974–1975) (produced by Filmation Associates)
- Adams of Eagle Lake (1975) (produced by MGM Television and Andy Griffith Enterprises)
- The New Tom and Jerry Show (1975–1977) (produced by MGM Television and Hanna-Barbera)
- Bronk (1975–1976)
- The Practice (1976–1977)
- The Montefuscos (1976)
- Jigsaw John (1976)
- Executive Suite (1976–1977)
- How the West Was Won (1977 mini-series, 1978–1979)
- CHiPs (1977–1983) (produced by Rosner Television and MGM Television)
- Logan's Run (1977–1978) (Based on the 1976 film by MGM)
- Lucan (1977–1978)
- The French Atlantic Affair (1979 mini-series)
- Beyond Westworld (1980) (produced by MGM Television and Low Shaw Productions)
- The Tom and Jerry Comedy Show (1980–1982) (produced by MGM Television and Filmation Associates)
- McClain's Law (1981–1982)
- Chicago Story (1982)
- Gavilan (1982–1983) (produced by MGM Television and Mandy Films)
- Meatballs & Spaghetti (1982) (produced by MGM Television, Intermedia Entertainment and Marvel Productions)
- Pandamonium (1982) (produced by MGM Television, Intermedia Entertainment Company and Marvel Productions)
- Gilligan's Planet (1982–1983) (produced by MGM Television and Filmation Associates)
- Thicke of the Night (1983)
- The Yearling (1983–1985) (Based on the 1946 film by MGM)
- Empire (1984)
- Jessie (1984) (produced by MGM Television and Lindsay Wagner-David Gerber Productions)
- Mighty Orbots (1984–1985) (produced by MGM Television, Intermedia Entertainment and TMS Entertainment)
- Tom & Jerry Kids (1990–1993) (co-produced with Hanna-Barbera)
- The Wizard of Oz (1990) (co-produced with DIC Entertainment; currently co-owned with WildBrain)
- Droopy, Master Detective (1993) (co-produced with Hanna-Barbera)
- Tom and Jerry Tales (2006–2008) (produced by Warner Bros. Animation)
- Coma (2012) (produced by Warner Bros. Television, Scott Free Productions and Sony Pictures Television)
- The Tom and Jerry Show (2014–2021) (produced by Warner Bros. Animation and Renegade Animation)
- Dorothy and the Wizard of Oz (2017–2020) (produced by Warner Bros. Animation)
- Tom and Jerry in New York (2021) (produced by Warner Bros. Animation; copyrighted to Warner Bros.)

==== Castle Rock Entertainment ====
- Seinfeld (1989–1998) (with Giggling Goose Productions, West/Shapiro Productions & Fred Barron Productions)
- Homeroom (1989)
- Ann Jillian (1989–1990)
- New Attitude (1990)
- Morton & Hayes (1991)
- Sessions (1991) (co-production with HBO)
- The Powers That Be (1992) (with Act III Television, ELP Communications and Columbia Pictures Television) (Note: Rights owned by Sony Pictures Television.)
- Great Scott! (1992) (with Claverly One Productions)
- Thea (1993–1994)
- The Second Half (1993–1994)
- 704 Hauser (1994, pilot only)
- The Lazarus Man (1996)
- Boston Common (1996–1997) (with KoMut Entertainment)
- You're the One (1998)
- Reunited (1998)
- The Army Show (1998)
- Mission Hill (1999–2002) (with Film Roman & Bill Oakley/Josh Weinstein Productions)
- Movie Stars (1999)
- The Michael Richards Show (2000–2001)
- Zero Effect (2001, pilot) (with Warner Bros. Television)
- Lucky (2003)

==== New Line Television ====
Title	Genre	Years	Network	Notes
Freddy's Nightmares	Anthology	1988–1990	Syndication	co-production with Lorimar Television and Stone Television
Court TV: Inside America's Courts		1993–1996	TBS/Syndication	co-production with Court TV; Currently owned by the E. W. Scripps Company
The Mask	Superhero	1995–1997	CBS	co-production with Dark Horse Entertainment, Film Roman and Sunbow Entertainment
Dumb and Dumber	Animated series	1995	ABC	co-production with Hanna-Barbera
Mortal Kombat: Defenders of the Realm	Animated series	1996	USA Network	co-production with Film Roman, Threshold Entertainment and USA Studios; Currently owned by Starz Distribution
Mortal Kombat: Konquest	Martial arts	1998–2000	TNT	co-production with Threshold Entertainment
Sir Arthur Conan Doyle's The Lost World	Action	1999–2002	TNT (1999) (pilot only); PPV/DirecTV/Syndication	co-production with Telescene (seasons 1–2), St. Clare Entertainment (seasons 1–2), Coote-Hayes Productions, Action Adventure Network (seasons 1–2) and The Over the Hill Gang Productions (season 3); Currently distributed by Multicom Entertainment Group
Breaking News	Drama	2002	Bravo	co-production with Trilogy Entertainment Group
The Twilight Zone	Fantasy	2002–2003	UPN	co-production with Spirit Dance Entertainment, Trilogy Entertainment Group and Joshmax Production Services
Masterminds	Documentary	2003–2007	History	
Amish in the City	Reality	2004	UPN	co-production with Stick Figures Productions
Kitchen Confidential	Sitcom	2005	Fox	co-production with 20th Century Fox Television, Hemingson Entertainment and Darren Star Productions
Blade: The Series	Superhero	2006	Spike	with Marvel Entertainment and Phantom Four Films
The Real Wedding Crashers	Comedy	2007	NBC	with Katalyst Films
Friday: The Animated Series	Animated series	2007	MTV2	co-production with MTV Animation and Cube Vision; Rights held by New Line's sister studio Paramount Television Studios
High School Confidential	Documentary	2008	We TV	
Family Foreman	Reality	2008	TV Land	

==== Home Box Office, Inc. ====
Title	Years	Network	Co-production with
HBO World Championship Boxing	1973–2018	HBO	
On Location	1975–1986	HBO	
Inside the NFL	1977–2008	HBO	NFL Films
Standing Room Only	1976–1982	HBO	
Race for the Pennant	1978–1992	HBO	
HBO Sneak Preview	1980–1983	HBO	
HBO Magazine	1982–1983	HBO	
Cinemax Screening Room	1982–1983	HBO	
Time Was	1982	HBO	
HBO Coming Attractions	1983–1985	HBO	
Braingames	1983–1985	HBO	
The Hitchhiker	1983–1991	HBO	
HBO Mailbox	1984–1985	HBO	
Vietnam War Story	1987–1988	HBO	
Tanner '88	1988	HBO	
One Night Stand	1989–2005	HBO	
Tales from the Crypt	1989–1996	HBO	Tales from the Crypt Holdings
Real Sex	1990–2009	HBO	
Sessions	1991	HBO	Castle Rock Entertainment
Erotic Confessions	1992–1996	Cinemax	
Def Comedy Jam	1992–1997	HBO	
Hardcore TV	1993–1994	HBO	
HBO Comedy Half-Hour	1994–1998	HBO	
Autopsy	1994–2008	HBO	
Taxicab Confessions	1995–2006	HBO	
Hot Line	1995–1996	Cinemax	Magic Hour Pictures
Real Sports with Bryant Gumbel	1995–2023	HBO	HBO Sports
Happily Ever After: Fairy Tales for Every Child	1995–2000	HBO	Hyperion Animation, Two Oceans Entertainment Group and Confetti Entertainment Company
Arli$$	1996–2003	HBO	Tollin/Robbins Productions
Boxing After Dark	1996–2018	HBO	
The High Life	1996	HBO	Worldwide Pants
The Chris Rock Show	1997–2000	HBO	CR Productions, Inc., 3 Arts Entertainment and HBO Downtown Productions
Reverb	1997–2001	HBO	
Todd McFarlane's Spawn	1997–1999	HBO	HBO Animation and Todd McFarlane Entertainment
Spicy City	1997	HBO	HBO Animation
Oz	1997–2003	HBO	The Levinson/Fontana Company, Viacom Productions and Rysher Entertainment
Tenacious D	1997–2000	HBO	Dakota North Entertainment
From the Earth to the Moon	1998	HBO	
Sex and the City	1998–2004	HBO	Darren Star Productions
The Sopranos	1999–2007	HBO	Chase Films and Brad Grey Television
30 by 30: Kid Flicks	1999–2001	HBO	
A Little Curious	1999–2000	HBO	Curious Pictures
Crashbox	1999–2000	HBO	Planet Grande Productions and Cuppa Coffee Animation
Nightcap	1999	Cinemax	
The Pleasure Zone	1999	Cinemax	MRG Entertainment
Bedtime Stories	2000	Cinemax	MRG Entertainment
Passion Cove	2000–2001	Cinemax	Alta Loma Entertainment
Thrills	2001	Cinemax	Advanced Media Entertainment
The Corner	2000	HBO	Blown Deadline Productions and Knee Deep Productions
KO Nation	2000–2001	HBO	
G String Divas	2000	HBO	
Curb Your Enthusiasm	2000–2024	HBO	
On the Record with Bob Costas	2001–2004	HBO	
Six Feet Under	2001–2005	HBO	Actual Size Films and The Greenblatt/Janollari Studio
Hard Knocks	2001–present	HBO	HBO Sports and NFL Films
Kindergarten	2001	HBO	Parallel Pictures & Television
Freshman Year	2001	HBO	Planet Grande Productions
Band of Brothers	2001	HBO	Playtone and DreamWorks Television
The Mind of the Married Man	2001–2002	HBO	Comedy Arts Studios, 3 Arts Entertainment and Sunlight Productions
Project Greenlight	2001–2015	HBO	
Def Poetry Jam	2002–2007	HBO	
The Best Sex Ever	2002–2003	Cinemax	MRG Entertainment
Hotel Erotica	2002–2003	Cinemax	Blue Hotel Productions
The Wire	2002–2008	HBO	Blown Deadline Productions
El Perro y El Gato	2003–2012	HBO	Primal Screen
Real Time with Bill Maher	2003–present	HBO	Brad Grey Television and Bill Maher Productions
Carnivàle	2003–2005	HBO	3 Arts Entertainment and Twilight Time Films (pilot)
K Street	2003	HBO	Interface Media Group
Da Ali G Show	2003–2004	HBO	
Deadwood	2004–2006	HBO	Roscoe Productions, Red Board Productions and Paramount Network Television
Black Tie Nights; Hollywood Sexcapades	2004–2005	Cinemax	Black Tie Films and POV Pictures
Entourage	2004–2011	HBO	Leverage Entertainment, Closest to the Hole Productions and Fly the Coop Entertainment (season 8)
Family Bonds	2004	HBO	
Pornucopia	2004	HBO	
Unscripted	2005	HBO	Section Eight Productions and Warner Bros. Television
Sex Games: Vegas; Sex Games: Cancún	2005–2006	Cinemax	MRG Entertainment
Costas Now	2005–2009	HBO	
Classical Baby	2005–2027	HBO	Poetry Foundation
The Comeback	2005–2014	HBO	Is or Isn't Entertainment, Working Class Films and Warner Bros. Television
Cathouse: The Series	2005–2014	HBO	
Rome	2005–2007	HBO; BBC Two; Rai 2	HD Vision Pictures
Elizabeth I	2005	HBO; Channel 4	co-production with HBO Films and Company Pictures
Hotel Erotica Cabo	2006	Cinemax	OronaFilm
Big Love	2006–2011	HBO	Anima Sola Productions and Playtone
Lucky Louie	2006	HBO	Circus King, 3 Arts Entertainment, Snowpants Productions and HBO Independent Productions
John from Cincinnati	2007	HBO	Red Board Productions and Saticoy Productions
Tell Me You Love Me	2007	HBO	O&M / ANN SJM Productions and Pariah
The Erotic Traveler	2007	Cinemax	
Sin City Diaries	2007	Cinemax	
Co-Ed Confidential	2007–2010	Cinemax	MRG Entertainment
Flight of the Conchords	2007–2009	HBO	Dakota Pictures
In Treatment	2008–2021	HBO	Leverage Entertainment, Closest to the Hole Productions and Sheleg
John Adams	2008	HBO	High Noon Productions, Playtone and Mid Atlantic Films
Generation Kill	2008	HBO	Company Pictures and Blown Deadline Productions
House of Saddam	2008	BBC Two; HBO	BBC
True Blood	2008–2014	HBO	Your Face Goes Here Entertainment
Little Britain USA	2008	HBO	19 Entertainment and Reveille Productions
The Life & Times of Tim	2008–2012	HBO	Warner Bros. Television, Insane Loon Productions and Media Rights Capital (owner)
Zane's Sex Chronicles	2008–2010	Cinemax	The Company Pictures
Forbidden Science	2009	Cinemax	Dangerous Tomorrows, Inc.
Lingerie	2009–2010	Cinemax	American Cinema Group
Life on Top	2009–2011	Cinemax	Lott Productions
Eastbound & Down	2009–2013	HBO	Gary Sanchez Productions, Rough House Pictures and Enemy MIGs Productions
Brave New Voices	2009–2010	HBO	
Hung	2009–2011	HBO	Tennessee Wolf Pack and Entertainment One
Bored to Death	2009–2011	HBO	Dakota Pictures, 3 Arts Entertainment and Fair Harbour Productions
The Neistat Brothers	2010	HBO	
How to Make It in America	2010–2011	HBO	Leverage Entertainment, Closest to the Hole Productions and Big Meyer
Funny or Die Presents	2010–2011	HBO	Funny or Die, Gary Sanchez Productions and Apatow Productions
The Ricky Gervais Show	2010–2012	HBO; Channel 4/E4	WildBrain Entertainment and Media Rights Capital (owner)
The Pacific	2010	HBO	DreamWorks Television and Playtone
Treme	2010–2013	HBO	Blown Deadline Productions
Boardwalk Empire	2010–2014	HBO	Leverage Entertainment, Closest to the Hole Productions, Sikelia Productions and Cold Front Productions
Mildred Pierce	2011	HBO	Kilter Films, John Wells Productions and MGM Television
Femme Fatales	2011–2012	Cinemax	Four Amigos Entertainment and Radioactive Fishtank
Skin to the Max	2011–2012	Cinemax	Stick Figure Productions
Chemistry	2011	Cinemax	Ostar Productions
Enlightened	2011–2013	HBO	Rip Cord Productions
Luck	2011–2012	HBO	
Strike Back	2011–2020	Cinemax; Sky One	Left Bank Pictures
Game of Thrones	2011–2019	HBO	Television 360, Grok! Television, Generator Entertainment, Startling Television and Bighead Littlehead
On Freddie Roach	2012	HBO	
The Girl's Guide to Depravity	2012–2013	Cinemax	
Girls	2012–2017	HBO	Apatow Productions and I Am Jenni Konner Productions
Veep	2012–2019	HBO	Dundee Productions
The Newsroom	2012–2014	HBO	
Banshee	2013–2016	Cinemax	Your Face Goes Here Entertainment, Tropper Schicker Productions and One Olive
Working Girls in Bed	2013	Cinemax	
Zane's The Jump Off	2013	Cinemax	Planet Zane Productions and MRG Entertainment
Vice	2013–2019	HBO	Bill Maher Productions and Vice Media
Hello Ladies	2013–2014	HBO	Four Eyes Entertainment, Quantity Entertainment and ABC Studios
Getting On	2013–2015	HBO	Anima Sola Productions and BBC Worldwide Productions
True Detective	2014–present	HBO	Anonymous Content, Parliament of Owls, Passenger and Neon Black
Looking	2014–2016	HBO	Fair Harbor Productions
Topless Prophet	2014	Cinemax	Pilgrim Studios
Olive Kitteridge	2014	HBO	Playtone and As Is
Silicon Valley	2014–2019	HBO	Judgemental Films Alec Berg Inc., Altschuler Krinsky Works and 3 Arts Entertainment
Last Week Tonight with John Oliver	2014–present	HBO	Avalon Television and Partially Important Productions
The Knick	2014–2018	Cinemax	AMBEG Screen Products, Anonymous Content and Extension 765
Togetherness	2015–2016	HBO	Duplass Brothers Productions
The Jinx	2015	HBO	HBO Documentary Films, Blumhouse Television and Hit the Ground Running
The Brink	2015	HBO	Jerry Weintraub Productions, Everyman Pictures and Little City Iron Works
Ballers	2015–2019	HBO	Seven Bucks Productions, Leverage Entertainment, Closest to the Hole Productions and Film 44
Show Me a Hero	2015	HBO	HBO Miniseries, Blown Deadline Productions and Pretty Pictures
J. Cole: Road to Homecoming	2015–2016	HBO	Dreamville Films
Animals	2016–2018	HBO	Karen BBQ, Duplass Brothers Productions and Starburns Industries
Vinyl	2016	HBO	Paramount Television, Jagged Productions, Sikelia Productions and Cold Front Productions
After the Thrones	2016	HBO	The Ring
Any Given Wednesday with Bill Simmons	2016	HBO	
The Night Of	2016	HBO	BBC Worldwide Productions, Bad Wolf and Film Rites
Vice Principals	2016–2017	HBO	Rough House Pictures
Quarry	2016	Cinemax	Anonymous Content, Night Sky Productions and One Olive
Divorce	2016–2019	HBO	Pretty Matches Productions, Merman, Kapital Entertainment,
Insecure	2016–2021	HBO	Hoorae Media, Penny for your Thoughts Entertainment and 3 Arts Entertainment
Big Little Lies	2017–2019	HBO	Crazyrose, David E Kelley Productions, Hello Sunshine, Blossom Films
Crashing	2017–2019	HBO	Joy Quota and Apatow Productions
The Defiant Ones	2017	HBO	Silverback 5150 Pictures and Alcon Entertainment
Room 104	2017–2020	HBO	Duplass Brothers Productions
The Deuce	2017–2019	HBO	Blown Deadline Productions, Rabbit Bandini Productions and Spartan Productions
Mike Judge Presents: Tales from the Tour Bus	2017–2018	Cinemax	Judgmental Films, Zipper Bros. Films, Sutter Road Picture Co. and Diamond Docs
2 Dope Queens	2018–2019	HBO	
Barry	2018–2023	HBO	Alec Berg Inc. and Hanarply
Here and Now	2018	HBO	Your Face Goes Here Entertainment
Sharp Objects	2018	HBO	Crazyrose, Fourth Born, Blumhouse Television, Tiny Pyro and Entertainment One
Random Acts of Flyness	2018–2022	HBO	MVMT and A24
Wyatt Cenac's Problem Areas	2018–2019	HBO	Amalgalmated Bear, Sixteen String Jack Productions and Avalon Television
Succession	2018–2023	HBO	Gary Sanchez Productions, Hyperobject Industries and Project Zeus
The Shop	2018–2025	HBO	
Camping	2018	HBO	
Elvis Presley: The Searcher	2018	HBO	HBO Documentary Films
Being Serena	2018	HBO	
Axios on HBO	2018–present	HBO	HBO Documentary Films, Axios Media and Downtown Community Television Center
The Case Against Adnan Syed	2019	HBO	HBO Documentary Films, NBCUniversal International Studios, Working Title Television, Instinct Productions and Disarming Films
Warrior	2019–2023	Cinemax/Max	Tropper Ink Productions, Perfect Storm Entertainment and Bruce Lee Entertainment
Chernobyl	2019	HBO; Sky Atlantic	HBO Miniseries, Sky UK, Sister Pictures, The Mighty Mint, and Word Games
Los Espookys	2019–2022	HBO	Broadway Video, Más Mejor, Antigravico, Fabula
Euphoria	2019–2026	HBO	The Reasonable Branch, A24, Little Lamb, DreamCrew, ADD Content Agency, Hot and Tedy Productions
A Black Lady Sketch Show	2019–2023	HBO	For Better or Words Inc., Hoorae Media, Jax Media, 3 Arts Entertainment
The Righteous Gemstones	2019–2025	HBO	Rough House Pictures
His Dark Materials	2019–2022	HBO; BBC One	Bad Wolf and New Line Cinema
The Outsider	2020	HBO	Aggregate Films, Temple Hill Entertainment, Pieface Inc., Civic Center Media and MRC
Avenue 5	2020–2022	HBO	Dundee Productions
McMillions	2020	HBO	Unrealistic Ideas and Fun Meter
The Plot Against America	2020	HBO	RK Films, Annapurna Television and Blown Deadline Productions
Run	2020	HBO	DryWrite, Wild Swim and Entertainment One
We're Here	2020–2024	HBO	House of Opus 20 and The Intellectual Property Corporation
Betty	2020–2021	HBO	A Dreamy Crystal Moselle Sequence..., Arfin Material (season 1) and Untitled Entertainment
I May Destroy You	2020	HBO; BBC One	Various Artists Limited and FALKINA Productions
Perry Mason	2020–2023	HBO	Dwight Street Book Club, Inflatable Mouse and Team Downey
I'll Be Gone in the Dark	2020–2021	HBO	HBO Documentary Films and Story Syndicate
The Vow	2020–2022	HBO	HBO Documentary Films and The Othrs
The Third Day	2020	HBO; Sky Atlantic	Punchdrunk International, Plan B Entertainment, Scott Free Productions and Sky Studios
Agents of Chaos	2020	HBO	HBO Documentary Films, Jigsaw Productions and Investigate Studios
How To with John Wilson	2020–2023	HBO	Blow Out Productions and John's Movies
Industry	2020–present	HBO; BBC Two	Bad Wolf
Tiger	2021	HBO	HBO Sports, Jigsaw Productions and Our Time Projects
Painting with John	2021–2023	HBO	Hyperobject Industries
The Lady and the Dale	2021	HBO	HBO Documentary Films, Duplass Brothers Productions and Cinemation Studios
Allen v. Farrow	2021	HBO	HBO Documentary Films, Impact Partners, Jane Doe Films, Chicago Media Project, Artemis Rising Foundation and The Lozen Foundation
Q Into the Storm	2021	HBO	HBO Documentary Films, Hyperobject Industries and Hyrax Films
Exterminate All the Brutes	2021	HBO; Sky Documentaries	HBO Documentary Films, Velvet Film, Sky Documentaries and ARTE France
The Nevers	2021	HBO	Mutant Enemy Productions
Pray, Obey, Kill	2021	HBO	HBO Documentary Films, HBO Europe and Warner Bros. International Television Production
Pause with Sam Jay	2021–2022	HBO	Donna's Daughter, A Penny for Your Thoughts, Avalon Television and Art & Industry
The White Lotus	2021–present	HBO	Pallogram, The District and Rip Cord Productions
Catch and Kill: The Podcast Tapes	2021	HBO	HBO Documentary Films and World of Wonder
100 Foot Wave	2021–present	HBO	Topic Studios, Amplify Pictures, Library Films, React Films and Cinetic Media
Small Town News: KPVM Pahrump	2021	HBO	HBO Documentary Films and World of Wonder
Obama: In Pursuit of a More Perfect Union	2021	HBO	HBO Documentary Films and Kunhardt Films
NYC Epicenters 9/11→2021½	2021	HBO	HBO Documentary Films and 40 Acres and a Mule Filmworks
Level Playing Field	2021	HBO	HBO Sports and Vox Media Studios
Nuclear Family	2021	HBO	HBO Documentary Films, Story Syndicate, Topic Studios, Impact Partners, Big Beach, Sustainable Films and Bunker
Landscapers	2021	HBO; Sky Atlantic	Sky Studios, Sister Pictures and South of the River Pictures
And Just Like That...	2021–2025	Max	Michael Patrick King Productions, Pretty Matches Productions and Rialto Films
The Gilded Age	2022–present	HBO	Universal Television and Neamo Film and Television
Somebody Somewhere	2022–2024	HBO	Duplass Brothers Productions and The Mighty Mint
Winning Time: The Rise of the Lakers Dynasty	2022–2023	HBO	Jim Hecht Productions, Jason Shuman Productions, Steeplechase Amusements and Hyperobject Industries
The Invisible Pilot	2022	HBO	
We Own This City	2022	HBO	Spartan Productions and Blown Deadline Productions
The Baby	2022	HBO	Proverbial Pictures, Sky Studios and Sister
The Time Traveler's Wife	2022	HBO	Hartswood Films, Warner Bros. Television and New Line Cinema
Irma Vep	2022	HBO; OCS City	A24, Vortex Sutra, The Reasonable Bunch and Little Lamb
Mind Over Murder	2022	HBO	HBO Documentary Films, Vox Media Studios, Little Horse Crossing the River and Truth.Media
The Anarchists	2022	HBO	HBO Documentary Films, Blumhouse Television and Bird Murmur
The Rehearsal	2022–present	HBO	Blow Out Productions
House of the Dragon	2022–present	HBO	GRRM, Basford Sword and 1:26 Pictures Inc.
The Last of Us	2023−present	HBO	Sony Pictures Television, PlayStation Productions, Naughty Dog, The Mighty Mint and Word Games
White House Plumbers	2023	HBO	Fearless Films, Hot Seat Productions, Perfect Pleasant Productions, wiip, The District and Crash&Salvage
The Idol	2023	HBO	A24, Bron, Little Lamb, The Reasonable Bunch, Manic Phase and People Pleaser
Jerrod Carmichael Reality Show	2024	HBO	Morningside Entertainment and Edgeline Films
Fantasmas	2024	HBO	Irony Point, Frut Tree and 3 Arts Entertainment
Dune: Prophecy	2024–present	HBO	Wandering Jew Productions, Herbert Properties, Inc., Flying Life and Legendary Television
Rooster	2026–present	HBO	Warner Bros. Television and Doozer Productions
Harry Potter	2027–present	HBO	HBO, Heyday Films, Warner Bros. Television and Brontë Film and TV
Six Feet Under Follow-Up	TBA	HBO	

===== HBO Documentary Films =====
Title	Years	Network	Notes
Saving My Tomorrow	2014–2017	HBO	co-production with HBO Entertainment
The Jinx	2015	HBO	co-production with HBO Entertainment, Blumhouse Television and Hit the Ground Running
The Zen Diaries of Garry Shandling	2018	HBO	co-production with HBO Entertainment, Apatow Productions and RadicalMedia
Axios on HBO	2018–present	HBO	co-production with HBO Entertainment, Axios Media and Downtown Community Television Center
The Case Against Adnan Syed	2019	HBO	co-production with HBO Entertainment, NBCUniversal International Studios, Working Title Television, Instinct Productions and Disarming Films
I'll Be Gone in the Dark	2020–2021	HBO	co-production with HBO Entertainment and Story Syndicate
The Vow	2020–2022	HBO	co-production with HBO Entertainment and The Othrs
Agent of Chaos	2020	HBO	co-production with HBO Entertainment, Jigsaw Productions and Investigate Studios
The Lady and the Dale	2021	HBO	co-production with HBO Entertainment, Duplass Brothers Productions and Cinemation Studios
Allen v. Farrow	2021	HBO	co-production with HBO Entertainment, Impact Partners, Jane Doe Films, Chicago Media Project, Artemis Rising Foundation and The Rozen Foundation
Q Into the Storm	2021	HBO	co-production with HBO Entertainment, Hyperobject Industries and Hyrax Films
Exterminate All the Brutes	2021	HBO; Sky Documentaries	co-production with HBO Entertainment, Velvet Film, Sky Documentaries and ARTE France
Pray, Obey, Kill	2021	HBO	co-production with HBO Entertainment, HBO Europe and Warner Bros. ITVP Sweden
Catch and Kill: The Podcast Tapes	2021	HBO	co-production with HBO Entertainment and World of Wonder
Small Town News: KPVM Pahrump	2021	HBO	co-production with HBO Entertainment and World of Wonder
Obama: In Pursuit of a More Perfect Union	2021	HBO	co-production with HBO Entertainment and Kunhardt Films
NYC Epicenters 9/11→2021½	2021	HBO	co-production with HBO Entertainment and 40 Acres and a Mule Filmworks
Nuclear Family	2021	HBO	co-production with HBO Entertainment, Story Syndicate, Topic Studios, Impact Partners, Big Beach, Sustainable Films and Bunker
Phoenix Rising	2022	HBO	co-production with HBO Entertainment, Disarming Films and The Artemis Rising Foundation
Mind Over Murder	2022	HBO	co-production with HBO Entertainment, Vox Media Studios, Little Horse Crossing the River and Truth.Media
The Anarchists	2022	HBO	co-production with HBO Entertainment, Blumhouse Television and Bird Murmur

===== HBO Europe =====
Title	Years	Network	Co-production with
Terapie	2011–2019	HBO Europe	
Umbre	2014–present	HBO Europe	
The Silent Valley	2016	HBO Europe	
Hackerville	2018	HBO Europe; TNT Serie	
The Pioneer	2019	HBO Europe	
30 Coins	2020–2023	HBO Europe	Pokeepsie Films
Pray, Obey, Kill	2021	HBO	HBO Entertainment, HBO Documentary Films and Warner Bros. ITVP Sweden
The Informant	2022–present	HBO Max	

===== HBO Downtown Productions =====
Title	Years	Network	Notes
Night After Night with Allan Havey	1989–1992	The Comedy Channel; Comedy Central	
Short Attention Span Theater	1989–1994	The Comedy Channel; Comedy Central	
Sports Monster	1991	The Comedy Channel; Comedy Central	
Stand Up, Stand Up	1991–1992	Comedy Central	
Inside the NFL	1992	HBO	co-production with NFL Films
Women Aloud	1992–1993	Comedy Central	co-production with Comedy Partners
Mystery Science Theater 3000	1992–1996	Comedy Central	co-production with Best Brains; Currently owned by Shout! Factory
2 Drink Minimum	1993–1994	Comedy Central	co-production with Comedy Partners
Politically Incorrect	1993–2002	Comedy Central; ABC	co-production with Comedy Partners
Dr. Katz, Professional Therapist	1995–2002	Comedy Central	co-production with Tom Snyder Productions, Popular Arts Entertainment and Comedy Partners
Exit 57	1995–1996	Comedy Central	co-production with Comedy Partners
The Chris Rock Show	1997–2000	HBO	co-production with HBO Entertainment, 3 Arts Entertainment and CR Enterprises, Inc.

===== HBO Independent Productions =====
Title	Years	Network	Notes
Roc	1991–1994	Fox	
The Paula Poundstone Show	1992	HBO	co-production with Morra, Brezner & Steinberg Entertainment, Inc.
Down the Shore	1992	Fox	co-production with Caravan Entertainment and 3 Arts Entertainment
Martin	1992–1997	Fox	co-production with You Go Boy! Productions (seasons 3–5)
Laurel Avenue	1993	HBO	mini-series; co-production with Elsboy Entertainment
Daddy Dearest	1993	Fox	co-production with Van Zandt/Milmore Productions and 3 Arts Entertainment
Get Smart	1995	Fox	co-production with Columbia Pictures Television (Note: Distributed by Sony Pictures Television; HBO owns the program's copyrights.)
House of Buggin'	1995	Fox	co-production with Bregman/Baer Productions
The Last Frontier	1996	Fox	
Everybody Loves Raymond (Note: Distributed in syndication by CBS Television Distribution; HBO owns the program's copyrights.)	1996–2005	CBS	co-production with Where's Lunch and Worldwide Pants Incorporated
The Jury	2004	Fox	co-production with The Levinson/Fontana Company, MarlJim Productions and 20th Century Fox Television
Lucky Louie	2006	HBO	co-production with HBO Entertainment, Circus King, 3 Arts Entertainment and Snowpants Productions

===== Time-Life Television =====
Title	Years	Network	Notes
Wild, Wild World of Animals	1973–1978	Syndication	
Harold Lloyd's World of Comedy	1974	Syndication	
World War II: G.I. Diary	1978–1979	Syndication	
The Africans	1978	Nine Network	co-production with Nine Network and Meredith Broadcasting
Blind Ambition	1979	CBS	
Wilderness Alive	1979	Syndication	miniseries
The Search for Alexander the Great	1981	PBS	co-production with VideoArts TV

====== Talent Associates ======
Title	Years	Network	Notes
East Side/West Side	1963–1964	CBS	co-production with United Artists Television; Currently distributed by MGM Television
Get Smart	1965–1970	NBC/CBS	
The Hero	1966	NBC	
N.Y.P.D.	1967–1969	ABC	
Diana	1973–1974	NBC	
Eleanor and Franklin	1976	ABC	mini-series

== Warner Bros. Discovery Global Linear Networks ==
Title	Years	Network	Note
The Do-It-Yourself Show	1984–1985	Syndication	produced by Do It Yourself, Inc. Rights purchased by Scripps Productions in 1998
Club Dance	1991–1999	TNN	produced by Cinetel Productions
Shadetree Mechanic	1992–2000	TNN	produced by Cinetel Productions

=== Discovery Family ===
Title	Years	Network	Co-production with
Mega Movie Magic	1997–2000	Discovery Channel	GRB Entertainment
Jaws & Claws	1997–1998	Discovery Channel	
Ultimate Guide to the Awesome	2001–2004	Discovery Kids	
Truth or Scare	2001–2003	Discovery Kids	44 Blue Productions
Endurance	2002–2008	Discovery Kids	3Ball Productions
Adventure Camp	2003; 2008	Discovery Kids	
Zack's Ultimate Guide	2003	Discovery Kids	
Kenny the Shark	2003–2005	Discovery Kids	Phase 4 and Hong Ying Universe Company Limited
Jeff Corwin Unleashed	2003–2004	Discovery Kids	
Trading Spaces: Boys vs. Girls	2003–2005	Discovery Kids	

=== TBS ===
Title	Years	Network	Co-producer	Notes
Superstation Funtime	1980–1982	Superstation WTBS		
Tush	1980–1981	Superstation WTBS		
Safe at Home	1985–1987	Superstation WTBS	The Arthur Company	
Rocky Road	1985–1987	Superstation WTBS	The Arthur Company	
Cousteau's Rediscovery of the World	1986–1996	TBS/Syndication	The Cousteau Society, Inc.	
Feed Your Mind	1994–1998	TBS		
Dinner and a Movie	1995–2011	TBS		
Network Earth	1996	TBS		
TOPX	1996–1998	TBS		
Wildlife Adventures	1997–2000	TBS		
Interact Atlanta	1999–2003	TBS		
Family Affair	2002–2003	The WB	Pariah Films and Turner Television	
The O'Keefes	2003	The WB	Hamcat Productions	
Movie and a Makeover	2003–2011	TBS		
The Bill Engvall Show	2007–2009	TBS	Welladay, Inc. (season 1) and Parallel Entertainment	
JJ on Atlanta	2007–2011	WPCH-TV		
Frank TV	2007–2008	TBS		
King of the Nerds	2013–2015	TBS	Electus and 5x5 Media	
Bam's Bad Ass Game Show	2014	TBS	Bill's Market & Television Productions	
The Last Ship	2014–2018	TNT	Channel Road Productions and Platinum Dunes	
CeeLo Green's The Good Life	2014	TBS	Emerald TV Productions and Rogue Atlas Productions	
Meet the Smiths	2015	TBS	Good Clean Fun	
Clipped	2015	TBS	KoMut Entertainment	
Angie Tribeca	2016–2018	TBS	Carousel Productions and 301 Productions	
Full Frontal with Samantha Bee	2016–2022	TBS	Randy & Pam's Quality Entertainment and Jax Media	
The Detour	2016–2019	TBS	Randy & Pam's Quality Entertainment (season 2), Jax Media (season 2), Studio T (seasons 2-3) and Nomadic Pictures (season 3)	
Search Party	2016–2022	TBS/HBO Max	Jax Media, Quiet and Considerate Productions and Semi-Formal Productions, Inc.	
Wrecked	2016–2018	TBS	Shipley & Shipley Productions	
The Joker's Wild	2017–2019	TBS	Sony Pictures Television, Snoopadelic Films, SMAC Entertainment	
The Guest Book	2017–2018	TBS	Amigos De Garcia Productions and CBS Television Studios	
Tarantula	2017	TBS	Rough Draft Studios, Rough House Pictures and Solid Bass	
Final Space	2018–2021	TBS/Adult Swim	Conaco, ShadowMachine, Jam Filled Entertainment, Star Cadet and New Form Digital	
The Last O.G.	2018–2021	TBS	Streetlife Productions Inc., Monkeypaw Productions, Full Flavor (season 1), Matthew 633 (season 2), The Tannenbaum Company and Artists First	
Miracle Workers	2019–2023	TBS	Broadway Video, Allagash Industries and FX Productions	
The Misery Index	2019–2021	TBS	Grandma's House Entertainment, Andy Breckman Productions and 3 Arts Entertainment	
It's Personal with Amy Hoggart	2020	TruTV	Randy & Pam's Quality Entertainment and Jax Media	
Shaq Life	2020–2021	TNT		
Celebrity Show-Off	2020	TBS	Critical Content	
Close Enough	2020–2022	HBO Max	Cartoon Network Studios	
Lost Resort	2020	TBS		
Stylish with Jenna Lyons	2020	HBO Max	Our House Media	
Go-Big Show	2021–2022	TBS	Propagate Content, Matador Content and Snoopadelic Films	
Tell Me Your Secrets	2021	Amazon Prime Video	Made Up Stories and Amazon Studios	
Friday Night Vibes	2021–present	TBS		
Chad	2021–2024	Shawdi Productions, Nomadic Pictures and 3 Arts Entertainment	Originally ordered at Fox	
The Cube	2021–present	TBS		
Rat in the Kitchen	2022	TBS		
I Survived Bear Grylls	2023–present	TBS		

==== TNT Originals ====
Title	Years	Network	Co-producer(s)
Rough Cut	1997–1998	TNT	
Men of a Certain Age	2009–2011	TNT	Snowpants Productions and Papa Al Productions
Wedding Day	2009	TNT	
Falling Skies	2011–2015	TNT	DreamWorks Television/Amblin Television and Invasion Productions
Boston's Finest	2013–2014	TNT	Donnie D. Productions and Jarrett Creative Group
72 Hours	2013	TNT	Lighthearted Entertainment
The Hero	2013	TNT	Electus, 5x5 Media and 7 Bucks Entertainment
Mob City	2013	TNT	Darkwoods Productions, Swiftly Productions and Michael DeLuca Productions
Monday Mornings	2013	TNT	David E. Kelley Productions
APB with Troy Dunn	2014	TNT	
Inside Job	2014	TNT	All3Media America and Studio Lambert
Save Our Business	2014	TNT	
Murder in the First	2014–2016	TNT	Steven Bochco Productions and Shoe Money Productions
The Last Ship	2014–2018	TNT	Studio T, Channel Road Productions and Platinum Dunes
Agent X	2015	TNT	Beacon Pictures
Proof	2015	TNT	
Public Morals	2015	TNT	Amblin Television and Marlboro Road Gang Productions
Good Behaviour	2016–2017	TNT	Tomorrow Studios and Storyland
Will	2017	TNT	Monumental Television, Startling Television, Sir Weighty Tomes Enterprises
Claws	2017–2022	TNT	Le Train Train and Warner Horizon Television
The Alienist	2018–2020	TNT	Vanessa Productions, Ltd., Stuma Productions, Anonymous Content and Paramount Television
I Am the Night	2019	TNT	Jenkins+Pine Productions
Snowpiercer	2020–2025	TNT/AMC	Tomorrow Studios, Dog Fish Films and CJ Entertainment; Rights held by ITV Studios
Raised by Wolves	2020–2022	HBO Max	Film Afrika, Lit Entertainment, Shadycat Productions and Scott Free Productions
Rich & Shameless	2022	TNT	

==== TruTV ====
TruTV's pre-2008 original programming library is currently owned by the E. W. Scripps Company due to their acquisition of the CourtTV franchise since 2018.

Title	Years	Network	Notes
Crime Stories	1998–2010	TruTV	
I, Detective	2001–2006	TruTV	co-production with Michael Hoff Productions
Dominick Dunne's Power, Privilege, and Justice	2002–2009	TruTV	
Hot Pursuit	2002–2009	TruTV	
North Mission Road	2003–2007	TruTV	
Extreme Evidence	2003–2005	TruTV	
The Investigators	2004–2008	TruTV	
Psychic Detectives	2004–2008	TruTV	co-production with StoryHouse Productions
Haunting Evidence	2005–2008	TruTV	
Beach Patrol	2006–2008	TruTV	
Most Shocking	2006–2010	TruTV	co-production with Nash Entertainment
Disorder in the Court	2006–2011	TruTV	
Suburban Secrets	2007–2008	TruTV	
Ocean Force	2007–2009	TruTV	
Speeders	2007–2009	TruTV	co-production with Zoo Productions
Party Heat	2007–2010	TruTV	
Bait Car	2007–2012	TruTV	co-production with KKI Productions
The Principal's Office	2008–2009	TruTV	
Speeders Fight Back	2008–2009	TruTV	
World's Wildest Vacation Videos	2008–2009	TruTV	
Rehab: Party at the Hard Rock Hotel	2008–2010	TruTV	
truTV Presents: World's Dumbest...	2008–2014	TruTV	co-production with Meetinghouse Productions
All Worked Up	2009–2011	TruTV	co-production with RDF USA
It Only Hurts When I Laugh!	2009–2011	TruTV	
Conspiracy Theory with Jesse Ventura	2009–2012	TruTV	co-production with A. Smith & Company Productions and Braverman Bloom
Full Throttle Saloon	2009–2014	TruTV	
Ma's Roadhouse	2010	TruTV	
Over the Limit	2010	TruTV	
Southern Fried Stings	2010–2011	TruTV	co-production with Zoo Productions and Studio Lambert
Hardcore Pawn	2010–2015	TruTV	co-production with Richard Dominick Productions and RDF USA / Zodiak USA
Bear Swamp Recovery	2011	TruTV	
Big Brian The Fortune Seller	2011	TruTV	
Storage Hunters	2011–2013	TruTV	co-production with T Group Productions and Hard Boiled Entertainment
Lizard Lick Towing	2011–2014	TruTV	co-production with Zodiak USA
South Beach Tow	2011–2014	TruTV	
Impractical Jokers	2011–present	TruTV	co-production with NorthSouth Productions
Caught Red Handed	2012–2013	TruTV	co-production with Nash Entertainment
Killer Karaoke	2012–2014	TruTV	co-production with Zodiak USA
Cash Dome	2013	TruTV	co-production with 51 Minds Entertainment
Container Wars	2013	TruTV	
Kentucky Bidders	July 8, 2013	TruTV	
Upload with Shaquille O'Neal	2013–2014	TruTV	
Top 20 Funniest/truTV Top Funniest	2013–2015	TruTV	
The Safecrackers	2014	TruTV	
The Carbonaro Effect	2014–2020	TruTV	co-production with Fields Entertainment and 11 Productions
Way Out West	2014–2015	TruTV	
Motor City Masters	2014	TruTV	
Barmageddon	2014–2015	TruTV	
Fake Off	2014–2015	TruTV	
Hair-Jacked	2014	TruTV	
How To Be A Grownup	2014–2015	TruTV	
Friends of the People	2014–2015	TruTV	co-production with C–Moose Productions, 3 Arts Entertainment and Marobru Productions
Branson Famous	2014–2015	TruTV	
Breaking Greenville	2015	TruTV	co-production with Electus
Hack My Life	2015–2018	TruTV	co-production with Truly Original and Sharp Entertainment
The Hustlers	2015	TruTV	co-production with Pilgrim Media Group
Kart Life	2015	TruTV	Bodega Pictures
Fameless	2015–2017	TruTV	co-production with Entertainment One and Electus
Six Degrees of Everything	2015	TruTV	co-production with Fine Brothers Entertainment and Marc Summers Productions
Adam Ruins Everything	2015–2019	TruTV	co-production with Big Breakfast and CollegeHumor
Billy on the Street	2015–2017	TruTV	co-production with Funny or Die
Almost Genius	2015–2016	TruTV	co-production with Meetinghouse Productions
10 Things	2016	TruTV	
Those Who Can't	2016	TruTV	co-production with 3 Arts Entertainment
truInside	2016	TruTV	
Rachel Dratch's Late Night Snack	2016–2018	TruTV	
Comedy Knockout	2016–2018	TruTV	
Greatest Ever	2016–2017	TruTV	
You Can Do Better	2016–2017	TruTV	
Jon Glaser Loves Gear	2016–2019	TruTV	co-production with PFFR and Unintelligible Grunt
Chris Webber's Full Court Pranks	2017	TruTV	co-production with Propagate Content
Talk Show the Game Show	2017–2018	TruTV	co-production with Push It Productions
I'm Sorry	2017–2019	TruTV	co-production with Pampelmpusse Productions, Kablamo! (season 1), A24 (season 2), Lonely Island Classics and Gloria Sanchez Productions
The Chris Gethard Show	2017–2018	TruTV	co-production with Funny or Die, AGI Entertainment and No Cool Kids
Impractical Jokers: Afterparty	2017–2019	TruTV	co-production with NorthSouth Productions
At Home with Amy Sedaris	2017–2020	TruTV	co-production with PFFR (season 1), A24 (seasons 2–3) and Buck Tooth Productions
Laff Mobb's Laff Tracks	2017–2020	TruTV	
Bobcat Goldthwait's Misfits & Monsters	2018	TruTV	co-production with Left/Right Productions
Paid Off with Michael Torpey	2018–2019	TruTV	
Tacoma FD	2019–2023	TruTV	co-production with 3 Arts Entertainment, Broken Lizard, Fat Man Little Boy, Silverscreen Pictures (seasons 1–2) and A24 (season 3)
Impractical Jokers: Dinner Party	2020–2021	TruTV	
Double Cross with Blake Griffin	2021	TruTV	co-production with Big Breakfast and Mortal Media
Big Trick Energy	2021	TruTV	Diga Studios
Backyard Bar Wars	2021	TruTV	

=== Super Deluxe ===
- Y'All So Stupid (2007–2008)
- Penelope Princess of Pets (2007–2008)
- Fark TV (2007–2008)
- Derek and Simon: The Show (2007–2008)
- Tim and Eric Nite Live! (2007–2008)
- Magic Funhouse! (2016–2017) (co-production with Fullscreen)
- This Close (2018–2019)
- Chambers (2019)

=== Achievement Hunter ===
- Pajamachievements (2008–2009)
- AHWU (2010–2021)
- Fails of the Week (2010–2016)
- Achievement HORSE (2010–2016)
- Rage Quit (2011–2019)

=== Funhaus ===
- Funhaus Podcast (2015–2023)
- Demo Disk (2015–2020)

=== ScrewAttack ===
- Death Battle (2010–present)

=== Fullscreen ===
- Electra Woman and Dyna Girl (2016)

=== TNT Sports ===
- Braves TBS Baseball (1973–2007)
- NASCAR on TBS (1983–2000)
- NBA on TBS (1984–2002)
- Inside the NBA (1984–present) (Has aired on ESPN and ABC since 2025)
- NBA on TNT (1989–2025)
- NFL on TNT (1990–1997)
- Olympics on TNT (1992, 1994, 1998) (co-production with CBS Sports)
- WCW Monday Nitro (1995–2001)
- Title Night (1998) (co-production with CBS Sports)
- Tennis on TNT (2000–2002, 2025–present)
- NASCAR on TNT (2001–2014, 2025–present)
- Major League Baseball on TBS (2007–present)
- NCAA March Madness (2011–present) (co-production with CBS Sports and National Collegiate Athletic Association)
- MetroPCS Friday Night Knockout (2015) (co-production with HBO and Top Rank)
- AEW Dynamite (2019–present)
- NHL on TNT (2021–present)

=== CNN Worldwide ===
Title	Years	Network	Notes
CNN Daybreak	1980–2005	CNN	
Evans, Novak, Hunt & Shields	1980–2002	CNN	
Freeman Reports	1980–1985	CNN	
Sports Tonight	1980–2002	CNN	
Style with Elsa Klensch	1980–2001	CNN	
Pinnacle	1982–2003	CNN	
Crossfire	1982–2005; 2013–2014	CNN	
Showbiz Today	1984–2001	CNN	
Inside Politics	1984–2005; 2014–present	CNN	
Larry King Live	1985–2010	CNN	
Capital Gang	1988–2005	CNN	
Both Sides with Jesse Jackson	1992–2000	CNN	
Reliable Sources	1992–2022	CNN	
Your Money	1992–2014	CNN	
CNN Presents	1993–2012	CNN	
Late Edition with Wolf Blitzer	1993–2009	CNN	
CNN World Sport	1993–present	CNN	
Talkback Live	1994–2003	CNN	
Diplomatic License	1994–2006	CNN	
CNN Millennium	1999	CNN	
Wolf Blitzer Reports	2000–2005	CNN	
CNN Tonight	2001–present	CNN	
American Morning	2001–2011	CNN	
CNN Live Today	2001–2006	CNN	
NewsNight with Aaron Brown	2001–2005	CNN	
People in the News	2001–2005	CNN	
Connie Chung Tonight	2002–2003	CNN	
Next@CNN	2002–2005	CNN	
Anderson Cooper 360°	2003–present	CNN	
CNN Today	2004–2019	CNN	
Showbiz Tonight	2005–2014	CNN	
Nancy Grace	2005–2016	CNN	
The Situation Room with Wolf Blitzer	2005–present	CNN	
CNN Newsroom	2006–present	CNN	
CNN Special Investigations Unit	2007	CNN	
Planet in Peril	2007–2008	CNN	
CNN Heroes	2007–present	CNN	
Campbell Brown	2008–2010	CNN	
Black in America	2008–2012	CNN	
Jane Velez-Mitchell	2008–2014	CNN	
Fareed Zakaria GPS	2008–present	CNN	
D. L. Hughley Breaks the News	2008–2009	CNN	
State of the Union	2009–present	CNN	
International Desk	2009–2019	CNN	
Your Bottom Line	2009–2010	CNN	
Amanpour	2009–2010, 2012–present	CNN	
John King, USA	2010–2012	CNN	
In the Arena	2010–2011	CNN	
Piers Morgan Live	2011–2014	CNN	
Erin Burnett OutFront	2011–present	CNN	
The Next List	2011–present	CNN	
CNN This Morning with Kasie Hunt	2012–present	CNN	Previously titled Early Start
Starting Point	2012–2013	CNN	
News Stream	2012–2018	CNN	
Anthony Bourdain: Parts Unknown	2013–2018	CNN	
The Lead with Jake Tapper	2013–present	CNN	
Legal View with Ashleigh Banfield	2013–2016	CNN	
Morgan Spurlock Inside Man	2013–2016	CNN	co-production with Warrior Poets
New Day	2013–2022	CNN	
Sanjay Gupta MD	2013–2014	CNN	
Around the World	2013–2014	CNN	formerly Newsroom International
AC360° Later	2013–2014	CNN	
At This Hour	2014–2023	CNN	
Room	2014–2018	CNN	
Chicagoland	2014	CNN	
Don Lemon Tonight	2014–2022	CNN	
The Sixties	2014	CNN	co-production with Playtone and Herzog & Company
The Hunt with John Walsh	2014–present	CNN	co-production with Zero Point Zero Production
This Is Life with Lisa Ling	2014–2022	CNN	
Smerconish	2014–present	CNN	
Somebody's Gotta Do It	2014–2018	CNN	co-production with Pilgrim Media Group
The Seventies	2015	CNN	co-production with Playtone and Herzog & Company
The Wonder List with Bill Weir	2015–2017; 2022	CNN/CNN+	
Race for the White House	2016–present	CNN	
The Eighties	2016	CNN	co-production with Playtone and Herzog & Company
United Shades of America	2016–2022	CNN	
Declassified	2016–2019	CNN	co-production with All3Media America
The History of Comedy	2017	CNN	
Cuomo Prime Time	2017–2021	CNN	
The 2000s	2018	CNN	co-production with Playtone and Herzog & Company
The Movies	2019	CNN	co-production with Playtone and Herzog & Company
Heaven's Gate: The Cult of Cults	2020	HBO Max	co-production with Campfire and Stitcher
Stanley Tucci: Searching for Italy	2021–2022	CNN	co-production with Raw TV
History of the Sitcom	2021	CNN	
CNN This Morning	2022–2024	CNN	
CNN This Morning Weekend	2022–present	CNN	
The 2010s	2023	CNN	Playtone and Herzog & Company
The Source with Kaitlan Collins	2023–present	CNN	

== Television films, miniseries and specials ==
=== Warner Bros. Discovery Streaming & Studios ===
==== Warner Bros. Television Studios ====
- Crosscurrent (1971)
- Probe (1972) (co-production with Leslie Stevens Productions)
- The Eyes of Charles Sand (1972)
- Climb An Angry Mountain (1972)
- Genesis II (1973) (co-production with Norway Productions)
- The Third Girl from the Left (1973)
- Deliver Us from Evil (1973)
- Cry Rape! (1973) (co-production with Leonard Freeman Productions)
- Key West (1973)
- Smile Jenny, You're Dead (1974)
- Wonder Woman (1974)
- Sidekicks (1974) (co-production with Cherokee Productions)
- Planet Earth (1974)
- The Healers (1974)
- The F.B.I. Story: The FBI Versus Alvin Karpis, Public Enemy Number One (1974) (co-production with Quinn Martin Productions)
- Attack on Terror: The FBI vs. the Ku Klux Klan (1975) (co-production with Quinn Martin Productions)
- Search for the Gods (1975) (co-production with The Douglas S. Cramer Company)
- Black Bart (1975)
- Death Among Friends (1975) (co-production with The Douglas S. Cramer Company)
- Strange New World (1975)
- Brinks: The Great Robbery (1976) (co-production with Quinn Martin Productions)
- Panache (1976)
- The Dark Side of Innocence (1976)
- Mayday at 40,000 Feet! (1976) (co-production with Andrew J. Fenady Productions)
- Bugs and Daffy's Carnival of the Animals (1976)
- Flood! (1976)
- The Possessed (1977)
- Fire! (1977) (co-production with Irwin Allen Productions)
- Bugs Bunny's Howl-oween Special (1977) (co-production with DePatie–Freleng Enterprises)
- Bugs Bunny in King Arthur's Court (1978) (co-production with Chuck Jones Productions)
- A Death in Canaan (1978) (co-production with Chris/Rose Productions)
- The Return of Captain Nemo (1978) (co-production with Irwin Allen Productions)
- The New Maverick (1978) (co-production with Cherokee Productions)
- Zuma Beach (1978) (co-production with Bruce Cohn Curtis Films Ltd. and Edgar J. Scherick Associates)
- Katie: Portrait of a Centerfold (1978) (co-production with Moonlight Productions)
- Thou Shalt Not Commit Adultery (1978) (co-production with Edgar J. Scherick Productions)
- How Bugs Bunny Won the West (1978)
- The Pirate (1978) (co-production with Howard W. Koch Productions)
- Someone's Watching Me! (1978)
- Champions: A Love Story (1979)
- The Corn Is Green (1979)
- Hanging by a Thread (1979) (co-production with Irwin Allen Productions)
- You Can't Take It with You (1979)
- Dummy (1979) (co-production with The Königsberg Company)
- Bugs Bunny's Thanksgiving Diet (1979)
- Friendships, Secrets and Lies (1979) (co-production with W/R – Wittman/Riche Productions)
- The Memory of Eva Ryker (1980) (co-production with Irwin Allen Productions)
- Haywire (1980) (co-production with Pando Productions)
- This Year's Blonde (1980)
- Daffy Duck's Easter Show (1980) (co-production with DePatie-Freleng Enterprises)
- Bugs Bunny's Bustin' Out All Over (1980) (co-production with Chuck Jones Enterprises)
- The Scarlett O'Hara War (1980) (co-production with David L. Wolper-Stan Margulies Productions)
- Fun and Games (1980) (co-production with The Kainn-Gallo Company)
- The Women's Room (1980)
- The Bugs Bunny Mystery Special (1980)
- Daffy Duck's Thanks-for-Giving Special (1980)
- Crazy Times (1981)
- Scruples (1981) (co-production with Lou Step Productions)
- Don't Look Back: The Story of Leroy 'Satchel' Paige (1981) (co-production with Satie Productions Ltd., TBA Productions Inc. and Triseme)
- Fly Away Home (1981) (co-production with An Lac Productions)
- Bugs Bunny: All-American Hero (1981)
- Golden Gate (1981) (co-production with Lin Bolen Productions)
- Sidney Shorr: A Girl's Best Friend (1981) (co-production with Hajeno Productions)
- A Few Days in Weasel Creek (1981) (co-production with Hummingbird Productions)
- Splendor in the Grass (1981) (co-production with Katz-Gallin Productions and Half-Pint Productions)
- The Marva Collins Story (1981) (co-production with Hallmark Hall of Fame Productions and NRW Features)
- The Children Nobody Wanted (1981) (co-production with Blatt-Singer Productions)
- Bugs Bunny's Mad World of Television (1982)
- Murder Is Easy (1982) (co-production with CBS Entertainment Production and David L. Wolper-Stan Margulies Productions)
- Victims (1982) (co-production with Hajeno Productions)
- The Long Summer of George Adams (1982)
- Divorce Wars: A Love Story (1982)
- Thou Shalt Not Kill (1982) (co-production with Edgar J. Scherick Associates)
- The Kid with the Broken Halo (1982) (co-production with Satellite Productions and Zephyr Productions)
- The Letter (1982) (co-production with Hajeno Productions)
- Bare Essence (1982)
- Missing Children: A Mother's Story (1982) (co-production with Kayden/Gleason)
- The Night the Bridge Fell Down (1983) (co-production with Irwin Allen Productions)
- V: The Original Miniseries (1983) (co-production with Kenneth Johnson Productions)
- Cave-In! (1983) (co-production with Irwin Allen Productions)
- Sparkling Cyanide (1983)
- A Caribbean Mystery (1983)
- Found Money (1983) (co-production with Cypress Point Productions)
- V: The Final Battle (1984) (co-production with Blatt-Singer Productions)
- The Mystic Warrior (1984)
- No Man's Land (1984)
- Goldie and the Bears (1984)
- His Mistress (1984)
- The Bad Seed (1985) (co-production with Hajeno Productions)
- Murder with Mirrors (1985)
- Midas Valley (1985) (co-production with Edward S. Feldman Company)
- Thirteen at Dinner (1985)
- Between the Darkness and the Dawn (1985) (co-production with Doris Quinlan Productions and Entheos Unlimited Productions)
- Looney Tunes 50th Anniversary (1986) (co-production with Broadway Video)
- Dead Man's Folly (1986)
- Kung Fu: The Movie (1986) (co-production with Lou Step Productions)
- Dallas: The Early Years (1986) (co-production with Lorimar Television and Roundelay Productions)
- Killer in the Mirror (1986) (co-production with Litke/Grossbart Productions)
- Northstar (1986) (co-production with Daniel Grodnik Productions and Clyde Philips Productions)
- Murder in Three Acts (1986)
- Of Pure Blood (1986)
- Promise (1986) (co-production with Garner-Duchow Productions and Hallmark Hall of Fame Productions)
- The Betty Ford Story (1987) (co-production with David L. Wolper Productions)
- Nutcracker: Money, Madness & Murder (1987) (co-production with Green Arrow Productions)
- The Spirit (1987) (co-production with De Souza Productions and Von Zerneck-Samuels Productions)
- Napoleon and Josephine: A Love Story (1987) (co-production with David L. Wolper Productions)
- What Price Victory (1988) (co-production with David L. Wolper Productions)
- The Town Bully (1988) (co-production with Dick Clark Productions)
- Roots: The Gift (1988) (co-production with David L. Wolper Productions)
- Bugs vs. Daffy: Battle of the Music Video Stars (1988)
- The Man in the Brown Suit (1989) (co-production with Alan Shayne Productions)
- Bugs Bunny's Wild World of Sports (1989)
- My Name Is Bill W. (1989) (co-production with Garner-Duchow Productions and Hallmark Hall of Fame Productions)
- The Plot to Kill Hitler (1990)
- Murder in Mississippi (1990)
- Forbidden Nights (1990) (co-production with Tristine Rainer Productions)
- The Face of Fear (1990)
- Happy Birthday, Bugs!: 50 Looney Years (1990) (co-production with Smith-Hemion Productions)
- A Promise to Keep (1990) (co-production with Elliot Friedgen & Company & Sacret)
- When You Remember Me (1990)
- To My Daughter (1990) (co-production with Zacs Productions and Nugget Entertainment)
- Dillinger (1991) (co-production with David L. Wolper Productions)
- Bugs Bunny's Overtures to Disaster (1991)
- Babe Ruth (1991) (co-production with Elliot Friedgen & Company)
- Prisoner of Honor (1991) (co-production with Dreyfuss / James Productions and Etude)
- Survive the Savage Sea (1992) (co-production with Von Zerneck-Sertner Films)
- Taking Back My Life: The Nancy Ziegenmeyer Story (1992) (co-production with Elliot Friedgen & Company and Lytte Heshty Production)
- A House of Secrets and Lies (1992) (co-production with Chris/Rose Productions and Elliot Friedgen & Company)
- Empire City (1992)
- The Sands of Time (1992) (co-production with Dove Audio)
- Condition: Critical (1992) (co-production with Toots Productions)
- Killer Rules (1993) (co-production with Lee Rich Company)
- The Flood: Who Will Save Our Children? (1993) (co-production with Wolper Productions and Film Queensland)
- I'll Fly Away: Then and Now (1993) (co-production with Brand/Falsey Productions)
- No Child of Mine (1993) (co-production with Bonnie Raskin Productions and Green/Epstein Productions)
- Fatal Deception: Mrs. Lee Harvey Oswald (1993) (co-production with Elliot Friedgen & Company, David L. Wolper Productions and Bernard Sofronski Productions)
- Attack of the 50 Ft. Woman (1993)
- A Cool Like That Christmas (1993)
- Lies of the Heart: The Story of Laurie Kellogg (1994) (co-production with MDT Productions and Daniel H. Blatt Productions)
- Beyond Obsession (1994)
- Where Are My Children (1994) (co-production with Andrea Baynes Productions)
- The Innocent (1994) (co-production with Grammnet Productions)
- Someone She Knows (1994)
- Beyond Betrayal (1994) (co-production with Daniel H. Blatt Productions)
- Without Warning (1994) (co-production with The Wolper Organization and Mountain View Productions)
- How the West Was Fun (1994) (co-production with Dualstar Productions, Green/Epstein Productions and Kicking Horse Productions Ltd.)
- Because Mommy Works (1994) (co-production with Spring Creek Productions)
- Spenser: The Judas Goat (1994) (co-production with ABC Cable & International Broadcast Inc., Boardwalk Entertainment and Protocol Entertainment)
- A Walton Wedding (1995) (co-production with Amanda Productions, Eagle Point Production and The Lee Rich Company)
- Young at Heart (1995) (co-production with TS Productions)
- Virtual Seduction (1995)
- Divas (1995) (co-production with CBS Productions and The Thomas Carter Company)
- Prince for a Day (1995) (co-production with The Wolper Organization)
- It Was Him or Us (1995) (co-production with MDT Productions)
- The Thorn Birds: The Missing Years (1996) (co-production with The Wolper Organization and Village Roadshow Pictures Television)
- A Brother's Promise: The Dan Jansen Story (1996)
- Sins of Silence (1996) (co-production with Daniel H. Blatt Productions)
- Radiant City (1996) (co-production with Witt/Thomas Productions)
- Never Give Up: The Jimmy V Story (1996) (co-production with Daniel H. Blatt Productions and Sports Illustrated Television)
- Kidz in the Wood (1996) (co-production with Green/Epstein Productions and Pacific Motion Pictures)
- Once You Meet a Stranger (1996) (co-production with Michael Filerman Productions)
- Blue Rodeo (1996) (co-production with Lakeside Productions and The Paul Lussier Company)
- Dallas: J.R. Returns (1996) (co-production with Eagle Paint Production and Olive Productions)
- Childhood Sweetheart? (1997) (co-production with Daniel H. Blatt Productions and Lakeside Productions)
- The Dukes of Hazzard: Reunion! (1997) (co-production with Kudzu Productions)
- Knots Landing: Back to the Cul-de-Sac (1997)
- A Walton Easter (1997) (co-production with Eagle Point Production)
- Dallas: War of the Ewings (1998) (co-production with Lakeside Productions)
- Blade Squad (1998) (co-production with H. Beale Company)
- Babylon 5: The River of Souls (1998)
- Babylon 5: Thirdspace (1998)
- Border Line (1999) (co-production with Aviator Films)
- Fail Safe (2000) (co-production with Maysville Pictures)
- The Dukes of Hazzard: Hazzard in Hollywood (2000) (co-production with Kudzu Productions)
- Witchblade (2000) (co-production with Halsted Pictures, Image Comics, Mythic Films and Top Cow Productions)
- Shadow Realm (2002) (co-production with Angel/Brown Productions)
- The Big Time (2002) (co-production with John Wells Productions)
- The Lone Ranger (2003) (co-production with Turner Television)
- Evil Never Dies (2003) (co-production with Coote Hayes Productions and The Wolper Organization)
- L.A. Confidential (2003) (co-production with Regency Television and The Wolper Organization)
- Christmas Vacation 2: Cousin Eddie's Island Adventure (2003) (co-production with Elliot Friedgan & Company and National Lampoon)
- The Goodbye Girl (2004) co-production with TNT)
- Helter Skelter (2004) (co-production with Lakeside Productions and Wolper Organization)
- Growing Pains: Return of the Seavers (2004) (co-production with Green-Epstein-Bacino Productions)
- Samantha: An American Girl Holiday (2004) (co-production with Red Om Films, Revolution Studios and Sam Films)
- Dallas Reunion: The Return to Southfork (2004) (co-production with Henry Winkler/Michael Levitt Productions)
- Snow Wonder (2005) (co-production with The Wolper Organization and Without Santa LLC)
- Felicity: An American Girl Adventure (2005) (co-production with Revolution Studios, Red Om Films and American Girl)
- Knots Landing Reunion: Together Again (2005) (co-production with Henry Winkler/Michael Levitt Productions)
- Avenger (2006) (co-production with TNT, Radiant Productions and Appledown Films Inc.)
- Aquaman (2006)
- Molly: An American Girl on the Home Front (2006) (co-production with American Girl, Red Om Films and Revolution Studios)
- The Year Without a Santa Claus (2006) (co-production with The Wolper Organization)
- Sybil (2007) (co-production with Norman Stephen Productions and Wolper Organization)
- Poison Ivy: The Secret Society (2008) (co-production with CineTel Films, Insight Film Studios and New Line Cinema)
- Innocent (2011) (co-production with Frank von Zerneck Films and Mike Robe Productions)
- Dolly Parton's Christmas of Many Colors: Circle of Love (2016) (co-production with Dixie Pixie Productions and Magnolia Hill Productions)
- Hairspray Live! (2016) (co-production with New Line Cinema, Sony Pictures Television, Storyline Entertainment and Universal Television)
- The Bad Seed (2018) (co-production with Front Street Pictures, Lifetime, Loweprofile, The Wolper Organization and Warner Horizon Unscripted Television)
- Critters Attack! (2019) (co-production with Blue Ribbon Content and New Line Cinema)
- The Waltons: Homecoming (2021) (co-production with Magnolia Hill Productions)
- The Waltons: Thanksgiving (2022) (co-production with Magnolia Hill Productions)
- Dolly Parton's Mountain Magic Christmas (2022) (co-production with Sandollar Productions and Magnolia Hill Productions)

===== Warner Horizon Unscripted Television =====
- A Christmas Story Live! (2017) (co-production with Marc Platt Productions and Turner Entertainment Co.)
- A West Wing Special to Benefit When We All Vote (2020) (co-production with Casey Patterson Entertainment and Shoe Money Productions)
- The Fresh Prince of Bel-Air Reunion (2020) (co-production with Westbrook)
- Friends: The Reunion (2021) (co-production with Bright/Kaufmann/Crane Productions and Fulwell 73 Productions)
- Scooby-Doo, Where Are You Now! (2021) (co-production with Warner Bros. Animation, Hanna-Barbera Cartoons and Abominable Pictures)
- Harry Potter 20th Anniversary: Return to Hogwarts (2021) (co-production with Casey Patterson Entertainment and Pulse Films)

===== Lorimar Television =====
- Aesop Fables (1971)
- The Crooked Hearts (1972)
- The Girls of Huntington House (1973)
- Dying Room Only (1973)
- Don't Be Afraid of the Dark (1973)
- The Blue Knight (1973)
- A Dream for Christmas (1973)
- The Stranger Within (1974)
- Bad Ronald (1974)
- The Runaway Barge (1975)
- The Runaways (1975)
- Returning Home (1975)
- Eric (1975)
- Conspiracy of Terror (1975)
- Widow (1976)
- Green Eyes (1977)
- The Prince of Central Park (1977)
- Killer on Board (1977)
- A Question of Guilt (1978)
- Desperate Women (1978)
- Long Journey Back (1978)
- Some Kind of Miracle (1979)
- Mr. Horn (1979)
- Marriage Is Alive and Well (1980)
- The Waltons: A Decade of the Waltons (1980)
- Reward (1980)
- A Perfect Match (1980)
- Rape and Marriage: The Rideout Case (1980)
- A Matter of Life and Death (1981)
- Our Family Business (1981)
- Mistress of Paradise (1981)
- Killjoy (1981)
- Washington Mistress (1982)
- A Wedding on Walton's Mountain (1982)
- Desperate Lives (1982)
- Mother's Day on Waltons Mountain (1982)
- This Is Kate Bennett.. (1982)
- Two of a Kind (1982)
- Johnny Belinda (1982)
- One Shoe Makes It Murder (1982)
- A Day for Thanks on Walton's Mountain (1982)
- Pajama Tops (1983)
- One Cooks, the Other Doesn't (1983)
- An Uncommon Love (1983)
- The Winter of Our Discontent (1983)
- Why Me? (1984)
- Spraggue (1984)
- Gulag (1985)
- Deadly Intentions (1985)
- Master Harold...and the Boys (1985)
- Blood & Orchids (1986)
- Dallas: The Early Years (1986)
- The Deliberate Stranger (1986)
- Circle of Violence: A Family Drama (1986)
- Love Among Thieves (1987)
- Shattered Innocence (1988)
- Glitz (1988)
- Desperate for Love (1989)
- The Outside Woman (1989)
- An Eight Is Enough Wedding (1989)
- Burning Bridges (1990)
- Hollywood Dog (1990)
- Deadly Intentions... Again? (1991)
- For the Very First Time (1991)
- Doublecrossed (1991)
- A Mother's Justice (1991)
- O Pioneers! (1992)
- Miss Rose White (1992)
- To Grandmother's House We Go (1992)
- A Killer Among Friends (1992)
- Just Mt Imagination (1992)
- Bloodlines: Murder in the Family (1993)
- Men Don't Tell (1993)
- Black Widow Murders: The Blanche Taylor Moore Story (1993)
- There Was a Little Boy (1993)
- A Walton Thanksgiving Reunion (1993)
- Island City (1994)

===== Warner Bros. International Television Production =====
- Gabriela (co-production with Estúdios Globo)
- The Windermere Children (2020) (co-production with Wall to Wall Media)

====== Ricochet ======
- Baring All: Strippers and Stripping (2002) (as Ricochet South)
- Too Big to Walk? (2006)
- Britain's Worst Teeth (2007)
- The Greatest TV Shows of the Noughties (2009)
- Sex in Class (2015)
- Drinkers Like Me – Adrian Chiles (2018)
- The Data Doctor (2018)
- Air Fryers: Are They Really Worth It? (2023)

====== Twenty Twenty Television ======
- Dispatches: The War Crimes File (1995)
- Hellraisers (2000)
- Secrets of the Dead: Blood on the Altar (2002)
- The Child Who's Older Than Her Grandmother (2004)
- Torture: The Guantanamo Guidebook (2005)
- Dispatches: Supermarket Secrets (2005)
- How to Divorce Without Screwing Up Your Children (2006)
- Dispatches: How to Beat Your Kid's Asthma (2006)
- Mum's Gone Gay (2007)
- Child Chain Smoker (2007)
- My Boyfriend, the Sex Tourist (2007)
- Whatever It Takes (2009)
- Shanties and Sea Songs with Gareth Malone (2010)
- 50 Greatest Harry Potter Moments (2011)
- Young Nuns (2011) (co-production with Jerusalem Productions)
- Lawless (2013)
- Rich Kids Go Shopping (2016)
- Eurotrash EU Referendum Special (2016) (co-production with Rapido Television)
- Why Is Covid Killing People of Colour? (2021)

====== Wall to Wall Media ======
- The Scandal Story (1989)
- The Real X-Files: America's Psychic Spies (1993)
- Bumping the Odds (1997) (co-production with Halcyon Productions)
- A Rather English Marriage (1998)
- Neanderthal (2001)
- Gunpowder, Treason and Plot (2001)
- Smallpox 2002 (2002)
- George Orwell: A Life in Pictures (2003)
- Agatha Christie: A Life in Pictures (2004)
- Oil Storm (2005)
- Ian Fleming: Bondmaker (2005)
- Elizabeth David: A Life in Recipes (2006)
- The Battle That Made Britain (2006)
- H. G. Wells: War with the World (2006)
- Discovery Atlas: France Revealed (2008)
- The Great Russian Art Room (2008)
- Backstairs Billy: The Queen Mum's Butler (2009)
- Who Killed Scarlett? (2009)
- Dispatches: The Big Job Hunt (2009)
- Dispatches: Rape in the City (2009)
- Journey to the Earth's Core (2011)
- The Girl (2012) (co-production with HBO Films)
- King of Coke: Living the High Life (2013)
- The Scandalous Lady W (2015)
- Gary Lineker: My Grandad's War (2019)
- The Windermere Children (2020) (co-production with Warner Bros. International Television Production)
- How to Keep a Healthy Weight with Michael Mosley (2021)
- David Baddiel: Social Media, Anger and Us (2021)
- Boobs (2022)

====== Renegade Pictures ======
- Who Framed Jesus? (2010)
- Cherry Has a Baby (2010)
- Marathon Boy (2010) (co-production with One Horse Town Productions)
- Art in China (2014) (co-production with EOS Films)
- Evil Monkeys (2018) (co-production with The Story Lab)
- Doing Money (2018)
- The New Air Force One: Flying Fortress (2021) (co-production with Infinite Light Productions and The Boeing Company)

===== Rankin/Bass Animated Entertainment (post-1973) =====
- The Year Without a Santa Claus (1974)
- 'Twas the Night Before Christmas (1974)
- The First Christmas: The Story of the First Christmas Snow (1975)
- Rudolph's Shiny New Year (1976)
- The First Easter Rabbit (1976)
- The Little Drummer Boy, Book II (1976)
- Frosty's Winter Wonderland (1976)
- The Last Dinosaur (1977) (TV movie)
- The Easter Bunny Is Comin' to Town (1977)
- The Hobbit (1977) (TV movie)
- Nestor the Long-Eared Christmas Donkey (1977)
- The Bermuda Depths (1978) (TV movie)
- The Stingiest Man in Town (1978)
- Rudolph and Frosty's Christmas in July (1979) (TV movie)
- Jack Frost (1979)
- The Ivory Ape (1980) (TV movie)
- The Return of the King (1980) (TV movie)
- Pinocchio's Christmas (1980)
- The Leprechaun's Christmas Gold (1981)
- The Flight of Dragons (1982) (TV movie)
- The Sins of Dorian Gray (1983) (TV movie)
- The Coneheads (1983) (co-production with Broadway Video)
- The Life and Adventures of Santa Claus (1985)
- The Wind in the Willows (1987) (TV movie)

==== Turner Entertainment/Turner Pictures ====
- How the Grinch Stole Christmas! (1966) (produced by MGM Television and Cat in the Hat Productions)
- The Dangerous Days of Kiowa Jones (1966) (produced by MGM Television and Youngstein & Karr Productions)
- The Scorpio Letters (1967)
- The Rise and Fall of the Third Reich (1968) (produced by MGM Television and Wolper Productions)
- Horton Hears a Who! (1970) (produced by MGM Television and Cat in the Hat Productions)
- Earth II (1971) (produced by MGM Television and Wabe)
- The Phantom of Hollywood (1974)
- Winter Kill (1974) (produced by MGM Television and Andy Griffith Enterprises)
- The Deadly Tower (1975)
- Babe (1975) (produced by MGM Television and Norman Felton/Stanley Rubin Productions)
- The Hostage Heart (1977) (produced by MGM Television and Andrews J. Fenady Productions)
- The Girl in the Empty Grave (1977) (produced by MGM Television and Manteo Enterprises)
- Deadly Game (1977) (produced by MGM Television and Manteo Enterprises)
- Death of a Centerfold: The Dorothy Stratten Story (1981) (produced by MGM Television and Wilcox Productions)
- Sweeney Todd: The Demon Barber of Fleet Street (1982) (produced by RKO Pictures)
- Treasure Island (1990)
- Conagher (1991)
- Miracle in the Wilderness (1991)
- Christmas in Connecticut (1992)
- The Heart of Justice (1992) (co-production with Amblin Television)
- Geronimo (1993)
- The Avenging Angel (1995)
- The Good Old Boys (1995)
- Riders of the Purple Sage (1996)
- The Man Who Captured Eichmann (1996)
- Last Stand at Saber River (1997)
- The Hunchback (aka The Hunchback of Notre Dame) (1997)
- Buffalo Soldiers (1997)
- Two for Texas (1998)
- Coma (2012) (miniseries) (produced by Warner Bros. Television, Sony Pictures Television and Scott Free Productions)
- Tom and Jerry: Santa's Little Helpers (2014) (produced by Warner Bros. Animation)
- A Christmas Story Live! (2017) (produced by Warner Horizon Television and Marc Platt Productions)

==== Castle Rock Entertainment ====
- Heart & Soul (1988)
- The Ed Begley Jr. Show (1989)
- Julie Brown: The Show (1989)
- My Old School (1991)
- Please Watch the Jon Lovitz Special (1992)

==== New Line Television ====
- Father and Scout (1994)
- Carmen: A Hip Hopera (2001)
- Brother's Keeper (2002)
- Wasted (2002)
- Just a Walk in the Park (2002)
- The Glow (2002)

==== Home Box Office, Inc. ====
- Pennsylvania Polka Festival (1973)
- Freddie the Freeloader's Christmas Dinner (1981)
- Reunion at Fairborough (1985) (co-production for Columbia Pictures Television)
- HBO Storybook Musicals (1987–1993)
  - Lyle, Lyle, Crocodile: The Musical (1987)
  - Alexander and the Terrible, Horrible, No Good, Very Bad Day (1990)
  - The Tale of Peter Rabbit (1991)
- Montana (1990)
- Without Pity: A Film About Abilities (1996)
- How Do You Spell God? (1996)
- 4 Little Girls (1997)
- Kids are Punny (1998)
- Goodnight Moon and Other Sleepytime Tales (1999)
- The Sissy Duckling (1999)
- Paradise Lost 2: Revelations (2000)
- Boycott (2001)
- 61* (2001)
- Conspiracy (2001)
- Stranger Inside (2001)
- Dinner with Friends (2001)
- Shot in the Heart (2001)
- We Stand Alone Together (2001)
- Through A Child's Eyes: September 11, 2001 (2002)
- Normal (2003)
- My House in Umbria (2003)
- And Starring Pancho Villa as Himself (2003)
- Iron Jawed Angels (2004)
- Strip Search (2004)
- Something the Lord Made (2004)
- Dirty War (2004)
- Lackawanna Blues (2005)
- Sometimes in April (2005)
- Warm Springs (2005)
- The Girl in the Café (2005)
- Walkout (2006)
- Longford (2006)
- Life Support (2007)
- Bury My Heart at Wounded Knee (2007)
- Stuart: A Life Backwards (2007)
- Joe's Palace (2007)
- A Child's Garden to Poetry (2011)
- The Immortal Life of Henriettta Lacks (2017)
- The Number on Great-Grandpa's Arm (2018)

===== Time-Life Television =====
- The Glass Menagerie (1973) (produced by Talent Associates-Norton Simon, Inc.)
- Life Goes to War: Hollywood and the Homefront (1977) (co-production with 20th Century Fox Television and Jack Haley Jr., Productions, Inc.)
- Lovey: A Circle of Children, Part II (1978)
- Who'll Save Our Children? (1978)
- Transplant (1979)
- Walking Through the Fire (1979)
- Sex and the Single Parent (1979)
- The Family Man (1979)
- Amber Waves (1980)
- Mister Lincoln (1980)
- The Plutonium Incident (1980)
- Mom, the Wolfman, and Me (1980)
- Father Figure (1980)
- Crisis at Central High (1980)
- Blinded by the Light (1980)
- The Bunker (1981) (co-production with SPF France and Antenne 2)
- Dial M for Murder (1981)
- Dream House (1981) (co-production with Hill/Mandelker Films)
- The Princess and the Cabbie (1981) (co-production with Freyda Rothstein Productions)
- John Hersey's The Wall (1982)

=== TNT Originals ===
- Everything That Rises (1998) (co-production with Magus Company and Larry Levinson Productions)
- Dollar for the Dead (1998) (co-production with Once Upon a Time Films)
- CHiPs '99 (1998) (co-production with Rosner Television)
- Houdini (1998) (co-production with Trilogy Entertainment Group)
- Purgatory (1999) (co-production with Rosemont Productions International)
- You Know My Name (1999) (co-production with Ancient Mariner Films)
- Passing Glory (1999)
- Pirates of Silicon Valley (1999) (co-production with Haft Entertainment and St. Nick Productions)
- The Hunley (1999) (co-production with Adelson Entertainment)
- A Slight Case of Murder (1999) (co-production with Firebrand)
- The Virginian (2000) (co-production with Big Town Productions)
- Don Quixote (2000) (co-production with Hallmark Entertainment)
- Freedom Song (2000) (co-production with Alphaville and Carrie Productions)
- Running Mates (2000) (co-production with Ruddy/Morgan and Gerald Rafshoon Productions)
- Baby (2000) (co-production with Sarabande Productions)
- Race Against Time (2000) (co-production with Motion International and Rosemont Productions International)
- Deadlocked (2000)
- Louis L'Amour's Crossfire Trail (2001)
- Boss of Bosses (2001) (co-production with Bleeker Street Films)
- Prince Charming (2001) (co-production with Hallmark Entertainment)
- James Dean (2001) (co-production with Gerber Pictures, Five Mile River Films and Splendid Television)
- The Mists of Avalon (2001) (co-production with Constantin Film, Stillking Films, and Wolper Organization)
- Framed (2002)
- Monday Night Mayhem (2002) (co-production with Greif Company)
- King of Texas (2002) (co-production with Milk & Honey Pictures, Flying Freehold Productions, and Hallmark Entertainment)
- Second String (2002)
- Door to Door (2002) (co-production with Rosemont Productions International and Angel/Brown Productions)
- Monte Walsh (2003)
- Second Nature (2003) (co-production with Granada Film, Ltd.)
- Word of Honor (2003) (produced by Jaffe/Braunstein Films & Hallmark Entertainment)
- The Goodbye Girl (2004) (co-production with Warner Bros. Television and Ron Ziskin Productions)
- Salem's Lot (2004) (co-production with Warner Bros. Television)
- Avenger (2006)
- Innocent (2011)
- Ricochet (2011)
- Hide (2011)
- Silent Witness (2011)
- Good Morning, Killer (2011)
- Deck the Halls (2011)
- Hornet's Nest (2012)

=== CNN Worldwide ===
- Desert Storm: The War Begins (1991)
- New Year's Eve Live (2001–present)
- LFG (2021) (co-production with Everywoman Studios, Change Content, Propagate Content)
- The Lost Sons (2021) (co-production with Raw TV)

== See also ==
- List of libraries owned by Warner Bros. Discovery
- List of Skydance television programs
