= List of Apple TV original programming =

Apple Inc. has produced and distributed its own original content since 2016. Since 2019, it has distributed shows and movies on its Apple TV streaming service.

The first television show produced by Apple was Planet of the Apps, a 2016 reality competition series. Their second, released in late 2017, was Carpool Karaoke: The Series, based on the popular recurring segment from The Late Late Show with James Corden.

In 2017, Apple appointed Jamie Erlicht and Zack Van Amburg to head a new video unit, then announced that it would produce original scripted programming, starting with straight-to-series orders for two television shows: a reboot of the anthology series Amazing Stories, by Steven Spielberg, and The Morning Show, a drama series starring Jennifer Aniston and Reese Witherspoon.

That year, reports emerged that Apple planned to spend about $1 billion on original programming through 2018, then that the company planned to spend $4.2 billion on original programming by 2022. In August 2019, it was reported that Apple had already spent over $6 billion on original programming.

On March 25, 2019, Apple announced a new slate of original programming and released a short film, Peanuts in Space: Secrets of Apollo 10. The company also announced a new streaming service, Apple TV+, which launched on November 1, 2019, in over 100 countries through the Apple TV app. The service was renamed Apple TV in October 2025.

== Current programming ==
=== Drama ===
| Title | Genre | Premiere | Seasons | Runtime | Status |
|---|---|---|---|---|---|
| For All Mankind | Alternate history science fiction | November 1, 2019 | 5 seasons, 50 episodes | 42–82 min | Renewed for final season |
| The Morning Show | Drama | November 1, 2019 | 4 seasons, 40 episodes | 46–66 min | Renewed for final season |
| Foundation | Science fiction | September 24, 2021 | 3 seasons, 30 episodes | 45–69 min | Renewed |
| Severance | Science fiction thriller | February 18, 2022 | 2 seasons, 19 episodes | 37–76 min | Renewed |
| Slow Horses | Spy thriller | April 1, 2022 | 6 seasons, 36 episodes | 39–62 min | Renewed for seasons 7–10 |
| The Last Thing He Told Me | Thriller | April 14, 2023 | 2 seasons, 15 episodes | 36–55 min | Pending |
| Silo | Dystopian science fiction | May 5, 2023 | 3 seasons, 30 episodes | 41–62 min | Final season due to premiere on July 9, 2027 |
| Hijack | Thriller | June 28, 2023 | 2 seasons, 15 episodes | 38–56 min | Pending |
| The Buccaneers | Period drama | November 8, 2023 | 2 seasons, 16 episodes | 49–55 min | Renewed |
| Monarch: Legacy of Monsters | Monster action | November 17, 2023 | 2 seasons, 20 episodes | 40–54 min | Pending |
| Criminal Record | Crime thriller | January 10, 2024 | 2 seasons, 16 episodes | 37–53 min | Pending |
| Sugar | Mystery drama | April 5, 2024 | 2 seasons, 16 episodes | 32–49 min | Pending |
| Dark Matter | Science fiction | May 8, 2024 | 2 seasons, 19 episodes | 46–62 min | Pending |
| Presumed Innocent | Legal drama | June 12, 2024 | 1 season, 8 episodes | 42–45 min | Season 2 due to premiere on February 19, 2027 |
| Your Friends & Neighbors | Black comedy crime drama | April 11, 2025 | 2 seasons, 19 episodes | 41–58 min | Renewed |
| Down Cemetery Road | Thriller | October 29, 2025 | 1 season, 8 episodes | 48–54 min | Renewed |
| Pluribus | Science fiction | November 7, 2025 | 1 season, 9 episodes | 43–62 min | Renewed |
| Imperfect Women | Psychological thriller | March 18, 2026 | 1 season, 8 episodes | 39–48 min | Renewed |
| Star City | Alternate history science fiction | May 29, 2026 | 1 season, 8 episodes | 55–65 min | Pending |
| Nocturne | Crime drama | October 30, 2026 | 1 season, 10 episodes | 47–62 min | Season 1 ongoing |
| 12 12 12 | Heist drama | November 13, 2026 | 1 season, 8 episodes | 52–59 min | Season 1 ongoing |
Awaiting release
| The Wanted Man | Crime thriller | January 6, 2027 | 1 season, 8 episodes | TBA | Pending |
| Neuromancer | Cyberpunk drama | January 22, 2027 | 1 season, 10 episodes | TBA | Pending |
| Wild Things | Biographical drama | April 16, 2027 | 7 episodes | TBA | Miniseries |

=== Comedy ===
| Title | Genre | Premiere | Seasons | Runtime | Status |
|---|---|---|---|---|---|
| Trying | Comedy | May 1, 2020 | 5 seasons, 40 episodes | 26–32 min | Pending |
| Ted Lasso | Sports comedy drama | August 14, 2020 | 4 seasons, 44 episodes | 29–75 min | Pending |
| Loot | Comedy | June 24, 2022 | 3 seasons, 30 episodes | 23–33 min | Pending |
| Shrinking | Comedy drama | January 27, 2023 | 3 seasons, 33 episodes | 28–63 min | Renewed |
| Platonic | Comedy | May 24, 2023 | 2 seasons, 20 episodes | 27–32 min | Renewed |
| Bad Monkey | Crime comedy | August 14, 2024 | 1 season, 10 episodes | 45–56 min | Season 2 due to premiere on December 2, 2026 |
| The Studio | Workplace comedy | March 26, 2025 | 1 season, 10 episodes | 25–44 min | Renewed |
| Murderbot | Science fiction action comedy | May 16, 2025 | 1 season, 10 episodes | 24–29 min | Renewed |
| Stick | Sports comedy | June 4, 2025 | 2 seasons, 20 episodes | 29–45 min | Season 2 ongoing |
| Margo's Got Money Troubles | Comedy drama | April 15, 2026 | 1 season, 8 episodes | 35–44 min | Renewed |
| Widow's Bay | Horror comedy | April 29, 2026 | 1 season, 10 episodes | 31–48 min | Renewed |
| Maximum Pleasure Guaranteed | Comedy thriller | May 20, 2026 | 1 season, 10 episodes | 28–40 min | Renewed |
| Brothers | Comedy | September 23, 2026 | 1 season, 8 episodes | 22–32 min | Pending |
Awaiting release
| She's Fine | Comedy | January 27, 2027 | 1 season, 10 episodes | TBA | Pending |
| Prodigies | Romantic comedy | February 10, 2027 | 1 season, 7 episodes | TBA | Pending |

=== Non-English language scripted ===
| Title | Genre | Premiere | Seasons | Runtime | Language | Status |
|---|---|---|---|---|---|---|
| Women in Blue | Crime drama | July 31, 2024 | 2 season, 18 episodes | 44–61 min | Spanish | Pending |
| Where's Wanda? | Dark comedy | October 2, 2024 | 2 seasons, 16 episodes | 41–48 min | German | Season 2 ongoing |
| Carême | Period drama | April 30, 2025 | 1 season, 8 episodes | 36–50 min | French | Renewed |
| The Hunt | Thriller | March 4, 2026 | 1 season, 6 episodes | 46–53 min | French | Pending |

=== Co-productions ===
These shows have been commissioned by Apple TV with a partner network.

| Title | Genre | Partner | Premiere | Seasons | Runtime | Language | Status |
|---|---|---|---|---|---|---|---|
| Tehran | Spy thriller | Kan 11 | September 25, 2020 | 3 seasons, 24 episodes | 36–51 min | English; Hebrew; Persian | Renewed |
| Drops of God | Drama | France Télévisions; Hulu Japan | April 21, 2023 | 2 seasons, 16 episodes | 36–58 min | English; French; Japanese | Pending |
| Berlin ER | Medical drama | ZDFneo | February 26, 2025 | 1 season, 8 episodes | 44–47 min | German | Renewed |

=== Kids & family ===
| Title | Genre | Premiere | Seasons | Runtime | Status |
|---|---|---|---|---|---|
| Slumberkins | Children's puppetry | November 4, 2022 | 1 season, 8 episodes | 21–22 min | Season 2 due to premiere on February 5, 2027 |
| Yo Gabba GabbaLand! | Children's puppetry | August 9, 2024 | 2 seasons, 20 episodes | 24–25 min | Pending |

=== Animation ===
==== Kids & family ====
| Title | Genre | Premiere | Seasons | Runtime | Status |
|---|---|---|---|---|---|
| Stillwater | Comedy | December 4, 2020 | 5 seasons, 40 episodes | 23–25 min | Pending |
| Camp Snoopy | Comedy | June 14, 2024 | 2 seasons, 26 episodes | 21 min | Pending |
| Wonder Pets: In the City | Educational musical | December 13, 2024 | 2 seasons, 26 episodes | 23–24 min | Pending |
| The Sisters Grimm | Mystery fantasy | October 3, 2025 | 2 seasons, 12 episodes | 22–24 min | Pending |
| My Brother the Minotaur | Mystery fantasy | April 24, 2026 | 1 season, 10 episodes | 21–38 min | Pending |

=== Unscripted ===
==== Docuseries ====
| Title | Subject | Premiere | Seasons | Runtime | Status |
|---|---|---|---|---|---|
| Prehistoric Planet | Natural history | May 23, 2022 | 3 seasons, 15 episodes | 37–46 min | Pending |
| The Reluctant Traveler | Travel | February 24, 2023 | 3 seasons, 23 episodes | 33–38 min | Renewed |
| Knife Edge: Chasing Michelin Stars | Restaurant industry | October 10, 2025 | 2 seasons, 16 episodes | 37–55 min | Renewed |
| Born to Be Wild | Nature | December 19, 2025 | 1 season, 6 episodes | 34–36 min | Pending |
| Awkwafina: The Unlikely Cook | Travel | November 6, 2026 | 1 season, 8 episodes | 31–33 min | Season 1 ongoing |

=== Sports programming ===
| Title | Genre | Premiere | Runtime | Status |
|---|---|---|---|---|
| Countdown to First Pitch | Sports broadcast | April 7, 2022 | 15–45 min | Ongoing |
| MLB Daily Recap | Sports broadcast | April 7, 2022 | 30–45 min | Ongoing |
| Friday Night Baseball | Sports broadcast | April 8, 2022 | 3 h (approx.) | Renewed through the 2028 season |
| Circuits in Focus | F1 pre-race show | April 30, 2026 | 7 min | Ongoing |

=== Specials ===
| Title | Genre | Release | Runtime |
Awaiting release
| Fraggle Rock: A Holiday Gift | Children's puppetry | December 4, 2026 | TBA |

== Upcoming original programming ==
=== Drama ===
| Title | Genre | Premiere | Seasons | Runtime | Status |
|---|---|---|---|---|---|
| The Savant | Drama miniseries | Early 2027 | 8 episodes | TBA | Post-production |
| Berlin Noir | Thriller | TBA | TBA | TBA | Filming |
| Disavowed | Action thriller | TBA | TBA | TBA | Filming |
| Guilty Creatures | Thriller | TBA | TBA | TBA | Filming |
| Safe Houses | Spy thriller miniseries | TBA | 8 episodes | TBA | Filming |
| The Off Weeks | Drama miniseries | TBA | 8 episodes | TBA | Filming |
| Untitled Dakota Fanning series | Thriller | TBA | TBA | TBA | Filming |
| Untitled Monarch: Legacy of Monsters spin-off | Monster action | TBA | TBA | TBA | Filming |
| Ascension | Horror thriller | TBA | TBA | TBA | Series order |
| The Dealer | Drama | TBA | TBA | TBA | Series order |

=== Comedy ===
| Title | Genre | Premiere | Seasons | Runtime | Status |
|---|---|---|---|---|---|
| The Choir | Comedy drama | 2027 | 1 season, 8 episodes | TBA | Filming |
| The Husbands | Comedy drama miniseries | TBA | 8 episodes | TBA | Post-production |
| Lenni | Comedy drama | TBA | TBA | TBA | Filming |
| Beat the Reaper | Crime comedy drama | TBA | TBA | TBA | Series order |
| I'm Glad My Mom Died | Comedy drama | TBA | 1 season, 10 episodes | TBA | Series order |

=== Non-English language scripted ===
| Title | Genre | Premiere | Seasons | Runtime | Language | Status |
|---|---|---|---|---|---|---|
| La Décision | Political thriller | TBA | 1 season, 7 episodes | TBA | French | Series order |

=== Unscripted ===
==== Docuseries ====
| Title | Subject | Premiere | Seasons | Runtime | Status |
|---|---|---|---|---|---|
| Untitled Justin Timberlake docuseries | Music | December 2026 | 4 episodes | TBA | Series order |
| Untitled Andre Agassi docuseries | Sports | TBA | TBA | TBA | Series order |

==== Reality ====
| Title | Genre | Premiere | Seasons | Runtime | Status |
|---|---|---|---|---|---|
| The Last Person on Earth | Dating show | TBA | 1 season, 8 episodes | TBA | Series order |

=== In development ===
| Title | Genre |
|---|---|
| American Comfort | Comedy |
| Bad News Dads | Mystery comedy |
| Bananas | Drama |
| The Brothers Lionheart | Fantasy |
| Dilettante | Drama |
| Funny You Should Ask | Romance |
| High Wire | Thriller |
| Nanny Squatter | Comedy drama miniseries |
| Nomad | Crime drama |
| Peculiar Stars | Romance |
| Protective Custody | Comedy |
| Sheepdogs | Thriller |
| The Stormlight Archive | Fantasy |
| Stowaway | Drama |
| Untitled Carol Burnett series | Drama |
| Untitled Claus von Bülow series | Biographical drama miniseries |
| Untitled Emily Ratajkowski/Lena Dunham/Stephanie Danler series | Drama |
| Untitled The Holiday series | Romantic comedy miniseries |
| Untitled John Rain series | Crime thriller |

== Ended programming ==
These shows have either completed their runs or Apple TV stopped producing episodes. A show is also assumed to have ended if there has been no confirmed news of renewal at least one year after the show's last episode was released.

=== Drama ===
| Title | Genre | Premiere | Finale | Seasons | Runtime | Notes |
|---|---|---|---|---|---|---|
| See | Science fiction | November 1, 2019 | October 14, 2022 | 3 seasons, 24 episodes | 42–62 min | |
| Servant | Psychological horror | November 28, 2019 | March 17, 2023 | 4 seasons, 40 episodes | 24–36 min | |
| Truth Be Told | Legal drama | December 6, 2019 | March 24, 2023 | 3 seasons, 28 episodes | 39–52 min | |
| Amazing Stories | Science fiction anthology | March 6, 2020 | April 3, 2020 | 1 season, 5 episodes | 47–53 min | |
| Home Before Dark | Mystery drama | April 3, 2020 | August 13, 2021 | 2 seasons, 20 episodes | 41–57 min | |
| Defending Jacob | Legal drama | April 24, 2020 | May 29, 2020 | 8 episodes | 45–65 min | (Note: Miniseries) |
| Little Voice | Musical drama | July 10, 2020 | August 21, 2020 | 1 season, 9 episodes | 25–34 min | |
| The Mosquito Coast | Action thriller | April 30, 2021 | January 6, 2023 | 2 seasons, 17 episodes | 39–57 min | |
| Lisey's Story | Romance horror | June 4, 2021 | July 16, 2021 | 8 episodes | 46–56 min | |
| Invasion | Science fiction | October 22, 2021 | October 24, 2025 | 3 seasons, 30 episodes | 33–58 min | |
| Swagger | Sports drama | October 29, 2021 | August 11, 2023 | 2 seasons, 18 episodes | 45–62 min | |
| The Shrink Next Door | Psychological drama | November 12, 2021 | December 17, 2021 | 8 episodes | 35–49 min | |
| Suspicion | Political thriller | February 4, 2022 | March 18, 2022 | 1 season, 8 episodes | 44–50 min | |
| The Last Days of Ptolemy Grey | Drama | March 11, 2022 | April 8, 2022 | 6 episodes | 49–57 min | |
| WeCrashed | Drama | March 18, 2022 | April 22, 2022 | 8 episodes | 48–61 min | |
| Pachinko | Period drama | March 25, 2022 | October 11, 2024 | 2 seasons, 16 episodes | 47–63 min | |
| Roar | Feminist drama anthology | April 15, 2022 | | 1 season, 8 episodes | 29–37 min | |
| Shining Girls | Supernatural thriller | April 29, 2022 | June 3, 2022 | 1 season, 8 episodes | 41–59 min | |
| The Essex Serpent | Period drama | May 13, 2022 | June 10, 2022 | 6 episodes | 42–50 min | |
| Black Bird | True crime drama | July 8, 2022 | August 5, 2022 | 6 episodes | 54–60 min | |
| Surface | Psychological thriller | July 29, 2022 | April 11, 2025 | 2 seasons, 16 episodes | 40–53 min | |
| Five Days at Memorial | Medical drama | August 12, 2022 | September 16, 2022 | 8 episodes | 39–54 min | |
| Bad Sisters | Dark comedy thriller | August 19, 2022 | December 24, 2024 | 2 seasons, 18 episodes | 49–55 min | |
| Shantaram | Adventure drama | October 14, 2022 | December 16, 2022 | 1 season, 12 episodes | 44–60 min | |
| Echo 3 | Action thriller | November 23, 2022 | January 13, 2023 | 1 season, 10 episodes | 42–61 min | |
| Dear Edward | Drama | February 3, 2023 | March 24, 2023 | 1 season, 10 episodes | 45–54 min | |
| Hello Tomorrow! | Science fiction comedy drama | February 17, 2023 | April 7, 2023 | 1 season, 10 episodes | 31–33 min | |
| Extrapolations | Drama anthology | March 17, 2023 | April 21, 2023 | 8 episodes | 45–58 min | |
| City on Fire | Crime drama | May 12, 2023 | June 16, 2023 | 1 season, 8 episodes | 46–58 min | |
| The Crowded Room | Psychological thriller | June 9, 2023 | July 28, 2023 | 10 episodes | 38–56 min | |
| The Changeling | Horror fantasy | September 8, 2023 | October 13, 2023 | 1 season, 8 episodes | 29–52 min | |
| Lessons in Chemistry | Period drama | October 13, 2023 | November 22, 2023 | 8 episodes | 41–50 min | |
| Masters of the Air | War drama | January 26, 2024 | March 15, 2024 | 9 episodes | 55–62 min | |
| Constellation | Psychological thriller | February 21, 2024 | March 27, 2024 | 1 season, 8 episodes | 50–58 min | |
| The New Look | Historical drama | February 14, 2024 | April 3, 2024 | 1 season, 10 episodes | 49–61 min | |
| Manhunt | Political drama | March 15, 2024 | April 19, 2024 | 7 episodes | 54–56 min | |
| Franklin | Biographical drama | April 12, 2024 | May 17, 2024 | 8 episodes | 48–60 min | |
| The Big Cigar | Biographical drama | May 17, 2024 | June 14, 2024 | 6 episodes | 37–41 min | |
| Lady in the Lake | Drama thriller | July 19, 2024 | August 23, 2024 | 7 episodes | 53–54 min | |
| Disclaimer | Thriller | October 11, 2024 | November 8, 2024 | 7 episodes | 43–56 min | |
| Before | Psychological thriller | October 25, 2024 | December 20, 2024 | 10 episodes | 29–35 min | |
| Prime Target | Thriller | January 22, 2025 | March 5, 2025 | 1 season, 8 episodes | 43–56 min | |
| Dope Thief | Crime drama | March 14, 2025 | April 25, 2025 | 8 episodes | 43–53 min | |
| Smoke | Crime drama | June 27, 2025 | August 15, 2025 | 1 season, 9 episodes | 41–65 min | |
| Chief of War | Historical drama | August 1, 2025 | September 19, 2025 | 1 season, 9 episodes | 40–59 min | |
| The Last Frontier | Action drama | October 10, 2025 | December 5, 2025 | 1 season, 10 episodes | 55–60 min | |
| Cape Fear | Psychological thriller | June 5, 2026 | July 31, 2026 | 10 episodes | 48–55 min | |
| Lucky | Crime thriller | July 15, 2026 | August 19, 2026 | 7 episodes | 39–48 min | |
| Last Seen | Thriller | September 9, 2026 | October 7, 2026 | 6 episodes | 44–53 min | |

=== Comedy ===
| Title | Genre | Premiere | Finale | Seasons | Runtime | Notes |
|---|---|---|---|---|---|---|
| Dickinson | Period comedy | November 1, 2019 | December 24, 2021 | 3 seasons, 30 episodes | 25–34 min | |
| Little America | Comedy drama anthology | January 17, 2020 | December 9, 2022 | 2 seasons, 16 episodes | 29–36 min | |
| Mythic Quest | Workplace comedy | February 7, 2020 | March 26, 2025 | 4 seasons, 40 episodes | 24–37 min | |
| Physical | Dark comedy | June 18, 2021 | September 27, 2023 | 3 seasons, 30 episodes | 23–34 min | |
| Schmigadoon! | Musical comedy | July 16, 2021 | May 3, 2023 | 2 seasons, 12 episodes | 25–34 min | |
| Mr. Corman | Comedy drama | August 6, 2021 | October 1, 2021 | 1 season, 10 episodes | 23–34 min | |
| Acapulco | Comedy | October 8, 2021 | September 17, 2025 | 4 seasons, 40 episodes | 26–36 min | |
| The Afterparty | Murder mystery comedy | January 28, 2022 | September 6, 2023 | 2 seasons, 18 episodes | 31–48 min | |
| The Big Door Prize | Comedy | March 29, 2023 | June 12, 2024 | 2 seasons, 20 episodes | 29–35 min | |
| High Desert | Comedy | May 17, 2023 | June 21, 2023 | 1 season, 8 episodes | 25–37 min | |
| Still Up | Comedy | September 22, 2023 | October 27, 2023 | 1 season, 8 episodes | 25–28 min | |
| The Completely Made-Up Adventures of Dick Turpin | Historical comedy adventure | March 1, 2024 | October 15, 2025 | 1 season, 7 episodes | 31–33 min | |
| Palm Royale | Period comedy | March 20, 2024 | January 14, 2026 | 2 seasons, 20 episodes | 44–51 min | |
| Land of Women | Comedy drama | June 26, 2024 | July 24, 2024 | 1 season, 6 episodes | 42–45 min | |
| Sunny | Dark comedy | July 10, 2024 | September 4, 2024 | 1 season, 10 episodes | 29–36 min | |
| Time Bandits | Fantasy adventure comedy | July 24, 2024 | August 21, 2024 | 1 season, 10 episodes | 35–46 min | |
| Side Quest | Workplace comedy anthology | March 26, 2025 | | 4 episodes | 28–34 min | |
| Government Cheese | Comedy drama | April 16, 2025 | May 28, 2025 | 1 season, 10 episodes | 25–42 min | |

=== Non-English language scripted ===
| Title | Genre | Premiere | Finale | Seasons | Runtime | Language | Notes |
|---|---|---|---|---|---|---|---|
| Dr. Brain | Science fiction thriller | November 3, 2021 | December 9, 2021 | 1 season, 6 episodes | 49–68 min | Korean | |
| Now and Then | Thriller | May 20, 2022 | June 24, 2025 | 1 season, 8 episodes | 47–65 min | English; Spanish | |
| Liaison | Thriller | February 24, 2023 | March 31, 2023 | 1 season, 6 episodes | 50–56 min | English; French | |
| La Maison | Drama | September 20, 2024 | November 15, 2024 | 1 season, 10 episodes | 46–56 min | French | |
| Midnight Family | Medical drama | September 25, 2024 | November 20, 2024 | 1 season, 10 episodes | 44–55 min | Spanish | |
| Love You to Death | Romantic comedy | February 5, 2025 | March 12, 2025 | 1 season, 7 episodes | 33–40 min | Spanish | |

=== Co-productions ===
These shows have been commissioned by Apple TV with a partner network.

| Title | Genre | Partner | Premiere | Seasons | Runtime | Language | Notes |
|---|---|---|---|---|---|---|---|
| Losing Alice | Erotic thriller | Hot | January 22, 2021 | 1 season, 8 episodes | 42–55 min | Hebrew | |
| Calls | Mystery thriller | Canal+ | March 19, 2021 | 1 season, 9 episodes | 13–20 min | English | |

=== Kids & family ===
| Title | Genre | Premiere | Finale | Seasons | Runtime | Notes |
|---|---|---|---|---|---|---|
| Ghostwriter | Family mystery | November 1, 2019 | October 21, 2022 | 3 seasons, 39 episodes | 22–31 min | |
| Helpsters | Educational/puppetry | November 1, 2019 | January 6, 2023 | 3 seasons, 40 episodes | 22–31 min | |
| Fraggle Rock: Rock On! | Puppetry | April 21, 2020 | May 26, 2020 | 1 season, 6 episodes | 5–8 min | |
| Helpsters Help You | Educational/puppetry | April 24, 2020 | May 29, 2020 | 6 episodes | 1–3 min | |
| Puppy Place | Family adventure | October 15, 2021 | December 9, 2022 | 2 seasons, 16 episodes | 19–26 min | |
| Hello, Jack! The Kindness Show | Children's educational | November 5, 2021 | October 7, 2022 | 2 seasons, 16 episodes | 21–22 min | |
| Fraggle Rock: Back to the Rock | Children's puppetry | January 21, 2022 | March 29, 2024 | 2 seasons, 27 episodes | 25–29 min | |
| Lovely Little Farm | Live-action animated family comedy | June 10, 2022 | June 16, 2023 | 2 seasons, 14 episodes | 21–27 min | |
| Best Foot Forward | Family comedy | July 22, 2022 | | 1 season, 10 episodes | 21–26 min | |
| Amber Brown | Family comedy | July 29, 2022 | | 1 season, 10 episodes | 21–26 min | |
| Surfside Girls | Family mystery drama | August 19, 2022 | | 1 season, 10 episodes | 22–25 min | |
| Life by Ella | Family drama | September 2, 2022 | | 1 season, 10 episodes | 21–27 min | |
| Circuit Breakers | Science fiction anthology | November 11, 2022 | | 1 season, 7 episodes | 21–31 min | |
| Jane | Live-action animated family drama | April 14, 2023 | April 18, 2025 | 3 seasons, 20 episodes | 22–26 min | |
| Me | Science fiction | July 12, 2024 | | 1 season, 10 episodes | 20–25 min | |

=== Animation ===
==== Adult animation ====
| Title | Genre | Premiere | Finale | Seasons | Runtime | Notes |
|---|---|---|---|---|---|---|
| Central Park | Musical Animated sitcom | May 29, 2020 | November 18, 2022 | 3 seasons, 39 episodes | 21–31 min | |
| Strange Planet | Science fiction comedy | August 9, 2023 | September 27, 2023 | 1 season, 10 episodes | 19–25 min | |

==== Kids & family ====
| Title | Genre | Premiere | Finale | Seasons | Runtime | Notes |
|---|---|---|---|---|---|---|
| Snoopy in Space | Adventure | November 1, 2019 | November 12, 2021 | 2 seasons, 24 episodes | 8 min | |
| Doug Unplugs | Adventure | November 13, 2020 | April 1, 2022 | 2 season, 26 episodes | 23 min | |
| The Snoopy Show | Comedy | February 5, 2021 | December 1, 2023 | 3 seasons, 39 episodes | 22 min | |
| Wolfboy and the Everything Factory | Fantasy | September 24, 2021 | September 30, 2022 | 2 seasons, 20 episodes | 24–27 min | |
| Get Rolling with Otis | Adventure | October 8, 2021 | September 30, 2022 | 2 seasons, 18 episodes | 23 min | |
| Harriet the Spy | Mystery | November 19, 2021 | May 5, 2023 | 2 seasons, 20 episodes | 23–24 min | |
| El Deafo | Family | January 7, 2022 | | 3 episodes | 24–28 min | |
| Pretzel and the Puppies | Animation | February 11, 2022 | February 24, 2023 | 2 seasons, 18 episodes | 23 min | |
| Pinecone & Pony | Adventure | April 8, 2022 | February 3, 2023 | 2 seasons, 16 episodes | 23 min | |
| Duck & Goose | Education | July 8, 2022 | July 7, 2023 | 2 seasons, 17 episodes | 23 min | |
| Sago Mini Friends | Educational | September 16, 2022 | November 22, 2024 | 3 seasons, 24 episodes | 23 min | |
| Interrupting Chicken | Education | November 18, 2022 | September 29, 2023 | 2 season, 17 episodes | 23–26 min | |
| Shape Island | Comedy | January 20, 2023 | August 29, 2025 | 2 seasons, 18 episodes | 22–24 min | |
| Eva the Owlet | Adventure | March 31, 2023 | January 24, 2025 | 2 seasons, 17 episodes | 23 min | |
| Frog and Toad | Fantasy | April 28, 2023 | May 31, 2024 | 2 seasons, 18 episodes | 22–24 min | |
| Curses! | Adventure horror | October 27, 2023 | October 4, 2024 | 2 seasons, 20 episodes | 23 min | |
| WondLa | Science fiction fantasy | June 28, 2024 | November 26, 2025 | 3 seasons, 20 episodes | 22–24 min | |
| Goldie | Comedy | February 14, 2025 | | 1 season, 13 episodes | 23–24 min | |
| Bearbrick | Musical comedy | March 21, 2025 | | 1 season, 13 episodes | 21–23 min | |
| Not a Box | Educational | June 13, 2025 | | 1 season, 8 episodes | 23 min | |

=== Unscripted ===
==== Docuseries ====
| Title | Subject | Premiere | Finale | Seasons | Runtime | Notes |
|---|---|---|---|---|---|---|
| Visible: Out on Television | LGBT culture/Television | February 14, 2020 | | 5 episodes | 50–72 min | |
| Home | Architecture | April 17, 2020 | June 17, 2022 | 2 season, 19 episodes | 27–39 min | |
| Dear... | Celebrity | June 5, 2020 | March 10, 2023 | 2 seasons, 20 episodes | 23–38 min | |
| Greatness Code | Sports | July 10, 2020 | May 13, 2022 | 2 seasons, 13 episodes | 5–11 min | |
| Long Way Up | Travel | September 18, 2020 | November 13, 2020 | 11 episodes | 43–52 min | |
| Tiny World | Nature | October 2, 2020 | April 16, 2021 | 2 seasons, 12 episodes | 25–32 min | |
| Becoming You | Developmental psychology | November 13, 2020 | | 1 season, 6 episodes | 39–43 min | |
| Earth at Night in Color | Nature | December 4, 2020 | April 16, 2021 | 2 seasons, 12 episodes | 27–29 min | |
| 1971: The Year That Music Changed Everything | Music | May 21, 2021 | | 8 episodes | 42–49 min | |
| The Me You Can't See | Mental health | May 21, 2021 | May 28, 2021 | 1 season, 6 episodes | 46–91 min | |
| Watch the Sound with Mark Ronson | Music | July 30, 2021 | | 1 season, 6 episodes | 33–36 min | |
| The Line | True crime | November 19, 2021 | | 4 episodes (Note: Accompanied by a 6-part podcast of the same name that premiered on April 6, 2021) | 53–58 min | |
| Lincoln's Dilemma | Biography | February 18, 2022 | | 4 episodes | 52–58 min | |
| The Long Game: Bigger Than Basketball | Sports | April 22, 2022 | | 1 season, 5 episodes | 48–53 min | |
| They Call Me Magic | Sports | April 22, 2022 | | 1 season, 4 episodes | 56–61 min | |
| Make or Break | Sports | April 29, 2022 | February 24, 2023 | 2 seasons, 15 episodes | 33–49 min | |
| The Big Conn | True crime | May 6, 2022 | | 4 episodes | 54–59 min | |
| Gutsy | Culture/Social justice | September 9, 2022 | | 1 season, 8 episodes | 38–42 min | |
| Super League: The War for Football | Sports | January 13, 2023 | | 4 episodes | 53–59 min | |
| Real Madrid: Until the End | Sports | March 10, 2023 | | 3 episodes | 47–60 min | |
| Monster Factory | Sports | March 17, 2023 | | 6 episodes | 29–36 min | |
| Boom! Boom! The World vs. Boris Becker | Sports/True crime | April 7, 2023 | | 2 episodes | 67–113 min | |
| Big Beasts | Nature | April 21, 2023 | May 19, 2023 | 1 season, 10 episodes | 28–29 min | |
| Wanted: The Escape of Carlos Ghosn | Business/True crime | August 25, 2023 | | 4 episodes | 44–51 min | |
| The Super Models | Fashion | September 20, 2023 | | 4 episodes | 48–55 min | |
| Messi Meets America | Sports | October 11, 2023 | December 6, 2023 | 1 season, 6 episodes | 33–39 min | |
| The Enfield Poltergeist | Supernatural | October 27, 2023 | | 4 episodes | 53–62 min | |
| John Lennon: Murder Without a Trial | True crime | December 6, 2023 | | 3 episodes | 36–40 min | |
| The Dynasty: New England Patriots | Sports | February 16, 2024 | March 15, 2024 | 10 episodes | 38–42 min | |
| Messi's World Cup: The Rise of a Legend | Sports | February 21, 2024 | | 4 episodes | 43–48 min | |
| Earthsounds | Nature | February 23, 2024 | | 1 season, 12 episodes | 28–34 min | |
| STEVE! (martin) a documentary in 2 pieces (Note: Co-distributed with A24) | Biography | March 29, 2024 | | 2 episodes | 94–97 min | |
| Hollywood Con Queen | True crime | May 8, 2024 | | 3 episodes | 44–60 min | |
| Omnivore | Food/Travel | July 19, 2024 | | 1 season, 8 episodes | 35–50 min | |
| Cowboy Cartel | True crime | August 2, 2024 | | 4 episodes | 40–51 min | |
| K-Pop Idols | Music | August 30, 2024 | | 6 episodes | 39–44 min | |
| Vietnam: The War That Changed America | History | January 31, 2025 | | 6 episodes | 37–46 min | |
| Onside: Major League Soccer | Sports | February 21, 2025 | | 8 episodes | 34–46 min | |
| Fight for Glory: 2024 World Series | Sports | March 28, 2025 | | 3 episodes | 53-65 min | |
| Number One on the Call Sheet | Entertainment industry | March 28, 2025 | | 2 episodes | 92–97 min | |
| Long Way Home | Travel | May 9, 2025 | | 10 episodes | 36–45 min | |
| The Wild Ones | Nature | July 11, 2025 | | 1 season, 6 episodes | 36–46 min | |
| Mr. Scorsese | Filmmaking | October 17, 2025 | | 5 episodes | 52–63 min | |
| Twisted Yoga | True crime | March 13, 2026 | | 3 episodes | 42–50 min | |
| The Dynasty: UConn Huskies | Sports | August 21, 2026 | | 3 episodes | 38–46 min | |

==== Reality ====
| Title | Genre | Premiere | Finale | Seasons | Runtime | Notes |
|---|---|---|---|---|---|---|
| My Kind of Country | Reality competition | March 24, 2023 | April 7, 2023 | 1 season, 8 episodes | 41–45 min | |
| KPopped | Music competition | August 29, 2025 | | 1 season, 8 episodes | 28–32 min | |

==== Variety ====
| Title | Genre | Premiere | Finale | Seasons | Runtime | Notes |
|---|---|---|---|---|---|---|
| Oprah's Book Club | Book club | November 1, 2019 | October 22, 2021 | 1 season, 14 episodes | 8–66 min | |
| Oprah Talks COVID-19 | Interview | March 21, 2020 | April 14, 2020 | 1 season, 13 episodes | 15–45 min | |
| The Oprah Conversation | Talk show | July 30, 2020 | November 5, 2021 | 1 season, 15 episodes | 32–79 min | |
| The Problem with Jon Stewart | News/talk show | September 30, 2021 | April 6, 2023 | 2 seasons, 20 episodes | 41–57 min | |

=== Continuations ===
| Title | Genre | Prev. network(s) | Premiere | Finale | Seasons | Runtime | Notes |
|---|---|---|---|---|---|---|---|
| Carpool Karaoke: The Series (season 5) | Reality | Apple Music/Apple TV | May 27, 2022 | June 23, 2023 | 1 season, 22 episodes | 12–23 min | |

=== Specials ===
| Title | Genre | Release | Runtime |
|---|---|---|---|
| Snoopy Presents: For Auld Lang Syne | Animation | December 10, 2021 | 38 min |
| Snoopy Presents: It's the Small Things, Charlie Brown | Animation | April 15, 2022 | 38 min |
| Snoopy Presents: To Mom (and Dad), With Love | Animation | May 6, 2022 | 38 min |
| Snoopy Presents: Lucy's School | Animation | August 12, 2022 | 38 min |
| Snoopy Presents: One-of-a-Kind Marcie | Animation | August 18, 2023 | 38 min |
| Snoopy Presents: Welcome Home, Franklin | Animation | February 16, 2024 | 38 min |
| A Carpool Karaoke Christmas | Reality | December 16, 2024 | 59 min |
| Snoopy Presents: A Summer Musical | Animation | August 15, 2025 | 40 min |
| The First Snow of Fraggle Rock | Children's puppetry | December 5, 2025 | 34 min |
| Snoopy Presents: There's No Place Like Home, Snoopy | Animation | July 31, 2026 | 31 min |
| Snoopy Presents: 12 Days of Snoopy | Animation | November 13, 2026 | 32 min |
