= Wall to Wall Media =

British television production company

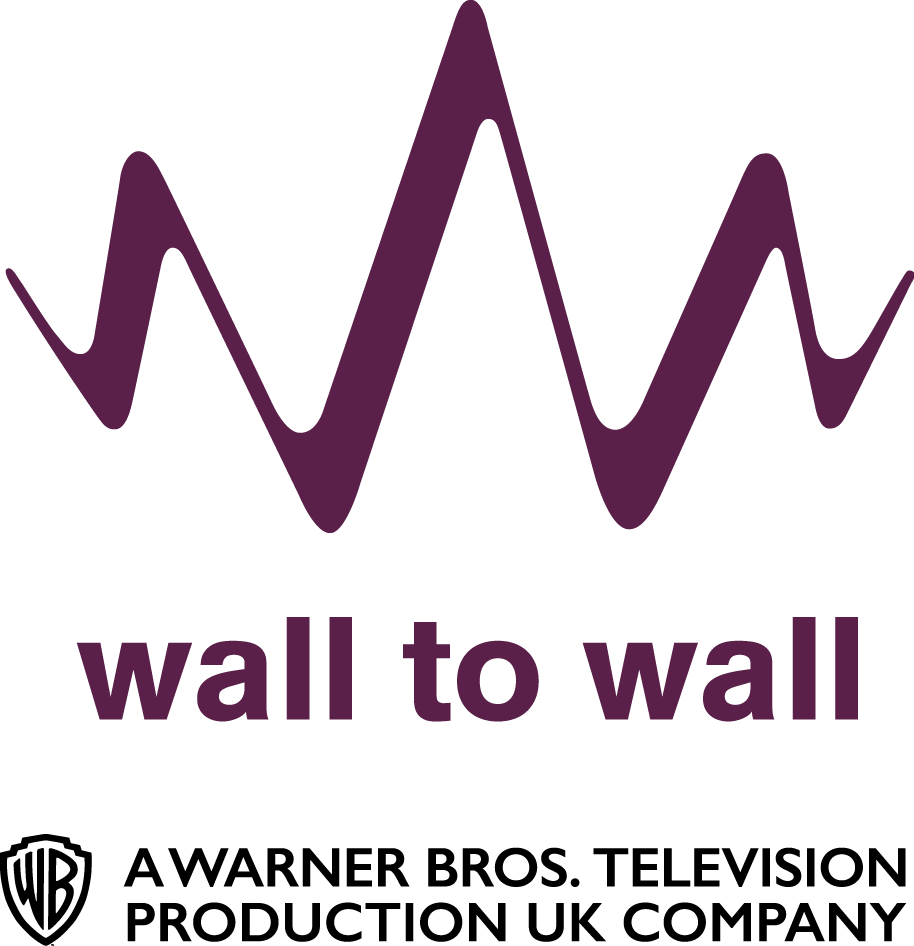
- Type: Subsidiary
- Industry: Television production
- Founded: 1987; 39 years ago, in London
- Headquarters: London, England, UK
- Key people: Leanne Klein (CEO)
- Products: The Holy Land and Us: Our Untold Stories; Child Genius; New Tricks; Who Do You Think You Are? Long Lost Family; Drugs, Inc. Underworld, Inc. UK's Best Part-Time Band; Frontier House; George Orwell: A Life in Pictures; Colonial House; The Edwardian Country House; Man on Wire; Ancient Egyptians; Smallpox 2002; The Day Britain Stopped; Back in Time for...
- Owner: Skydance Corporation
- Parent: Warner Bros. Television Studios UK (2007–present)
- Website: www.walltowall.co.uk

Wall to Wall Media, part of Warner Bros. Television Studios UK (formerly Shed Media Group), is a British television production company that produces event specials and drama, factual entertainment, science and history programmes for broadcast by networks in both the United Kingdom and United States. Its productions include Who Do You Think You Are?, New Tricks, Child Genius, and Long Lost Family.

In January 2009, Wall to Wall's first feature film Man on Wire won a BAFTA award for Outstanding British Film and followed this success with an Academy Award for Best Documentary Feature. Previously, the company had won a Peabody Award in 2000 for The 1900 House.

Wall to Wall joined the Shed Media Group in November 2007.

In July 2017, Wall to Wall Media had opened up a new regional production base & office based in Bristol called Wall to Wall West, the new West Country-based Bristol production office and division would handle Wall to Wall Media's programming state in its new Bristol production office & would focus on factual programmimg, executive producer Emily Shields had been promoted to run Wall to Wall's new Bristol production division Wall to Wall West, running the new Bristol division & production office as president while the Bristol based production office would expand to include scripted programming. Productions from Wall to Wall West include variations of the BBC Two lifestyle documentary series Back in Time for... and The World's Most Extraordinary Homes.

At the start of February 2022, Wall to Wall Media expanded its scripted production services by establishing its Manchester-based production office and Northern production division that would focus on developing & producing scripted series made in the North of England, entitled Wall to Wall North, Sian Palfrey have been appointed by Wall to Wall Media to head its new Manchester-based scripted production arm, the first programme to be made from Wall to Wall's new Northern-based production arm in Manchester was the revival of Waterloo Road.

Wall to Wall was one of the first production companies to win a factual commission from Apple TV+ with its series Becoming You, which premiered on 13 November 2020.

The company's name derives from negative references made in the mid-1980s, by then BBC Director-General Alasdair Milne and in the title of a book by Financial Times journalist Chris Dunkley, to "wall-to-wall Dallas" as a possible after-effect of the coming deregulation of UK broadcasting. Future BBC2 controller Jane Root, among the company's founders, considered this a negative, puritanical and conservative view of the medium's possibilities (ref. NME, 17 May 1986) and the name "Wall to Wall Television" was adopted as a conscious celebration of the medium, which its founders considered the "establishment" of the time to be frightened of.

== Programming ==
=== Current productions ===
- Long Lost Family: six series for ITV- total 43 episodes with more in production.
- Back in Time For...: five series for BBC Two – total 22 episodes, with more in production.
- Child Genius: four series plus a documentary, Celebrity Special and a "Five Years On" special for Channel 4 – total 18 episodes with more in production.
- Who Do You Think You Are?: twelve series plus adoption special for BBC One – total 110 episodes, with more in production.
- 500 Questions: First series for ITV.
- Waterloo Road: seven series for BBC One - total 54 episodes, with three more series in production.
- Naming the Dead: Six episode series on Disney+, renewal pending.

=== Filmography ===
Title	Years	Network	Notes
The Media Show	1987	Channel 4	
The Human Face	1991	BBC One	
A Statement of Affairs	1993	ITV	co-production with Carlton Television
Plotlands	1997	BBC One	
All Mod Cons	1997	BBC Two	
Body Story	1998–2000	Channel 4; Discovery Channel (United States)	
Sex, Chips & Rock n' Roll	1999	BBC One	
Naked Planet	1999–2000	Channel 4	
The 1900 House	1999–2000	Channel 4 PBS	
The 1940s House	2001		
The Wedding Planner	2001	Living TV	
One Hit Wonderland	2002	Discovery Channel	
Ancient Egyptians	2003–2004	Channel 4	co-production with Granada International, Warner Home Video and HarperCollins
Joe Millionaire UK	2003–2004	E4	co-production with Fox World
Regency House Party	2004	Channel 4	
Spymaster USA	2004	TLC	
The Pioneer House	2004	Channel 4; WNET (United States)	Also known as Colonial House
Who Do You Think You Are?	2004–present	BBC Two/BBC One	
Not Forgotten	2005–2009	Channel 4	
Waterloo Road	2006–present	BBC One	continued from Shed Productions and Headstrong Pictures co-production with Rope Ladder Fiction
Against All Odds	2007	National Geographic; Discovery Channel Canada	co-production with Barna Alper Productions
Surviving Disaster	2009	Paramount Network	co-production with Spike Cable Networks
Long Lost Family	2011–present	ITV	
Italy Unpacked	2013–2015	BBC Two	
Car SOS	2013–present	National Geographic UK	continued from Renegade Pictures
Child Genius	2013–present	Channel 4	
The Art of Australia	2013	BBC Four	co-production with Serendipity Productions
The Voice: Louder on Two	2014	BBC Two	co-production with Talpa
Secrets from the Clink	2014	ITV	
Secrets from the Asylum	2014	ITV	
Back in Time for...	2015–2022	BBC Two	
First Peoples	2015	PBS	co-production with Arte France
Time Crashers	2015	Channel 4	co-production with GroupM Entertainment
UK's Best Part-Time Band	2016	BBC Four	
500 Questions	2016	ITV	
Lawless Oceans	2017	National Geographic	
Little Big Shots	2017–2018	ITV	
The Sweet Makers	2017	BBC Two	
Mysteries of the Missing	2017	Science Channel	
Dope	2017–2019	Netflix	
Rome Unpacked	2018	BBC Two	
100 Years Younger in 10 Days	2018	ITV	
Churchill's Secret Agents: The New Recruits	2018	BBC Two; Netflix	
Nadiya's Asian Odyssey	2018	BBC Two	
The Twinstitute	2019	BBC Two	
Glow Up: Britain's Next Make-Up Star	2019–present	BBC Three	
The Yorkshire Ripper Files: A Very British Crime Story	2019	BBC Four	
Best Room Wins	2019	Bravo	co-production with Shed Media and Bravo Media Productions
Nature's Strangest Mysteries: Solved	2019	Animal Planet	
Narcoworld: Dope Stories	2019	Netflix	
Man in Room 301	2019	Elisa Viihde	co-production with Warner Bros. ITVP Finland and Inkas Film & T.V. Productions
Nadiya Bakes	2020	BBC Two	
The Shipman Files: A Very British Crime Story	2020	BBC Two	
My Family, the Holocaust and Me	2020	BBC One	
Becoming You	2020	Apple TV+	
Alien Worlds	2020	Netflix	
Narco Wars	2020–2022	National Geographic	
21 Day Body Turnaround with Michael Mosley	2021	Channel 4	
Growing Up Animal	2021	Disney+	co-production with National Geographic
Killers of the Cosmos	2021	Science Channel	
Nadiya's Fast Flavours	2021	BBC Two	
The Nilsen Files	2022	BBC Two	
Aids: The Unheared Tapes	2022–present	BBC Two	
Flordelis: A Family Crime	2022	HBO Max	
Go Hard or Go Home	2023–present	BBC Three	
The Ashley Madison Affair	2023	Hulu	co-production with ABC News Studios
Lucy Worsley's Victorian Murder Club	2026	BBC Two	
Buried with Michael Sheen	2026	BBC Two	co-production with Smoke Trial Productions

- The Media Show (1987, Channel 4)
- The Human Face (1991 BBC One)
- A Statement of Affairs (1992, ITV1)
- You Me and It (1992, BBC)
- New Nightmares (1992, Channel 4)
- Fellini Film Talk (1992, Channel 4)
- Dark Horses (1992, Channel 4)
- For Love Or Money (1992, Channel 4)
- Grow Your Greens, Eat Your Greens (1992, Channel 4)
- Big City (1993, ITV1)
- Claws, Jaws & Dinosaurs (1993, Channel 4)
- Baby It's You (TV Series) (1994, Channel 4/The Learning Channel)
- The Great Ape Trial (1995, Channel 4)
- The Real X-Files (1995, Channel 4/Discovery Channel)
- Down by the River (1995, ITV Meridian)
- Heartland (1995, ITV 1)
- Slice of Life (BBC Two)
- Sophie's Meat Course (1995, Channel 4)
- The Big Country (1995, BBC Scotland)
- Plotlands (1996, BBC One)
- Human Jungle / Glass Jungle (1996, Channel 4)
- Lyddie (1996, BBC)
- Spymaster (1996, Discovery Channel)
- The Agenda (1996, ITV1)
- Weekly Planet (1996, Channel 4)
- Our Boy (1997, BBC One)
- It's Not Unusual (1997, BBC Two)
- Loss of Innocence (1997, Channel 4)
- Super Twins (1997, TLC)
- Taste of the Times (1997, Channel 4)
- The Science of Sex (1997, The Learning Channel)
- All Mod Cons (1997, BBC Two)
- Bumping The Odds (1997, BBC One)
- A Rather English Marriage (1998, BBC One)
- Sex Chips and Rock & Roll (1998, BBC One)
- St. Paul's (1998, BBC One)
- Body Story (1998, Discovery Channel)
- Children of the Divorce (1998, BBC One)
- Into Africa (1998, PBS)
- Into the Flames (1998, Channel 5)
- What Granny Did in the War (1999, Channel 4)
- What Shall We Do with the Moon (1999, Channel 4)
- Standing Tall (1999, Channel 4/The Learning Channel)
- Ready to Wear (1998, BBC Two)
- Paleoworld (1999, Discovery Channel, TLC)
- Naked Planet (1999, Channel 4/PBS)
- An Animal's World (1999, Channel 4)
- Deluge (1999, Channel 4, TLC)
- Standing Tall / World's Tallest People (1999, Channel 4/TLC)
- What Shall We Do with the Moon? (1999, Channel 4)
- The 1900 House (1999–2000 Channel 4) PBS
- Stressed Out (2000, Channel 4)
- Marrying Out (2000, Channel 4)
- Building The Biggest (2000, Channel 4/TLC)
- Glasgow Kiss (2000, BBC One)
- Rosemary: Castle Cook (2000, Channel 5)
- When Money Went Mad: The Story of the South Sea Bubble (2000, Channel 4)
- Salvage Squad I (2001, Channel 4)
- Science of Beauty (2001, TLC)
- Real Football (2001, Discovery Channel)
- A Child's World (2001, Discovery Channel)
- Cromwell: New Model Englishman (2001, Channel 4)
- Neanderthal (TV series) (2001, Channel 4/Discovery Channel)
- Enduring Extremes (2001, Discovery Channel)
- Eurocops (2001, Discovery Channel)
- Sex Life (2001, BBC Two)
- Extinct (2001, Channel 4)
- Gunpowder, Treason and Plot (2001, Channel 4)
- Health Cops I: Sentenced to Health (2001, Channel 4)
- Rosemary on the Road (2001, Channel 5)
- The Wedding Planner (2001, Sky Living)
- Muslims in America (2001, Discovery Channel)
- Salvage Squad II (2002, Channel 4)
- One Hit Wonderland (2002, Discovery Channel)
- Cleopatra (2002, Channel 4)
- Frontier House (2002, PBS)
- Giant Monsters (2003, Animal Planet)
- Health Cops II & III: New Orleans & Health Cops Undercover (2002, Discovery Health)
- Ice World (2002, Discovery Channel/Channel 4)
- Outbreak (2002, Discovery Health)
- Real Boxing (2002, Discovery Channel)
- The 1940s House (2002, Channel 4/PBS)
- The Day Britain Stopped (2002, BBC Two)
- World's First Predator (2002, Discovery Channel)
- The Edwardian Country House (2002, Channel 4/PBS)
- Treats from the Edwardian Country House (2002, Channel 4)
- Outbreak (2002, Discovery Health/Alliance Atlantis)
- Art Crime (2002, BBC Four/Bravo)
- Chariot Race (2002, Channel 4/TLC)
- Smallpox 2002 (2002, BBC Two)
- Scribbling (2002, BBC Two)
- Salvage Squad III (2003, Channel 4)
- Ancient Egyptians (TV series) (2003, Channel 4)
- Five Things I Hate About You (2003, BBC Two)
- Life Beyond the Box: Norman Stanley Fletcher (2003, BBC Two)
- Life Beyond the Box: Margo Leadbetter (2003, BBC)
- George Orwell: A Life in Pictures (2003, BBC Two)
- Global Medics (2003, Discovery Channel)
- Joe Millionaire UK (2003, Channel 4)
- Spymaster USA (2003, Discovery Channel)
- Tournament (2003, Channel 4)
- First Columbus (2004, Discovery Channel)
- Who Do You Think You Are? (2004–present, BBC One)
- Secret Admirer (2004, Channel 4)
- New Tricks (2004–2014, BBC One)
- Rosemary: Queen of the Kitchen (2004, Discovery Home & Leisure)
- Pioneer House (2004, Channel 4)
- Colonial House (2004, WNET)
- Spy (2004, BBC)
- The Story of Us (2004, Discovery Health)
- Salvage Squad (2004, Channel 4)
- The Regency House Party (2004, Channel 4/WNET)
- Spy (2004, BBC Three)
- We've Got the Builders In (2004, BBC Two)
- Agatha Christie: A Life in Pictures (2004, BBC Two)
- The Man Who Broke Britain (2004, BBC One)
- Child Genius Documentary (2005, Channel 4)
- Oil Storm (2005, FX)
- The Mafia (2005, Five/National Geographic Channel)
- Not Forgotten (2005, Channel 4)
- The Reclaimers (2005, BBC Two)
- Ian Fleming: Bondmaker(2005, BBC One)
- Things I Hate About You USA (Bravo)
- Your Money Or Your Wife (2006, Channel 4)
- Texas Ranch House (2006, Channel 4/PBS)
- 100% English (2006, Channel 4)
- Underworld Histories (2006–2011, National Geographic Channel)
- The Battle That Made Britain (2006, BBC Four)
- H. G. Wells: War with the World (2006, BBC Two)
- Elizabeth David: A Life in Recipes (2006, BBC Two)
- Saving Ronald Reagan (2006, Discovery Channel)
- Outlaw Bikers (2007, National Geographic Channel)
- Empire's Children (2007, Channel 4)
- Building the Future (2007, Discovery Channel)
- You Don't Know You're Born (2007, ITV1)
- HD Atlas: France (2007, Discovery Channel)
- Crisis at the Castle (2007, BBC Two)
- Coal House (2007–2008, BBC One Wales)
- Filth: The Mary Whitehouse Story (2008, BBC Two)
- Man on Wire (2008, Discovery Channel/BBC)
- The First New Heart / Beating Death (2007, Channel 4/Discovery Channel)
- The Genius of Photography (2007, BBC Two)
- You Don't Know You're Born (2007, ITV1)
- Crashes That Changed Flying: Aviation Safety (2008, Discovery Channel)
- 10 Commandments of the Mafia (2008, Discovery Channel)
- Dispatches (2008, Channel 4)
- Oligart (2008, Channel 4)
- The Man Who Ate Everything: The Alan Davidson Story (2008, BBC Four)
- Backstairs Billy (2009, Channel 4)
- My Life in Verse (2009, BBC Two)
- Neanderthal Code (2009, National Geographic)
- Sea Patrol UK I (2009, National Geographic)
- Who Killed Scarlett? (2009, Channel 4)
- Electric Dreams, (2009, BBC Four)
- Surviving Terror (2009, Spike)
- Not Forgotten: Soldiers of Empire (2009, Channel 4)
- Anatomy of a Takedown (2009, Discovery Channel)
- Outlaw Biker Women (2009, National Geographic)
- Crack House USA (2010, MSNBC)
- Turn Back Time: The High Street (2010, BBC One)
- Dispatches Special: Bravo's Deadly Mission (2010, Channel 4)
- The Young Ones (2010, BBC One)
- Drugs, Inc. (2010–2015, National Geographic)
- The Genius of Design (2010, BBC Two)
- Stone Age Atlantis (2010, National Geographic)
- That's Britain! (2011, BBC One)
- Mayday Mayday (2011, ITV1)
- Black in Latin America (2011, PBS)
- Petworth House: The Big Spring Clean (2011, BBC Four)
- The Great Estate: The Rise and Fall of the Council House (2011, BBC Four)
- Wicked Pirate City (2011, National Geographic)
- The People's Supermarket (2011, Channel 4)
- Arthur's Hell on High Water (2011, Channel 4)
- Long Lost Family (2011–present, ITV)
- The Girl (2012, BBC Two/HBO)
- The Trouble With Aid (2012, BBC Four)
- Goodnight Britain (2012, BBC One)
- The House The 50s Built (2012, Channel 4)
- Turn Back Time: The Family (2012, BBC One)
- Arts Troubleshooter (2012, BBC Two)
- Sicily Unpacked (2012, BBC Two)
- The Art of Australia (2013, BBC Four)
- That Music Show (2013, Channel 4)
- The People's Medal (2013, ITV1)
- Child Genius (2013–present, Channel 4)
- Nature's Newborns (2013, ITV1)
- Secrets from the Workhouse (2013, ITV1)
- The Voice UK (2012–2016, BBC One)
- Italy Unpacked (2013–present, BBC Two)
- Wanted: A Family Of My Own (2014, ITV1)
- Births, Deaths and Marriages (2014, ITV1)
- Who Do They Think They Are?: 10 Years, 100 Shows (2014, BBC One)
- Secrets from the Clink (2014, ITV1)
- Secrets from the Asylum (2014, ITV1)
- Drugs, Inc. – Dealers' POV (2014, National Geographic)
- Back in Time For Christmas (2015, BBC Two)
- Underworld Inc. (2015–present, National Geographic)
- Time Crashers (2015, Channel 4)
- First Peoples (2015, PBS)
- The Scandalous Lady W (2015, BBC Two)
- Back in Time for Dinner (2015, BBC Two)
- The Gift (2015, BBC One)
- Bring Back Borstal (2015, ITV1)
- UK's Best Part-Time Band (2016, BBC Two/BBC Four)
- Back in Time for the Weekend (2016, BBC Two)
- Victorian Bakers (2016, BBC Two)
- Bus Pass Beauty Queens (2016, Channel 5)
- Long Lost Family Series 6 (2016, ITV)
- 500 Questions (2016, ITV)
- The Victorian Slum (2016, BBC Two)
- Child Genius vs Celebrities: SU2C Special (2016, Channel Four)
- Back in Time For Brixton (2016, BBC Two)
- Six Wives With Lucy Worsley (2016, BBC One)
- Victorian Bakers at Christmas (2016, BBC Two)
- The World's Most Extraordinary Homes (2017, BBC Two/Netflix)
- Further Back in Time For Dinner (2017, BBC Two)
- Lawless Oceans (2017, National Geographic Channel)
- Little Big Shots (2017, ITV)
- Me and My Dog: The Ultimate Contest (2017, BBC Two)
- Long Lost Family: What Happened Next (2017, ITV)
- The Sweet Makers (2017, BBC Two)
- Long Lost Family 7 (2017, ITV)
- My Family, Partition & Me (2017, BBC One)
- Mysteries of the Missing (2017)
- Blitz: The Bombs that Changed Britain (2017, BBC Two)
- The Sweet Makers at Christmas (2017, BBC Two)
- Dope (2017, Netflix)
- Child Genius vs Celebrities Christmas Special (2017, Channel 4)
- Rome Unpacked (2018, BBC Two)
- Back in Time for Tea (2018, BBC Two)
- Churchill's Secret Agents: The New Recruits (2018, BBC Two/Netflix)
- 100 Years Younger in 21 Days (2018, Channel 4)
- The Ruth Ellis Files: A Very British Crime Story (2018, BBC Four)
- Glow Up: Britain's Next Make-Up Star (2019, BBC Three)
- Alien Worlds (2020, Netflix)
- Becoming You (2020, Apple TV+)
- Aids: The Unheared Tapes (2022, BBC Two)
- Flordelis: A Family Crime (2022, HBO Max)
- Go Hard or Go Home (2023 -, BBC Three)
- Lucy Worsley's Victorian Murder Club (2026, BBC Two)
- Buried with Michael Sheen (2026, BBC)
