= The Outrun (soundtrack) =

The Outrun (Original Motion Picture Soundtrack)

Film score by John Gürtler and Jan Miserre
- Released: 13 September 2024
- Recorded: 2023–2024
- Studio: Bonello Studio, Berlin
- Genre: Film score
- Length: 43:27
- Label: Decca
- Producer: John Gürtler; Jan Miserre

John Gürtler and Jan Miserre chronology
| Für Jojo (2022) | The Outrun (2024) | Berlin ER (2025) |

The Outrun (Original Motion Picture Soundtrack) is the soundtrack album to the 2024 film The Outrun directed by Nora Fingscheidt starring Saoirse Ronan. The film score is composed by John Gürtler and Jan Miserre and released through Decca Records on 13 September 2024.

== Development ==
In December 2023, it was announced that would compose the score for The Outrun; Gürtler had previously worked with Fingscheidt on System Crasher (2019), for which he won the European Film Award. Gürtler said that the novel had no clear story arc, but was inspiring in a musical level as the main character was fascinated by nature, Norse myths and cosmos having expressive ideas while on the other hand, elements of addiction and mental health also being poles apart. The contrast in those two elements really informed a lot of the music, which they wrote before the film's shooting had commenced.

The duo composed few musical pieces before production began so that they can use those pieces on set and allowed them to play it during filming and let the actors immerse in the work environment. Gürtler and Miserre refrained watching footages of the film's production and allow their creativity flow while crafting the music. They admitted that film scoring provided the opportunity to create art that stands on its own and combined with other artforms, which becomes gesamtkunstwerk (transl. total artwork).

The duo recalled a scene where Rona is tempted by a glass of red wine, where the glass sound resonated, as if the glass is talking to her, and she drinks the wine, and the glass is broken. They felt that it was a starting point to incorporate ambient instruments which can relate to the ideas of cosmos, science and myths, but also exploring deep into Rona's vulnerability. The piece "The Long Way Home", which Fingscheidt referred to as the "weather concept", was considered as the challenging pieces they had written. For composing the piece, Fingscheidt gave the reference of Mickey Mouse as the Sorcerer’s Apprentice in Fantasia (1940). The piece had to be written before the shoot, so that Saoirse Ronan could have a conducting lesson with Robert Ames of the London Contemporary Orchestra.

The composers used ancient instruments such as the ondes martenot and cristal baschet, for the ongoing and evolving themes. Both instruments were played by French musician Thomas Bloch. For the strong theme of nature in the film, they used strings, woodwinds and experimented with different flutes and a double bass clarinet. Much of the score were recorded in his own studio, where the duo played their own instruments. Cellist Tim Struble recorded his portions in his studio at the south of Germany and sent those recordings to the composers for mixing. Some of the recordings were recorded at the Bonello Studio in Berlin.

== Reception ==
David Rooney of The Hollywood Reporter noted that the score complimented the storytelling. David Sexton of New Statesman wrote "A terrific surging score by John Gürtler and Jan Miserre picks up the sounds of the storms and the waves, to make a rhapsody, startlingly distinct from the drum and bass Rona loves." Katherine McLaughlin of Little White Lies wrote "Hazy drunkenness and emotional confrontations are accompanied with blasts of music (provided by John Gürtler and Jan Miserre) and natural sounds". Richard Lawson of Vanity Fair wrote "swelling, lovely score".

== Track listing ==
| No. | Title | Length |
|---|---|---|
| 1. | "Dance of the Selkies" | 2:29 |
| 2. | "Orkney" | 2:10 |
| 3. | "Arise (Inland Version)" | 1:50 |
| 4. | "Beyond the Noise" | 1:44 |
| 5. | "Never Again" | 2:52 |
| 6. | "It Could All Just Be in Your Head" | 2:19 |
| 7. | "Corncrake" | 3:15 |
| 8. | "Ring of Brodgar" | 2:13 |
| 9. | "A Call from Dad" | 2:00 |
| 10. | "Selkie Swimming" | 2:09 |
| 11. | "They Belong to the Sea" | 2:23 |
| 12. | "Have You Ever Felt Like You Could Control the Weather?" | 1:23 |
| 13. | "The Tremors" | 2:01 |
| 14. | "Cravings" | 1:42 |
| 15. | "The Long Way Home" | 4:37 |
| 16. | "One with the Wind" | 1:54 |
| 17. | "Gyro Nights" | 3:35 |
| 18. | "Tides of Surrender" | 2:51 |
| Total length: | | 43:27 |

== Release history ==
Release history and formats for The Outrun (Original Motion Picture Soundtrack)
| Region | Date | Format(s) | Label(s) | Ref. |
|---|---|---|---|---|
| Various | 13 September 2024 | Digital download; streaming | Decca Records | |
| Various | 27 September 2024 | CD | Decca Records | |
| Various | 27 December 2024 | LP | Decca Records | |

== Accolades ==
| Award | Ceremony date | Category | Recipient(s) | Result | Ref. |
|---|---|---|---|---|---|
| British Independent Film Awards | 8 December 2024 | Best Original Music | John Gürtler and Jan Miserre | Nominated | |
