= Body Story =

- Genre: Documentary
- Narrated by: Terry McDonald
- Original language: English
- No. of series: 2
- No. of episodes: 12

Production
- Running time: about 45 minutes
- Production company: Wall to Wall

Original release
- Network: Channel 4, Discovery Channel
- Release: 1998 – 2001

Body Story is a mini-series produced by Wall to Wall and distributed by Channel 4 and Discovery Channel. The series aired in two seasons 1998 and 2001. Combining real-life acting and computer-generated imagery, it shows the processes going on inside the human body in our daily life as well as facing dramatic experiences, in a docufictional style.

The series covers body processes such as basic instincts, learning, immune system, puberty, pregnancy, immune system and recovering.

== Season 1 ==
=== Under pressure ===
45 year old man has heart attack

=== The cold war ===
Bicycle courier slash singer gets a visit from Influenza B

=== Breaking Down ===
Young girl breaks arm falling off a bicycle

=== Basic Instinct ===
Sleazy man gets drunk

=== The Takeover ===
Marion Swift struggles with the various stages of pregnancy with the help of her husband, Ian.

=== Shut down ===
Life reaches its end for an elderly Typewriter enthusiast. The episode is replayed as the final episode of season 2.

== Season 2 ==
=== Teen dreams ===
The episode follows neighborhood children Darren and Natalie, as they grow through the stages of puberty. The first scene shows Darren and Natalie as 8 year old kids frolicking in their backyard. The time is fast forwarded five years, to when both children are 13 years old. Scenes shot in a third person perspective follow Darren and Natalie through the changes of puberty, including: pimples, the first period, the growth of sperm, and the growth spurts that both children go through. All of the changes during puberty result in sexual attraction towards each other, and culminates during a Romeo and Juliet play in which Darren and Natalie share a kiss.

=== Brave new world ===
How a baby's mind develops after being born.

=== Fat attack ===
How people gain and lose weight.

=== Allergy ===
A woman is stung by a wasp and suffers an allergic reaction.

=== Bad taste ===
A man suffers from salmonella.

=== Crash ===
A couple experience a car crash.

== Awards ==
The first season won a silver medal for Television Film in the 1999 BMA Awards.

== International broadcasts ==
Country/region	Channel
Serbia	B92
Spain	RTVE
Sweden	SVT
United States	Discovery Channel
