= Not Forgotten (TV series) =

- Genre: Documentary
- Presented by: Ian Hislop
- Country of origin: United Kingdom
- Original language: English
- No. of seasons: 1
- No. of episodes: 7

Production
- Production company: Wall to Wall

Original release
- Network: Channel 4
- Release: 20 November 2005 – 9 November 2009

Not Forgotten is a British television documentary series made by Wall to Wall for Channel 4. Written and presented by Ian Hislop, the series examines the impact on British society of the First World War. The series' tie-in website was nominated for a BAFTA Award for Best Interactivity in 2006.

The original series comprised four episodes, broadcast from 20 November to 11 December 2005:

- Commemoration, examining the movement for war memorials following the First World War, and the continuation of this tradition for subsequent conflicts.
- Class, looking at the way the British class system was reflected and challenged by the creation of a mass army.
- Women, discussing how women's roles and expectations in society changed as a result of the war.
- Survivors, examining how society dealt with those who returned from the war injured and disabled.

A tie-in book, Not Forgotten, written by Neil Oliver, was published by Hodder & Stoughton.

Three additional episodes were subsequently produced:

- Shot at Dawn, examining the stories of men shot for desertion and cowardice (first aired on 2 January 2007).
- The Men Who Wouldn't Fight, challenging the stigma attached to conscientious objectors (first aired on 10 November 2008). This episode featured, amongst others, the story of Ronald Skirth, who became a conscientious objector while serving in the Royal Artillery.
- Soldiers of Empire, examining the motivation and role of volunteers from the British Empire in the First World War (first aired on 9 November 2009).
