= Smallpox 2002 =

2002 British docudrama

- Also known as: Smallpox 2002: Silent Weapon
- Genre: Docudrama
- Written by: Simon Chinn; Daniel Percival
- Directed by: Daniel Percival
- Starring: Bolen High; Leigh Zimmerman; Tara Hugo
- Narrated by: Brian Cox
- Composer: Andy Price
- Country of origin: United Kingdom
- Original language: English

Production
- Executive producer: Jonathan Hewes
- Producer: Simon Chinn
- Running time: 90 minutes

Original release
- Network: BBC Two
- Release: 5 February 2002

Smallpox 2002: Silent Weapon is a fictional docudrama produced by Wall to Wall, showing how a single act of bioterrorism leads to terrifying consequences globally.

== Background ==
The premise of it was one man who, in 2002, creates the smallpox virus himself, infects himself, and touches ten people in New York City. This eventually leads to a pandemic across the world that is later defeated, but not before 60 million people are killed.

The film was commissioned before the September 11 attacks and is presented in the form of a fictional documentary, including false interviews and stock footage. The tagline for the movie was, "Drama, until it happens".

== Reception ==
Newspaper reviews of the documentary were mixed, varying from "a sick stunt" to "extraordinarily good". The docudrama proved very popular with viewers, attracting 3.4m viewers, 15% of the audience, to a 9:00pm slot on BBC2 according to overnight returns.

== Notes ==
- The film was renamed Smallpox when it aired on FX on 2 January 2005.
