= Earth at Night in Color =

US nature documentary television series

- Promotional poster
- Genre: Nature documentary
- Directed by: Simon Muriel; Tom Payne; Joe Stevens; Justin Anderson
- Narrated by: Tom Hiddleston
- Country of origin: United States
- Original language: English
- No. of seasons: 2
- No. of episodes: 12

Production
- Executive producers: Alex Williamson; Isla Robertson
- Running time: 30 minutes
- Production company: Offspring Films

Original release
- Network: Apple TV+
- Release: December 4, 2020 – April 16, 2021

Earth at Night in Color (or Earth at Night in Colour in Europe) is an American-Britsh nature documentary television series created by Offspring Films and narrated by Tom Hiddleston. The series premiered on December 4, 2020 on Apple TV+, with a second season premiering on April 16, 2021.

== Premise ==
Using specialized low-light cameras, Earth At Night In Color shows the nocturnal behaviors of animals across different continents around the world.

== Episodes ==
=== Series overview ===
Season	Episodes	Originally released
1	6	December 4, 2020
2	6	April 16, 2021

=== Season 1 (2020) ===
No. overall	No. in season	Title	Directed by	Original release date
1	1	"Lion Grasslands"	Simon Muriel	December 4, 2020
In Kenya's Maasai Mara grasslands, a lioness searches for her cubs in the dark.
2	2	"Tarsier Forest"	Tom Payne	December 4, 2020
As darkness falls, a family of tiny primates in Sulawesi venture into the jungle to find food while protecting their babies.
3	3	"Jaguar Jungle"	Joe Stevens	December 4, 2020
A jaguar fights to keep his river home in Brazil at night.
4	4	"Bear Woodlands"	Tom Payne	December 4, 2020
In a boreal forest of Europe, a brown bear clashes with wolves and tries to find a mate.
5	5	"Wild Cities"	Justin Anderson	December 4, 2020
When Los Angeles, Chicago, and Toronto light-up at night, there are opportunities for clever animals.
6	6	"Cheetah Plains"	Simon Muriel	December 4, 2020
In Kenya's Maasai Mara, two cheetahs attempt a high-speed night hunt with hyenas following.

=== Season 2 (2021) ===
No. overall	No. in season	Title	Directed by	Original release date
7	1	"Elephant Plains"	Simon Muriel	April 16, 2021
African elephants search for water, but darkness leaves them vulnerable.
8	2	"Puma Mountain"	Joe Stevens	April 16, 2021
A puma in the Patagonian mountains learns to survive without her mother.
9	3	"Kangaroo Valley"	Tom Payne	April 16, 2021
In the Australian night, kangaroos evade a pack of dingoes.
10	4	"Coral Reef"	Joe Stevens	April 16, 2021
A coral reef world transforms. Hidden hunters and natural wonders emerge from the dark.
11	5	"Seal Coast"	Justin Anderson	April 16, 2021
On Namibia's Skeleton Coast, a seal pup left alone survives jackals and hyena ambushes.
12	6	"Polar Bear Winter"	Robin Dimbleby	April 16, 2021
A polar bear leads her cubs through the cold, long arctic winter.

== Production ==
Earth At Night In Color was announced on August 26, 2020, along with the rest of the late-2020 docuseries lineup being released by Apple TV+, including Long Way Up, Tiny World, and Becoming You. The six-episode first season was released on December 4, 2020, and the second six-episode season was released on April 16, 2021.
