= Little Big Shots (British TV series) =

- Also known as: Little Big Shots UK
- Genre: Children; Talk show; Talent show
- Created by: Ellen DeGeneres; Steve Harvey
- Based on: Little Big Shots by Ellen DeGeneres and Steve Harvey
- Written by: Lee Stuart Evans; Alan Connor
- Directed by: Liz Clare (1); Ollie Bartlett (2)
- Creative director: Liam Lunniss
- Presented by: Dawn French
- Country of origin: United Kingdom
- Original language: English Mandarin Chinese
- No. of seasons: 2
- No. of episodes: 12

Production
- Producers: Andy Rowe; Emma Taylor
- Production location: BBC Studioworks
- Editors: Dominic Bell; Scott Edwards; Matt Pratt; Mike Brierly
- Camera setup: Multiple
- Running time: 60 minutes (inc. adverts)
- Production company: Wall to Wall Warner Bros. International Television Production

Original release
- Network: ITV
- Release: 1 March 2017 – 27 May 2018

Related
- Little Big Shots

Little Big Shots (also known as Little Big Shots with Dawn French) is a British television talent show that premiered on ITV on 1 March 2017 and ended on 27 May 2018. The series is hosted by Dawn French and based on the American show of the same name created by Ellen DeGeneres and Steve Harvey who was also the host of the original. The series is produced by Wall to Wall. In June 2017, it was confirmed it would return for a second series, also with six episodes.

== Format ==
The show, unlike shows such as The X Factor, has no judges, winners or losers. In each episode, Dawn French talks to a 3– to 13-year-old child about their talent, before the child performs it in front of a studio audience. Some talents shown include singing, dancing, cooking and karate.

== Transmissions ==
Series	Episodes	Originally released	
Series	Episodes	First released	Last released
1	6	1 March 2017	12 April 2017
2	6	22 April 2018	27 May 2018

=== Series 1 (2017) ===
No. overall	No. in season	Title	Original release date	Prod. code
1	1	"Episode #1.1"	1 March 2017	101
2	2	"Episode #1.2"	8 March 2017	102
3	3	"Episode #1.3"	15 March 2017	103
4	4	"Episode #1.4"	29 March 2017	104
5	5	"Episode #1.5"	5 April 2017	105
6	6	"Episode #1.6"	12 April 2017	106

=== Series 2 (2018) ===
No. overall	No. in season	Title	Original release date	Prod. code
7	1	"Episode #2.1"	22 April 2018	201
8	2	"Episode #2.2"	28 April 2018	202
9	3	"Episode #2.3"	6 May 2018	203
10	4	"Episode #2.4"	13 May 2018	204
11	5	"Episode #2.5"	20 May 2018	205
12	6	"Episode #2.6"	27 May 2018	206

== Reception ==
Little Big Shots received mixed reviews. Viewers said that the show "lifted the spirit" and "[was a] ray of sunshine". Tim Dowling from The Guardian said "Little Big Shots appears to be the kind of cheap and cheerful fare designed to be broken into viral chunks and slapped up on YouTube afterwards: heartwarming moments from a sickly-sweet box of delights."
