= You Don't Know You're Born =

- Genre: Documentary
- Starring: Various
- Country of origin: United Kingdom
- Original language: English
- No. of series: 1
- No. of episodes: 3

Production
- Running time: 60 minutes (including adverts)
- Production company: Wall to Wall Media

Original release
- Network: ITV
- Release: 23 January – 6 February 2007

You Don't Know You're Born is a British television documentary series that aired on ITV from 23 January to 6 February 2007. It features celebrities looking into their family tree.

== Background ==
You Don't Know You're Born follows in the wake of the successful BBC programme Who Do You Think You Are?. Both shows are made by Wall to Wall. You Don't Know You're Born shows celebrities tracing their family tree and then travelling to where their ancestors lived and doing the jobs they did. It is narrated by Barbara Flynn. The show was cancelled after three episodes due to wide criticism for it being basically a clone of its BBC counterpart.

== Episodes ==
#	Airdate	Celebrity	Overview
1	23 January 2007	Anne Kirkbride	Anne Kirkbride works as a photographer in Oldham then as a ploughman in County Galway in Ireland.
2	30 January 2007	Alan Davies	Alan Davies works as a bricklayer in London and then recreates a 1907 Freemason dinner in the City.
3	6 February 2007	Ken Stott	Ken Stott works a tailor in Aberfeldy, a baker in Crieff and a fisher and market trader in Trapani, Sicily.
