= Ancient Egyptians (TV series) =

Television series

- Genre: Drama
- Country of origin: United Kingdom
- Original language: English
- No. of series: 1
- No. of episodes: 4

Production
- Executive producers: Alex Graham; Gina Cronk
- Producer: Ben Goold
- Running time: 196 minutes
- Production companies: Wall to Wall Media; Granada International; HarperCollins; Warner Home Video

Original release
- Release: 2003 – 2004

Ancient Egyptians is a four-part dramatic miniseries exploring life in the land of the pharaohs of Egypt at the time of the great dynasties. The series was broadcast on Channel 4 and cost £6 million. Their stories, which span 1,500 years, unfold against the backdrop of great events in the kingdom's history and paint intimate and dramatic portraits of a rich and complex society. In recreating these ancient stories, the characters' real words and thoughts are used wherever possible, in the ancient Egyptian language. Costume and design are based on meticulous research into the wealth of real material that has survived from ancient Egypt at different periods.
