= A Statement of Affairs =

- Genre: Thriller
- Written by: Eric Deacon
- Directed by: Colin Gregg
- Starring: Frances Barber; David Threlfall; Adrian Dunbar; Lesley Manville; Rosalind Bennett; Dorian Healy
- Composer: Hal Lindes
- Country of origin: United Kingdom
- Original language: English
- No. of series: 1
- No. of episodes: 3

Production
- Producers: Jane Root; Rebecca O'Brien
- Cinematography: Derek Suter
- Running time: 60 minutes
- Production companies: Carlton Television; Wall to Wall Television

Original release
- Network: ITV
- Release: 8 March – 9 March 1993

A Statement of Affairs is a three-part British television psychological thriller, written by Eric Deacon and directed by Colin Gregg, that first broadcast on ITV for two consecutive nights from 8 to 9 March 1993. The series stars Frances Barber, David Threlfall, Adrian Dunbar, Lesley Manville, Rosalind Bennett and Dorian Healy as friends Pip, Alan, Adrian, Carol, Sue and Steve, who have been close friends for many years. But when one of them is murdered, hidden secrets from the past begin to emerge.

In a pre-broadcast review by The Independent, the series was described as "stylish", with writer James Rampton commenting; "Sporty yuppies who live in penthouse flats and embroil themselves in financial chicanery may seem a bit vieux jeu in the recessionary Nineties. This, however, is the backdrop to Carlton's stylish three-part psychological thriller about friendship foundering. Despite similarities with Thirtysomething (check the acoustic soundtrack) and The Big Chill, this is certainly more substantial than Carlton's last network drama offering, Head Over Heels".

== Production ==
The series was written by Eric Deacon, known for his work on The Bill and London's Burning. The Independent added that; "Deacon, being an actor, has a keen ear for dialogue. [David] Threlfall, exasperated by his unreliable car, says he is 'thinking of asking the AA man to be godfather to our next child'."

== Plot ==
Alan, Adrian and Steve have been friends since childhood. All three are happily married: Alan to Carol, Adrian to Pip and Steve to Sue. All three have good, stable jobs and lead carefree existences. But when Steve and Sue's house burns down, Pip offers to put up their children until they can find alternative accommodation. Adrian is unhappy with the situation, which causes a lethal quarrel. The pair exchange harsh words, leading Pip to declare she wants a divorce. Reeling from the argument, she opens her heart to Alan. Later that evening, Pip is found dead and the question arises, was she murdered or did she commit suicide? A further revelation occurs when Pip was discovered to have been pregnant at the time of her death.

== Cast ==
- Frances Barber as Pip
- David Threlfall as Alan
- Adrian Dunbar as Adrian
- Lesley Manville as Carol
- Rosalind Bennett as Sue
- Dorian Healy as Steve
- Francesca Folan
- Mo Sesay
