= Dope (TV series) =

2017 documentary television series

- Genre: Documentary
- Narrated by: Ronan Summers; Michael Beach
- Country of origin: United States
- Original languages: English; Spanish; Dutch
- No. of seasons: 3
- No. of episodes: 12

Production
- Executive producer: Chris Lent
- Producer: Ralph Perring
- Cinematography: Robbie Stauder; Christopher Campbell; Scott Lootens; Charlie Laing
- Running time: 35-48 minutes
- Production companies: Wall to Wall Media; Warner Bros. Television Productions UK

Original release
- Network: Netflix
- Release: December 22, 2017 – June 28, 2019

Dope is an American documentary television series that aired on Netflix from December 2017 to June 2019. The show consists of three seasons with four episodes each and revolves around the production, logistics, sale and consumption of illegal drugs. Camera teams follow law enforcement as well as users and dealers of various drugs.

== Production ==
During the shooting of an interview with three drug dealers in Beek, Netherlands for the third season of the show, local police invaded their home and arrested the men whilst the camera was rolling. According to local newspaper De Limburger, police had been monitoring one of the dealers and thus found out about the scheduled interview. The two filmmakers present were interrogated but released shortly after. According to police, firearms found on the table were fake, as was a large portion of the alleged drugs.

In January 2019, a 21-year-old man from Troy, Michigan was arrested for drug trafficking through Oakland County and surrounding communities. The Oakland County Sheriff's Office began investing the man, who operated under the pseudonym "Ozone", in July 2018 after receiving a tip. The tip also mentioned the man's engagement in the third episode of the second season of Dope. After executing search warrants on two locations, police found various amounts of different drugs and took the man into custody. He was booked on multiple drug trafficking charges, to all of which he pleaded guilty and was sentenced to 3–20 years in federal prison in June 2019.

== Episodes ==
=== Season 1 (2017) ===
No. overall	No. in season	Title	Directed by	Original release date
1	1	"America's Cup of Coffee"	Dickon Le Marchant	December 22, 2017
The episode revolves around cocaine usage in the streets of Oakland, California.
2	2	"Once You See It, You Can Never Unsee It"	Richard Mejeh	December 22, 2017
Baltimore, Maryland becomes the centerpoint of this episode as it shows its ongoing heroin epidemic, one of the worst in the country.
3	3	"Even if They Didn't Pay Me, I'd Still Do It"	Seamus Mirodan & Nonuk Walter	December 22, 2017
The episode focuses on the Sinaloa Cartel operating out of Sinaloa, Mexico and shows the typical route of marijuana from Mexico into the United States.
4	4	"Is It Dangerous? Absolutely It's Dangerous"	Ben Reid	December 22, 2017
The final episode of the first season depicts crack cocaine users and dealers in Chicago, Illinois.

=== Season 2 (2018) ===
No. overall	No. in season	Title	Directed by	Original release date
5	1	"In This Business You Have No Friends, Only Enemies"	Nonuk Walter	April 20, 2018
The first episode of the second season shows the route drug traffickers take to smuggle cocaine from South America to Miami, Florida and thus to the United States via Caribbean countries such as the Dominican Republic.
6	2	"You're Too Innocent for This Game"	Benedict Sanderson	April 20, 2018
In episode six, viewers are taken to the state of Indiana, where home-cooked methamphetamine is a real problem on the streets.
7	3	"I'm Gonna Get Me That White People Money"	George Amponsah	April 20, 2018
Detroit, Michigan has been known for its techno scene since the 1980s. The drug MDMA has been going hand in hand with underground raves for almost as long.
8	4	"Feeling Rather Groovy Like a $2 Movie"	Roeland Doust	April 20, 2018
The second season ends with an episode chronicling the life of a bounty hunter set out on drug dealers in Atlanta, Georgia.

=== Season 3 (2019) ===
No. overall	No. in season	Title	Directed by	Original release date
9	1	"The Devil's Oldest Trick"	Phil Caller & Minna Sedmakov	June 28, 2019
Camera crews examine fentanyl's impact on addicts and how overwhelmed customs agents are striving to stop the flow. Also, a Boston dealer talks money.
10	2	"God, Forgive Me for This"	Jamie Welham & Vanessa Moussa	June 28, 2019
A large shipment of cocaine is transported from rural Colombia to bustling Madrid. Smugglers beware: Police may be waiting to pounce.
11	3	"No Face, No Case"	Benedict Sanderson	June 28, 2019
As dealers and smugglers take advantage of addiction in Los Angeles, law enforcement agents search for drugs on both land and sea.
12	4	"This Isn't Miami Vice"	Joost Van der Valk	June 28, 2019
In the port city of Rotterdam in the Netherlands, cocaine kingpins employ fearsome hitmen to intimidate and silence suspected informers.
