= Drugs, Inc. =

American documentary TV series

- Directed by: Various
- Country of origin: United States
- Original language: English
- No. of seasons: 8
- No. of episodes: 72

Production
- Executive producers: Jonathan Hewes (2010–present); Chris Valentini (2010); Madeleine Carter (2011–present)
- Editor: Chris Lent
- Running time: 45–46 minutes
- Production company: Wall to Wall Media Ltd

Original release
- Network: National Geographic Channel
- Release: July 11, 2010 – September 4, 2019

Drugs, Inc. is an American documentary style television series on the National Geographic Channel that explores global narcotics production and trafficking. The series features drug dealers, recreational users, and addicts, as well as professionals in the fields of substance abuse, drug rehabilitation, and criminal justice. Interview subjects frequently have their voices changed or hide their faces behind masks or bandanas, in order to avoid public exposure or arrest by the local authorities.

Each episode of seasons 1 and 2 focused on a specific drug, while episodes in the following seasons investigated multiple drugs in each city or location.

A sister series, Underworld, Inc., focused on criminal activity of specific types and/or in individual cities.

== Episodes ==
=== Season 1 (2010) ===
No.	Title	Original release date
1	"Cocaine"	July 11, 2010
2	"Meth"	July 11, 2010
3	"Heroin"	July 12, 2010
4	"Marijuana"	July 12, 2010

=== Season 2 (2012) ===
No.	Title	Original release date
1	"Crack"	January 1, 2012
2	"Hash"	January 1, 2012
3	"Ecstasy"	January 8, 2012
4	"Hallucinogens DMT"	January 15, 2012
5	"Ketamine"	January 22, 2012
6	"Pill Nation"	January 29, 2012
7	"Designer Drugs"	February 12, 2012
8	"Grand Theft Auto"	February 19, 2012

=== Season 3 (2012) ===
No.	Title	Original air date
1	"High Stakes Vegas"	October 21, 2012
2	"Alaska Heroin Rush"	October 28, 2012
3	"Hawaiian Ice"	November 11, 2012
4	"Drug Kings of New York"	November 18, 2012
5	"Hurricane Blow"	November 25, 2012
6	"Meth Boom Montana"	December 9, 2012
7	"Hollywood High"	December 16, 2012
8	"Zombie Island"	December 23, 2012
9	"Motor City Rush"	December 30, 2012
10	"Coke Kings and Queens"	January 6, 2013

=== Season 4 (2013) ===
No.	Title	Original release date
1	"San Francisco Meth Zombies"	August 11, 2013
2	"Jamaican Gangs, Guns and Ganja"	August 18, 2013
3	"Windy City High"	August 25, 2013
4	"High in Houston"	September 1, 2013
5	"Rocky Mountain High"	September 15, 2013
6	"Miami Vices"	September 22, 2013
7	"Philly Dope"	September 29, 2013
8	"Wasted In Seattle"	October 6, 2013
9	"Cartel City, Arizona"	October 13, 2013
10	"Stashville, Tennessee"	October 20, 2013
11(S)	"The Drug Makers"	November 24, 2013
12(S)	"Going to Extremes"	November 24, 2013
13(S)	"Best in the Business"	November 24, 2013

=== Season 5 (2014) ===
No.	Title	Original release date
S	"Breakdown"	June 29, 2014
1	"Salt Lake Sinners"	July 2, 2014
2	"Cokeland"	July 9, 2014
3	"PCP in D.C."	July 16, 2014
4	"Dope-landia"	July 23, 2014
5	"Memphis Mayhem"	July 30, 2014
6	"Snitch Cities"	August 6, 2014
7	"Molly Madness"	August 13, 2014
8	"Dallas Dope Cowboys"	August 20, 2014
9	"The High Wire"	August 27, 2014
10	"Boston Benzo Buzz"	September 3, 2014
11(S)	"Dealer POV"	September 3, 2014

=== Season 6 (2014) ===
No.	Title	Original release date	U.S. Viewers
1(S)	"The Inside Man"	November 9, 2014	N/A
2(S)	"Bad Boys"	November 12, 2014	749,000
1	"Flesh-Eating Krokodil"	November 12, 2014	764,000
2	"Cocaine White Gold"	November 19, 2014	670,000
3	"Super Meth"	November 26, 2014	692,000
4	"Marijuana Mayhem"	December 3, 2014	820,000
5	"Manic Molly"	December 10, 2014	785,000
6	"New Year's Eve NYC"	December 17, 2014	677,000
7(S)	"Cartel Chaos"	January 3, 2015	643,000
8	"Hardcore Heroin"	January 7, 2015	743,000
9	"Mardi Gras"	January 14, 2015	676,000
10	"Spring Break"	January 21, 2015	928,000
11	"Sin-dependence Day"	January 28, 2015	704,000

=== Season 7 (2015-16) ===
No.	Title	Original release date
1	"The Real Wolves of Wall Street"	September 16, 2015
2	"Hip Hop High"	September 23, 2015
3	"X-Rated High"	September 30, 2015
4	"Cancun Spring Break"	October 7, 2015
5	"Jailhouse Junkies"	October 14, 2015
6	"Big Apple Coke"	October 21, 2015
7	"Detroit Halloween"	October 28, 2015
8	"Pittsburgh Smack"	November 4, 2015
9(S)	"The Living Dead"	November 4, 2015
10(S)	"Grim Reaper"	November 11, 2015
11	"Silicon Valley High"	November 11, 2015
12	"Heroin Island, NYC"	November 18, 2015
13(S)	"Holidaze"	November 18, 2015
14	"Euro Coke"	November 25, 2015
15(S)	"Business Behind Bars"	November 25, 2015
16	"Aussie Ice Wars"	December 2, 2015
17	"Tex Meth"	December 9, 2015
18	"Boston Weed Party"	December 16, 2015
19	"Bangkok Ice"	December 23, 2015
20	"Shooting Up Suburbia"	December 30, 2015
21(S)	"Chasing the High"	June 15, 2016
22(S)	"Cartel Games"	June 22, 2016
23(S)	"Working Girls"	July 17, 2016

=== Season 8 (2018) ===
No.	Title	Original release date
1	"Hard Hit Houston"	April 13, 2018

== See also ==
- War on drugs
- Prohibition of drugs
- Arguments for and against drug prohibition
