= Nicky Moffat =

British Army officer (born 1962)

Nicky Moffat CBE
- Born: 1962 (age 63–64)
- Branch: Women's Royal Army Corps
- Rank: Brigadier
- Awards: 100 Women (BBC)

Brigadier Nicola Patricia Moffat, CBE (born 1962) was the highest-ranking woman in the British Army from 2009 until her resignation in 2012. She is now a leadership consultant and speaker.

== Life ==
Moffat graduated in 1985 with a B.A. in Hispanic Studies from the University of Liverpool, though has said that she "almost got booted out" for neglecting her studies in favour of the Officers' Training Corps' activities. In 1995 she gained an MA in Military Studies, Defence from Cranfield University.

She joined the then Women's Royal Army Corps after university, and stayed in the army 26 years, including a spell as military private secretary to Geoff Hoon while he was Minister of Defence. Her final posting before resigning was as Armed Forces head of pay and strategic manning at the Ministry of Defence. She took voluntary redundancy in 2012, saying "After a long and rewarding career, I am looking forward to new challenges, utilizing the wealth of experience the military has afforded me." Her resignation caused some surprise, as six months earlier she had given an interview enthusing about the army as a career for women. She has founded the What Good Leadership Looks Like consultancy, and appears as a speaker on awards panels.

In 2018, Moffat appeared as a primary instructor in the BBC living history series Secret Agent Selection: WW2, later released on Netflix as Churchill's Secret Agents: The New Recruits. Alongside Lieutenant Colonel Adrian Weale and military psychologist Mike Rennie, Moffat was tasked with reviving and recreating the training process of the Special Operations Executive and determining whether fourteen candidates had what it took to survive as a secret agent in Nazi-occupied Europe.

== Recognition ==
Moffat was appointed CBE in the 2012 New Year Honours, cited as "Late Adjutant General's Corps (Staff and Personnel Support Branch)".

She was selected as one of the BBC's 100 Women in 2014, cited as "Highest Ranked woman in British Armed Forces".
