= Colonial House (TV series) =

2004 British documentary TV series

- Also known as: Pioneer House
- Genre: Reality
- Directed by: Kristi Jacobson, Sally Aitken
- Country of origin: United Kingdom
- Original language: English
- No. of seasons: 1
- No. of episodes: 8

Production
- Executive producer: Sallie Clement
- Producers: Kristi Jacobson, Philippa Ross, Sally Aitken
- Cinematography: Will Edwards
- Editors: Stephen Day, Martyn Hone, Annette Williams
- Camera setup: Single-camera
- Running time: 48 minutes
- Production company: Wall to Wall Media

Original release
- Network: Channel 4 PBS (United States)
- Release: May 17 – May 25, 2004

The Pioneer House (named Colonial House in the United States) is an British reality series produced by Thirteen/WNET New York and Wall to Wall Television in the United Kingdom, following the success of The 1900 House, an exercise in vicarious "experiential history" that is characteristic of an attempt to provide an educational version of popular reality television. It aired on PBS in the United States and on Channel 4 in the United Kingdom in 2004.

== Overview ==
The series, intended to recreate daily life in Plymouth Colony in 1628 along the lines of the recreated Plimoth Plantation, brought home to viewers the rigors of life for colonists in the early 17th century. The show was videotaped in a 1,000-acre (4.0 km^{2}) isolated area near Machias, Maine, and featured colonists and several members of the current Passamaquoddy tribe of Maine. Historians from Plimoth Plantation and Maine historian and archaeologist Emerson Baker of Salem State College helped to make the setting as accurate as possible.

Seventeen applicants were chosen out of thousands to join the project. Most of the participants were American, though there were some British citizens as well. The project began in spring and was set to run for five months.

== Colonists ==
Original colony:

- Jeff Wyers - Governor (in 21st century life, a Baptist minister). From Waco, TX
- Tammy Wyers - Governor's Wife
- Bethany Wyers - Governor's Daughter
- Amy Wyers - Governor's Daughter
- David Wyers - Governor's Son (age 9)
- Don Heinz - Lay Preacher / Acting Governor / Governor (in 21st century life, Professor of Religious Studies at California State University in Chico), age 63
- Carolyn Heinz - Preacher's Wife (in 21st century life, Professor of Anthropology)
- Paul Hunt - Governor's Servant. Age 26, from Manchester, England. Indentured Servant.
- Julia Friese - Governor's Servant (in 21st century life, a museum guide)
- Jonathon Allen - Heinz family servant (in 21st century life, a student)
- Danny Tisdale - Freeman (in 21st century life, a publisher and teacher) age 44. Living in Harlem, N.Y.C.
- Michelle Rossi-Voorhees - Freeman's Wife (from Beverly, Massachusetts)
- John Voorhees - Freeman (in 21st century life, a carpet salesman)
- Giacomo Voorhees - Freeman's Son
- Don Wood - Freeman (in 21st century life, a carpenter from New York)
- Amy Kristina-Herbert - Single Woman
- Dominic Muir - Freeman (from Britain)
- Henry the dog (white dog)
- Chloe the dog (brown dog)

Additional colonists:

- Jeff Lin - Company Servant
- Dave Verdecia - Freeman (in 21st century life, a firefighter-engineer and paramedic)
- Debbie Verdecia - Freeman's Wife
- Maddie Verdecia(15) - Freeman's Daughter
- Tony Verdecia(13) - Freeman's Son
- Emily Verdecia(9) - Freeman’s daughter
- Craig Tuminaro - Company Servant as identified in Episode 7
- Clare Samuels - Governor's Servant
- Jack Lecza - Cape Merchant

== Non-colonial participants ==
- John Bear Mitchell - A representative of the Passamaquoddy First Nations People
- George Sabattis - Passamaquoddy representative and trader
- Donald Soctomah - Passamaquoddy representative and trader
- Stuart Turner - Mashpee Wampanoag
- Alice Lopez - Mashpee Wampanoag
- Jonathan Perry - Mashpee Wampanoag
- Nancy Endredge - Wampanoag Prog., Plimoth Plantation
- Randy Joseph - Wampanoag Prog., Plimoth Plantation
- John Peters Jr. - Mashpee Wampanoag
- Ramona Peters - Mashpee Wampanoag

== Provisions ==
The colonists were provided with four houses of varying sizes and comfort level, as well as chickens, goats and casks of dried provisions such as ship's biscuit, 500 lbs of salted fish, and 1000 lbs of salted pork. For main staples they were given a ton of wheat and half a ton each of oats and dried peas. Drink was also communal and rationed: 1 firkin of wine, 1 firkin of aqua vitae, and 1 barrel of beer. In the first episode, the colonists trade with the Passamaquoddy people to secure a supply of maize (indian corn) to be planted in the large field near the settlement. The corn was planted on mounds instead of rows, in keeping with the First Nations traditional method.

== Social hierarchy ==
In keeping with the social order of the 17th century, the Governor of the colony was appointed by the Colony to have full authority over the other colonists. The Freemen were property-holding men who were asked to give counsel in meetings. Women, indentured servants and children were neither allowed at the meetings nor given any political power. In Colonial House, though, the women were unsatisfied with losing all of their modern rights and spied on the Freemen's meetings and started to hold women's meetings themselves. After the Wyers family leave in Episode 2, the women begin to bargain for a more fair split of labor, which is resisted by the Freemen and the Acting Governor.

Although mandated by law to attend Christian church services on Sunday, the participants in the project are of varied beliefs, which causes some tension. The Wyers family is strongly Christian while Michelle Voorhees steadfastly refuses to "say the words" of the Christian prayers.

== Events ==
Episode One

- (Ep. 1) Near the beginning of the series, Danny Tisdale explains that simply going through the process of application for the show has changed the way he understands his own identity as an American of African descent, knowing that his grandmother Tulip Tisdale was a slave in the Americas.
- (Ep. 1) John Voorhees explains one of his motivations for joining the project was to meet a variety of people from different backgrounds and gain a sense of community, something he felt was missing from his work life.
- (Ep. 1) On the second day, the colonists get their first glimpse of natives around the settlement. John Voorhees says that his heritage is Paiute and that he feels uncomfortable with the tension between the colonists and the natives. Nine-year-old David Wyers is unsure whether they are "real Indians, like real, like colonial times. It's not like they live right now, how they always lived." Tammy Wyers explains to her son that the native people are "Still dangerous. Don't you watch the 10 o'clock news?"

Episode Two

- (Ep. 2) During the first Sabbath service, Julia Friese is overcome with emotion while hearing Bethany talk about her faith, and is inspired to "strive to be something better".
- (Ep. 2) The Passamaquoddy traders return with a gift of a dead muskrat, which they help the colonists prepare for dinner—this is the colony's first fresh meat.
- (Ep. 2) The Wyers family receives shocking news from home: Bethany's fiancé was killed, and the eldest Wyers son seriously injured, in a car accident. They depart the colony immediately, but father Jeff returns after ten days, at the beginning of Episode 3.
- (Ep. 2) The colonists hold a community dance and bonfire to raise morale since the loss of their leader.

Episode Three

- (Ep. 3) The Voorhees family (possibly led by Michelle) decide not to go to the Sabbath meeting, due to a conflict with their beliefs, breaking one of the major rules of the time period. Governor Wyers is particularly disturbed by this choice, worried that the "anarchy" will spread to other families. The Governor administers punishment to those who broke rules, and Michelle Voorhees is hobbled by her ankles and left tied to a stake outdoors for a few hours.
- (Ep. 3) After the Voorhees' transgression, and with Paul and Amy Kristina punished for profanity and the bachelor Freemen also declining to attend Sabbath worship, Governor Wyers comes to the reluctant conclusion that punishment for not attending Sabbath is "unenforcable" and are damaging the workforce. Without consulting his counselors, the laws respecting attendance of the Sabbath are then suspended. Lay Preacher Don Heinz is displeased with this decision, feeling the integrity of the project has been compromised.
- (Ep. 3) The Wyers family return after a five-week absence, with eight new colonists.

Episode Four

- (Ep. 4) The colony has expanded from 13 to 24 residents. Dominic expresses that the new influx of people and noise has caused him some anxiety and he "keeps having to run away and hide".
- (Ep. 4) Dominic leaves a note and disappears for two days "to explore". Don Wood understands that Dominic "needs a lot of alone time". Dominic wanders outside the 1000-acre boundaries of the project and into modern roads and town. Although he has broken a major rule, he apologizes to the community for causing them worry and faces no punishment.
- (Ep. 4) Jonathon Allen comes out as gay to his masters, Don and Carolyn Heinz, after feeling depressed and outcast for much of the project. He later comes out publicly at Sabbath and feels greatly relieved. However, Jeff Wyers takes a dark view of the news and is clearly displeased. He says "Jonathon came out in a church setting. It seemed like a somewhat strange time and place. Some people applauded... I didn't applaud. All men have sin... one step toward God... is seeking help. We must learn to master ourselves. Not pat each other on the back." However, Governor Wyers chooses not to punish Jonathon, although the Puritan punishment for homosexuality was death.
- (Ep. 4) Amy Kristina-Herbert leaves the project early, as planned, reflecting the historical event that many colonists gave up colonial life to return to their homes in Europe. She explains that part of the reason she "wanted to do this project, as a Black American, is that this is the beginning of the country I live in. My roots do not come from Puritanism, but this is the beginning of America and I am American. People need to stop thinking of just white people when they think of America. They need to ... see faces that aren't white. Me, a black girl, braids my hair in a Pilgrim outfit. ... It's no more ridiculous than trying to classify who's more American than them."
- The salted meat is discovered to be moldy, at a time when rations are running low and the four one-room houses are overcrowded.
- Governor Wyers suspends production and instructs the men to build a house for the Verdecia family of five.

Episode Five

- David Wyers celebrates his 10th birthday during the project.
- The salted fish is discovered to be rancid. The colony now has very little meat. A hunting party is sent into the forest but again return unsuccessful. The Governor instructs the servants in killing and butchering one of the sheep.
- With only ten men in the workforce, labor is slow. Danny Tisdale feels increasingly uncomfortable in the colony, recognizing that "There is a need for cheap labor... this idea of indentured servitude leads directly to slavery". He decides to leave the project, saying goodbye only to the Governor and his wife. His departure is deeply mourned by Governor Wyers.
- Members of the Passamaquoddy tribe return with furs to trade, but Governor Wyers is unable to come to an agreement with them.
- The Wyers family receives news that their elder daughter Amy is facing hospitalization at home and decide to leave at once. Don Heinz is appointed Governor.
- Carolyn, Michelle and the other women start holding meetings in which they plan political influence over their husbands in order to secure rights for the women. This echoes the story of Anne Hutchinson in the Massachusetts Bay Colony.

Episode Six

- Members of the Wampanoag people approach the colony but stay out of sight.
- The corn is harvested.
- The servants are asked to cut firewood, but Jonathon is asked to make maps of the colony and Dominic sketches the Governor's portrait.
- Governor Heinz suggests starting a school, choosing Jonathon and Dominic to learn ancient Greek. He points out that Harvard College would be founded just 8 years later. Many of the lower-ranking colonists display irritation at this show of favoritism.

Episode Seven

- Members of the Wampanoag people make contact with the colony. They joined the project to experience how their ancestors lived in 1628 and express a "gut feeling of discomfort" at seeing the colonists' houses for the first time.
- Ramona Peters speaks to the gathered colonists and explains that in 17th-century America "Everyone had the freedom to practice religion except the Native Americans". The Wampanoag people make a pact among themselves not to accept any food from the settlers, but one person breaks the agreement, sparking a reaction from Nancy Eldredge: "We just don't want it to appear like 'happy Indians with the first Thanksgiving, Colonial' because it wasn't that way at all. ... If we were being treated in a good way even today and our land wasn't still being taken ... then it would be fine."
- The colonists had made an agreement with the Passamaquoddy not to trade with any other people and choose to pass up the valuable trading opportunity with the Wampanoag.

Episode Eight

- The colonists are evaluated by a team of historians.

== Criticism ==
Please see IMDB criticisms for Colonial House. The main criticism is that a large number of the reenactors did not attempt to reenact—instead they tried to subvert this attempt at reenactment.

== New Zealand version ==
A New Zealand version of the series was produced by TVNZ. The series features the Huttons from South Otago, a 21st-century family chosen to 'time travel' back to 1852 to live in a colonial house.

== See also ==
- Frontier House
- Texas Ranch House
- BBC historic farm series
