= Narcoworld: Dope Stories =

2019 documentary television miniseries

- Genre: Documentary; Crime
- Country of origin: United States
- Original languages: English; Spanish; French; Portuguese
- No. of seasons: 1
- No. of episodes: 4

Production
- Running time: 39–48 minutes
- Production company: Wall to Wall Media

Original release
- Network: Netflix
- Release: November 22, 2019

Narcoworld: Dope Stories is a 2019 documentary television series. The premise revolves around global drug trade, told from both the drug trade and law enforcement side.

== Cast ==
- Michael Beach as Narrator

== Release ==
Narcoworld: Dope Stories was released on November 22, 2019, on Netflix.
