= Plotlands =

1997 British period drama TV series

- Genre: Period drama
- Created by: Jeremy Brock
- Directed by: John Strickland
- Starring: David Ryall; Philip Whitchurch; Richard Lintern; Rebecca Callard; Amanda Abbington; Jade Williams; Saskia Reeves; Richard Cordery; Jamie Glover; Petra Markham; Eve Schickle; Terence Beesley; Richard Amery
- Composer: John E. Keane
- Country of origin: United Kingdom
- Original language: English
- No. of series: 1
- No. of episodes: 6

Production
- Executive producers: Alex Graham; Matthew Hamilton; Jane Root; Tessa Ross
- Producer: Louis Marks
- Production locations: Ashridge, Little Gaddesden, Wivenhoe, Hertfordshire, England, UK
- Cinematography: David Odd
- Editor: Jerry Leon
- Running time: 51 minutes
- Production company: Wall to Wall

Original release
- Network: BBC1
- Release: 18 May – 22 June 1997

Plotlands is a British period drama series was written and created by Jeremy Brock and that aired on BBC1 from 18 May to 22 June 1997. Produced by Wall to Wall for the BBC, it tells the story of several families who live in the fictional town of Plotlands. The series was filmed on location in and around Ashridge country house in Hertfordshire and Wivenhoe, Essex.

== Cast ==
- David Ryall as Harry Crowley
- Philip Whitchurch as Billy Reed
- Richard Lintern as Tom Marsh
- Rebecca Callard as Harriet Marsh
- Amanda Abbington as Maude
- Jade Williams as Joan Marsh
- Saskia Reeves as Chloe Marsh
- Richard Cordery as Charles Foster
- Jamie Glover as Ralph Samson
- Petra Markham as Grace Foster
- Eve Schickle as Beattie Crowley
- Terence Beesley as Jon Marsh
- Richard Amery as Charlie

== Episodes ==
No.	Title	Directed by	Written by	Airdate
1	"Chloe"	John Strickland	Jeremy Brock	18 May 1997
Chloe Marsh, a Londoner sees an advert for a plot of land for £5 in Langton Fields, she decides to go taking with her her two daughters, to escape from her violent husband. She soon discovers that the land agent, Harry Crowley hasn't told the whole truth, the land is very isolated and the water contaminated. She takes some work picking potatoes, but makes the mistake of eating them raw, she gets dreadful stomach pains, but her daughters find that their new neighbours will help them.
2	"Rory"	John Strickland	Jeremy Brock	25 May 1997
Harry offers Chloe domestic work in his house but then he makes a pass at her which she feels compromises her position there. Rory and his son sign up for barge work at the local docks, with the hope that soon they'll be able to build their dream home. Rory's temper gets the better of him and he loses the job, his wife Grainne is devasted as she saw Langton Field as their last hope.
3	"Tom"	John Strickland	Jeremy Brock	1 June 1997
The residents hear of a criminal on the run who is heading for Langton Field. He turns out to be George, an old Army comrade of Tom's. He turns violent when Tom asks him to leave. Chloe sees this and agrees to help George escape as the police close in. Later, Tom tells Chloe the hold George has over him -the incident that happened during the war. Meanwhile there is a growing sense of community in Langton Field, The Mulligans lay the foundations of their house, and Charles Forster sets up a small school.
4	"Orphans of the Storm"	John Strickland	Jeremy Brock	8 June 1997
Chloe and Harriet have a row and Chloe ends up telling Tom why she left London. Ralph has made an impression on Maude though she doesn't understand a lot of what he says. A storm brews and in the storm Harriet goes missing but Maude finds her.
5	"The Party"	John Strickland	Jeremy Brock	15 June 1997
Harry decides to throw a party to celebrate the first anniversary of selling a plot of land at Langton Hill. Tom erects a marquee and Harry puts Chloe in charge of the refreshments so that Tom and Chloe are working closely together. It appears that Harry wants to impress two guests- The Spencers- that he has brought along with him, Billy's suspicions about the party are confirmed when he overhears a conversation about the sale of the field. The Spencers' chauffeur takes advantage of Grace and she has an argument with her husband which leaves her devastated.
6	"Homes for Heroes"	John Strickland	Jeremy Brock	22 June 1997
Chloe and Tom are in love, but Chloe is horrified when her violent husband John turns up after someone has recognised her and told him of her whereabouts. He decides he is going to stay and settle as a plot lander with his wife and daughters, but he has not changed his ways. However, Chloe and Harriet are not prepared to go back to such a way of living and take drastic action. The plot landers join together to build the Mulligans a new house hoping that it will help change the mind of landlord Harry Crowley, who they learn is thinking of selling up and evicting them all.

== Awards ==
Les Lansdown won the Royal Television Society Craft & Design Award for Best Costume Design Drama in 1997.
