= Churchill's Secret Agents: The New Recruits =

- Genre: Reality
- Narrated by: Douglas Henshall
- Countries of origin: United Kingdom; United States
- Original language: English
- No. of seasons: 1
- No. of episodes: 5

Production
- Executive producers: Dan Gold; Cate Hall
- Camera setup: Multi-camera set-up
- Running time: 45-48 minutes
- Production company: Wall to Wall Media

Original release
- Network: BBC; Netflix
- Release: 9 April – 8 May 2018

Churchill's Secret Agents: The New Recruits, originally released as Secret Agent Selection: WW2 in the UK, is a BBC television programme produced by Wall to Wall in association with Netflix. The five-part series was originally broadcast from Monday 29 June to Tuesday 8 May 2018.

== Premise ==
This "living history" series reconstructs the training programme of one of the Second World War's most covert organizations. Fourteen modern day recruits undertake the same rigorous physical and psychological assessments as the 1940s candidates for the Special Operations Executive. The programme follows their progress to determine if they have what it takes to be an agent of SOE and fight the Nazis in occupied Europe.

The SOE was a civilian part of wartime British intelligence, responsible for sabotage and espionage. The organization recruited ordinary citizens from all backgrounds and walks of life, and put them through gruelling training to extract the traits necessary to be an SOE agent deep in enemy territory.

Filming occurred in Scotland on the Alvie and Dalraddy Estates in the Cairngorms area, and Forglen House and estate in Aberdeenshire.

== Cast ==
The Trainers:

- Lieutenant Colonel Adrian Weale, commanding officer
- Brigadier Nicky Moffat, instructor
- Mike Rennie, military psychologist
- Rod Bailey, SOE historian

The Recruits:

- Samy Ali, ex-armed forces, eliminated during training
- Rohini Bajaj, doctor, eliminated during training
- Roger Barris, retired investment banker, voluntarily resigned during training
- Charlotte Beauclerk, interpreter, eliminated during evaluation
- Will Beresford-Davies, paralegal, successfully completed the course
- Ceebe Cae (credited as Maria Ceebe Camara), council administrator, eliminated during evaluation
- Debbey Clitheroe, drama teacher, grandma, successfully completed the course
- Rob Copsey, ex-paratrooper, successfully completed the course
- Dan Dewhirst, corporate developer, eliminated during training
- Lizzie Jeffreys, research scientist, successfully completed the course
- Alastair Stanley, maths graduate, successfully completed the course
- Paul Stone, entertainer, eliminated during evaluation
- Magda Thomas, interpreter, successfully completed the course
- Vicki Wright, former police officer, eliminated during evaluation

== Selection ==
In the first episode of the series, the 14 prospective recruits were put through an initial four-day selection process, to determine which candidates would proceed to training. As per the 1940s, the recruits were graded according to a colour code scheme, which was displayed on a blackboard using poker chips. The board made only fleeting appearances on screen and in the later stages looked like this:

=== Poker Chips ===
Recruits	Observational	Mechanical	Morse	Obstacle	Verbal	Blocks	Matrices	Psychology	Groupstacle	Pond Test
Ali				?						
Bajaj				?						
Barris				?						
Beauclerk				?						
Beresford-Davies										
Camara										
Clitheroe										
Copsey										
Dewhirst										
Jeffreys										
Stanley										
Stone										
Thomas										
Wright										

The Recruit had an Outstanding performance in this portion of the test.
The Recruit had a Good performance in this portion of the test.
The Recruit had an Above Average performance in this portion of the test.
The Recruit had a Below Average performance in this portion of the test.
The Recruit had a Low performance in this portion of the test, but passed.
The Recruit Failed this portion of the test.
The trainers did not put a chip on the board.

== Episodes ==
No.	Title	Original release date	U.S. release date
1	"Selection"	April 9, 2018	June 29, 2018
The series opens by charting the beginnings of SOE. The students face the Student Assessment Board - an intense 4-day course to discover who has the raw talent to progress to the full training. DAY 1: Observational Skills Test - The first test the recruits were given was to test their observational skills. They were all given a layout of a building and had 20 minutes to memorize the entire layout. However, during their memorization two soldiers ran through chasing each other firing at each other. The recruits were then quizzed on the stunt. Most recruits were unprepared for the dramatics and did a poor a job on observing the situation. Notably, Paul Stone hid under his desk.; Mechanical Aptitude - Next the recruits were given a Meccano set and three different models of varying difficulty to build (a chair, a bridge, and an airplane). Alastair Stanley was the only recruit to complete the airplane model (the most difficult of the three). Ceebe Camara had the poorest performance, moving noticeably slower than the other recruits, to complete even the simplest model.; Morse Code Aptitude - The last test of Day 1 had the recruits listening to a song with a hidden message in morse code.; DAY 2: Obstacle Course - On Day 2, the Recruits were put through a rigorous obstacle course with points awarded for every obstacle completed. Recruits must score a total of 50 points out of a possible 90 to pass the course. The toughest obstacle by far was the final 10 Foot Wall that recruits had to climb. Notably, Lizzie Jeffreys (the shortest Recruit) and Rob Copsey (an amputee) were among the few able to scale the wall. Charlotte Beauclerk and Ceebe Camara had the worst performances on the course. Camara moved slowly due to a fear of heights at multiple points throughout the course and Beauclerk skipped the barbed wire crawl because she didn't want her hair to get caught.; Rope Climb - Following the obstacle course, Recruits were taken to another obstacle where they were forced to take a vertical climb up and then across two ropes from one tree to another. There was an option given to cross at two different heights a lower height at 30 feet, and the higher level at 60 feet. Lizzie Jeffreys went first and chose the higher ropes. Ceebe Camara also chose the higher level, conquering her fear of heights to the surprise of Nicky Moffat. Paul Stone sat out of this test due to severe migraines.; DAY 3: The Pond Test - On Day 3, The Recruits were split into 2 Teams to tackle The Pond Test. With meager supplies the teams must construct a raft to carry them across the pond to retrieve a radio. The first team to attempt the test was Team A, composed of Samy Ali, Rohini Bajaj, Will Beresford-Davies, Debbey Clitheroe, Dan Dewhirst, Lizzie Jeffreys, and Paul Stone. Dewhirst was selected by the trainers as the leader of the group. The team approached the test with organization and Dewhirst was a hands on, clear leader. However, the team's raft fell apart feet short of the radio soaking the team in the pond. Team B, composed of Roger Barris, Charlotte Beauclerk, Ceebe Camara, Rob Copsey, Alastair Stanley, Magda Thomas, and Vicki Wright. Team B, prior to attempting the test chose Copsey as their leader, however, when it came time for the test the trainers chose Wright. This led to the team talking over each other and struggling to complete a raft. Team B was saved when Alastair Stanley scouted out the surrounding area and found a premade raft hidden further down the pond, allowing them to complete the test in 22 minutes.; DAY 4: Buddy Rating - After completing the Student Assessment Board, the Recruits were given one last test. Each recruit was to answer a simple survey answering three questions: Which two recruits would you choose to be on a team with you? Which recruit would you choose as your leader? Which recruit would you leave behind? Copsey and Dewhirst were most picked as leaders, while Camara and Stone were picked the most to get left behind.; After deliberation, the training officers decided which four recruits would not move forward to training. The eliminated recruits were Charlotte Beauclerk, Maria Ceebe Camara, Paul Stone, and Vicki Wright. The remaining Recruits were loaded into a truck and taken to their first day of training. Note: Some or all of the recruits also took part in a Verbal Skills test, a Kohs block design test, Raven's Progressive Matrices, a Psychological evaluation, and a "Groupstacle" test. However, these tests were aired only briefly or not at all during the episode.
2	"Training"	April 16, 2018	June 29, 2018
The students training begins as they learn how to use guns, explosives and silent killing techniques. We learn how these skills all came together and helped SOE pull off one of the most audacious assassinations of WWII.
3	"Survival"	April 23, 2018	June 29, 2018
The students go to the remote Scottish Highlands where they learn the survival skills required for life in the field. They are schooled in some of the same techniques which prepared a group of agents to halt Hitler's atomic ambitions.
4	"Finishing School"	April 30, 2018	June 29, 2018
The students attend the SOE "finishing school" where they will learn the skills needed to operate undercover inside enemy territory such as lock-picking and sending coded messages. They then face a mock interrogation.
5	"The Final Scheme"	May 8, 2018	June 29, 2018
As the immersive history series draws to a close, eight of the original students have fallen by the wayside. The six remaining recruits undertake a 24 hour practice realistic mission that will test all the skills they have learned.
