= Becoming You =

Documentary television series on Apple TV+

- Promotional poster
- Genre: Documentary
- Directed by: Tom Barbor-Might; Ben Addelman; Tom Dumican; James Morgan; Ronnie Krensel
- Narrated by: Olivia Colman
- Country of origin: United States
- Original language: English
- No. of episodes: 6

Production
- Executive producers: Hamo Forsyth; Tim Lambert; Leanne Klein
- Running time: 39-43 minutes
- Production company: Wall to Wall Media

Original release
- Network: Apple TV+
- Release: November 13, 2020

Becoming You is a documentary television series created by Wall to Wall Media and narrated by Olivia Colman. The series was released on November 13, 2020 on Apple TV+.

== Premise ==
Becoming You follows 100 children from across the world through their first 2,000 days on Earth.

== Episodes ==
No.	Title	Directed by	Original release date
1	"Who Am I?"	Ben Addelman & Tom Dumican & James Morgan & Ronnie Krensel	November 13, 2020
2	"Moving"	Ben Addelman & Tom Dumican & James Morgan & Ronnie Krensel	November 13, 2020
3	"Making Friends"	Ben Addelman & Tom Dumican & James Morgan & Ronnie Krensel	November 13, 2020
4	"Feeling"	Ben Addelman & Tom Dumican & Tom Barbor-Might & Ronnie Krensel	November 13, 2020
5	"Talking"	Ben Addelman & Tom Dumican & Tom Barbor-Might & Ronnie Krensel	November 13, 2020
6	"Thinking"	Ben Addelman & Tom Dumican & James Morgan & Ronnie Krensel	November 13, 2020

== Release ==
Becoming You was announced on August 26, 2020, along with the rest of the late-2020 docuseries lineup being released by Apple TV+, including Long Way Up, Tiny World, and Earth at Night in Color. The six-episode series was released on November 13, 2020.
