= Emerson Baker =

American historian (born 1958)

- Born: Emerson Baker II; May 18, 1958 (age 68); Fitchburg, Massachusetts
- Other name: Tad
- Education: Phillips Academy; Bates College (BA); University of Maine (MA); College of William & Mary (PhD)
- Occupation: Professor
- Years active: 1988–present
- Employer: Salem State University

Emerson "Tad" Baker II (born 18 May 1958) is a historical archaeologist and professor of history at Salem State University. He is well known in academic circles for his extensive work on witchcraft in Colonial America, as well as for his work on numerous archaeological sites along the East Coast of the United States. He currently resides in York, Maine.

== Early life and education ==
Baker was born in Fitchburg, Massachusetts in 1958 and attended Applewild School and Phillips Academy. Before attending Bates College in Lewiston, Maine (where he would later meet his wife and play/lead the rugby club), Baker spent a year in the United Kingdom studying at Cranleigh School, where he learned to play rugby. After graduating from Bates with a BA in history in 1980, he received his MA in history (with a concentration in historical archaeology) from the University of Maine at Orono in 1983. In 1986, he received his Ph.D. in history (with a dissertation on failed Anglo-Indian relations in early Maine) from the College of William & Mary under the guidance of James Axtell.

== Career ==
From 1988 to 1994, Baker served as executive director of the York Institute Museum and Dyer Library. He joined the faculty of Salem State University in September 1994.

A specialist in the history of seventeenth century Maine, Baker has been featured as an expert consultant on the PBS mini-series Colonial House; he has also provided historical consultation for Parks Canada, National Geographic, Plimoth Plantation, National Park Service, Historic Salem Inc., Beverly Historical Society and many historic district commissions." He has also served as an expert witness for archaeological matters in several court cases in Nova Scotia and Maine.

== Works ==
- The Clarke & Lake Company: The Historical Archaeology of a Seventeenth-Century Maine Settlement ASIN B001U7I9A0 (1985)
- American Beginnings: Exploration, Culture and Cartography in the Land of Norumbega ISBN 0-8032-4554-8 (1995)
- The New England Knight: Sir William Phips, 1651-1695 ISBN 0-8020-8171-1 (1998)
- The Devil of Great Island: Witchcraft and Conflict in Early New England ISBN 1-4039-7207-9 (2007)
- A Storm of Witchcraft: The Salem Trials and the American Experience. Oxford University Press ISBN 978-0199890347 (2014)
