= Child Genius (British TV series) =

2013 British reality TV series

- Genre: Competition
- Presented by: Richard Osman
- Starring: Olivia van der Werff; Simon Blair
- Narrated by: Celia Imrie
- Country of origin: United Kingdom
- Original language: English
- No. of seasons: 6
- No. of episodes: 29 (Regular); 3 (Celebrities)

Production
- Production company: Wall to Wall Media

Original release
- Network: Channel 4
- Release: 11 June 2013 – present

Related
- Child Genius (US)

Child Genius is a British reality competition series produced by Wall to Wall Media, broadcast on Channel 4. There have been six series, one broadcast each year since 2013, except 2018.

== Description ==
The show involves a group of child prodigies competing a series of tasks to gain the title of child genius. Simon Blair acted as quizmaster for the first three series and since 2016, the role has been taken by Richard Osman, who also acts as presenter. Alongside the quizmaster, Olivia van der Werff acts as independent adjudicator and they are joined by an expert in the round's subject.

=== Celebrity editions ===
In October 2016, a celebrity edition aired on Channel 4 as part of Stand Up to Cancer UK. Celebrities who took part were Aisling Bea, Alan Carr, Rachel Riley and Krishnan Guru-Murthy.

In December 2017, another celebrity edition was aired as a Christmas Special. The celebrities who took part were Janet Street-Porter, Dom Joly, Cathy Newman and Rob Delaney.

Despite the absence of the series in 2018, an annual Christmas celebrity edition was aired in December. Celebrities who took part were Shazia Mirza, Rick Edwards, Charlotte Hawkins and Jimmy Carr.

On Christmas Eve, 2019, another Christmas Celebrity Edition was aired. Jimmy Carr was once again Team Captain, alongside Richard Bacon, Vick Hope and Jo Brand.
