= The Battle That Made Britain =

- Genre: Documentary
- Country of origin: United Kingdom
- Original language: English

Production
- Producer: Lucy McDowell
- Running time: 60 minutes

Original release
- Network: BBC Four
- Release: 13 June 2006

The Battle That Made Britain is a 2006 BBC Television documentary telling the Battle of Culloden.
