= Berlin ER =

German medical drama TV series

- German: KRANK Berlin
- Genre: Medical drama; Procedural drama
- Created by: Samuel Jefferson; Viktor Jakovleski
- Directed by: Alex Schaad; Fabian Möhrke
- Starring: Haley Louise Jones; Slavko Popadić; Şafak Şengül; Aram Tafreshian; Samirah Breuer; Bernhard Schütz; Peter Lohmeyer; Benjamin Radjaipour
- Country of origin: Germany
- Original language: German
- No. of seasons: 1
- No. of episodes: 8

Production
- Executive producers: Alexis von Wittgenstein; Henning Kamm
- Running time: 46-49 minutes

Original release
- Network: Apple TV+
- Release: 26 February – 9 April 2025
- Network: Apple TV

Berlin ER (original title: KRANK Berlin) is a German medical drama television series created by Samuel Jefferson and Viktor Jakovleski for Apple TV+ and ZDF. Produced by Alexis von Wittgenstein and Henning Kamm, the themes of Berlin ER were inspired by Jefferson's past experience working as a doctor in a London emergency room. The series follows emergency department staff at a fictional Neukölln hospital in Berlin as they face medical, interpersonal, and systematic issues. The first series began airing on February 26, 2025, and went on to win "Best Drama Series" at the 2025 German Television Awards. A second series is expected in 2026.

== Overview ==
Dr. Suzanna "Zanna" Parker (Jones) begins her new job as head of the ER at a Berlin hospital after a personal issue drives her geriatrics job in Munich. She must lead an underfunded ER team, balancing the needs of her resistant staff and the management's drive for revenue, along with her own morals. Among the other doctors are Ben Weber (Popadić), a kind albeit rule-bending doctor who is privately struggling with opiod addiction and leans on his clubbing partner and fellow doctor Kian Amini (Radjaipour); Emina Ertan (Şengül), a wry yet exceedingly competent Turkish-German doctor, and Dominik Kohn (Tafreshian), an undertrained internal medicine resident who hides his mistakes. Patients are brought into the hospital by cynical EMT Olaf Hendel (Schütz) and his trainee Olivia Kropf (Breuer).

== Cast ==
- Haley Louise Jones as Dr. Suzanna "Zanna" Parker, the hospital's new ER boss in an overwhelmed and underfunded department
- Slavko Popadić as Dr. Ben Weber, a charitable doctor who makes an effort to help those who have fallen through the cracks despite his own personal struggles
- Şafak Şengül as Dr. Emina Ertan, a talented and dry doctor with a soft spot for Olivia
- Aram Tafreshian as Dr. Dominik "Dom" Kohn, a charming but incompetent doctor who struggles to cover his errors
- Samirah Breuer as Olivia Kropf, a young EMT trainee with fresh enthusiasm to help others
- Bernhard Schütz as Olaf Hendel, a seasoned EMT who harbors disdain for the young drug-takers that comprise a large portion of the Neukölln EMT's callers
- Peter Lohmeyer as Dr. Steffen Beck, the head of the hospital who wishes that the emergency department would be eliminated due to its unprofitability
- Benjamin Radjaipour as Dr. Kian Amini, Ben's clubbing partner who looks out for his health

== Episodes ==
No.	Title	Directed by	Written by	Original release date
1	"Symptoms" (German: Symptome)	Fabian Möhrke	Samuel Jefferson and Lisa van Brakel	February 26, 2025
Dr. Ben Weber stumbles into his place of work, a Berlin hospital, still hazy from a night of clubbing and drugs, and runs into the new head of the emergency department, Dr. Zanna Parker. While another member of the hospital staff, Dr. Kian Amini, gives Ben a concoction of fluids to get him back on his feet, Dr. Steffan Beck, head of the hospital, meets with Zanna and explains the high turnover of the position. Due to the frequency with which new faces cycle through this position, the ER staff give Zanna a less than warm welcome, erasing her name on the whiteboard chart and writing insults instead. Throughout the shift, Ben slips into the locker room to take tilidine, and later steals more from the ER's drug cabinet. After some conflict while with the staff while working on patients caught in a gun fight, Zanna carves her name into the patient chalkboard, signaling her intent to stay despite the position's difficulties.
2	"Investigations" (German: Ermittlungen)	Fabian Möhrke	Lisa van Brakel, Paulina Lorenz, and Samuel Jefferson	February 26, 2025
Zanna meets with Dr. Beck again, and he tells her that due to pressure from the government, she must find a scapegoat to fire for a death that occurred in the hospital's May Day chaos earlier that year. Meanwhile, Emina is visited by her teenage brother Afrim, who asks her to come to his birthday party despite her poor relationship with their parents. She refuses, and her mood worsens when she must bail on a promising job interview in order to conduct an emergency endoscopy. While trying to determine culpability for the May Day incident, Zanna hits a dead end due to the staff's unwillingness to pinpoint it on one person. Understanding, Dr. Beck tells Zanna that he will pass along that she successfully investigated the incident.
3	"Diagnosis" (German: Diagnose)	Fabian Möhrke	Lisa van Brakel, Korbinian Hamberger, and Samuel Jefferson	March 5, 2025
While bringing breakfast and clean needles to Viktoria, a homeless woman he knows near the hospital, Ben misses a department meeting where Zanna explains the changes she is enacting. She tells the staff they must start triaging all patients upon arrival, and that the department drug cabinet will be kept locked due to the frequency of missing drugs. Ben treats Adrian, an undocumented sex worker, off the books. Dom apologizes to Zanna for freezing up during an overdose case, explaining that he saw his sister die in an identical manner. Experiencing withdrawal, Ben convinces one of the nurses to take some tilidine from the cabinet for him, but Zanna catches the nurse and fires him, refusing to believe when he rats out Ben. Dom's fiancé sees Zanna speaking to him about his sister, and asks him "What sister?". Olivia and Emina go out for drinks together, while Zanna spots a dealer selling the same drugs that patients died from taking that day, and receives a head wound in a fight after destroying the drugs. At the hospital, Ben staples closed her injury after being sworn to secrecy.
4	"Treatment" (German: Behandlung)	Fabian Möhrke	Julia Drache, Lisa van Brakel, and Korbinian Hamberger	March 12, 2025
Olaf and Olivia bring in Daniel, a drag queen with stomach pain. The undocumented man who Ben helped returns with his 17 year old cousin, who is also undocumented and shows symptoms of syphilis. Later, Zanna reveals to Ben over drinks that earlier she called her brother-in-law and former boss, Ruben, whom she slept with before moving to Berlin. At the hospital, patients slip through the cracks as Dom fails to hold down the night shift. When one of his errors is on the verge of being discovered, Olivia catches him falsifying a patient's chart and blaming the incident on a nurse. As part of a broad effort to bring more profit to the hospital, Zanna advises Daniel to get routine surgery, despite his aversion to the procedure. Ben finds Viktoria dead of an overdose, and, shaken, he gets fentanyl from the undocumented mens' pimp.
5	"Side Effects" (German: Nebenwirkungen)	Alex Schaad	Lisa van Brakel, Anika Soisson, and Raquel Dukpa	March 19, 2025
Olaf and Olivia respond to a call at a care home and find a dire state of neglect. Afrim is upset when he learns of Emina's plans to potentially move to Munich for work. Ben begins taking larger doses of fentanyl while on shift. Daniel Neumann returns with severe sepsis from complications resulting from his surgery. Olivia confronts Dom about his cover-up, but he gaslights her into staying silent. Afrim is brought into the ER, badly beaten by the police and in a coma. Ben must operate on him while still high, and afterwards throws out his remaining fentanyl.
6	"Self-Medication" (German: Selbstmedikation)	Alex Schaad	Lisa van Brakel and Paulina Lorenz	March 26, 2025
Adrian returns to the hospital to ask Ben to treat two more boys, but Ben refuses to help. After getting covered in blood from a patient, Ben and Zanna go to get changed in the locker room and end up making out. Emina confronts the policeman who beat her brother into a coma, and Ben must stop her from physically attacking him. Dom's fiancé brings in her father, Thomas, after he falls down the stairs, and when his condition suddenly worsens while waiting for a room, Kian determines that the signs of a heart attack had been missed, so Dom sneaks into a room to conduct an EKG on himself, and gives it to Zanna as if it were Thomas's. Ben, struggling after going cold turkey, breaks into the drug cabinet to steal fentanyl, and stumbles into a stairwell to inject it. Zanna and Kian find him, unconscious.
7	"End Stage" (German: Endstadium)	Alex Schaad	Lisa van Brakel and Raquel Dukpa	April 2, 2025
Revived with nalaxone, Ben is brought to Kian's apartment to recover under the radar. Olaf and Olivia argue and bet on whether Olivia can successfully respond to a call without Olaf's help, but she forgets to check for a disability and misdiagnoses the patient. Emina meets with Ruben and other management from the Munich hospital, and despite their personalities clashing, Ruben offers her the rather cushy position. Ruben also comes to see Zanna at the hospital, hoping to rekindle their relationship, but Zanna tells him that there was never anything between them besides a hook-up, and she regrets even that. Olaf and Olivia continue to fight over their differing perspectives while answering a call at a barren lake with poor cell reception. While arguing, Olaf goes into cardiac arrest, but Olivia is able to save him.
8	"Remission" (German: Remission)	Unknown	Samuel Jefferson and Lisa van Brakel	April 9, 2025
A massive fire at Venti, a nearby nightclub, sends the ER into overdrive. Dom, already near the site, runs inside and begins helping people despite the building beginning to collapse. At the hospital, Zanna implements an emergency triage system with color-coded tagging. Despite his recent overdose, Ben arrives at the hospital to help. Zanna argues that he can't work in this state, but Ben convinces her to let him have morphine. Dom convinces another first responder to help those trapped deep within the building, and inside they find Alex Witte, who the other responder carries out to safety. But once at the hospital, Emina refuses to help her brother's killer until Olivia convinces her to save him. The pair almost kiss, but are interrupted by Olivia's new lead EMT, ready to head back to the site. When Olivia returns, she realizes Dom is nowhere to be seen. She runs back into the evacuated building and locates him, but is unable to free him before the building collapses. In the hospital ambulance bay, a Berlin politician gives a press conference, and announces that the hospital has been bought by Cure Pulse Equity, the company who ran the neglected care home, and will become a private clinic. As the morning breaks, Emina tells the other doctors of her intent to stay in Berlin, and Zanna tells Ben she won't fire him, but they'll talk again after he completes rehab.

== Production ==
=== Writing ===
Berlin ER draws upon the medical experience of its head writer, Samuel Jefferson, who worked as an emergency physician in a London hospital. Jefferson had attended the London Film School in his twenties while working part-time in the hospital, and wrote several plays and short films in the following years, later attending the German Film and Television Academy Berlin. It was around this time that he began working on what would become ''Berlin ER'' about 7-8 years later.

While creating Berlin ER, Jefferson found that despite different systems, doctors in both the UK and Germany faced similar difficulties including long hours, arduous stress, and low wages. Jefferson also sought to portray the capitalization of the health system in England, which rewards doctors for pressuring patients into unnecessary procedures so the hospital can profit, and was surprised to learn that Germany faced the same issue despite the country's good healthcare reputation.

Jefferson has cited British black comedy drama Trainspotting and iconic American medical drama ER as major references while creating KRANK Berlin.

=== Development ===
In February 2023, Sky Germany Vice President Tobias Rosen announced at the Berlin Film Festival that two original German-language drama series had been commissioned, among them was KraNK Berlin, a dark comedy eight-part series set at the fictional Neukölln Hospital. The title, an abbreviation of Krankenhaus Neukölln-Kreuzberg, was a pun on the German word krank, meaning sick or weird (although the hospital is referred to as the Nuria Kastorf Hospital in the show). However, in June of the same year, Sky Germany announced that it would be ceasing production on all new scripted original Sky series in 2024, citing the rising costs of producing dramas and difficulties cutting through the many international streaming giants.

Since the show was not officially cancelled, co-producers Real Film and Violet Pictures were able to keep the rights for the series and explore alternative buyers. Two months later, they found the show's new home at ZDF. Beta Film also boarded the production in January 2024, prior to the show's presentation at a European Film Market showcase, an initiative which showcases new serials to international professionals. At this showcase, Apple TV+ expressed interest, and in June 2024, it was announced that Apple TV+ had boarded the show alongside ZDF and would have exclusive global rights.

In September 2025, it was announced that the show had been renewed for a second series, with a release date estimate not yet announced.

=== Filming ===
The cast took ER internships or training in order to learn the various attitudes and skills displayed by emergency room workers. The extras included real nurses and hospital staff, and a medical advisor was on set to ensure accuracy.

Filming for the first series of Berlin ER began in the fall of 2024, on location at the SEZ in Berlin, a former East German sports and recreation center, and wrapped in December 2024.. Filming for the second series took place in the winter of the following year.

== Release ==
The first series released episodes on Apple TV+ beginning on February 26, 2025, available on the platform worldwide. One episode a week was released on Wednesdays after the initial two-episode drop, with the series finale airing on April 9, 2025. Originally, it was planned that the show would become available on the free streaming service ZDFneo after one year of the series' premiere, but this was later postponed to early November 2026.

== Reception ==
=== Critical Response ===
The review aggregator website Rotten Tomatoes reported a 100% approval rating based on 7 critic reviews. Media reviews echoed this positive reception, with comparisons being drawn to shows such as Succession, M*A*S*H, ER, and The Pitt. However, some reviews draw a distinction between Berlin ER and these shows, citing its moments of humor, unique intensity, and messy authenticity in the landscape of German television. Additionally, the show's choice to focus on overarching plot and social analysis rather than a "case-of-the-week" approach is lauded as a unique take on the medical drama genre. Reviews praised the authentic feel of the series, and its accurate representation of the emotional turmoil of working in a high-pressure emergency room. The performances of the cast, as well as the choice of the casting department to select previously relatively unknown talent, was also seen as favorable. Berlin ER appeared on Die Zeit's list of 2025's best television series, with praise given to its gritty aesthetic.

=== Awards and nominations ===
Year	Award	Category	Recipients	Result	Ref
2025	German Television Awards (German: Deutscher Fernsehpreis)	Best Drama Series	—N/a	Won	
2025	German Television Awards (German: Deutscher Fernsehpreis)	Best Actress	Haley Louise Jones	Nominated	
2025	German Television Awards (German: Deutscher Fernsehpreis)	Best Actor	Slavko Popadić	Nominated	
2025	German Television Awards (German: Deutscher Fernsehpreis)	Best Directing Fiction	Alex Schaad and Fabian Möhrke	Nominated	
2025	German Television Awards (German: Deutscher Fernsehpreis)	Best Editing Fiction	Julia Kovalenko, Gesa Jäger, Bobby Good, and Adrienne Hudson	Nominated	
2025	German Television Awards (German: Deutscher Fernsehpreis)	Best Cinematography Fiction	Jieun Yi and Tim Kuhn	Won	
2025	German Acting Awards (German: Deutscher Schauspielpreis)	Duo Award	Bernhard Schütz and Samirah Breuer	Nominated	
2025	German Acting Awards (German: Deutscher Schauspielpreis)	Ensemble Award	—N/a	Won	
2026	Germany Television Academy Awards (German: Die Auszeichnung der Deutschen Akademie für Fernsehen)	Casting Award	Liza Stutzky, Andrea Rodríguez, and Greta Baumann	Won	
2026	Germany Television Academy Awards (German: Die Auszeichnung der Deutschen Akademie für Fernsehen)	Production Award	Alexis von Wittgenstein, Henning Kamm, Gilda Weller, and Doris Büning	Won	
2026	Germany Television Academy Awards (German: Die Auszeichnung der Deutschen Akademie für Fernsehen)	Makeup Award	Anna Kunz and Jörn Seifert	Nominated	
2026	Germany Television Academy Awards (German: Die Auszeichnung der Deutschen Akademie für Fernsehen)	Supporting Actress Award	Şafak Şengül	Won	
2026	TeleVisionale Awards (German: TeleVisionale Preise)	German Series Award	—N/a	Nominated	
2026	Grimme Awards (German: Grimme-Preis)	Best Fiction	—N/a	Nominated	
2026	Grimme Awards (German: Grimme-Preis)	Student Jury Award	—N/a	Won	
