= Tiny World =

American nature docuseries

- Promotional poster
- Genre: Nature documentary
- Written by: Tom Hugh-Jones
- Starring: Paul Rudd
- Composers: Benjamin wallfisch and Chris Egan
- Country of origin: United States
- Original language: English
- No. of seasons: 2
- No. of episodes: 12

Production
- Executive producers: Martha Holmes; Tom Hugh-Jones; Grant Mansfield
- Producer: Paul Rudd
- Cinematography: Simon De Glanville
- Running time: 30 minutes
- Production company: Plimsoll Productions

Original release
- Network: Apple TV+
- Release: October 2, 2020 – April 16, 2021

Tiny World is an English nature documentary television series created by Tom Hugh-Jones, and narrated by Paul Rudd. The series premiered on October 2, 2020 on Apple TV+, with a second season premiering on April 16, 2021.

== Premise ==
Tiny World "showcases nature’s lesser-known tiny heroes. Spotlighting small creatures and the things they do to survive, each episode is filled with surprising stories and cinematography."

== Episodes ==
=== Series overview ===
Season	Episodes	Originally released
1	6	October 2, 2020
2	6	April 16, 2021

=== Season 1 (2020) ===
No. overall	No. in season	Title	Directed by	Original release date
1	1	"Savannah"	Sam Hume	October 2, 2020
Discover how an elephant shrew and other incredible little animals of the African savannah survive as the largest migration on Earth barrels their way.
2	2	"Jungle"	Robert Wilcox	October 2, 2020
A strawberry poison dart frog and countless other tiny animals live on a giant jungle tree. See how they cope when their world comes crashing down.
3	3	"Island"	Andrew Moorwood	October 2, 2020
When hurricane season hits the Caribbean, and destroys the nest of a bee hummingbird, some of the planet's smallest animals fight to survive the most powerful storms on Earth.
4	4	"Outback"	Lucy Wells	October 2, 2020
Australia's gumtree forests are full of fantastical little creatures, like a tiny sugar glider, but it's only a matter of time before their homes go up in flames.
5	5	"Woodland"	Ed Watkins	October 2, 2020
A chipmunk hustles to make it through a year in the forest, while a host of other incredible tiny animals seize every opportunity.
6	6	"Garden"	Alex Ranken	October 2, 2020
A European hamster escapes death, finding herself in a British garden. Explore the world of small wonders and miniature heroes that live beneath your feet in the backyard.

=== Season 2 (2021) ===
No. overall	No. in season	Title	Directed by	Original release date
7	1	"Meadow"	Matt Richards	April 16, 2021
An adorable Eurasian harvest mouse, queen bumblebee, and other little critters race to make the most of summer before their home is harvested for hay.
8	2	"Desert"	Victoria Webb	April 16, 2021
Tiny creatures, like a ground squirrel pup, must learn how the cacti that cover their home can help them survive a long, hot, dangerous summer.
9	3	"Pond"	David Johnson	April 16, 2021
Filmed in Algonquin Provincial Park in Ontario, Canada. From ducklings to dragonflies, all sorts of tiny wonders live in freshwater but when you're a small animal in a big pound, life is full of danger.
10	4	"Rainforest"	Alex Ranken	April 16, 2021
Journey to Madagascar to discover the extraordinary superpowers that little creatures must use to survive in the mysterious rainforest.
11	5	"Reef"	Sophie Morgan	April 16, 2021
Explore an underwater world of incredible creatures as the tiny residents of a coral reef prepare for the most important night of the year.
12	6	"Dune"	John Capener	April 16, 2021
Life in the shifting sands of the Namib desert is so extreme it has forced small creatures to evolve extraordinary powers to help them triumph.

== Production ==
Tiny World creator Tom Hugh-Jones says filming took about one year, but if all filming days were added up, it would total nearly 10 years of shooting to capture nearly 200 species of small animals. Altogether, they filmed about 3160 hours of footage with around 20 teams at different locations around the world.

The idea to have Paul Rudd narrate Tiny World came from his recent role as Ant-Man.

== Critical reception ==
Tiny World has been praised. Decider said, "the spectacular cinematography on Tiny World is more than enough to tune in, but the storytelling and Paul Rudd’s narration support the cinematography well." TV Insider called the series "visually captivating". saying it "will convince you to look closer at the world's more minute inhabitants."
