= The 1940s House =

2001 British television series

- Region 2 PAL DVD (UK)
- Genre: Historical reenactment reality television
- Country of origin: United Kingdom
- No. of seasons: 1
- No. of episodes: 5

Production
- Executive producer: Alex Graham
- Running time: 45 min.

Original release
- Network: Channel 4
- Release: 2 January – 25 January 2001

The 1940s House is a British historical reenactment reality television series made by Wall to Wall/Channel 4 in 2001 about a modern family that tries to live as a typical middle-class family in London during The Blitz of World War II. The program was broadcast on Channel 4 in the United Kingdom in 2001, and in 2002 on PBS in the United States, ABC Television in Australia, and TVNZ in New Zealand. The series was narrated in the UK by Geoffrey Palmer.

== Production ==
=== Conception ===
The success of The 1900 House led Channel 4 to revisit the idea of taking a family back in time again. The 1940s House was originally conceived with only four episodes. The concept of the show was different from that of The 1900 House: instead of focusing on the family's ability to cope without modern conveniences, this one focused on the family's ability to pull together under uncertainty and fear.

=== Filming and Location ===
The house is at 17 Braemar Gardens, West Wickham, Kent, in the United Kingdom (now a suburb of Greater London). Series art director Lia Kramer, who had helped create The 1900 House, identified the property and oversaw its restoration. The Tudorbethan house, originally built in 1932 by Bradfield Bros & Murphy, was retrofitted to reflect the technology and fashions of a middle-class English home of the late 1930s. It is a gable-ended, three-bedroom, semi-detached home. A boiler fuelled by coke provided hot water, and there was no telephone or refrigerator. Sold for 875 pounds in 1932, the producers purchased the house for £187,000 in 1999. The house was in excellent structural condition, and no major renovations had occurred. Restoration included the removal of central heating and radiators, the custom-fitted kitchen cabinets and appliances, and the carpeting. Removal of the carpeting revealed checkerboard floor tiles. Several fireplaces were restored to working condition, and the original French doors which led outside to the patio were reinstalled. The producers discovered that the house had incurred bomb damage during World War II, and that the owner of the home had suffered a fatal heart attack putting out a fire caused by a bomb in the backyard garden in 1942. The home's original paint was uncovered, and discovered to be bright blues, pinks, and greens. 1940s-era floral wallpaper was purchased and reinstalled in some areas of the home (including the entryway). The house was decorated in a style typical of the 1930s, which included some used Victorian furniture and a small number of Art Deco pieces. The existing beds were replaced by iron bedsteads (including twin beds for Michael and Lyn). When neighbours learned of the project, many donated period home furnishings for free. A 1930s-style gas-fired cooking stove, Belfast sink, draining board, metal-topped table, and fold-down work shelf were installed in the kitchen. The garden was revamped to be typical of a victory garden.

The family had to act like a typical family of the time, which included the sewing of blackout curtains, building an air-raid shelter, and confronting wartime food rationing. Air raids were simulated during the show, forcing the family to take refuge in its air-raid shelter. The near-nightly sound of the air-raid siren (fixed in a hallway in the home) left the family unnerved, even after they returned to their regular lives. The family had to stay in character all the time, including when the boys went to school. Period clothing (including underwear) were worn at all times. At night, Lyn and Kirstie had to set their hair in rollers. Even minor aspects of life (such as the depth of water in the bath tub, which could be no deeper than five inches) were regulated.

A special section was established in the rear of a local delicatessen where the family could shop for 1940s-era food, but which also suffered from "wartime rationing" to mimic real conditions.

Filming began on 15 April 2000, and lasted nine weeks. Unlike other historical reality television shows, the Hymers were not isolated. Their neighbours helped them dig their air-raid shelter, the family visited a retirement home (in costume and in character), and the house was visited by individuals who worked in government or the military during the Blitz. Nonetheless, Lyn Hymers later said in an interview that the family did feel isolated, and never got the sense of community spirit that people living in the 1940s would have felt.

The 1940s House was put on the market for £212,000 and sold to a private owner after production wrapped.

== Broadcast and Release ==
There were five episodes:

- Episode 1: The Home Front (2 January 2001) - The series is introduced, the family moves in, war breaks out, and food rationing is confronted for the first time.
- Episode 2: Into the Unknown (4 January 2001) - Michael Hymers leaves the house for three weeks for work-related reasons, and the family confronts additional rationing.
- Episode 3: Women at War (11 January 2001) - Lyn and Kirstie join the Women's Voluntary Service and work in the war industry.
- Episode 4: The Beginning of the End (18 January 2001) - The family suffers from air-raids, sleep deprivation, and bomb damage before learning that the war is over. They also listen to radio stories about the liberation of Bergen-Belsen concentration camp.
- Episode 5: The Homecoming (25 January 2001) - Six months later, the Hymers reflect on their time in 1940s House.

PBS aired the series in the U.S. between 4 November and 2 December 2002, which reviewers and members of the Hymers family felt reduced American viewership. The series also screened in Australia on ABC Television in 2002, airing several months before its predecessor, The 1900 House.

== The Hymers family ==
The 1940s House was inhabited by the Hymers family: Father Michael; mother Lyn; daughter Kirstie (age 29 when the series was produced); and Kirstie's sons Ben (age 10) and Thomas (age 7). The family applied to be on the series after reading an ad in Radio Times. More than 300 families auditioned for the show. Michael Hymers is a 1940s enthusiast, which was a factor in getting the family chosen for the show. The producers also felt the Hymers were well-spoken but also argumentative, which would make for good television as well as showcase a 1940s family's need to pull together.

The family and producers were advised by a "war cabinet" of historians and others who helped advise on the home's renovation, educated the Hymers about life in 1940-1941, and evaluated the family's behaviour during the show to ensure it conformed to 1940s standards. The show's chief advisor was British historian Juliet Gardiner. The family was advised on cooking and air-raid issues by home economist Marguerite Patten. The "war cabinet" also challenged the family at times: At one point, grandson Ben was named "fuel warden" and was given supervision of the family's fuel consumption. However, the family did admit to some cheating: Michael Hymers used Brylcreem for his hair, Thomas secretly listened to music by S Club 7, and both boys obtained modern snacks such as crisps from schoolmates. Lyn Hymers attempted to trade some of the show's authentic 1940s props to the neighbours for cigarettes. At another point, the family members refused to slaughter rabbits for food, and the producers had to provide them with dressed rabbit carcasses instead.

The family was significantly affected by the experience in the 1940s House. Michael and Lyn Hymers' relationship nearly ruptured, as Michael was away at work much of the time and was not aware of how difficult life was for the rest of the family. Kirstie worried that her children were not getting enough to eat and considered leaving the show. Most family members lost weight and believed their health and physical fitness improved. The Hymers' younger daughter, Jodie, visited the set, and enjoyed making a puppet show with Ben and Thomas but then Lyn and Michael resolved not to see anyone from outside the show thereafter. Jodie and her husband Iain attended a themed party with the rest of the family dressing up in 1940s attire. After the show, however, Lyn Hymers became as much of a 1940s enthusiast as her husband, the family bought a car manufactured in 1949, Michael and Lyn Hymers shopped at neighbourhood stores rather than supermarkets, Lyn Hymers did much more home cooking, and Michael Hymers used a tin bathtub heated by the home fireplace. Although Ben and Thomas have not given up video games completely, their experiences without them in the 1940s House led them to prefer board games or their own made-up games now. The family developed such a taste for Spam and served it as a birthday dish. Lyn Hymers admitted that she suffered from depression after the series ended, overwhelmed by how hard life had been for women in the 1940s. Although the family felt the work was hard, the adults also agreed there was less emotional and intellectual pressure and they became much closer during the show.

== Reception ==
The show was well received by critics. The Newcastle upon Tyne Evening Chronicle said "the series gives an extraordinary insight into life as it was lived by the majority of the population during World War Two." The Halifax Daily News called the show "classy stuff" and concluded that the series' locale (a relatively modern home) made it more attractive to viewers than similar shows set in woods or on the plains. Several reviewers pointed out that the fact-based nature of the show was impressive, with The Hartford Courant declaring it "a great way to mix the facts of history with the voyeurism of reality programming". The Seattle Post-Intelligencer felt the show was "supremely instructive" and was "compelling in spite of its obvious disclosures" because of the large amounts of factual information imparted by the narrator and "war cabinet" throughout the series. The newspaper also felt that real star of the show was Lyn Hymers, who had to cope with an absent husband and do most of the work. Reviewers often pointed out the show's subtle indictment of economic materialism. For example, The Guardian noted: "The relationship of The 1940s House with the present-day is much more complicated. Though never overtly editorial, the series inevitably becomes a critique of modern materialism and complacency."

Not all reviews, however, were positive. Writing in The Times, Peter Barnard lauded the show's goal of attempting to educate viewers about the past, but concluded that The 1940s House failed in this respect.

"What I don't get is the point. I don't think Channel 4 gets the point, either. The 1900 House was an interesting piece of work, but the fatal flaw in its successor is that it is materialistic. The point about the Second World War was that it presented the possibility of violent death to every section of the population at any moment, something that is impossible to replicate artificially. Living on Spam or building an Anderson shelter were, surely, the incidental inconveniences of wartime. The real inconvenience was the fear that you could wake up in the middle of the night to find that your bed had been set on fire by a man passing overhead in an aeroplane. It seems to me that The 1940s House replicates wartime living the way a Formula One computer game replicates being Michael Schumacher: you get everything except the downside risk, which is at the very centre of the experience."

Dru Sefton writing for the Current, covering the entire early "House" series (as of 2003), noted that it "netted more than 7 million viewers and scored a 2.0 rating compared to a season average of 1.8" but also that compared to Frontier House, "it bombed. Some public TV programmers panned the show because, despite faux air raids, it failed to evoke the destruction of wartime London. PBS broadcast the three-hour program on a single night and gave it little promotion."

The 1940s House was a ratings success, prompting Channel 4 to begin work on The Edwardian Country House, a new reality series with a much-expanded cast and far greater production budget than The 1900 House and The 1940s House. The series' popularity in the U.S. led PBS to commission an American version of the show, Frontier House. The 1940s House was a similar ratings hit in Australia. A very large 53 per cent of professional, managerial, and skilled workers (the ABC Television network's key social demographic) watched the series.

The 1940s House was nominated for a Huw Weldon Award for Specialist Factual at the 2002 British Academy Television Awards (BAFTAs).

== Home media ==
The 1940s House was released in the UK by Acorn Media UK on VHS on 22 January 2001, with the company releasing a DVD version in 2007. The VHS was released in the US on 3 December 2002, and the DVD was issued on 5 August 2003 by PBS Direct.

A companion book, The 1940s House, was published in 2000 just before the series aired. The companion book was a major success, debuting at Number 1 on the Birmingham Post's hardcover best-seller list. An activity book for children also accompanied the series. A replica of the 1940s House was displayed at the Imperial War Museum.

== Similar Series ==
The 1940s House is one in a line of "time capsule" reality television series to air on Channel 4. Others in the genre with a similar format from the same production company include (in order of their airing in the UK):

- The 1900 House – A modern family attempts to live like a family in 1900 (the first series to air)
- The Edwardian Country House - A modern family lives like a wealthy Edwardian manor house family, while a group of disparate strangers portrays the manor house servants and staff (the third series to air). This series was known as The Manor House in the United States.
- Regency House Party - Ten modern men and women attend a manor house party set during the British Regency of the 1810s (the fourth series to air)
- Coal House – A modern family attempts to live like a family in a 1920s Welsh mining community (with two seasons, this was the fifth and sixth series to air)
- Victorian Slum House - Several families and individuals live in a recreated Victorian-era slum building for five weeks, with each week representing a decade from 1860 through 1900.
