= Victory garden =

Private food supply gardens in the World Wars

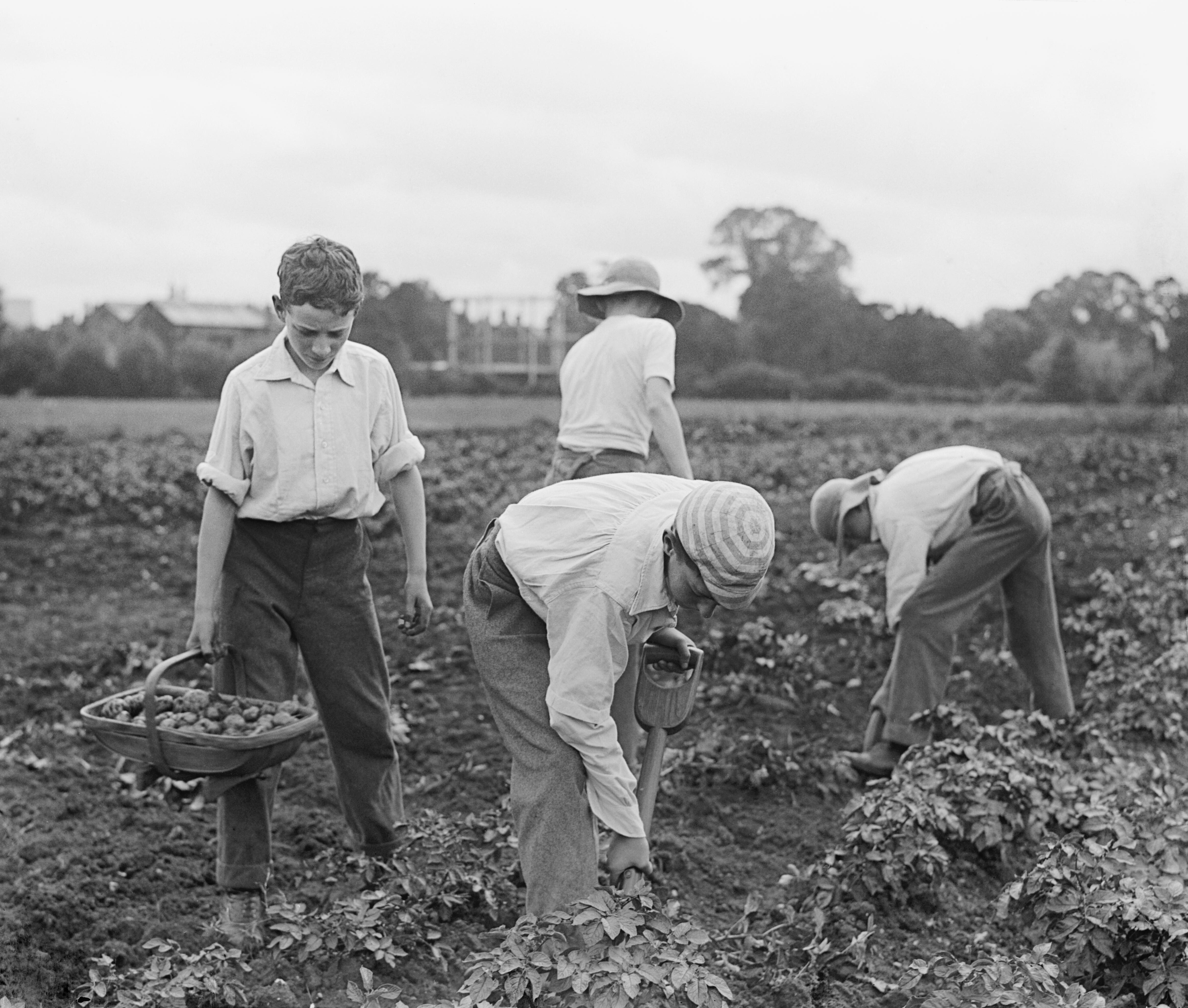
Eton schoolboys digging potatoes from a victory garden on the school's playing fields during World War I

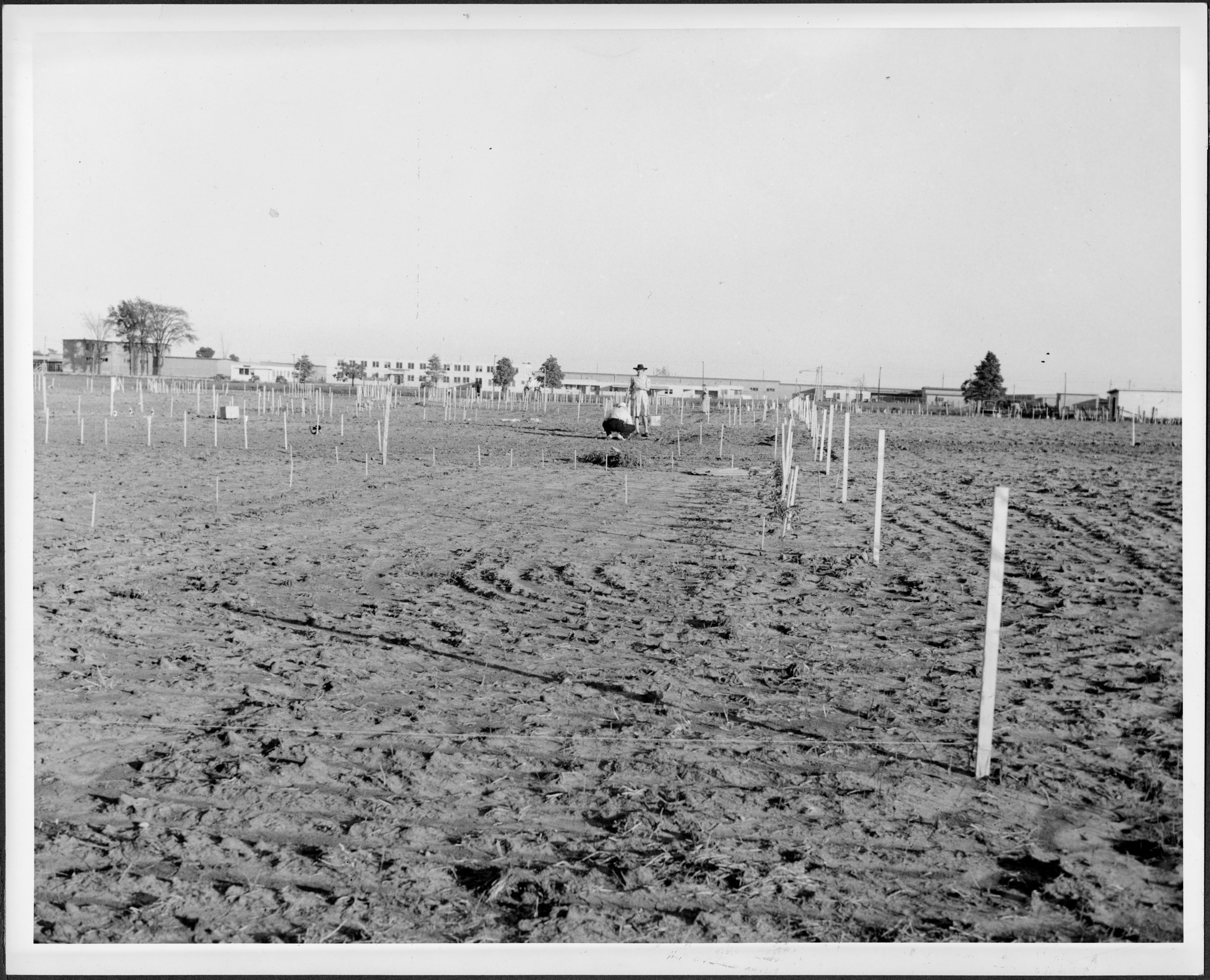
Victory garden in Ontario, Canada

Victory gardens, also called war gardens or food gardens for defense, were vegetable, fruit, and herb gardens planted at private residences and public parks in the United States, United Kingdom, Canada, Australia and Germany during World War I and World War II. In wartime, governments encouraged people to plant victory gardens not only to supplement their rations but also to boost morale. They were used along with rationing stamps and cards to reduce pressure on the food supply. Besides indirectly aiding the war effort, these gardens were also considered a civil "morale booster" in that gardeners could feel empowered by their contribution of labor and rewarded by the produce grown. This made victory gardens a part of daily life on the home front.

== World War I ==
=== Canada ===
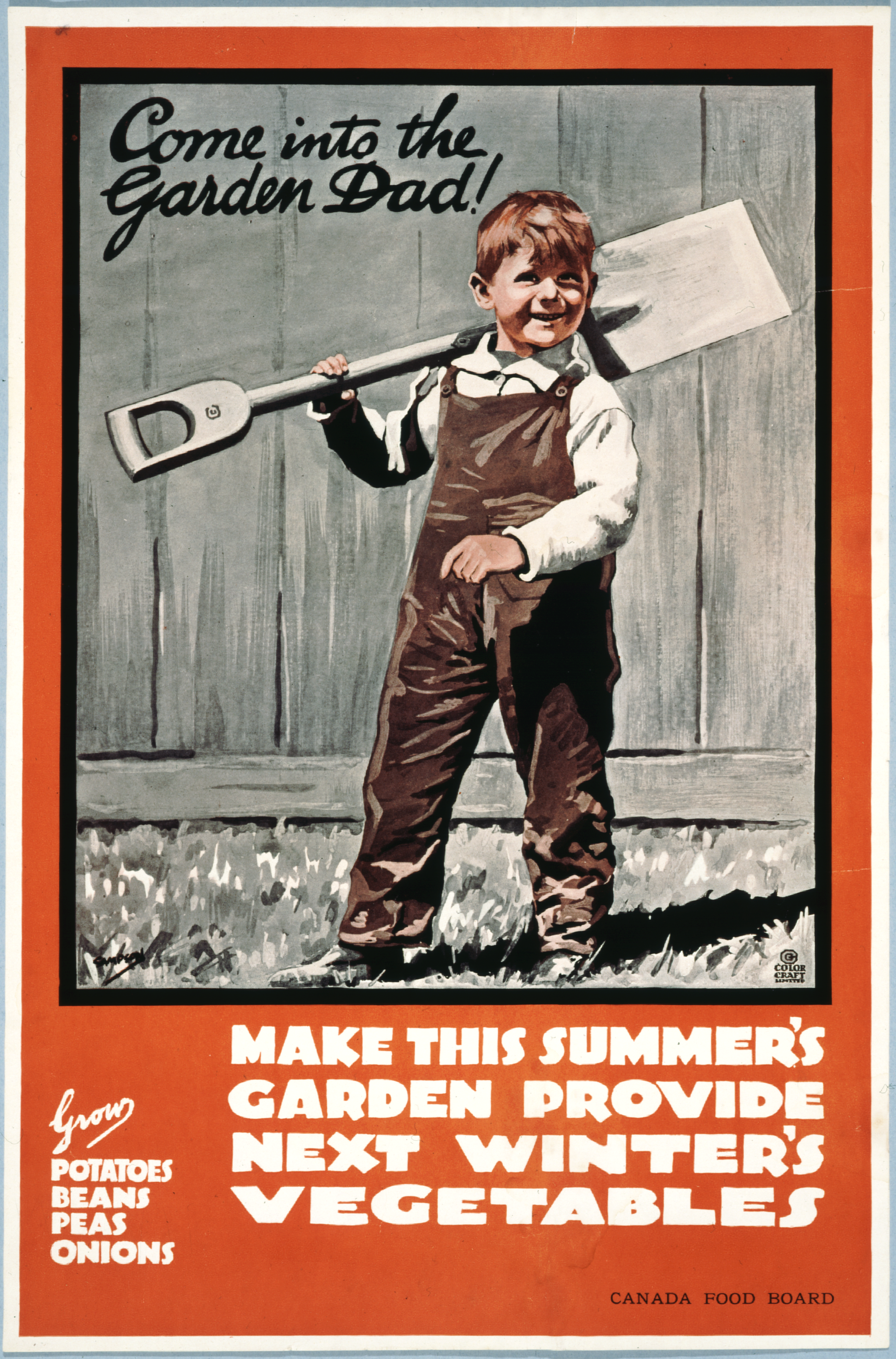
Come into the garden dad!, World War I poster from Canada (c. 1918), Archives of Ontario poster collection (I0016363)

Victory Gardens became popular in Canada in 1917. Under the Ministry of Agriculture's campaign, "A Vegetable Garden for Every Home", residents of cities, towns and villages utilized backyard spaces to plant vegetables for personal use and war effort. In the city of Toronto, women's organizations brought expert gardeners into the schools to get school children and their families interested in gardening. In addition to gardening, homeowners were encouraged to keep hens in their yards to obtain eggs. The result was a large production of potatoes, beets, cabbage, and other useful vegetables.

=== United States ===
WWI-era U.S. victory poster featuring Columbia sowing seeds

In March 1917, Charles Lathrop Pack organized the US National War Garden Commission and launched the war garden campaign. Food production had fallen dramatically during World War I, especially in Europe, where agricultural labor had been recruited into military service and remaining farms had been devastated by the conflict. Pack and others conceived the idea that the supply of food could be greatly increased without the use of land and manpower already engaged in agriculture, and without the significant use of transportation facilities needed for the war effort. The campaign promoted the cultivation of available private and public lands, resulting in over five million gardens in the U.S. The Food Administrator, Herbert Hoover, had the ambitious goal of sending 20 million tons of food to the war front by July 1919, although this number was reduced to 4 million in actuality. The campaign was a huge success, leading to foodstuff production exceeding $1.2 billion by the end of the war.

President Woodrow Wilson said that "Food will win the war." To support the home garden effort, a United States School Garden Army was launched through the Bureau of Education, and funded by the War Department at Wilson's direction.

== World War II ==
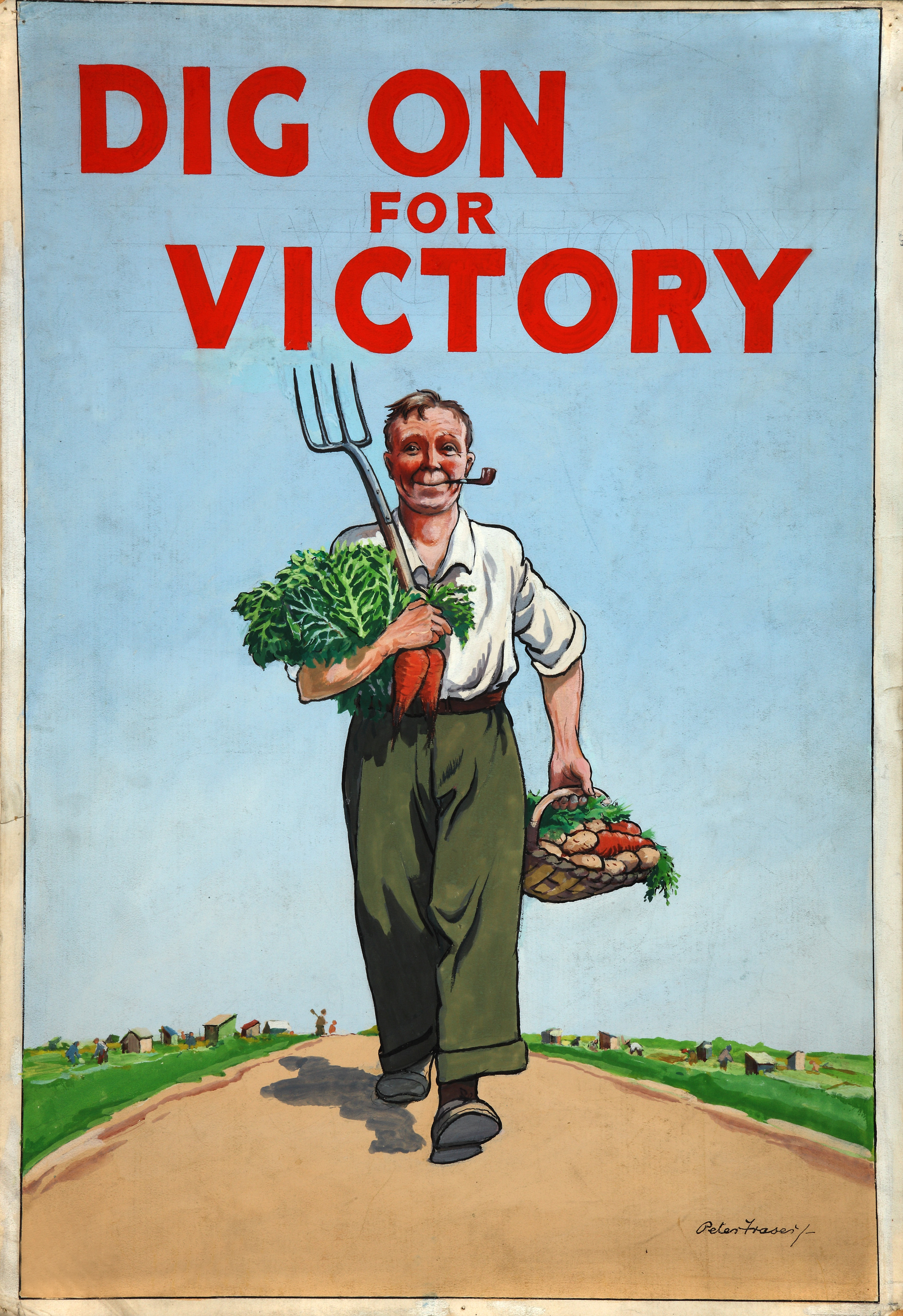
The British "Dig on for Victory" poster by Peter Fraser

=== Australia ===
In 1942, Australia's prime minister John Curtin launched a "Dig for Victory" campaign as rationing, drought, and a shortage of agricultural workers began to affect food supplies. This encouraged homeowners all over Australia to grow crops to help the war effort. The campaign was well received by the media as well as the large populace, as many Australians were already self-sufficient in growing their own fruits and vegetables. The YWCA created "Garden Army Week" to advertise the newly created "Garden Army" which exclusively supported agriculture and crop production. The situation began to ease in 1943 as fear of invasion lessened; however, home gardens continued throughout the war.

=== Britain ===
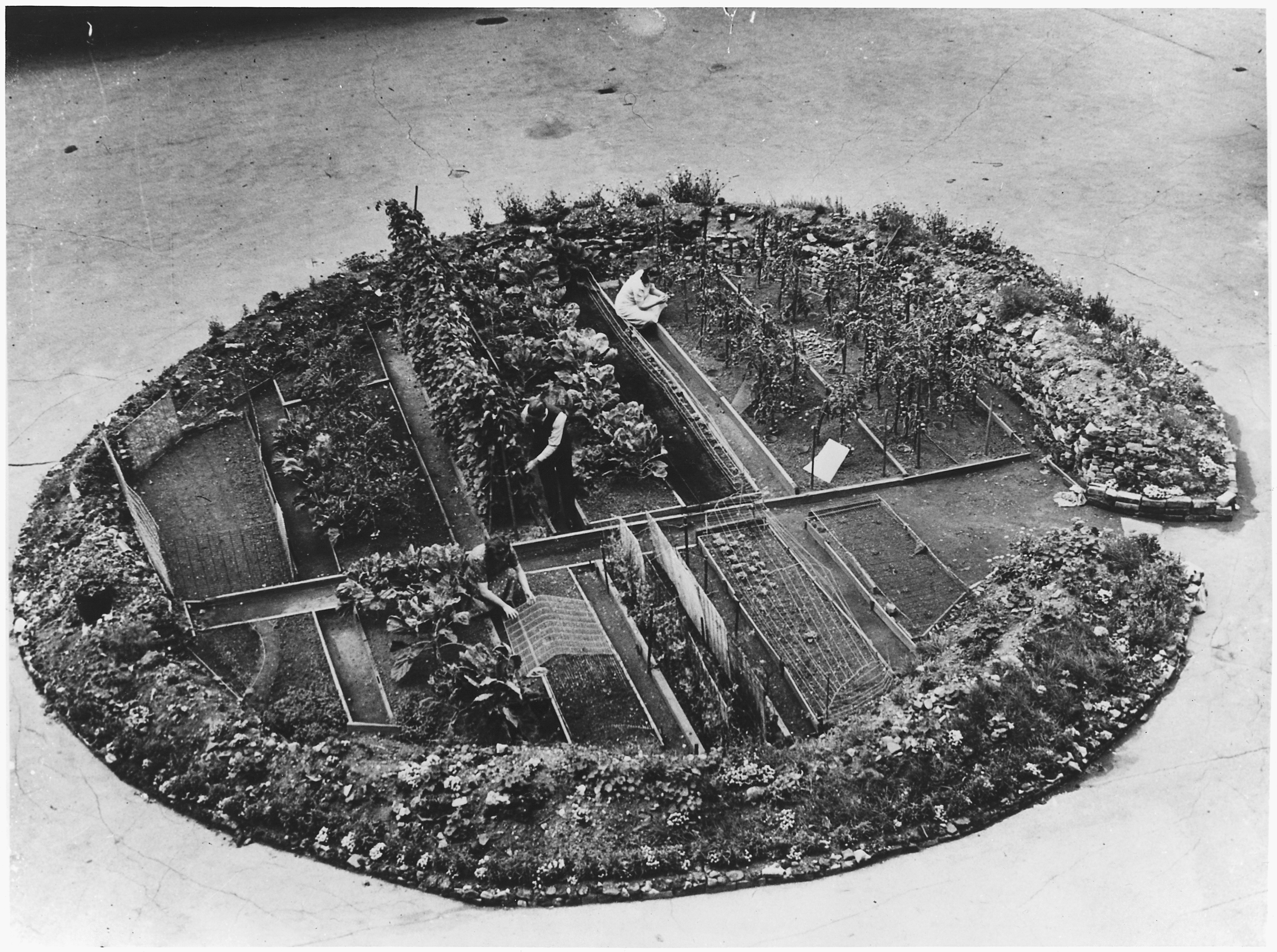
A victory garden in a bomb crater in London during WWII

In Britain, "digging for victory" used much land such as waste ground, railway edges, ornamental gardens and lawns, while sports fields and golf courses were requisitioned for farming or vegetable growing. Sometimes a sports field was left as it was but used for sheep-grazing instead of being mown (for example, see Lawrence Sheriff School § Effects of the Second World War). Other schools, like Winchester College, contributed their fields to grow vegetables for school consumption, supplementing the meagre soil fertility by raising pigs for their manure. By 1943, the number of allotments had roughly doubled to 1,400,000, including rural, urban and suburban plots. C. H. Middleton's radio programme In Your Garden reached millions of listeners keen for advice on growing potatoes, leeks and the like, and helped ensure a communal sense of contributing to the war effort (as well as a practical response to food rationing). County Herb Committees were established to collect medicinal herbs when German blockades created shortages, for instance in Digitalis purpurea (Foxglove) which was used to regulate heartbeat. Victory gardens were planted in backyards and on apartment-building rooftops, with the occasional vacant lot "commandeered for the war effort!" and put to use as a cornfield or a squash patch. During World War II, sections of lawn were publicly ploughed for plots in Hyde Park, London to promote the movement, while allotments growing onions in the shadow of the Albert Memorial also pointed to everybody, high and low, chipping in to the national struggle. Both Buckingham Palace and Windsor Castle had vegetable gardens planted at the instigation of King George VI to assist with food production. One Londoner reminisced many years later, "You couldn't buy artificial fertilisers in those days. But Grandpa kept his plants well-nourished. He swept our chimneys himself and kept the soot for the garden, and he collected lime mortar from bomb sites. Any wood ash was carefully kept, also the lawn mowings, and of course he had the manure and old bedding from the chook and rabbit pens. He made a small wooden cart which he pulled behind his bicycle. He rode round behind the baker, the milkman and the coalman, all of whom made their deliveries by horse and cart, collecting the droppings. Of course the local kids called out after him in the street, and teased me about my 'dirty Grandpa'. But he ignored them, and I learnt to do the same. He collected leaf-mould in the Autumn to add to the compost pile, which regularly received every scrap of organic waste he could garner. Bones were broken up with a hammer, (but not before they had spent hours in Gran's stockpot) and fish bones cut up with old scissors. The vacuum cleaner and the dustpans were always emptied on the heap, as were the teapot and the chamberpots we used at night. All tiny scraps of wool, thread and fabric also went in."

=== United States ===
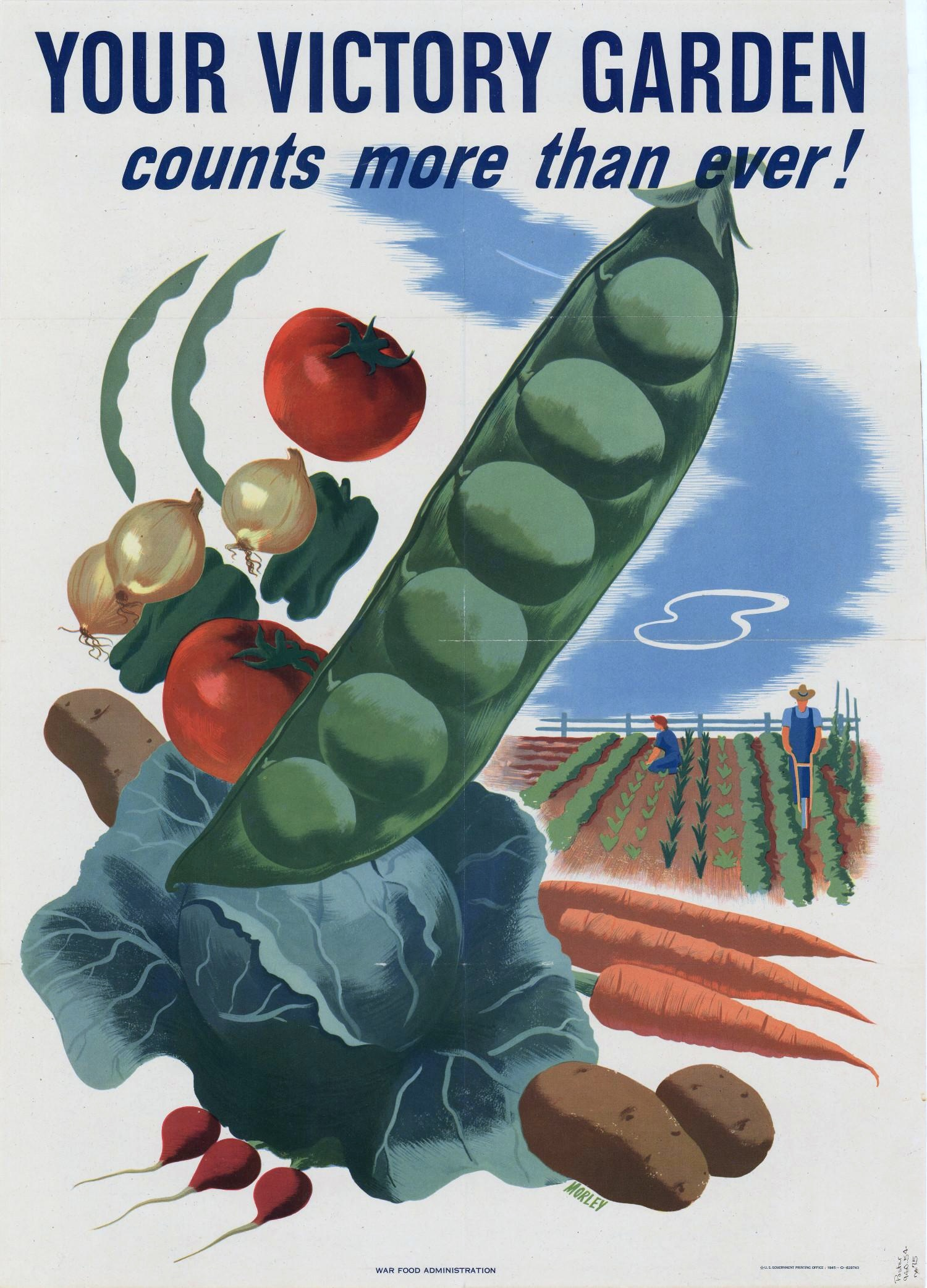
American WWII-era poster promoting victory gardens

Amid regular rationing of food in Britain, the United States Department of Agriculture encouraged the planting of victory gardens during the course of World War II. Around one third of the vegetables produced by the United States came from victory gardens. It was emphasized to American homefront urbanites and suburbanites that the produce from their gardens would help to lower the price of vegetables needed by the US War Department to feed the troops, thus saving money that could be spent elsewhere on the military: "Our food is fighting", one US poster read. By May 1943, there were 18 million victory gardens in the United States – 12 million in cities and 6 million on farms.

Eleanor Roosevelt planted a Victory Garden on the White House lawn in 1943. The Roosevelts were not the first presidency to institute a garden in the White House. Woodrow Wilson grazed sheep on the south lawn during World War I to avoid mowing the lawn. Eleanor Roosevelt's garden instead served as a political message of the patriotic duty to garden, even though Eleanor did not tend to her own garden. While Victory Gardens were portrayed as a patriotic duty, 54% of Americans polled said they grew gardens for economic reasons while only 20% mentioned patriotism.

Although at first the Department of Agriculture objected to Eleanor Roosevelt's institution of a victory garden on the White House grounds, fearing that such a movement would hurt the food industry, basic information about gardening appeared in public services booklets distributed by the Department of Agriculture, as well as by agribusiness corporations such as International Harvester and Beech-Nut. Fruit and vegetables harvested in these home and community plots was estimated to be 9,000,000–10,000,000 short tons (8,200,000–9,100,000 t) in 1944, an amount equal to all commercial production of fresh vegetables.

The Victory Garden movement also attempted to unite the home front. Local communities would have festivals and competitions to showcase the produce people grew in their own gardens. While the garden movement united some local communities, the garden movement separated minorities like African Americans. At harvest shows, separate prizes were awarded to "colored people", in similar categories, a long-held tradition in Delaware and the deeper South, as well as in Baltimore.

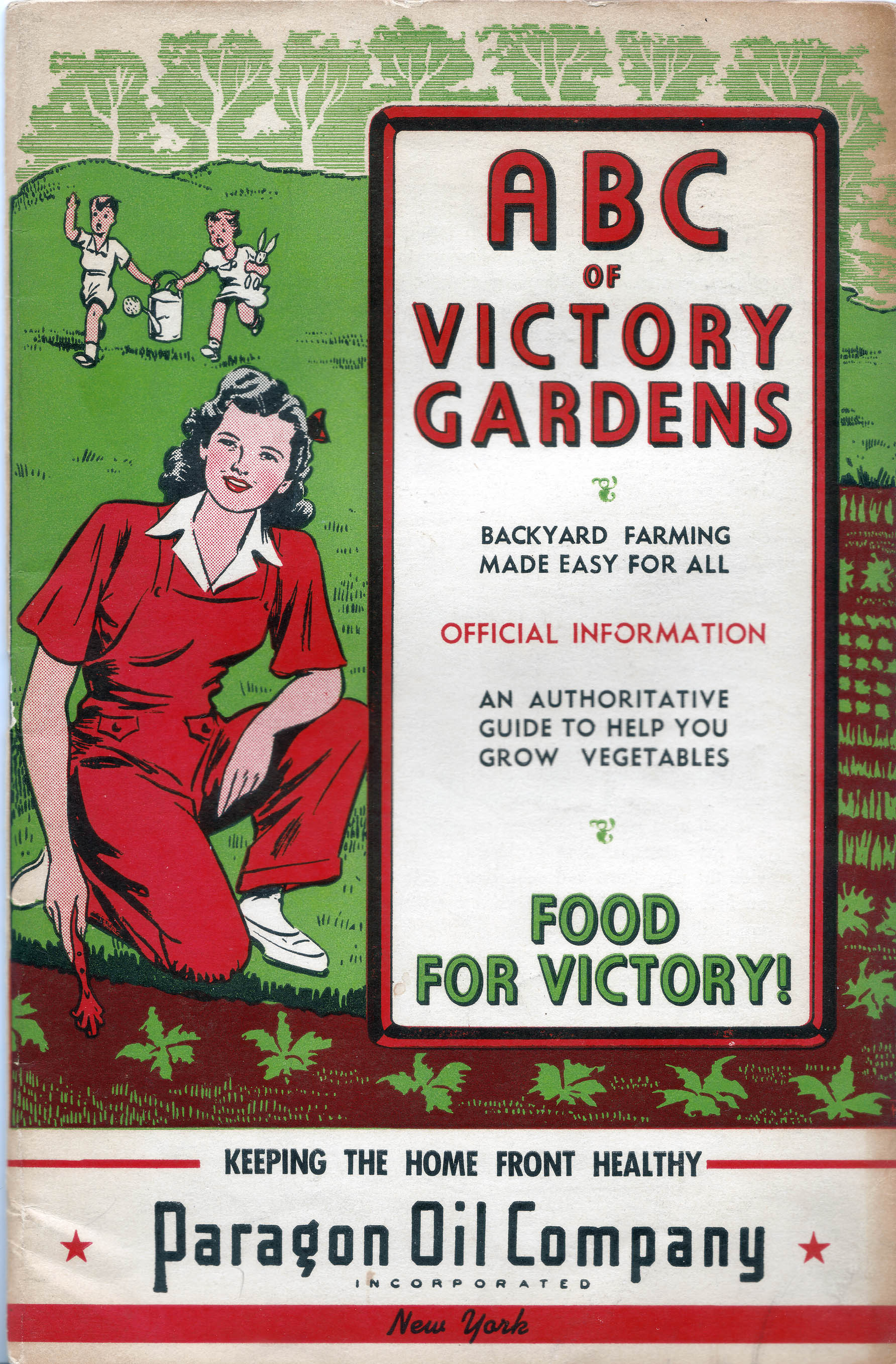
"ABC of Victory Gardens" cover page created by artist D.H. Bedford

In New York City, the lawns around vacant "Riverside" were devoted to victory gardens, as were portions of San Francisco's Golden Gate Park. The slogan "grow your own, can your own", was a slogan that started at the time of the war and referred to families growing and canning their own food in victory gardens.

During the heat of World War II, artist D.H. Bedford created a brochure for the U.S. Department of Agriculture summarizing everything the American populace would need to know about gardening. This was done in order to increase the production of crops from victory gardens, as food shortages on the war front were becoming a real problem. This brochure, "ABC of Victory Gardens", highlighted the importance of these victory gardens, as well as showing how to properly grow, harvest, and preserve a variety of crops.

In Japanese Internment Camps, government officials encouraged Victory Gardens to promote self-sufficiency and conserve resources. Individuals who were previously farmers before internment began growing vegetable gardens within camp boundaries. The movement toward Victory Gardens did not serve a patriotic purpose for the Japanese people, instead, the gardens supplemented government-issued meals with fresh vegetables and offered edibles reminiscent of home. Additionally, the relocation of Japanese-Americans increased the usage of victory gardens. Many vegetable and fruit farms were Japanese-owned on the West Coast. In preparation for the mass relocation of individuals, United States citizens were encouraged by government agencies, newspapers, and radio stations to utilize urban farming in preparation for a shortage of fresh fruits and vegetables.

A Victory Garden is like a share in an airplane factory. It helps win the War and it pays dividends too.

— Claude Wickard, U.S. Secretary of Agriculture

== Postwar ==
In 1946, with the war over, many British residents did not plant victory gardens, in expectation of greater availability of food. However, shortages remained in the United Kingdom, and rationing remained in place for at least some food items until 1954.

Land at the centre of the Sutton Garden Suburb in Sutton, London, was first put to use as a victory garden during World War II; before then it had been used as a recreation ground with tennis courts. The land continued to be used as allotments by local residents for more than 50 years until they were evicted by the then landowner in 1997. The land has since fallen into disuse.

The Fenway Victory Gardens in the Back Bay Fens of Boston, Massachusetts, and the Dowling Community Garden in Minneapolis, Minnesota, remain active as the last surviving public examples from World War II. Most plots in the Fenway Victory Gardens now feature flowers instead of vegetables while the Dowling Community Garden retains its focus on vegetables.

Since the turn of the 21st century, interest in victory gardens has grown. A campaign promoting such gardens has sprung up in the form of new victory gardens in public spaces, victory garden websites and blogs, as well as petitions to renew a national campaign for the victory garden and to encourage the re-establishment of a victory garden on the White House lawn. In March 2009, First Lady Michelle Obama planted a 1,100-square-foot (100 m^{2}) "Kitchen Garden" on the White House lawn, the first since Eleanor Roosevelt's, to raise awareness about healthy food.

Victory gardens regained some popularity during the COVID-19 lockdown in the United Kingdom, as a means of coping emotionally, as well as a way to mitigate the effects of panic buying and global supply chain issues, which caused food shortages.

=== Ukraine ===
Between 2022 and 2023, several victory garden campaigns were established in Ukraine after the Russian invasion of Ukraine in 2022.

== Films ==
Several countries produced numerous informational films about growing victory gardens.

=== Canada ===
- World War II
  - He Plants for Victory (1943)

=== United Kingdom ===
- World War I
  - Grow Vegetables For War Effort
  - War Garden Parade
- World War II
  - Dig For Victory! (1940, 1941, 1942)
  - Children's Allotment Gardens (1942)
  - Compost Heaps for Feeding (1942)
  - Digging For Victory (1943)
  - Winter Greens (1943)
  - Blitz on Bugs (1944)
  - Dig for Victory - Proceed According To Plan (1944)

=== United States ===
- World War II
  - Victory Gardens (1941, 1942, 1943)
  - Barney Bear's Victory Garden (1942)
  - As Ye Sow (1945)

== Television ==
Historical documentary and reality television series such as The 1940s House, Wartime Farm and the second season of Coal House place modern families in a recreated wartime settings, including digging victory gardens.

The WGBH public-television series The Victory Garden took the familiar expression to promote composting and intensive cropping for homeowners who wanted to raise some vegetables (and some flowers).

The 1975 sitcom The Good Life portrays the efforts of Tom and Barbara Good to become self-sufficient in their suburban home, including turning over most of their garden to vegetable production and a chicken coop. Tom explains to his baffled neighbours that "We're digging for victory!" despite their protests that "That was during the War..." Much of the early episodes follow the Goods' struggle to adapt to living from their victory garden.

== See also ==
- Australian Women's Land Army
- Community garden
- Home front during World War II
- List of garden types
- List of renewable resources produced and traded by the United Kingdom
- Rationing in the United Kingdom
- United States home front during World War II
- Women's Land Army
- Woman's Land Army of America
- Food Sovereignty
