= The 1900 House =

- PAL VHS cover (UK)
- Genre: Historical reenactment reality television
- Countries of origin: United States; United Kingdom
- No. of seasons: 1
- No. of episodes: 10 (UK); 5 (U.S.)

Production
- Running time: 50 min. (ep. 1, UK); 24 min. (eps. 2–9, UK); 77 min. (ep. 10, UK); 60 min. (U.S.)

Original release
- Network: Channel 4; PBS
- Release: 28 December 1999 – 3 July 2000

The 1900 House is a historical reenactment reality television series made by Wall to Wall/Channel 4 in 1999. The programme features a modern family attempting to live in the way of the late Victorians for three months in a modified house. It was first broadcast on Channel 4 in the United Kingdom and PBS in America (with American commentary).

The series was accompanied by the book 1900 House: Featuring Extracts from the Personal Diaries of Joyce and Paul Bowler and Their Family by Mark McCrum and Matthew Sturgis. It won a Peabody Award in 2000 for being "an often humorous, always perceptive, series about the realities of life in 1900 that reveals themes of perseverance, human adaptation and family dynamics."

== Development ==
The show's budget was $1.5 million.

=== The house ===
The 1900 House featured on the show is located at 50 Elliscombe Road, Charlton, South-East London (51.482475°N 0.032394°E). An 1890s-built two-storey terraced house with a drawing room, a dining room, a kitchen, a scullery, a bathroom, three bedrooms (there were actually four, but one was used as a safety room with a telephone) and an outside loo.

To make it the 1900 house, all modern elements were removed, including electricity, insulation, indoor toilet, and central heating. Period fixtures such as a 'copper' (a large pot used for heating washing clothes over a fire), cast-iron oven and fireplaces were installed. Gas lighting was reinstalled using original remaining pipes.

== The cast ==
=== The Bowler family ===
The Bowler family was composed of six people.

- Paul was the father of the family. In contemporary life, he was a Warrant Officer in the Royal Marines. In the house, he worked in the recruiting office in London (for two months; after that, he had to go to his regular job in the Marines). He felt that the role of "Man of the House" was difficult to act.
- Joyce was the mother of the family. In her normal life, she was a civil servant for Somerset Social Services. She looked after the family and later in her free time she looked at the growing suffragette movement. She had problems with her hair (shampoo hadn't yet been invented in 1900) and difficulty with incorporating her vegetarian diet into the project.
- Kathryn was a 16-year-old performing-arts student. In the house, she missed modern cleanliness, her friends and her social life.
- Ruth and Hilary were 11-year-old twins. In the house, they missed their friends and their music.
- Joe was a 9-year-old boy. In the house, he missed sweets and fast-food.

=== Other people ===
Daru Rooke was the consultant historian to the series who helped the family adjust to the 1900 lifestyle. He later visited the house for a dinner party with the family. He also equipped the family with a useful reference manual to aid their stay at the house, based on sources of the period such as Mrs. Beeton's Book of Household Management and Cassell's Household Guide.

Because looking after the house became difficult, the Bowlers decided to hire a maid-of-all-work. Elizabeth Lillington was chosen, however after a few weeks the family sacked her as Joyce decided that she could not reconcile her views on women's emancipation with employing a woman as a domestic. However, being 'liberated' was not the view Elizabeth herself took of her dismissal. It was pointed out that a woman in Elizabeth's position in 1900 would have faced desperate poverty had she been denied housekeeping work.

== Reception and analysis ==
PBS described the series as "classy voyeurism" and the place where "the sci-fi drama of time travel meets true-life drama." To distinguish the program from other reality television shows, PBS claimed their work has educational values, due to its focus on exploring history.

The show has been discussed by scholars as situated within the heritage tourism industry.

Accordin to Dru Sefton writing for the Current, the entire "House" series, of which 1900 was the first, has been well received by contemporary critics, with the American Frontier House receiving Emmy nominations. The 1900 House aired in the US, where it became a surprising hit. Howard Rosenberg writing for the Los Angeles Times opined that it is "a smart, charmingly droll nonfiction series", and "watching [the Bowlers] painfully cope was great fun and educational, a rare TV combination." Salon’s Joyce Millman called it "classy voyeurism [that] owes less to “Survivor” than it does to that seminal PBS reality series “An American Family” ", and "an intimate, eye-opening and completely fascinating look at how radically domestic life has changed over the past 100 years".

== Sequels and imitators ==
The success of 1900 House led to other related productions and co-productions, collectively known as the "House" series. It ended in 2006 with the Texas Ranch House.

Installments in the series, as well as imitators, include:

=== United Kingdom ===
- The 1940s House – a family "living" through the Second World War.
- The Edwardian Country House
- Regency House Party
- Coal House – a 1920s Welsh mining community
- Coal House at war – a 1944 Welsh mining community
- Victorian Slum House – London slum life during Victorian era
- The 1900 Island – a 1900 fishing village in Anglesey

=== Australia ===
- Outback House – a family running a sheep station in 1861 Outback Australia
- The Colony – Four families and several individual "convicts" try to live life in New South Wales of 1800.

=== New Zealand ===
- Pioneer House – essentially a New Zealand production of The 1900 House.
- Colonial House – a recreation of the experiences of typical British immigrants to Canterbury, c. 1850; complete with a Sea Voyage from Auckland to Lyttelton, tramping over the Bridle Path to Christchurch with their children and belongings, setting up house in a canvas tent, and eventually, building their own house.
- One Land – Also a recreation of New Zealand in the 1850s. It featured three families, one Pākehā and two Māori, and aimed to replicate the experiences of British migrants and the indigenous Māori of the period. The Māori families were housed in a traditional Māori Pā, and one of those families was specifically chosen for their knowledge of Māori language and customs. This family was asked to speak only Māori throughout the Series.

=== Germany ===
- Schwarzwaldhaus 1902 (Black Forest House 1902) – a family "living" without electricity in a traditional Black Forest house, on rural Kaltwasserhof in Münstertal (August 2001 – January 2002)
- Windstärke 8 – Das Auswandererschiff 1855 – about an emigration ship for the United States
- Die Bräuteschule 1958 – teenage girls attending a domestic science school in the 1950s
- Abenteuer 1900 – Leben im Gutshaus (The 1900 Adventure) – about a noble family and their servants in a manor in Mecklenburg-Vorpommern.
- Abenteuer 1927 – Sommerfrische (The 1927 Adventure) – life in the manor from Abenteuer 1900, this time in the Roaring Twenties
- Steinzeit – Das Experiment (The Stone Age Experiment) – life under conditions of the Stone Age.
- Die harte Schule der 50er Jahre (Difficult 1950s School) – teachers and students experiencing a boarding school under 1950s conditions.
- Abenteuer Mittelalter – Leben im 15. Jahrhundert (The Medieval Adventure) – people living in a 15th-century castle.

=== United States ===
- Frontier House – three families live as 1883 homesteaders in Montana
- Manor House – British family of five and staff of 14 live in a 1900 Scottish manor house (re-presentation of The Edwardian Country House, exactly the same but with bonus footage)
- Colonial House – set in the American frontier of 1628 (shown in the UK as Pioneer House)
- Texas Ranch House – set in the American frontier of 1867

=== Switzerland ===
- Leben wie zu Gotthelfs Zeiten (2004 TV series) – about a Swiss family living without modern technology in a traditional Swiss farmhouse as in the era of the Swiss author Jeremias Gotthelf (1797–1854), similar setting as in the German TV series Schwarzwaldhaus 1902, mentioned above

== Home video releases ==
The 1900 House was released, alongside The 1940s House by Acorn Media UK. It was released on VHS on 27 June 2000 and on DVD on 5 August 2003.

U.S. television broadcast
#	Episode list	Release date
1	A Year to Remember	28 December 1999
2	The Time Machine	12 June 2000
3	A Rude Awakening	19 June 2000
4	A Woman's Place	26 June 2000
5	The End of an Era	3 July 2000
