= Outback House =

- Genre: Historical reality television
- Country of origin: Australia
- No. of seasons: 1
- No. of episodes: 8

Production
- Executive producer: Ivo Burum
- Camera setup: digi beta
- Running time: 60 min.

Original release
- Network: ABC TV
- Release: 12 June – 31 July 2005

Outback House was an Australian historical reality TV series that originally aired on ABC TV in 2005. The series was based on several series produced by Channel 4 in the United Kingdom and PBS in the United States, in which the concept was to have a modern-day family living in a facsimile of an historical dwelling with their staff, making do with only the technology and materials of the time. Outback House was set in 1861 Outback Australia, on a sheep station called Oxley Downs in New South Wales.

At the ARIA Music Awards of 2005 the soundtrack was nominated for Best Original Soundtrack, Cast or Show Album.

== Production ==
The series was conceived as an Australian version of the successful House series, produced by Channel 4 in the United Kingdom, and later adapted by American public broadcaster PBS. The series produced by 2005 were The 1900 House (UK, 1999), The Edwardian Country House (UK, 2002), Frontier House (US, 2002) and Colonial House (US, 2004).

The Australian Broadcasting Corporation advertised for twenty people to participate in the series filming for three months, portraying the inhabitants of an 1860s Australian sheep station. Over 5000 people applied to take the journey back in time. In the recreated world of the series, the family running the station were "squatters", who had taken over an abandoned property. In addition, the participants included the considerable number of staff required on an outback sheep farm: overseers, shepherds, governesses, station hands, cooks and maids.

The "Oxley Downs" sheep station was constructed from scratch at a secret location in western New South Wales (later revealed to be just outside Dubbo), because the producers could not find an existing property in authentic condition. The year 1861 was chosen as the setting for the series, as Australia's land ownership laws were about to change dramatically making the incentive to turn a profit even higher, especially given squatters had to fend off challengers for their land if they were not making money on the property. One of the show's producers mentioned on an ABC message board that the location had three requirements: it had to be big; it had to be distinctively Australian in appearance; and it had to be secluded to allow the filming to be conducted in secret. In an attempt to keep the historical bubble from bursting the executive producer banned the production crew from wearing clothes with signage, perfume or aftershave on the sheep station. While filming on the station the small production team used a horse and cart as their crew vehicle. After filming was completed, the Oxley Downs property was retained as a tourist attraction.

== Cast ==
=== The squatters ===
- Paul Allcorn
- Julianne Allcorn
- Persephone, Pierette and Portia Allcorn

=== The overseer families ===
- Glen and Kim Sheluchin
- Peter and Luisa Gordon

=== The shepherds ===
- Bernie Kennedy
- Dan Hatch

=== The governesses ===
- Genevieve Yates
- Fiona Schubert

=== The station hands ===
- Mal Burns
- Adam Carter
- Russell Wulf

=== The cooks ===
- Carolina Francese
- Brigid Dwyer

=== The maids ===
- Claire Williams
- Danielle Schaefer
