= Regency House Party =

- Genre: Historical reenactment reality television
- Narrated by: Richard E. Grant
- Country of origin: United Kingdom
- No. of seasons: 1
- No. of episodes: 8 (4 in the US version)

Production
- Running time: 50 min.
- Production company: Wall to Wall Media

Original release
- Network: Channel 4
- Release: February 14 – March 28, 2004

Regency House Party is a historical reenactment reality television program made by Wall to Wall/Channel 4 in 2004. Narrated by Richard E. Grant, the Regency reenactment is the fourth in a series of historical reality programs produced by Channel 4, preceded by The 1900 House, The 1940s House, and The Edwardian Country House.

The series has a group of unmarried men and women, accompanied by their older female chaperones, assuming the identities of Regency-era individuals from the year 1811. Participants received instruction in the upper class courtship rituals of the time and were charged with seeking out a suitable marriage within the group.

The assigned identities range from titled aristocracy and other wealthy members of society to middle class social climbers. One woman is assigned the role of the ladies' assistant and is thus excluded, according to the conventions of the times, from many of the social activities in the house.

The series was filmed at Kentchurch Court, a grade I listed stately home in Herefordshire, England. Many of the costumes had previously been used in the then-recent adaptations of Pride and Prejudice, Sense and Sensibility, Emma and Vanity Fair.

== Cast ==
Men

- Mr. Chris Gorell Barnes - advertising producer who is given the role of Host and Master of Kentchurch Court.
- Mr. John Everett - stage manager who is given the role of a wealthy businessman, the second highest ranking male in the house.
- "Captain" Jeremy Glover - former dotcom millionaire who is given the role of a Regency naval captain and initially the third highest ranking male. Glover is a descendant of Henry Blackwood who in 1811 was a naval captain and was made a baronet during the Regency. During the series "Captain" Glover is awarded a large sum of money for capturing a prize of war and attains a baronetcy. With wealth and title "Sir Jeremy" becomes the highest ranking male.
- "Captain" Paul Robinson - celebrity hair dresser who given the role of gentleman soldier who has purchased his commission, the fourth highest ranking male. He left half way through the series as he felt he did not fit in.
- Mr. Mark Foxsmith - a high school science teacher who is given the role of a clergyman, the lowest ranking male. He fell in love with Lady Devonport, 25 years his senior, and they continued a relationship after the series.

Women

- Countess Larushka Ivan-Zadeh Griaznov - a barmaid who holds the title Countess Griaznov from Russian nobility (but does not use it in real life) is the highest ranking female. She is given the role of a Russian countess who is now penniless.
- Miss Victoria Hopkins - a rich sales and marketing executive who is given the role of a rich industrial heiress, the second highest female ranking.
- Miss Lisa Braund - a receptionist who is given the role of the daughter of an impoverished aristocrat, the third ranked female.
- Miss Hayley Conick - trainee headhunter who is given the role of the daughter of gentleman with no financial means but with "other talents", the fourth ranked female.
- Miss Francesca Martin - given the lowest rank of the eligible females, lady's companion to Mrs Rogers.

Chaperones

- Mrs Fiona Rogers - former society model who is given the role as the House Hostess and chaperone of the Countess.
- Lady Elizabeth Devonport - real-life aristocrat, the chaperone of Miss Hopkins. She fell in love with Mark Foxsmith and they continued a relationship after the series.
- Mrs Rosie Hammond - self-made millionaire, the chaperone of Miss Braund.
- Mrs Rosemary Enright - former military officer and romantic novelist, the chaperone of Miss Conick.

Guests

- Miss Tanya Samuel - a television producer playing the role of a wealthy West Indian heiress and abolitionist. The highest ranking female guest.
- Kim Newman, an author invited to give the party guests a Gothic horror experience.
- James Carrington, a musician playing the role of a gentleman musician and Dilettanti.
- Simon Armitage, the Poet Laureate playing the role of a Byronesque poet.
- Austin Howard], a singer playing the role of a gentleman musician, poet and dandy.
- Dr Kevin Ilsely, a doctor with an interest in historical medical practices playing the role of a gentleman physician.
- Dr Gunther von Hagens, a German anatomist invited to give a lecture on contemporary natural science using anatomical exhibits.
- Tom Fortes Mayer, a hypnotherapist invited to demonstrate mesmerism.
- Professor Andrew Roberts, a military historian invited to give a lecture on the Battle of Waterloo.
- Lord Temple-Morris, a Peer of the realm invited as a dinner guest.

Advisors and staff

- Zebedee Helm, an artist employed by the estate as a garden hermit.
- Professor Peter Radford, a former athlete and professor of sports science hired to train the male guests in pedestrianism.
- Tim Dean, a boxer hired as a fitness trainer for the male guests, later taking part in a prize fight.
- Nicholas Foulkes, a fashion, grooming and culture author invited to advise the male guests on dressing like a dandy.
- Matt Skelton, the then British heavyweight boxing champion who is hired for bare-knuckle boxing fight (which in Regency times was illegal).
