= The People of the Abyss =

1903 book by Jack London

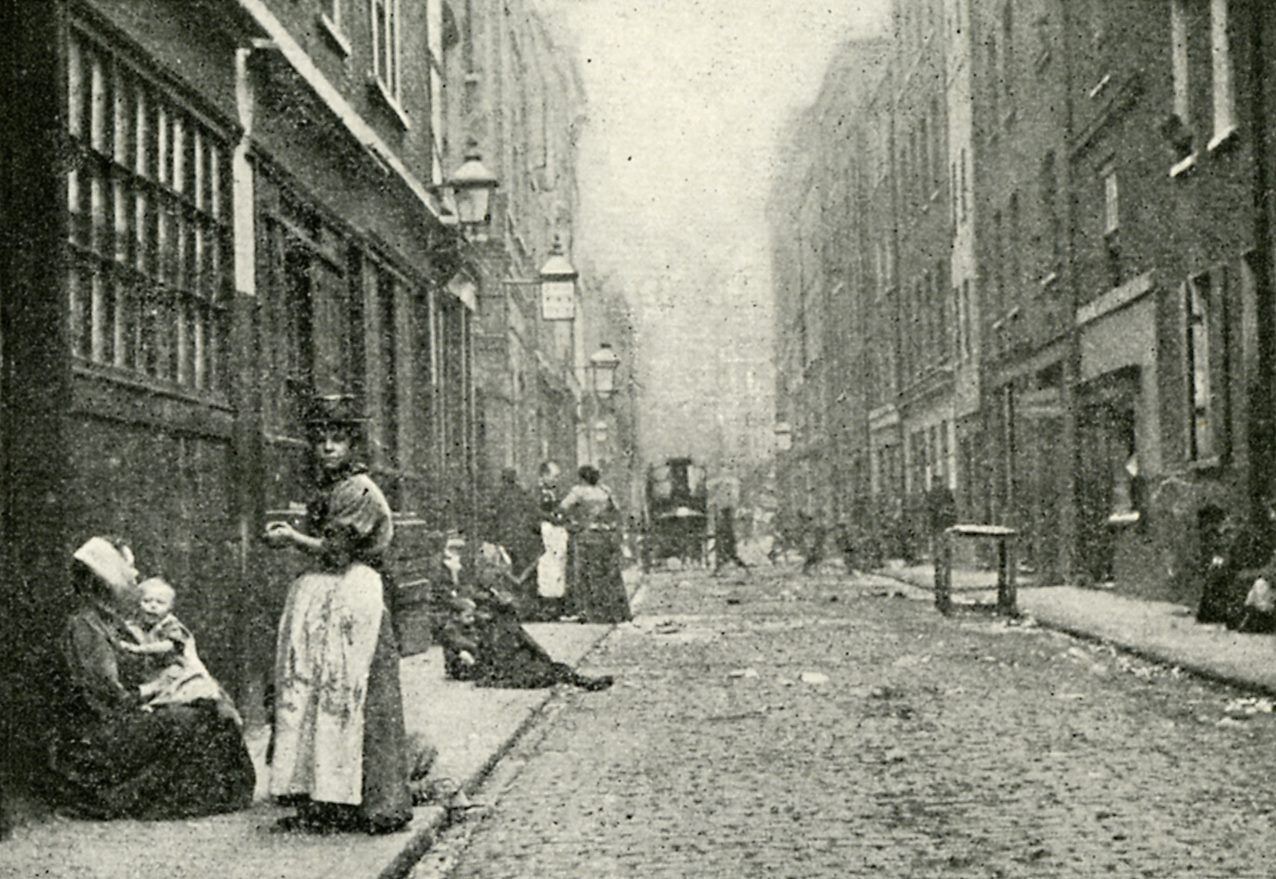
Dorset Street in London's notorious Whitechapel district, photographed in 1902 for The People of the Abyss

The People of the Abyss is a 1903 book by Jack London, containing his first-hand account of several weeks spent living in the Whitechapel district of the East End of London in 1902. London attempted to understand the working-class of this deprived area of the city, sleeping in workhouses or on the streets, and staying as a lodger with a poor family.

== Antecedents and legacy ==
There had been several previous accounts of slum conditions in England, notably The Condition of the Working Class in England (1845) by Friedrich Engels. Most had been based on secondhand sources, unlike London's personal account. A contemporary advertisement for the book compared it to Jacob Riis's sensational How the Other Half Lives (1890), which had documented life in the slums of New York City in the 1880s.

George Orwell was inspired by The People of the Abyss, which he had read in his teens. In the 1930s, he began disguising himself as a derelict and made tramping expeditions into the poor section of London. The influence of The People of the Abyss can be seen in Down and Out in Paris and London and The Road to Wigan Pier.

Reviewing the book for the Daily Express, journalist and editor Bertram Fletcher Robinson wrote that it would be "difficult to find a more depressing volume".

== Phraseology ==
When London wrote the book, the phrase "the Abyss", with its connotation of Hell, was in wide use to refer to the life of the urban poor. It featured in H. G. Wells's popular 1901 book Anticipations multiple times, along with the phrase "the People of the Abyss", which he would use again in Chapter 3 of Mankind in the Making (1903). In 1907 London used the expression "the people of the abyss" in The Iron Heel, a work of dystopian science fiction set in the United States.

== See also ==
- Victorian Slum House, a BBC series about a modern recreation of a slum tenement and its inhabitants in the East End of London
