= Trust Me (British TV series) =

- Genre: Medical drama
- Created by: Dan Sefton
- Written by: Dan Sefton
- Directed by: John Alexander; Amy Neil
- Starring: Jodie Whittaker (Series 1); Alfred Enoch (Series 2)
- Composer: Ben Onono
- Country of origin: United Kingdom
- Original language: English
- No. of series: 2
- No. of episodes: 8

Production
- Executive producers: Gaynor Holmes; Nicola Shindler
- Producer: Emily Feller
- Cinematography: John Conroy; Kate Reid
- Running time: 55 minutes
- Production company: Red Production Company

Original release
- Network: BBC One
- Release: 8 August 2017 – 7 May 2019

Trust Me is a British anthology medical drama that premiered on BBC One. The four-part first series aired in August 2017, and was created by Dan Sefton. In February 2018, the programme was renewed for a second series, which premiered on 16 April 2019. The series was cancelled in June 2019.

The protagonist of the first series is a hardworking divorced ward sister, Cath Hardacre (Jodie Whittaker), who loses her job following whistle blowing, and steals the identity of a doctor, her best friend, to make a new life in Edinburgh with her daughter.

In the second series, Syrian tour veteran Corporal James 'Jamie' McCain (Alfred Enoch) recovers from spinal injuries and psychological trauma in the neurological unit of South Lothian Hospital whilst facing a potential new enemy as patients unexpectedly die around him.

== Cast ==
=== Series One ===
- Jodie Whittaker as Cath Hardacre / Alison 'Ally' Sutton
- Emun Elliott as Dr. Andy Brenner
- Sharon Small as Dr. Brigitte Rayne
- Blake Harrison as Karl, Cath's ex-husband
- Nathan Welsh as Sam Kelly, a journalist
- Cara Kelly as Mona McBride
- Lois Chimimba as Nurse Karen
- Michael Abubakar as Dr. Charlie McKee
- Andrea Lowe as Dr. Alison Sutton
- Duncan Pow as Rob Beasley

=== Series Two ===
- Alfred Enoch as Jamie McCain
- Katie Clarkson-Hill as Dr. Zoe Wade
- John Hannah as Dr. Archie Watson
- Ashley Jensen as Debbie Dorrell
- Richard Rankin as Dr. Alex Kiernan

== Production ==
On 23 February 2018, it was announced that Trust Me would return for a second series, featuring a new premise and an entirely new cast owing to Jodie Whittaker's casting as the Thirteenth Doctor in Doctor Who. The second series was set on the neurological unit of South Lothian Hospital, following Syrian tour veteran Corporal James 'Jamie' McCain as he recovers from spinal injuries and psychological trauma whilst facing a potential new enemy as patients unexpectedly die around him. The second series premiered on 16 April 2019. On 27 June 2019, the BBC confirmed that Trust Me had been cancelled.

== Episodes ==
=== Series 1 (2017) ===
No.	Title	Directed by	Written by	Original release date	UK viewers (millions)
1	Episode 1	John Alexander	Dan Sefton	8 August 2017	7.63
Sheffield nurse and single mother Cath Hardacre loses her job after raising concerns about patient neglect. She assumes the identity of her friend Alison Sutton and seeks a job as an A&E doctor in Edinburgh.
2	Episode 2	John Alexander	Dan Sefton	15 August 2017	7.09
Cath becomes close to colleague Andy Brenner. Her secret is threatened due to factors such as her need for a passport under her new name or Andy meeting with a former classmate of the real Alison.
3	Episode 3	Amy Neil	Dan Sefton	22 August 2017	6.88
Andy deals with what he's learned. Cath and Brigitte are involved in a serious incident at work.
4	Episode 4	Amy Neil	Dan Sefton	29 August 2017	6.91
Cath's personal and professional lives start to fall apart as Cath’s ex-husband Karl arrives in Edinburgh.

=== Series 2 (2019) ===
No.	Title	Directed by	Written by	Original release date	UK viewers (millions)
1	Episode 1	John Alexander	Dan Sefton	16 April 2019	N/A (<4.15) (Note: Not reported in the weekly top 15 programmes for four-screen viewer ratings.)
Corporal Jamie McCain is paralysed from a spinal injury. Patients in his hospital ward start dying, and he attempts to investigate the suspicious deaths.
2	Episode 2	John Alexander	Dan Sefton	23 April 2019	N/A (<3.93)
3	Episode 3	John Alexander	Dan Sefton	30 April 2019	N/A (<3.67)
4	Episode 4	John Alexander	Dan Sefton	7 May 2019	N/A (<3.67)
