= Hugh Edgar =

English architect

Hugh Edgar is an English architect who worked on several archival projects in the United Kingdom and as a consultant around the world. He completed the design for the National Museum of Antiquities for Scotland. He was the RIBA representative to the British Standards Institute about BS 5454:2000 "Recommendations for storage and exhibition of archival documents." He was also commissioned by the royal family of Jordan. Edgar achieved renown as one of the participants in the television series The Edwardian Country House, in which he portrayed the butler.
