= The 1900 Island =

2019 Welsh television series

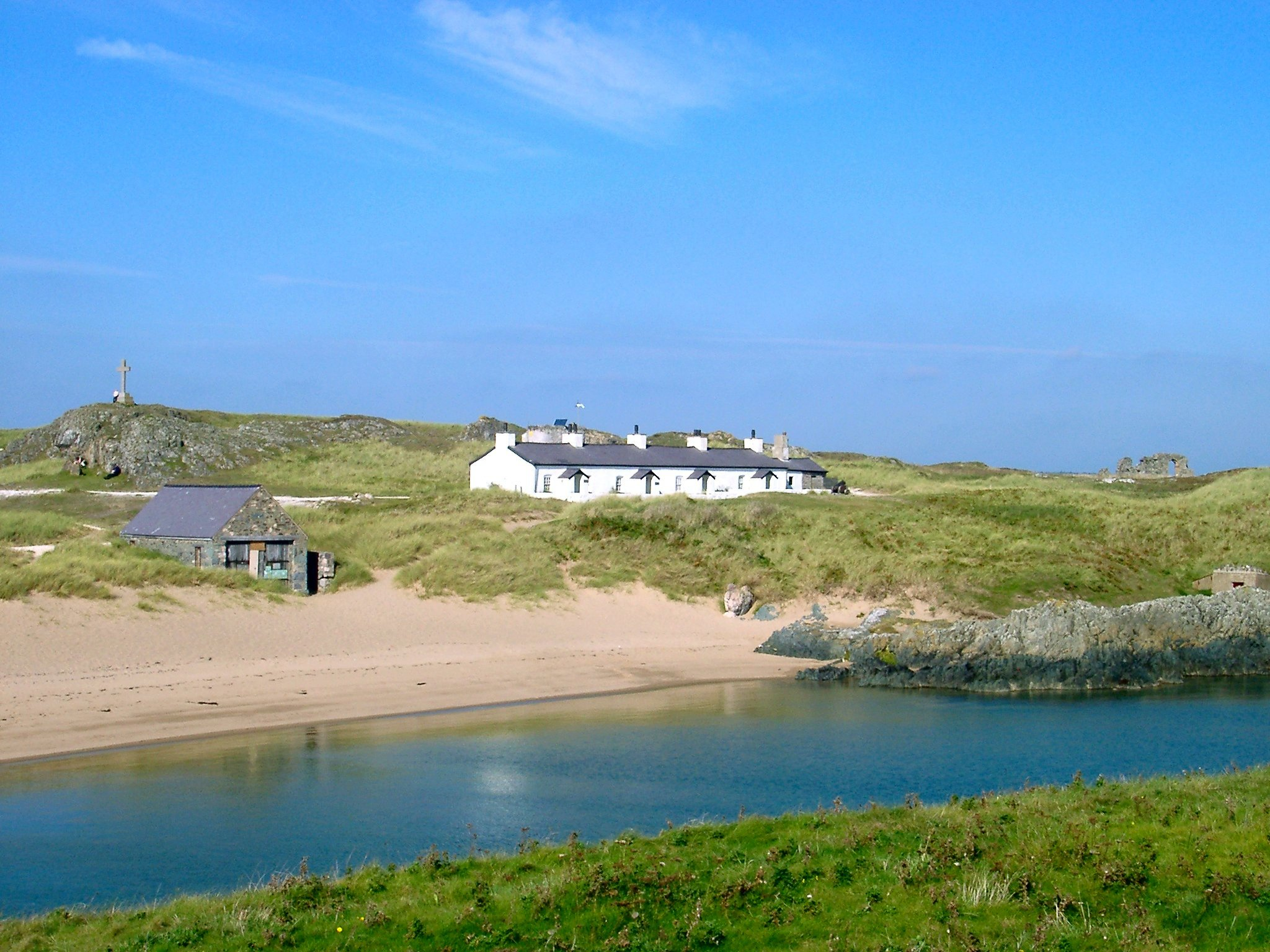
- The Pilots Cottages, Llanddwyn, the families' homes for the series
- Created by: Wildflame Productions
- Country of origin: Wales
- No. of series: 1
- No. of episodes: 4

Production
- Running time: 60mins

Original release
- Network: BBC One Wales
- Release: 2 May 2019

The 1900 Island is a Welsh television series produced by Wildflame Productions, made for BBC Wales and first broadcast on BBC One Wales from 2 May 2019, with a subsequent UK wide broadcast on BBC Two from 10 June 2019. The series was filmed on the island of Llanddwyn, Anglesey, Wales, recreating the life of a fishing village at the turn of the 20th century.

== Plot ==
The series follows four 21st-century families who are placed in a recreation of a 1900 Welsh fishing village. The families live in a row of original pilots' cottages on Llanddwyn, taking on the traditional male and female roles and using the original facilities and technology of the times. The men go out to sea to catch fish (when weather permits) while the women stay on the island to look after the children and manage their homes. They start with only a few chickens and basic rations of food. Lydia Power ran a small shop selling provisions.

In Episode 1, the men are unable to fish because of several days of stormy weather and Clive, suffering from gout, is unable to work at all. The women go out to find shellfish on the beach. The men are finally able to spend their first day at sea, they return home and Clive uses his skills to gut and prepare some dogfish to eat.

In Episode 2, the children spend their first day at school. A cargo ship arrives in the bay, providing some additional work for the men unloading the goods. The men and women are joined by the ship's crew in the tavern to celebrate their work. A Spanish sailor, Yannick, decides to stay on the island and lodges with the Barkers.

In Episode 3, the men go on a 3-day fishing trip in a larger boat, fishing using nets. Before they leave, they put lobster pots out in the bay. The Davies family are facing hunger trying to feed their large family, so Lydia organises a charity food hamper from the other villagers. In the men's absence Kate rows out to check the lobster pots.

In Episode 4, a steam powered fishing vessel arrives in the bay, threatening the village's livelihood. The women gut and prepare the large catch of fish from the men's fishing trip, but prices have fallen and they make much less than they hoped. Both the men and women go searching for cockles and mussels, which fetch better prices. Ruby is taught how to use a sewing machine, though is unhappy about her lack of prospects as a young woman. Arwel and Kate, being child-free and more mobile, decide to leave the island to find alternative work. The cockle and mussel catch fetches a handsome sum. The villagers celebrate their final night, in the tavern.

== Setting ==
The series is filmed mostly on the 0.3 km^{2} (0.12 sq mi) tidal island of Llanddwyn on the rugged coastline of southwest Anglesey. Four original pilots' cottages, previously uninhabited for 70 years, were fitted out with early 20th-century furnishings. A contemporary pub and school were also recreated. The island has a large beach facing the Irish Sea. The island is also known for its lighthouse and the ruined church of St Dwynwen.

== Participants ==
Four families, each occupying one of the cottages, took part in the series:

- The Powers, a Welsh-speaking family from Cardiff. Parents Lydia (40) and Gareth Power (36) took part with their three young children, Phebe (8), Dafydd (6) and Gruffydd (3).
- Arwel John (34) and Kate Evans (38), a couple from Swansea. Arwel was a blacksmith who had previously lived off-grid for several years.
- Gavin (40) and Natalie Davies (39) came from the Wirral near Liverpool, with their five children Ruby (15), Lily (13), Jude, Evan and Arlo.
- Retired fisherman Clive Barker (70) and his wife Cheryl (68) came from Kent, England.

In addition, Yannick, a computer science student portraying a Spanish sailor, begins lodging with the Barkers from episode 2. A professional sailor, Stuart Gibson, captained the traditional sailing boat. Professional fisherman, Mickey Beechey from Llangrannog, teaches the men how to catch fish. A fishmonger, Mike Heard from Caernarfon, buys the villagers' catch. A shipwright working in a shed on the island offers the men additional work.

A total cast of thirty people took part.

== Production ==
The series was filmed in mid 2018. It took a total of 15 months to set up, film and edit. 21 expert advisors were used, as well as four small camera teams. A production office was set up in the island's lighthouse.

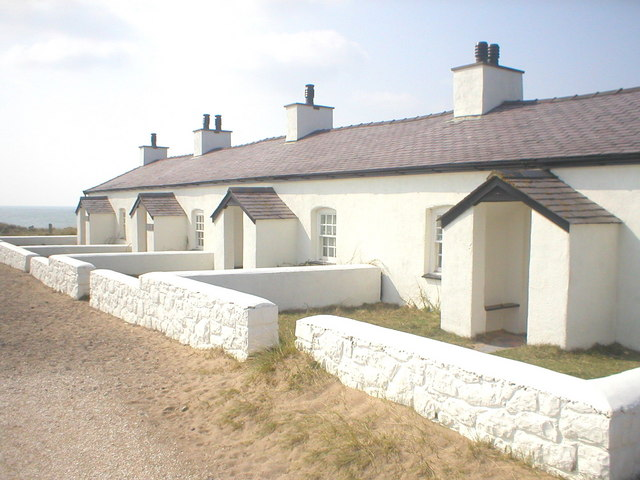
The four pilots' cottages

The Grade II listed cottages were restored and fitted with authentic Edwardian stoves and furniture. Contemporary diets and lifestyles were researched from oral histories, photographs and letters. The participants wore authentic clothing using traditional materials. Original fishing boats and equipment were also found.

The families lived on the island 24 hours a day. The production company, Wildflame Productions, set out to make an observational documentary of events as they naturally developed, rather than set up pre-planned stories.

== Publications ==
In October 2019, participant Natalie Davies published a children's book called Mickey the Fisherman – Pollution based on Welsh fisherman Mickey Beechey and her experiences on the island.

== See also ==
- The 1900 House
- Coal House
