= United States School Garden Army =

School Garden Army recruitment poster by Edward Penfield (1918)

The United States School Garden Army (USSGA), was founded by the Bureau of Education in 1917 during the administration of President Woodrow Wilson's. Wilson described gardening as "just as real and patriotic an effort as the building of ships or the firing of cannon" and opined that "food will win the war". The USSGA was set up to encourage gardening among school children, in the hopes of preventing a potential food scarcity after World War I. Funding for the entity comes from the War Department.

The Bureau of Education distributed manuals and guides (featuring data on soil health) across the nation to children ages 9–15 and their teachers. By Armistice Day, a large number of American children had answered the call to become "Soldiers of the Soil". War Gardens are now known as Victory Gardens.
