= Finders Keepers (2024 British TV series) =

2024 British television drama series

- Genre: Drama
- Created by: Dan Sefton
- Written by: Dan Sefton
- Directed by: Philip John
- Starring: Neil Morrissey; James Buckley; Fay Ripley; Jessica Rhodes
- Country of origin: United Kingdom
- Original language: English
- No. of series: 1
- No. of episodes: 4

Production
- Executive producers: Nicola Shindler; Davina Earl; Dan Sefton
- Producer: Simon Lupton
- Production companies: Quay Street Productions; Seven Seas Films

Original release
- Network: Channel 5
- Release: 17 January – 7 February 2024

Finders Keepers is a 2024 British four-part television drama series, directed by Philip John and written by Dan Sefton. It stars Neil Morrissey and James Buckley, with Fay Ripley and Jessica Rhodes. It was broadcast in the United Kingdom on Channel 5 from 17 January to 7 February 2024.

== Premise ==
Amateur metal detectorists in Somerset discover a hoard of buried Saxon treasure, which they think might be very valuable. Rather than submitting the find to the authorities as they are legally obliged, but risk diluting their profit with the land owner, they have the choice of keeping the discovery secret and selling it themselves.

== Cast ==
- Neil Morrissey as Martin Stone
- James Buckley as Ashley Taylor
- Fay Ripley as Anne Stone
- Jessica Rhodes as Laura Stone
- Rakhee Thakrar as DS Carole Doyle
- Shane Attwooll as Greg ‘Rocky’ Rock
- Brendan Coyle as Denys Elland
- Herbert Forthuber as Gregorie Lechamps

== Production ==
In April 2023, the four-part series was commissioned under the title The Hoard with production by Quay Street Productions and Seven Seas Films. Simon Lupton is series producer with Nicola Shindler and Davina Earl as executive producers. Philip John is the director from a Dan Sefton script, who is also an executive producer.

Set in Somerset, filming locations in the county included Glastonbury Market Place and Glastonbury High Street, as well as Glastonbury Tor. Filming also took place in Buckinghamshire.

== Broadcast ==
The series was broadcast in the United Kingdom on Channel 5 from 17 January 2024.

== Reception ==
Anita Singh in The Daily Telegraph said it was "well made… Morrissey is perfectly cast". Carol Midgely in The Times awarded it three stars and said it was "a decent watch" and that "Morrissey’s performance was admirably restrained".
