= Frontier House =

2002 American reality television series

- Genre: Historical reality television
- Country of origin: United States
- No. of seasons: 1
- No. of episodes: 6

Production
- Running time: 60 min.

Original release
- Network: PBS
- Release: April 29 – May 1, 2002

Frontier House is a historical reality television series that originally aired on the Public Broadcasting Service (PBS) in the United States from April 29 to May 3, 2002. The series followed three family groups that agreed to live as homesteaders did in Montana Territory on the American frontier in 1883. Each family was expected to establish a homestead and complete the tasks necessary to prepare for the harsh Montana winter. At the end of the series, each family was judged by a panel of experts and historians on their likelihood of survival.

== Cast ==
Three families were chosen to be on the show:

- The Clunes – The Clune family consisted of Gordon (age 40), his wife Adrienne (age 39), their daughter Aine (age 14), son Justin (age 12), son Conor (age 8), and Gordon's niece, Tracy (age 15). Gordon owned an aerospace and defense manufacturing firm, and the family was very well-off financially. Adrienne was born and raised in County Wicklow, Ireland. Gordon Clune said that his family was best suited for the show because they had dinner together every night, conversed well, Adrienne was an excellent cook, and Gordon and the boys enjoyed hiking and were good marksmen.
- The Glenns – The Glenn family consisted of stepfather Mark (age 45), wife Karen (age 36), daughter Erinn Patton (age 12), and son Logan Patton (age 8). Mark Glenn was the chair of the department of medical and pharmacy technology at Draughons Junior College in Nashville, Tennessee. Karen was a school nurse, and she pushed her family to apply for the show because her father grew up in a log cabin in Maryland. Karen Glenn said her family was best-suited for the show because they worked well together as a team to solve problems.
- The Brookses – The Brooks family consisted of student activities coordinator Nate Brooks (age 27), his social worker fiancée Kristen McLeod (age 27), and Nate's father, Rudy Brooks (age 68). Rudy was not originally part of the applicant family. He was brought in on the show only at the last moment, leaving his wife behind in Massachusetts. Kristen joined Nate and Rudy in the third episode of the show, at which point Nate and Kristen were married and Rudy left. Nate Brooks said that they were best suited for the show because of their communication skills, faith, courage, resourcefulness, creativity, and patience.

== Production ==
The success of The 1900 House (which aired in 1999) and The 1940s House (which aired in 2001) inspired PBS to commission a similar historical reality television series set in the United States.

The budget for the series was $4.1 million, which included $3.3 million for the production itself and $800,000 for promotion and the website. Most of the funding came from PBS, the Corporation for Public Broadcasting, the Alfred P. Sloan Foundation, and British public service broadcaster Channel 4.

=== Casting ===
More than 5,500 families applied to be on the show.

=== Preparation ===
The participants spent two weeks in classrooms and kitchens, learning about the history of the period and gaining expertise in animal husbandry, carpentry, chopping wood, clothes washing, cooking, farming, gardening, harvesting skills, personal hygiene (without the use of toilet paper), sewing, soap making, and other skills which the average person in 1880s Montana would have known. The participants spent their days learning skills in Virginia City, Montana—a restored ghost town, open-air museum, and National Historic Landmark. To reduce culture shock, the participants were permitted to sleep in a modern hotel and enjoy modern activities (like television and bowling) at night.

Participants agreed to abide by a set of rules, which included the following:

- Wearing period-appropriate clothing.
- Preparing and eating period-appropriate food.
- Using period-appropriate equipment, and using it in period-appropriate ways.
- Communicating with the outside world (including series consultants) only through the postal service at the remote country store, or via telegraph.
- Buying initial goods and supplies based on a period-appropriate budget set by series consultants, and then using the barter system during occasional visits to the country store.
- Using only period-appropriate medicines. (For a serious medical emergency, participants could talk to a member of the production staff and seek the assistance of the show's physician.)

Anyone was free to leave the show at any time, although participants were asked to consult the production team first and record the decision on the video diary.

In preparation for leaving for the homestead site, participants were allowed to purchase whatever items their budget could afford—so long as it could fit into the single horse-drawn covered wagon provided to each family for hauling goods. The wagons were, in fact, quite small and held few goods. Each family packed and repacked their wagons repeatedly to get more goods into them.

Departure for the homesteading site, where the three families would live for five months, occurred on May 21, 2001.

=== Production notes ===
The three families were on site from June to October 2001. Filming ended on October 5, 2001. More than 500 hours of footage were shot.

Dissent was a common occurrence on the series. Karen and Mark Glenn were shown repeatedly attacking one another verbally. Rob Owen, writing for the Pittsburgh Post-Gazette, noted that the Glenn marriage "begins to disintegrate as holier-than-thou Karen harshly harps on Mark for everything and anything. Karen comes off as gleefully despotic and her behavior sometimes makes Frontier House painful to watch, especially when you consider how her children are affected." David Zurawik of the Baltimore Sun questioned why the show focused so much on the Glenns' marital problems. "Is [the series] about seeing a strained marriage crack up with a husband calling his wife 'Hitler,' while she mocks him for 'whining' constantly?" The Clune family, too, was singled out for constantly complaining. Viewers of the show routinely attacked the Clunes for being "the overprivileged Black Hats" of the series. Gordon Clune and Karen Glenn also clearly disliked one another. Gordon Clune accused the producers of goading Karen Glenn to anger by telling her about critical things that the Clunes said about her, and vice versa. But the producers denied that. A reviewer from the Baltimore Sun, however, said it was apparent that the producers edited the series to make the conflict appear worse than it was.

The Clune family was caught cheating on several occasions. They secretly put a box spring mattress beneath their bed, sneaked off the homestead to sell baked goods, stole fish from a neighbor's lake, and smuggled in shampoo, soap, and cosmetics. Due to state hunting laws and regulations, and based on the opinion of the production's safety experts, none of the homesteaders were permitted to hunt for game. Gordon Clune voiced his intense dissatisfaction with this rule repeatedly during the production. Clune and some of the other men on the show stole video cameras from the production crew and "hunted" deer with them in an attempt to prove that they could have shot the animals. Clune and the other men asked for meat to be given to them, but the producers denied their request.

Competition among all three families was intense. The producers later said that the decision to have the homesteaders prepare to survive a Montana winter led to this competition, which was a regrettable and unintended side-effect.

During production of the series, the September 11 attacks on the World Trade Center in New York City, and on the Pentagon in Washington D.C., occurred. The producers discussed whether they should tell the participants and decided it was appropriate to do so. Local newspapers from nearby towns were given to the participants to read so that they could learn about the attacks. The participants were permitted to read the newspapers for several days in a row to stay abreast of what happened. Nearly all the homesteaders expressed their satisfaction with the way the situation was handled, and appreciated being isolated again. Kristen Brooks was not happy at the time with this decision. She said she was convinced that the production should have shut down for a few days to permit the participants to learn more and to determine if any friends had died in the Twin Towers disasters.

=== The site of the homesteads ===
Filming of Frontier House occurred in an undisclosed valley on a ranch approximately 25 miles (40 km) south of Big Timber, Montana, owned by Ken Davenport. The Montana Film Office spent weeks trying to locate an appropriate site for the production. The site had to be isolated and only rarely overflown by aircraft, but also had to be accessible via automobile. The area had to be viable for agriculture as well. This turned out to be a problem, as many of the sites investigated had such poor topsoil that they could not be used.

The Davenport ranch was a historic one. The Crow Nation had originally been given the area as a reservation, but they ceded it back to the United States in 1882 in favor of a larger parcel of land to the east. This historic fact would lead the series producers to hire Dale Old Horn, Crow tribal historian, as a consultant on the show (he would also appear on-camera) and to have Crow hunters arrive to help feed the participants.

Each family was given an 160-acre (0.65 km^{2}) plot of land to farm, graze animals on, and build a home on. All three "homesteads" had easy access to a creek, and were within a 15-minute walk of one another. The country store run by the fictional Hop Sing Yim (played by local Montana historian Ying-Ming Lee) was 10 miles (16 km) away, and required hiking on foot over two mountain passes.

The production crew numbered 15 individuals, broken into two units. The team included two directors, each of whom was responsible for three of the series' six episodes. Only one production unit was used to film most events in the series, although during major events (such as a visit to the country store, a visit by Crow Indians, or the wedding) both production units would be filming. Initially, whichever production unit that was filming lived in tipis and filmed every day. (The "resting" production crew stayed in a small town about 75 minutes away.) These production unit living quarters were about 5 miles (8.0 km) away. But in time, both production crews moved into town, and filming occurred only about every three to four days.

The production team learned that it was common for homesteaders in Montana in the 1880s to find abandoned cabins, and to live in them while building better housing. To recreate this experience, the production team built a cabin for the Glenn family. This cabin was based on historic plans for a miner's cabin which the team had discovered in library archives. A partially built cabin (mimicking a cabin which had been abandoned and fallen into disrepair) was provided to the Clune family, while the Brooks family had to build their cabin from scratch. It took Nate and Rudy Brooks six weeks to build their cabin. During that time, they slept in tents and suffered through several weeks of below-freezing temperatures at night. It also snowed and rained for several days during this time. The Glenns invited the Clunes into their cabin, but the Clunes declined.

== Episodes ==
1. "The American Dream" — The families are shown arriving in Virginia City and learning about frontier life in 1883 Montana. The narration discusses a number of critical issues facing the families, the history of homesteading and Montana, and various survival skills. The Glenns' milk cow falls ill. The families adopt their period dress, pack their wagons, and begin their three-day journey to the homestead site. When the horses leading one of the wagons bolt, Adrienne is nearly trampled and Conor is thrown to the ground. Conor is bitten by the Glenn's dog.
2. "Promised Land" — The families arrive in "Frontier Valley" and settle on their homesteads. Experts assist the families with the most dangerous tasks (like felling trees). Gordon Clune and Mark Glenn help the Brooks build their cabin. The weather turns rainy, the Glenn's dog eats some of the Clune's food, and the Clune girls confess to having snuck makeup onto the show. Gordon complains about the 21st century restrictions placed on him (such as no hunting), the poor quality of the goods given to the family, and the lack of preparation by the historical consultants. The Clunes struggle to get into their routine, and construction of the Brooks cabin is slower than anyone anticipated. The Clunes worry about how little food the family has. Crow Indians visit the homesteaders, providing deer meat for them. All the families have trouble breaking sod. The Glenns purchase a second milk cow. A freak snowstorm dumps 9 inches (23 cm) of snow on the homesteaders. The Clune's milk cow runs off.
3. "Til Death Do Us Part" — Nate Brooks anticipates the arrival of Kristen. The hard work takes a toll on everyone, forcing Karen Glenn to ask for a modern doctor due to tendonitis. The Clunes worry again about how little food they have to eat. As the end of June nears, the homesteaders visit the country store. Mark Glenn builds a porch for his wife's birthday. Nate's brother Alan arrives to help finish the cabin, and the Glenns' marriage begins to show strains. Tracy Clune suffers intense homesickness, and her parents visit from California. Nate and Kristen's wedding day approaches, leading to extensive preparations. Nate and Kristen's wedding occurs, Rudy Brooks' time on Frontier House comes to an end, and Kristen sees Nate's finished cabin for the first time.
4. "Survival" — The episode begins seven weeks into the experiment, and one week after Nate and Kristen's marriage. Kristen adjusts to frontier life. The Clunes receive the large amount of food they ordered two weeks ago, and decide to sell their horses and foal to the country store to pay for it. The Glenns build a chicken coop, and buy sheep and a pig to raise money. The Brooks, however, decide not to invest in animals. All the families confront having to lay up large amounts of hay for winter. Gordon Clune believes his weight loss is due to illness. The Clune family leaves the homestead and visits the home of a modern neighbor. There, they trade baked goods for meat and other food, watch TV, and the kids play with modern kids. Gordon and Adrienne defend their actions as not violating the rules, but rather trading with neighbors (which is in the spirit of the game). A modern physician determines Gordon is healthy, and the Clunes trade baked foods for Nate's firewood so Gordon does not have to work so hard. The Glenns and Clunes begin to make money from the "butter and egg business," and the Brooks buy milk goats. Gordon receives a still and makes alcohol, earning a substantial income. A neighbor drives cattle across the homesteads, forcing the participants to erect barbed wire fences. The Glenns' marriage erodes further, and Gordon and Karen feud.
5. "A Family Affair" — The ways the adults deal with the lack of privacy is examined. The children discuss how hard they must work, and become upset whenever livestock must be killed. The participants worry about disease, and a bear wanders onto the Clune property. The families decide to build a schoolhouse, and hire a teacher for the children. Not having children around changes the rhythm of life on the homesteads, and the children adapt to learning in a one-room classroom. The relationship between Karen and Gordon further deteriorates, as does the Glenns' marriage. Karen's mother visits from Tennessee for Logan's ninth birthday. The children celebrate the end of five weeks of school by holding a recitation, and the families celebrate with a sewing bee.
6. "The Reckoning" — The episode begins 10 days before the experiment comes to an end. Each family builds a root cellar. The families begin harvesting their vegetables, and plan a harvest fair. The Glenns slaughter their pig, and the Clunes harvest dry grass. The women reflect on the drudgery of women's lives on the frontier, and many of the participants talk about how hard it will be to leave. The participants learn about the 9/11 terrorist attacks. Neighbors from miles around join the harvest fair. The experts convene to assess the families. All the families had too little firewood, and the Clunes had hay that had too little nutritional value. The Clunes are found to have smuggled a modern box-spring into their home. Gordon announces that half his family will spend the winter in Butte, Montana, as a means of survival. A light snow falls on the final day on the site. The families reflect on leaving the homesteads. Two months later, the verdict is revealed. Nate and Kristen Brooks are on an extended honeymoon. They are judged to be able to survive the winter. The Clunes have moved into a large mansion in Malibu, California. They are judged to be unable to survive the winter. The Glenns have returned to Tennessee. They are told that, while they would have been physically able to survive the winter, they were not psychologically ready to do so. The Glenns decide to separate, as their marriage has suffered during their stay on the homestead.

== Broadcast ==
PBS originally intended to broadcast Frontier House in January 2002, but switched the air date to April 29 through May 1. This allowed the network to market Frontier House at the same time as other new series and specials, saving advertising dollars. The decision to air the show against other series on broadcast television networks during the highly popular May sweeps was strongly criticized. The Pittsburgh Post-Gazette, for example, said that this decision meant fewer people watched Frontier House than would have at other times of the year.

The series was re-edited with new commentary and a new narrator. The reworked episodes, still titled Frontier House, were shown on the DIY Network.

== Reception ==
Frontier House was nominated for an Emmy Award for Outstanding Non-Fiction Program (Reality) in 2002. It had also received very high television ratings.

It has been described in an academic review as "a critical, self-reflexive interrogation of romanticized visions of the U.S. nineteenth-century life on the frontier".

== Similar reality series ==
Frontier House was part of the PBS "House" series that began in the UK with The 1900 House in 1999/2000. In the US it was followed in 2004 by Colonial House, which recreated daily life in Plymouth Colony in 1628. In 2006, PBS aired Texas Ranch House, which recreated the life of a family and ranch hands on an 1867 Texas longhorn cattle ranch in Texas.

== Bibliography ==
- McCormick, Betsy. "Back to the Future: Living the Liminal Life in the Manor House and the Medieval Dream." In Cultural Studies of the Modern Middle Ages. Eileen A. Joy, ed. New York: Palgrave Macmillan, 2007.
- Shaw, Simon; Peavy, Linda; and Smith, Ursula. Frontier House. New York: Simon and Schuster, 2002.
