= Victorian Slum House =

British reality television program

Victorian Slum House, or Victorian Slum, is a historical reenactment reality television series made by Wall to Wall Media for the BBC in 2016, narrated by Michael Mosley. First broadcast on BBC in the United Kingdom and on PBS in America in May 2017, the narrative centers on families and individuals trying to survive in a recreated slum of the East End of London from the 1860s to 1900s. It has a similar concept to The 1900 House, as well as the same producer. In Australia, the series aired on SBS in July 2017 as Michael Mosley: Queen Victoria's Slum, to avoid possible confusion with the state of Victoria.

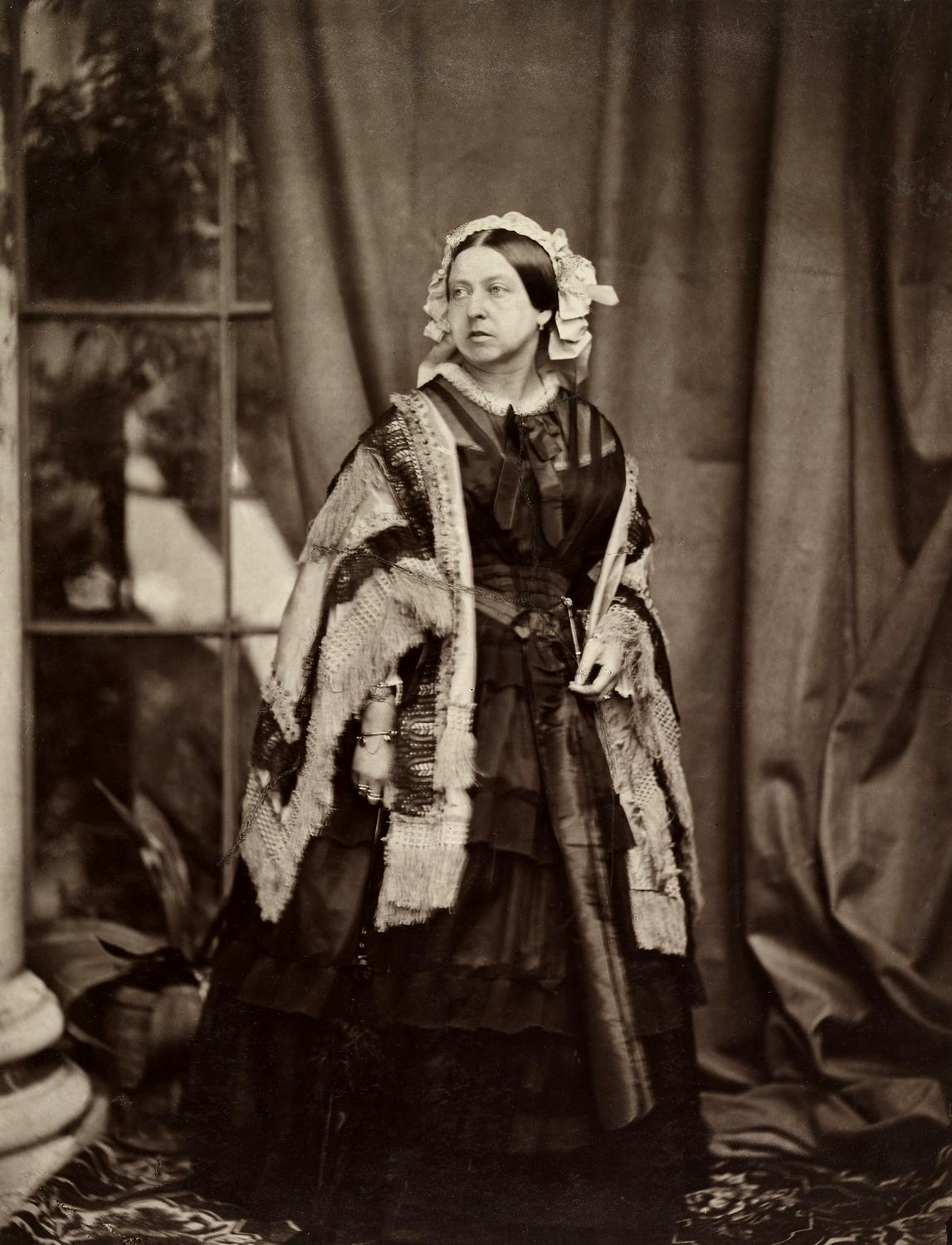
Queen Victoria photographed by J. J. E. Mayall, 1860

== Episodes ==
- Episode 1: The 1860s (premiered 2 May 2017)

The participants, many of whom are interested in learning how their ancestors lived, move into an 1860s tenement containing sparse rooms, a single outdoor water pump and outhouses. The lower floor contains a simulated dosshouse for those who may find they cannot make their rent. They attempt to earn money by doing piece work, selling foods or flowers, woodturning, running a grocery store, or tailoring.

- Episode 2: The 1870s (premiered 9 May 2017)

Irish immigrants arrive, seeking work and depressing the English economy, which is felt by all. Various participants are more successful than others at earning money, and the less skilled must work harder with long hours to try to settle their debts.

Part of Charles Booth's poverty map showing Commercial Road in Whitechapel 1889. The red areas are "well-to-do", and black areas are the "lowest class...occasional labourers, street sellers, loafers, criminals and semi-criminals". The latter regions were targeted for demolition.

- Episode 3: The 1880s (premiered 16 May 2017)

The economy is still bad, but desperate conditions in their own countries continue to force immigrants to London. The participants are horrified to be subjected to gawking inside of their homes by "upper class" visitors paying to being taken through as slum tourists.

- Episode 4: The 1890s (premiered 23 May 2017)

Reform programs being initiated for the poor and their children both help and hinder various residents. The introduction of wide-scale manufacturing also offers hope for a change in fortune. A water shortage impacts the business of one of the residents and makes life harder for the rest.

- Episode 5: The 1900s (premiered 30 May 2017)

The slum house is marked for demolition and the residents consider their follow up options as they prepare to move. The residents reflect on their experiences throughout their time at the slum house and have a feast together, courtesy of King Edward VII.

== Production ==
The structure used to house the participants was the Alice Billings House, near Queen Elizabeth Olympic Park. It was built in 1877 as part of the West Ham fire station as a residence for firemen and their families. The building was so run down that it had to have safety improvements added prior to the film crew dressing it for the series. Three tons of mud were brought into the courtyard to help simulate conditions of the era.

Some modern requirements had to remain in place. Flushing toilets were available (although there were outhouses in the courtyard as there would have been in that setting), and a nutritional baseline was adhered to for the children, although the food provided was typical of the time as much as possible. The participants also did not experience the diseases such as cholera that afflicted people in the slums.

The participants were kept "in character" during their entire stay. The crew did not eat in front of them, and knocked before entering their living quarters. When Mandy Holworth, the tailor's wife, found a hole in her shoe, she approached the crew and they asked her "What would a poor Victorian do?" instead of giving her a replacement set. Her family had two buckets of water - one for rinsing dishes and the other for rinsing their faces and armpits. She said that after the production, the dirt was so embedded under her toenails that it took two weeks to come clean.

== Cognate series ==
Victorian Slum House is one in a line of "time capsule" reality television series that begun with The 1900 House – a modern family reenacts life at the start of the 20th century (aired 1999/2000).

== See also ==
- The People of the Abyss, a book by Jack London detailing his personal experiences while living in the London slums
- The Eliza Armstrong case, involving the purchase of a girl from her mother who needed money, and subsequent exposure of the child sex trade in 1855
- Suffragette
