= The Edwardian Country House =

British historical reenactment reality television miniseries

- DVD/VHS cover under the British title The Edwardian Country House
- Genre: Historical reenactment reality television
- Narrated by: Derek Jacobi
- Countries of origin: United Kingdom; United States
- No. of seasons: 1
- No. of episodes: 6

Production
- Running time: 60 min.

Original release
- Network: Channel 4
- Release: 23 April – 28 May 2002

The Edwardian Country House is a British historical reenactment reality television miniseries produced by Channel 4. First aired weekly in the UK beginning in April 2002, it was later broadcast in the United States on PBS stations as Manor House in 2003, where extra footage was added. It is third in a series of historical reality shows produced by Channel 4, preceded by The 1900 House and The 1940s House.

== Synopsis ==
In the series the Olliff-Cooper family are given the identities of turn-of-the-century aristocrats and housed in Manderston, an opulent Scottish country house, where they live for three months in the Edwardian style. Mr. and Dr Olliff-Cooper become Sir John Olliff-Cooper and Lady Olliff-Cooper.

Interest and conflict is provided by the 15 servants, portrayed by individuals from several paths of life. Chief among these was Hugh Edgar, an architect from Surrey, who was cast in the role of the butler.

Participants received instruction and a set of rules by which they were expected to abide for the duration of the experiment. Most of the "upstairs" participants enjoy their time in the house, which is meant to represent the years 1905–1914. Those "below stairs" have a different experience; for those in the lowest ranks, particularly the successive scullery maids, life appears to be intolerable.

== Development ==
According to Dru Sefton writing for the Current, for the American release, PBS renamed Edwardian Country House "so that Americans wouldn’t wonder who Edward was". The show was also re-edited to focus on the servants the American viewers were expected to find more interesting, like the French chief, and some historical commentary was replaced with more general remarks about British history and society.

== Cast ==
The narrator is Derek Jacobi.

=== Upstairs ===
21st-century life	Edwardian-period life	Role
John Olliff-Cooper	Sir John	Master of the Household
Dr. Anna Olliff-Cooper	Lady Olliff-Cooper	Mistress of the Household
Jonathan (Jonty) Olliff-Cooper	Mister Jonathan	Eldest son of Sir John and Lady Olliff-Cooper
Guy Olliff-Cooper	Master Guy	Youngest son of Sir John and Lady Olliff-Cooper
Prof. Avril Anson	Miss Anson	Lady Olliff-Cooper's sister
Reji Raj	Mr Raj-Singh	Tutor to Master Guy

=== Downstairs ===
==== Senior Staff ====
21st-century life	Edwardian-period life	Role
Hugh Edgar	Mr Edgar	Butler (also valeting Sir John)
Jean Davies	Mrs Davies	Housekeeper
Denis Dubiard	Monsieur Dubiard	Chef de cuisine
Eva Morrison	Miss Morrison	Lady's maid to Lady Olliff-Cooper

==== Junior staff ====
21st-century life	Edwardian-period life	Role
Charlie Clay	Charlie	First footman (also valeting Mr. Jonathan)
Rob Daly	Rob	Second footman and (also valeting Master Guy)
Tristan Aldrich	Tristan	Groom
Ken Skelton	Kenny	Hallboy
Rebecca Smith	Becky	First housemaid
Jessica Rawlinson	Jess	Second housemaid
Erika Ravitz	Erika	Third housemaid
Antonia Dawson	Antonia	Kitchen maid
Kelly Squires	Kelly	Scullery maid
Lucy Garside	Lucy	Scullery maid
Ellen Beard	Ellen	Scullery maid

== Episodes ==
No. overall	No. in series	Title	Original release date
1	1	"Upstairs Downstairs"	23 April 2002
Day one at Manderston and 13 of the volunteers arrive. To help them through the three months ahead of life in the Edwardian era, they have a rule book outlining their roles and positions in the rigid upstairs-downstairs hierarchy. A Hampshire family has been chosen to live as the masters of the house. The nine-year-old son is especially pleased to find he has people to order about. However, not everyone is satisfied. A week in, there is already a situation vacant in the house.
2	2	"Getting up to Scratch"	30 April 2002
At a time when industrial and commercial wealth was only just being accepted into the ranks of high society, it was crucial for a nouveau riche family like the Olliff-Coopers to hold and improve their position at the top. In episode two Sir John and Lady Olliff-Cooper set about using their new assets, including their country house, their male servants and their French chef, to maximum effect in that most powerful social weapon—the dinner party. The family is settling into their new luxurious lifestyle. Lady Olliff-Cooper feels like a child again. Mister Jonathan and Master Guy are learning to talk to people 50 years their senior while 'looking down their noses' and Sir John is wishing modern society was a little more like it is at Manderston. Downstairs there is some jostling for position going on. There is a new scullery maid—Kelly Squire—and she is not enjoying the job much more than her predecessor.
3	3	"The Servants' Revolt"	7 May 2002
The atmosphere in the Edwardian Country House is tense as our 19 volunteers continue to come to terms with their new Edwardian lives. Upstairs plans are afoot to host a fund-raising fête in the gardens to help the local hospital. But the benevolent masters of Manderston may be missing hardships closer to home. Amongst the staff there are serious complaints about working hours and living conditions. Without time off, they feel they cannot go on. The chef takes matters into his own hands and, breaking all the rules, he takes the two ladies of the house on a tour of conditions downstairs. The mistress of the house takes immediate action. Two new maids are hired, but will it be enough to curb the swell of working class militancy below stairs?
4	4	"Cold Comfort"	14 May 2002
Hunting, shooting and fishing were the mainstay of country house life and the master has no desire to duck out of these Edwardian activities. While the men get back to nature, the women at home begin to question their roles in Edwardian society. Sexual restrictions particularly affect Avril, the unmarried sister of Lady Olliff-Cooper, who has to bear the discomforts of being single and dependent. The new scullery maid looks like she will have no such problems—already she is the object of the hallboy's affection. But living as they do under the same roof, the relationship must be kept secret if they want to keep their jobs.
5	5	"Home and Empire"	21 May 2002
The British Empire is at its height and as a celebration of British achievement abroad, the family is to host a glorious fancy-dress Empire Ball. This means dancing practice, the creation of beautiful costumes and more work in the kitchen. For Guy the idea of having a role in the Empire is remote, but his Indian tutor, Mr Raj-Singh, caught between the worlds of upstairs and downstairs, is determined to bring the highs and lows of Imperial power back to life. So, before the Ball, Sir John agrees to allow Reji to organise a 'Raj' night as a celebration of the British in India. In honour of the guests the hosts will serve a glorious curry supper. At least, that was the plan. Chef falls ill and upstairs cannot be asked to postpone. A substitute team of Antonia, Kenny and Ellen must prepare the dinner alone. Monsieur Dubiard gives instructions from his sick bed taking them through grinding the spices, cooking the breads and making the bhajis. Contemporary thinkers including Yasmin Alibhai-Brown and Darcus Howe arrive at the house to challenge the jingoistic celebrations and to question the system of command, control and hierarchy within the house. As the glittering Ball gets under way, how long can power remain concentrated in the hands of the few?
6	6	"Winners and Losers"	28 May 2002
Emotions are running high in Manderston as the cast's Edwardian life is drawing to a close and everyone has to face up to going back to his or her normal life in the 21st century. After three months' exposure to nothing but Edwardian culture the family and staff consider what their Edwardian future might have been. A servants' ball brings the family and the staff in direct contact on the staff's home ground. This proves an uncomfortable experience for Sir John who is beginning to realise that the apparent deference of his servants may only have been surface deep. As they leave the house, tears of joy and sadness flow and we get our first glimpse of the cast in modern dress. The hierarchy is no more and it is hard to see these confident young people allowing it to return. For upstairs as well as down, a way of life at Manderston is coming to an end.

== Home media ==
This VHS and DVD were released 27 May 2003 from PBS Home Video.

== Reception ==
Dru Sefton writing for the Current, the show ranked among the top 10 for its year on Channel 4.
