= United States Office of Education =

U.S. education agency from 1867 to 1972

Edward Penfield poster promoting the Bureau of Education's United States School Garden Army (1918)

The Office of Education, at times known as the Department of Education and the Bureau of Education, was a small unit in the federal government of the United States within the United States Department of the Interior from 1867 to 1972. It is now separated into and succeeded by the United States Department of Education and the United States Department of Health and Human Services.

== Background ==
In 1857, Congressman Justin S. Morrill introduced a bill for the establishment, through the aid of public land grants, of State colleges throughout the country primarily for the teaching of agriculture and the mechanical arts. On Monday, February 1, 1858, a petition of the Ohio State Board of Agriculture was presented to the Senate "praying that a donation of land be made to each of the States for the establishment of agricultural colleges." Neither of the proposals was accepted until the time of the 16th President, with the Lincoln administration (1861–65), after which it became necessary to gather information on the many schools already in existence, as well as on those being built. The 1862 Morrill Land-Grant Act would then drive the effort to create those land-grant institutions.

Following the Civil War, shifts in political thought led to increased federal involvement in education. The pre-war tradition of local funding of and control over education clashed with a push from reformers for increased state and federal educational leadership. Additionally, the creation of social science associations generated interest in data-driven approaches to governance at all levels.

== Inception and development ==
Educator Zalmon Richards was largely responsible for Congress creating the Office.

Henry Barnard was appointed as the first United States Commissioner of Education in 1867. Barnard's personal book collection, later purchased by the Bureau, was the nucleus of what would become the National Library of Education. Barnard resigned on March 15, 1870, and was replaced by John Eaton who remained Commissioner until 1886.

=== Names ===
- Department of Education (March 2, 1867 – June 30, 1869)
- Office of Education (July 1, 1869 – 1870) under the United States Department of Interior
- Bureau of Education (1870–1929) under the United States Department of Interior
- Office of Education (1929–1939) under the United States Department of Interior
- Office of Education (1939–1953) under the Federal Security Agency
- Office of Education (April 1953 – May 4, 1980) under the Presidential Cabinet-level, U.S. Department of Health, Education and Welfare

== Functions ==
The Office of Education was created to meet the need to gather statistical information on the fast-growing educational institutions of the United States, along with histories and descriptive articles, pamphlets, reports and books, often in coordination with state universities.

Reformers, especially Radical Republicans and Progressive and liberal Democrats, hoped that the Office would become a powerful federal agency, but were frustrated at every turn by Congress, which did not or want to impose on states and local jurisdictions in the cities, towns and counties to control educational policy. In the aftermath of the Civil War, "states' rights" was still in full sway, and it would take several other domestic and foreign crises in the coming decades to bring a sense of a more centralized and national policy.

The Bureau, and later Office, of Education was a unit of the U.S. Department of the Interior, therefore it was under the aegis of the Secretary of the Interior. It had no power to control the actions of educational institutions. At times during its first decades of its existence, attempts were made to change its name. These names (Board, Department, Office, and Bureau) were considered. In 1873, a bill (H. R. 3782) was introduced which would change its name to the Bureau of Education and Statistics.

The Commissioner of Education was required to prepare a Report annually, which was printed and given to members of Congress (U.S. Senators and Representatives), other governmental officials and certain other persons. In 1875, 20,000 copies of the Report for 1874 were printed; 5,000 copies for the use of members of the Senate, 10,000 copies for the use of members of the House of Representatives, and 5,000 copies for the use of the Commissioner of Education and their Office.

The Office gathered information on diverse educational facilities such as those being built (i.e. the famous Carlisle Indian Industrial School at Carlisle, Pennsylvania in the east and near western reservations) to bring an education and vocational/agricultural training to American Indians in which there had already been historically established a direct and prominent national Federal role and obligation towards the treatment and education of Indians as well as all of the facilities in all of the other places.

== Dissolution and legacy ==
In 1972, Public Law 92-318 provided the repeal of the law which had created the Office of Education. The repeal took effect on July 1, 1972.

The Department of Education Organization Act was signed into law in 1979 under the administration of 39th President Jimmy Carter, resulting in the creation of the cabinet-level U.S. Department of Education and renaming the United States Department of Health, Education, and Welfare to the modern day U.S. Department of Health and Human Services.

The Office of Education had a unifying influence on the different educational institutions of the United States, caused by supplying the leaders of the institutions with information that enabled them to know of the practices of other institutions. The direct organizational descendant of the Office of Education is the National Center for Education Statistics (NCES), part of the Institute of Education Sciences in the U.S. Department of Education.

=== Successors ===
- United States Department of Education, (1980–present)
- United States Department of Health and Human Services, (1980–present)
