= Coal House (TV series) =

Welsh television series

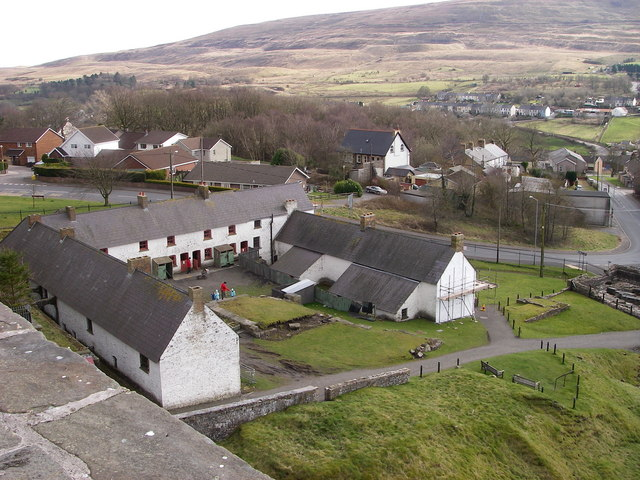
- Stack Square was where the Coal House series was filmed
- Country of origin: Wales
- No. of series: 2
- No. of episodes: 12

Production
- Running time: 30mins

Original release
- Network: BBC One Wales
- Release: October 2007 – November 2008

Coal House is a Welsh television series made by Indus Films for BBC Wales, and broadcast on BBC One Wales, with a subsequent UK wide repeat of both series on BBC Four. Series 1 was set in the depressed economic coalfields of 1927. Series 2 was set in 1944 as World War II draws to a close; it was broadcast on BBC across the UK from October 2009.

== Plot ==
The series follows three or more families who are placed in a location which replicates the lifestyle of Welsh people living in a coal mining town of that period. The chosen families leave all 21st century luxuries behind, swapping a modern high-tech life for a miner's cottage in Stack Square in the Welsh hills of Blaenavon. The mines are owned by Mr. Blanford, and are 4 miles (6.4 km) up the hills. Men and boys over the age of 14 are required to work in the mines.

== Production ==
=== Series 1 ===
Filmed from early October 2007 and shown from late October 2007, three families (the Cartwright family from Penarth, the Griffiths family from Ceredigion; and the Phillips family from the Vale of Glamorgan), cope with daily life as the Welsh mining community lived it 80 years ago - a year after the last general strike and before the pits were nationalised.

For men and boys over 14, there was the long walk over mountains to work as coal miners at Blaentillery No.2 Mine - the last working mine of its kind in the UK. The women had to run the home. Making a cup of tea involved the hard work of collecting water from a pump and lighting a fire.

A special hour-length final episode was recorded which included footage from a Hunger March Concert held at Park Street Chapel, Blaenafon. Blaenavon Male Voice Choir took part in the concert, along with members of the Coal House families who sang and recited verse.

=== Series 2 ===
Series 2, titled Coal House at War, was filmed in October 2008 in the same Blaenavon location, but set in 1944.

Three families - the Griffiths family from Ammanford, the Paisey family from Cardiff, and the Tranter Davies family from Merthyr Tydfil - live life as it was in a mining community during World War II. In an attempt to gain an insight into how people lived during the war, they swapped a hectic twenty-first century life for a more simplified way of living.

As in the first series, the men - and boys aged over fourteen - had to work a long day as coal miners at Blaentillery No. 2 Mine. Once again, they have to cope with the demands of the mine owner, Mr Blanford. The men of the family were also expected to do their duty in the Home Guard after a long day underground. Mines were considered a target, so inclusion in the Home Guard was vital. The women had to run the home under 1944 conditions, which included war work and feeding their families with limited rations. The families were joined by evacuees and Bevin Boys, who were conscripted to fight and then sent to dig for coal.

== Setting ==
The series is filmed mostly on location in period cottages at Stack Square, Blaenavon. The Stack Square cottages were built between 1789 and 1792 to house part of the Blaenavon Ironworks workforce.

== Coal House Diary ==
In 2008, Gwen Cartwright, a 12-year-old participant in series one, published her diary of her experience – Coal House Diary.

== See also ==
- The 1900 Island

== Gallery ==
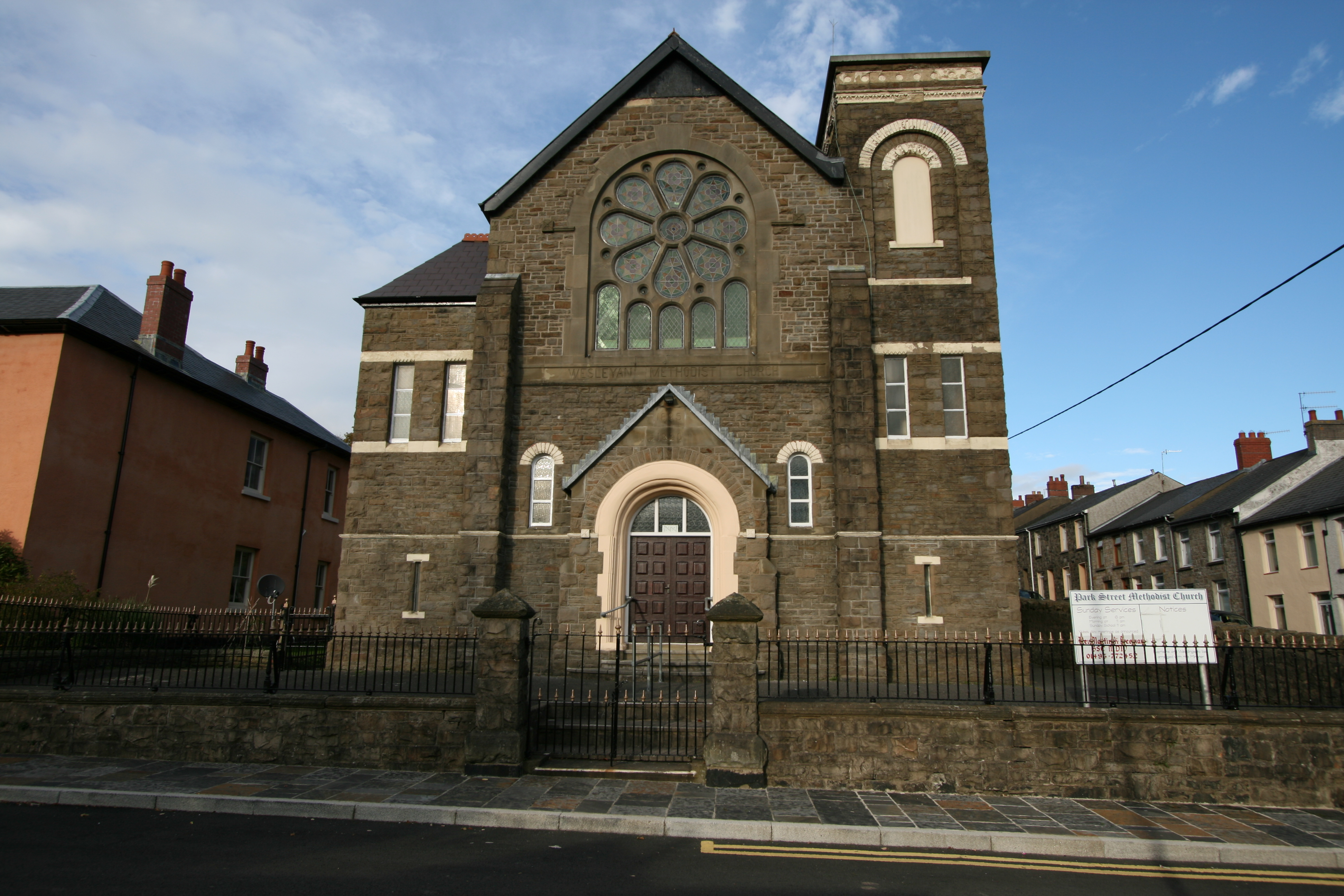
Park Street Chapel, Blaenafon

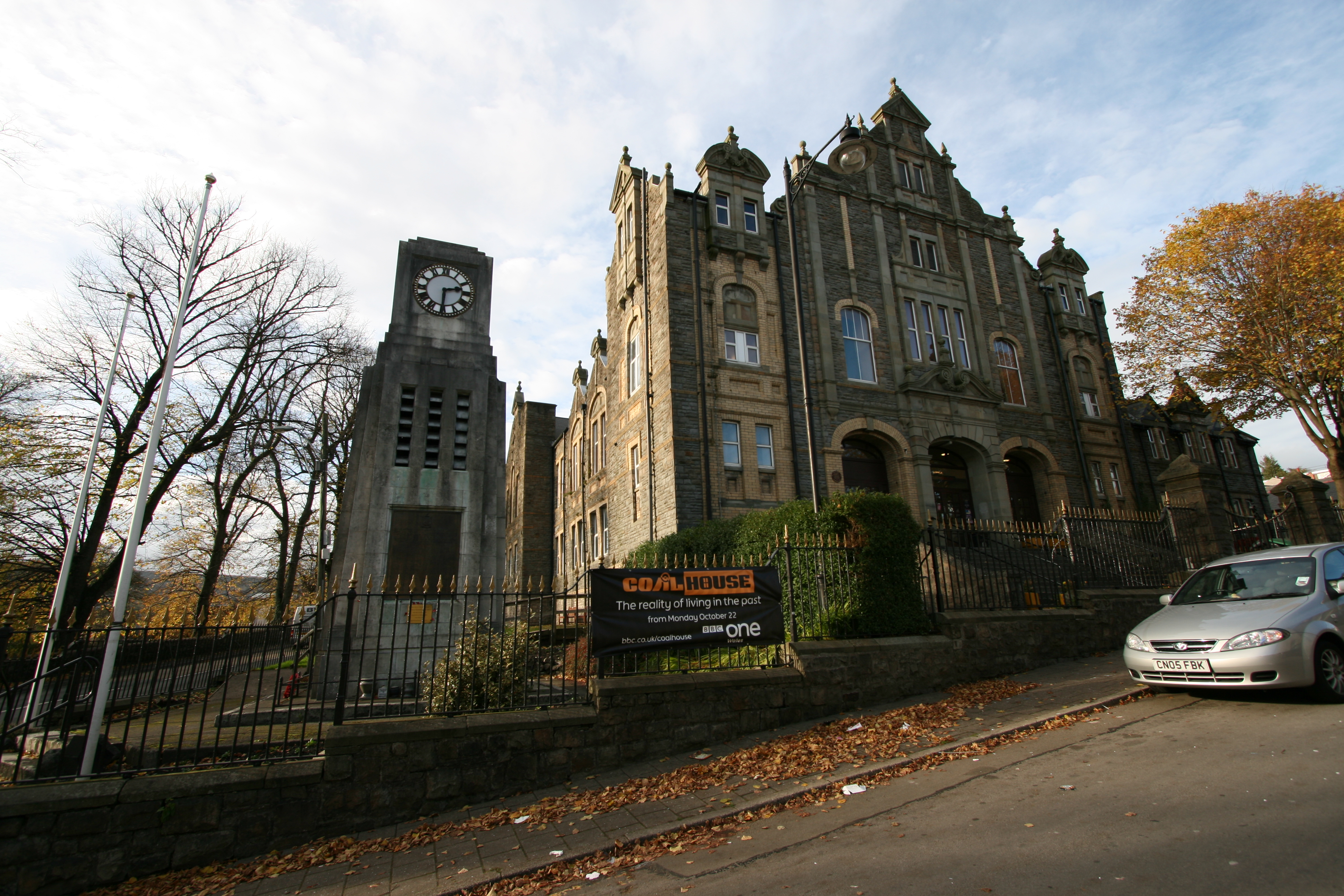
War Memorial and Workingmen's Institute, Blaenafon
