= Dan Sefton =

British screenwriter

Dan Sefton (born 20th century) is a British screenwriter, best known for the dramas Trust Me and The Good Karma Hospital. Prior to screenwriting, he worked as a doctor.

== Early life ==
Sefton's mother was a doctor, while his father was a civil servant. He qualified as a doctor in 1995. Early in his medical career, he worked in South Africa, which would later help inspire Good Karma.

== Television ==
Early work included all four of the BBC's popular continuing dramas, Doctors, EastEnders, Casualty and its spinoff, Holby City. In 2017, Sefton created the medical drama The Good Karma Hospital for ITV and Tiger Aspect Productions. The series is shot in Unawatuna in southern Sri Lanka, Thiranagama Golden Beach Restaurant and some other places in Galle District. It was recommissioned for a second series. Filming for the second series started in August 2017 and was broadcast from 18 March 2018. Season 3 has been confirmed and will return in 2019.

In 2016, he created Delicious, starring Dawn French, and in 2017 Trust Me, starring Jodie Whittaker. Due to Jodie Whittaker's casting as the Thirteenth Doctor in Doctor Who, the second series was set on the neurological unit of South Lothian Hospital, following Syrian tour veteran Captain James 'Jamie' McKay. In 2019, BBC One broadcast his crime series, The Mallorca Files.

During the COVID-19 pandemic, which impacted the filming of the second series of The Mallorca Files, Sefton returned to medical work. On 11 January 2022 it was announced Sefton would be developing a drama series about the life of ex-Genesis drummer Chris Stewart.

== Writing credits ==
Production	Notes	Broadcaster
Doctors	7 episodes (2000–2001)	BBC One
Eastenders	1 episode (2001)	BBC One
Holby City	11 episodes (2001–2010)	BBC One
Casualty	2 episodes (2001–2002)	BBC One
The Eustace Bros.	Episode 1.5 (2003)	BBC One
Born and Bred	6 episodes (2003–2005)	ITV
Monarch of the Glen	2 episodes (2004–2005)	BBC One
Secret Diary of A Call Girl	Episode 4.7 (2011)	ITV
Gates	Series creator, all episodes (2012)	Sky1
Death in Paradise	Death In The Clinic (2013)	BBC One
Mr. Selfridge	3 episodes (2014)	ITV
The Five	Episode 1.3 (2016)	Sky1
Delicious	Series creator, 8 episodes (2016–2019)	BSkyB
Trust Me	Series creator, all episodes (2017–2019)	BBC One
Porters	Series creator (2017–2019)	Dave
The Good Karma Hospital	Series creator, 7 episodes (2017–2022)	ITV
The Mallorca Files	Series creator (2019–)	BBC One (series 1-2); Amazon Prime Video (series 3-)
Finders Keepers	Series creator (2024)	Channel 5
