= List of fire-retardant materials =

Materials designed with burn slowly or withstand high temperatures

Fire-retardant materials are designed to burn slowly and less flammable. Fire-retardants work by interfering with chemical reactions that cause reduce combustion, such as by absorbing heat, diluting oxygen, or creating a protective layer.

Fire-retardant materials should not be confused with fire-resistant materials. A fire resistant material is one which is designed to resist burning and withstand heat. An example of a fire-resistant material is one which is used in bunker gear worn by firefighters to protect them from the flames of a burning building.

In the United Kingdom, after two significant construction fires which resulted in a combined loss of £1,500 million, The Joint Code of Practice was introduced by the Fire Protection Association (FPA), the UK's national fire safety organisation, to prevent fires on buildings undergoing construction work. The Joint Code of Practice provides advice on how to prevent fires such as through the use of flame-retardant temporary protection materials: for example, some high quality floor protectors are designed to burn slowly and prevent the spread of fires.

== Fire-retardant materials used in buildings ==
- Iron
- Mineral wool
- Gypsum boards
- Asbestos cement
- Perlite boards
- Calcium silicate
- Sodium silicate
- Potassium silicate
- Treated lumber plywood
- Treated vegetable fiber (e.g., cotton, jute, kenaf, hemp, flax, etc..)
- Fire-retardant treated wood
- Brick
- Concrete
- Cement render
- Intumescent paint
- Glass
- Magnesium oxide (MgO)
- Geobond asbestos substitute

== Fire textiles ==
- PBI
- Aramid - para and meta
- Flame retardant cotton
- Coated nylon
- Carbon foam (CFOAM)
- Melamine
- Modacrylic
- Noflan

== Phasing-out ==
Many common brominated flame retardants are being phased-out by manufacturers. Asbestos is another fireproofing material that has been largely phased out, due to its health risks, including asbestosis and mesothelioma.

== See also ==
- Fireproof
- Non-flammable
