= Fire Service College =

Firefighting academy in Gloucestershire, England

Coordinates: 51.995°N 1.680°W

Fire Service College Limited

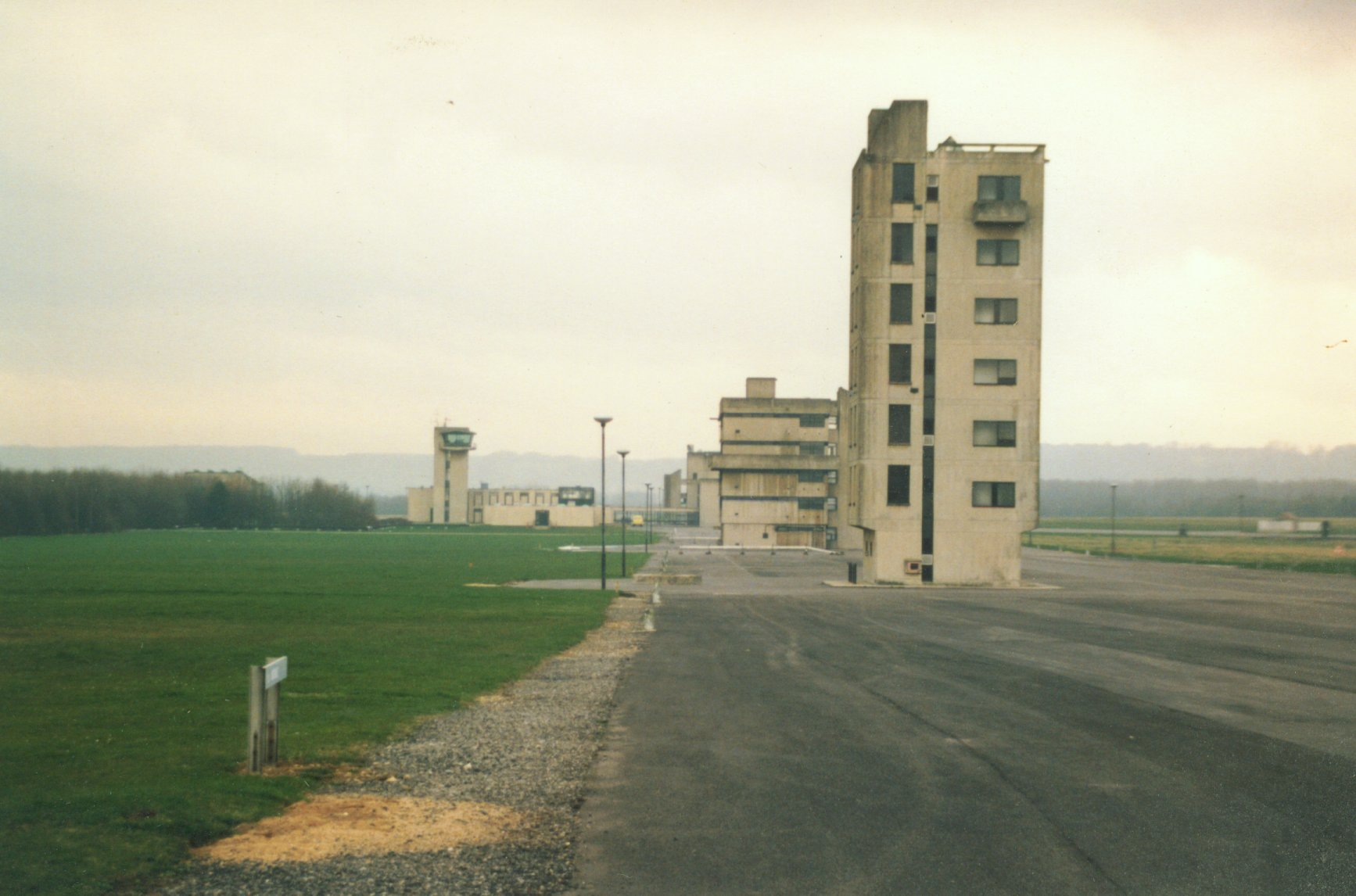
- The high-rise fire house
- Type: Limited company
- Industry: Fire and rescue training
- Headquarters: Moreton-in-Marsh, Gloucestershire, United Kingdom
- Area served: United Kingdom
- Owner: Capita
- Website: www.fireservicecollege.ac.uk

The Fire Service College is responsible for providing leadership, management and advanced operational training courses for senior fire officers from the United Kingdom and foreign fire authorities. It is located at Moreton-in-Marsh in Gloucestershire, England. It has been owned by Capita since February 2013, having previously been an executive agency and trading fund of the Department for Communities and Local Government.

The college provides the full range of training for firefighters at all levels, including initial training for recruit firefighters. Scotland closed its own Scottish Fire Service College in 2015 and set up the Scottish Fire and Rescue Service National Training Centre near Cambuslang. As a result many Scottish fire officers go to Moreton-in-Marsh for more specialist and senior ranking courses.

The college has a wide range of facilities for theoretical education and practical training in firefighting, fire safety and accident and emergency work.

== History ==
Under the Fire Brigades Act 1938 (1 & 2 Geo. 6. c. 72), the UK Government set up a training centre at Saltdean near Brighton in 1941, to train National Fire Service personnel. With the return to local authority control after World War II, the British government decided to standardise the way in which the fire service worked. The college at Saltdean became too small and the Home Office opened the Senior Staff College at Wotton House, Dorking in Surrey in 1949, to train senior officers from all over the country. On 4 June 1966, they decided to do the same for the lower ranks and established the Fire Service Technical College at Moreton-in-Marsh on a disused RAF wartime airfield about 3 km (2 miles) outside the town. In 1981, the Staff College in Dorking closed and amalgamated with the Technical College to form the Fire Service College on the Moreton-in-Marsh site.

RAF Moreton-in-Marsh was, as the home station of 21 Operational Training Unit, RAF Bomber Command responsible for the training of aircrew to fly Wellington bombers. The Station also flew operations, and sent aircraft on the large bomber raids on the German cities of Cologne, Dresden and Hamburg. The airbase remained operational until the late 1950s. The government then used the base to teach fire fighting to military personnel undergoing their National Service.

The Home Office opened the college on the 500-acre (2.0 km^{2}) site in 1968. The first students whilst having most of the facilities seen today had no proper accommodation and were bunked in large huts (in the area that is now the cricket and football pitches), which originally housed the RAF personnel when it was an operational airbase. The Staff College at Dorking was closed in 1981 and all training was transferred to Moreton-in-Marsh.

In April 1992, the college became an executive agency and trading fund under the Fire Service Trading Fund Order 1992 (Statutory Instrument 1992 No. 640). In June 2001, the responsibility for the college transferred from the Home Office to the Department for Transport, Local Government and the Regions and just one year later to the Office of the Deputy Prime Minister and then to the Department for Communities and Local Government.

On 16 May 2009, a fire broke out at one of the appliance bays in the college, destroying 11 fire engines at a cost of £116,000 each. The blaze was not suspicious.

In April 2011, the Government announced it was studying different options for private investment in the college to allow it to achieve its full potential and in March 2012 it was concluded that the best option was full privatisation. In December 2012, Capita was selected as the preferred bidder and the sale was completed for £10 million on 28 February 2013.

== Education ==
Educationally, the college has lecture facilities and specialised areas such as IT suites, a chemistry laboratory and hydraulics laboratory. The tutors are drawn from both the academic world and from officers serving in fire and rescue services around the country. Courses available range from firefighter recruits through junior officer development to senior officer management courses right up to chief officer level. To support the educational side, there as a large administration complex and a library of fire related literature. Students come mainly from the UK but several countries also send students.

== Operational training ==
Operational training is carried out in several purpose built areas of the college, including these:

- Breathing apparatus complex
- Industrial complexes
- Domestic property
- High rise property
- Areas for electrical, pool fire and fixed installation training
- Small-scale versions of petroleum and chemical installations
- A concrete "ship", MV Sir Henry (named for Sir Henry Martin Smith, His Majesty's Chief Inspector of Fire Services, appointed 1948)
- A railway, which includes a section of rail with locomotives and carriages of various types, both passenger and freight.
- A mock motorway (M96)
- Urban search and rescue (USAR)
- A range of aircraft including helicopters, military and civil passenger aircraft including a simulated Boeing 747
- Fire behaviour units

To support the operational training the college has a fully equipped appliance room with a number of appliances from different manufacturers including pumps, aerial appliances, rescue tenders, USAR vehicles, and hazmat appliances. There is also a large workshop to maintain the appliances and all the other operational equipment used.

A 400-yard (370 m) section of one of the former runways is configured to imitate, in detail, a typical UK motorway. it is used to teach firefighters and other first responders, including police and ambulance, how to deal with road traffic incidents. It is signposted as the "M96 motorway" (a fictional name; were it real, the Great Britain road numbering scheme would place it in Scotland).

The fire service college training delivery team is composed of in-house specialist instructors and partnership organisations delivering courses using these facilities. For example the National Ambulance Resilience Unit train specialist responders from across the UK ambulance sector. Other partnership courses include the Fire Services HazMat training course delivered in partnership with Collective Resilience. The college hosts a number of other partners which can build tailor made course for international government organisations, the public sectors or specialist industries.

== Social ==
The social and domestic facilities include the following:

- Standard and deluxe accommodation for 600 students
- Television rooms and lounge areas
- Chapel
- The 'Four Shires' Restaurant and bar complex
- Sports complex with a 25 m × 9 m (82 ft × 30 ft) swimming pool, sauna, four squash courts a sports hall and fitness suite
- Several football and cricket pitches
- Two tennis courts

== Other uses ==
The college site is also home to the Fire Protection Association (FPA).

In 2003, the BBC used the location to film the docudrama The Day Britain Stopped about a series of catastrophic transport accidents. For the purposes of the programme, the motorway was temporarily rebranded "M91".

The college has been on occasions shut over weekends and used by the military and police for training, as the live fire buildings and complexes allow training in certain operational areas that cannot easily be carried out or reconstructed elsewhere.

In November 2016, the site was used by HTIS for an Airsoft Military Simulation event called Blue Fox II.

A weekly Parkrun event is hosted on the grounds of the Fire Service College's leisure centre. The event, which is open to the public, was first held on 8 December 2018. The run was paused on 7 March 2020, just before the cessation of all UK Parkrun events because of the COVID-19 pandemic. Due to security restrictions on the site, the event was not held again until 24 May 2025.

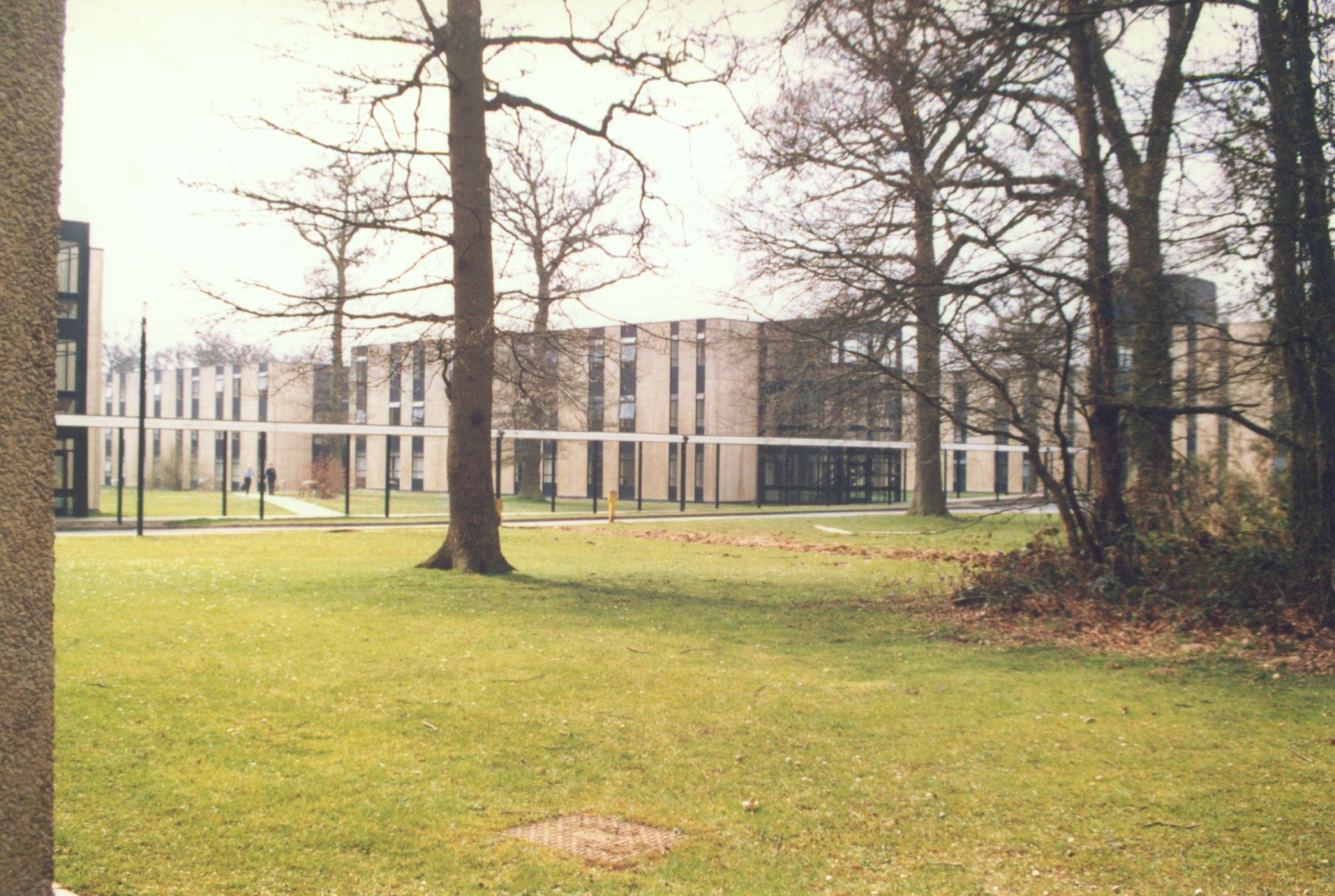
Accommodation blocks

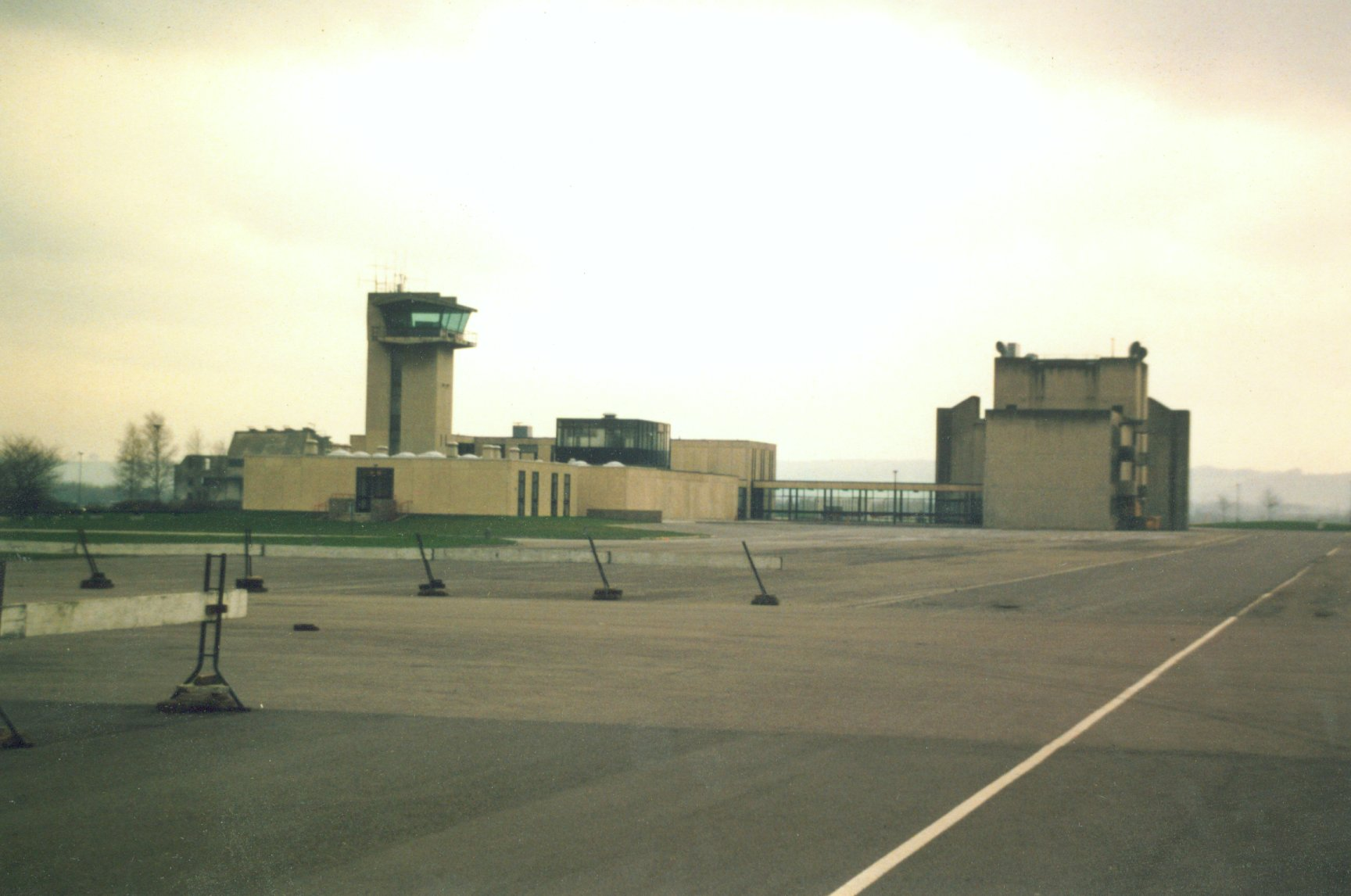
Breathing apparatus complex

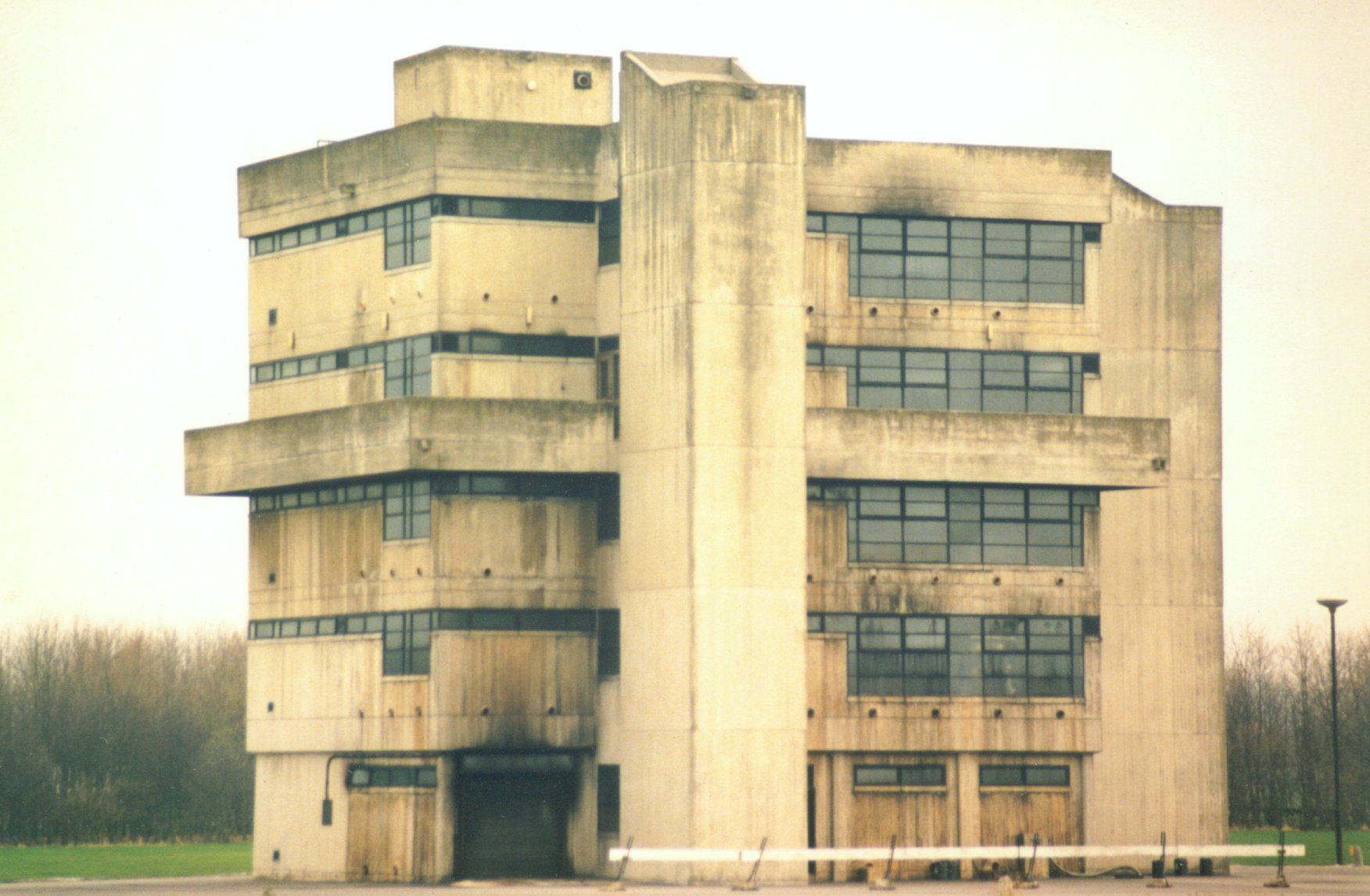
Industrial fire house

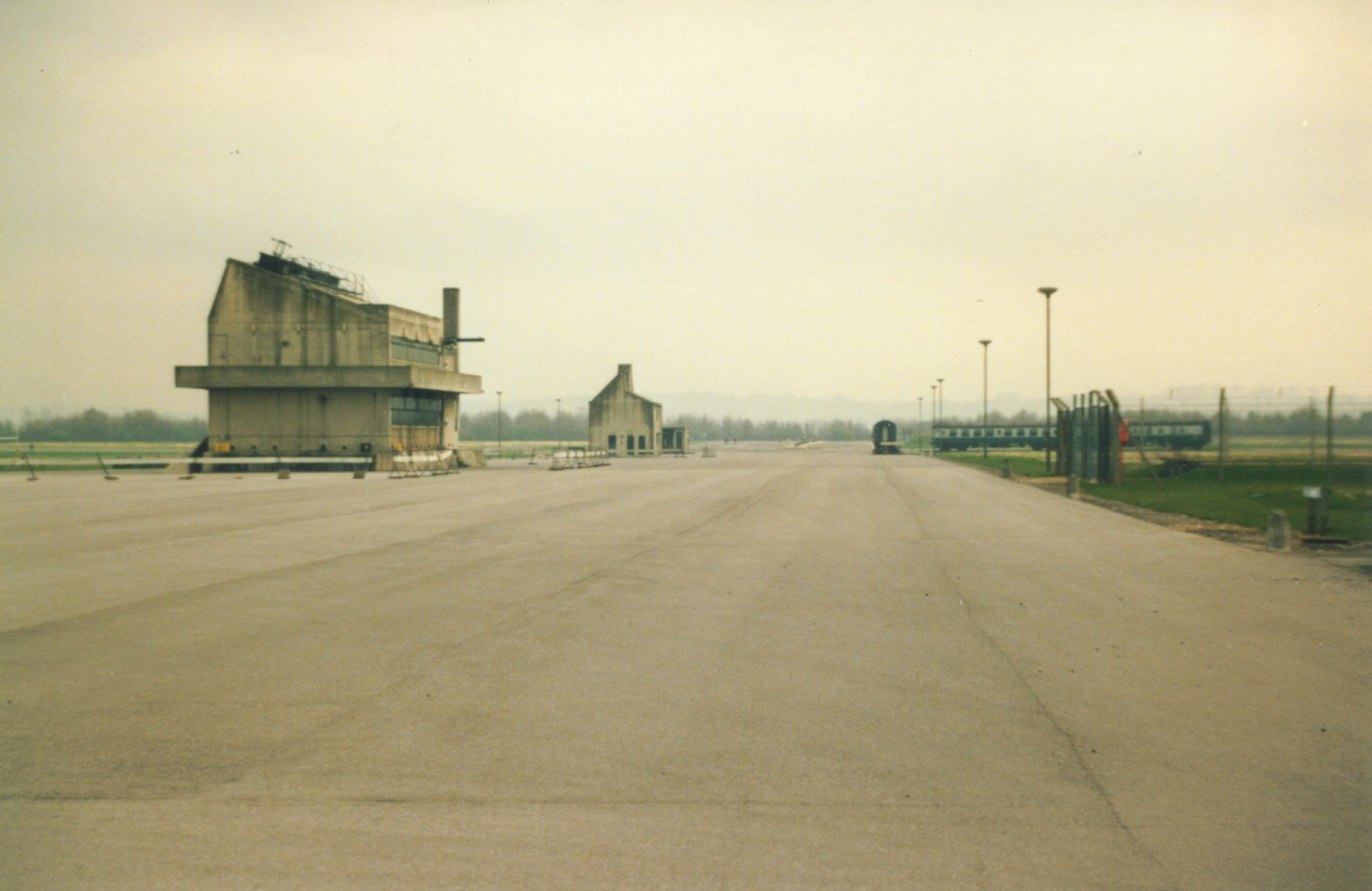
View showing the domestic house and railway in background

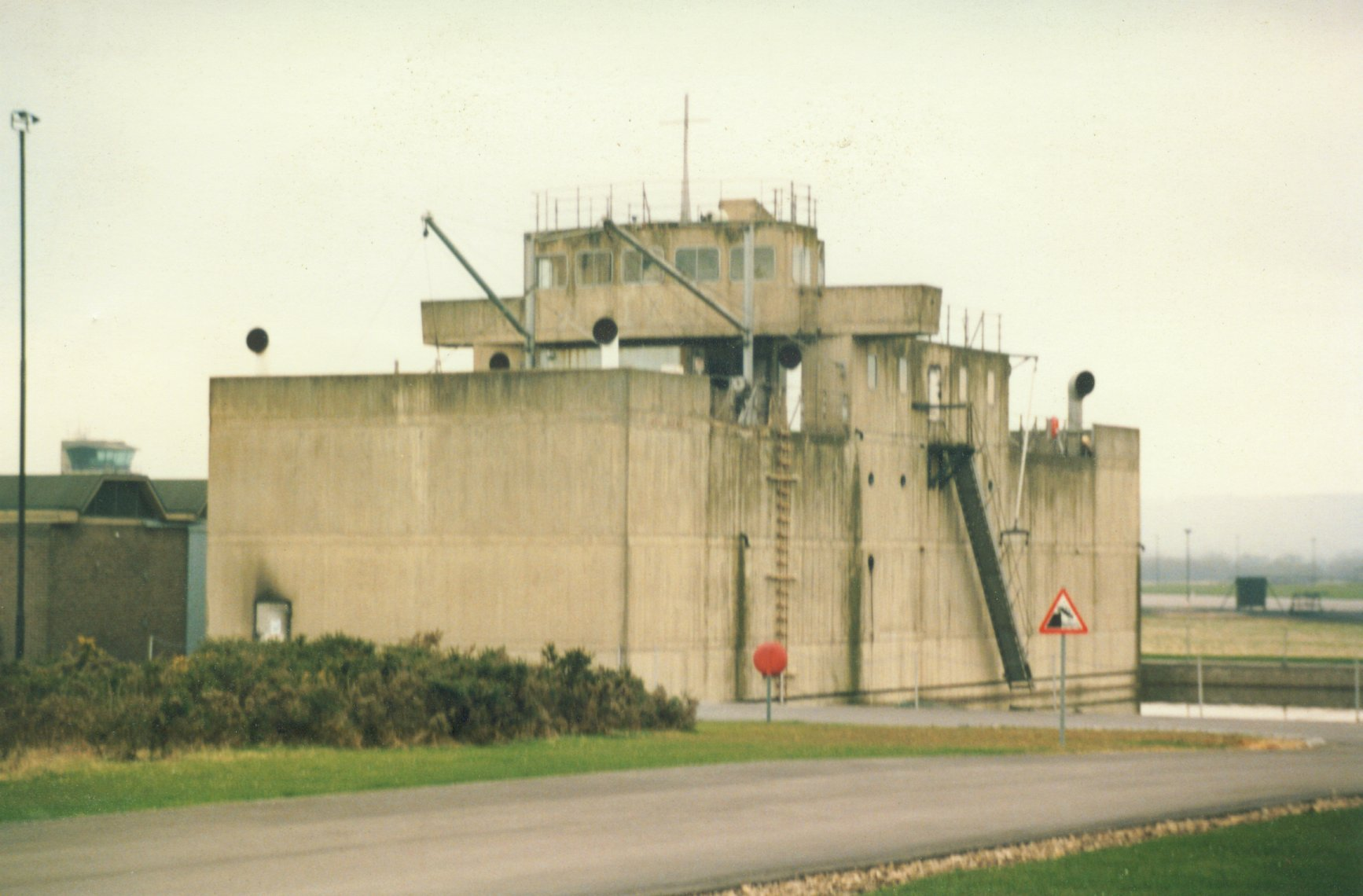
The concrete ship MV Sir Henry

== See also ==
- New Dimension programme
- UK Government Decontamination Service
- Women in firefighting
