= Richard Harvey (composer) =

British composer and musician

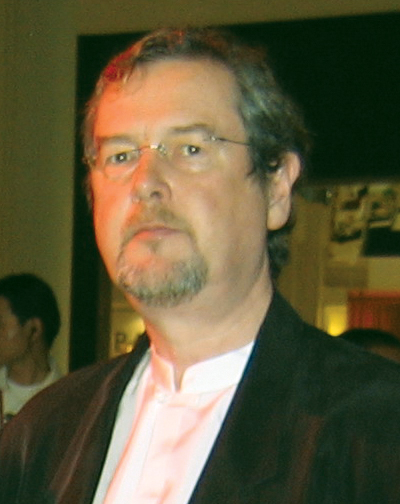
- Harvey attending the premiere of King Naresuan in 2007

Background information
- Born: Richard Allen Harvey; 25 September 1953 (age 73); Enfield, Middlesex, England
- Occupations: Composer, multi-instrumentalist
- Instruments: Crumhorn, recorder, flute, keyboards, vocals, mandolin
- Years active: 1970s–present

Richard Allen Harvey (born 25 September 1953) is an English composer and musician. Originally a member of the mediaevalist progressive rock group Gryphon, he is best known now for his film and television soundtracks. He is also known for his guitar concerto Concerto Antico, which was composed for the guitarist John Williams and the London Symphony Orchestra.

In April 2012, UK radio listeners voted Richard Harvey's Concerto Antico into the Classic FM Hall of Fame for the first time.

== Early life and career ==
Born in Enfield, Middlesex, Harvey became involved in music, learning the recorder when he was four years old, switching first to percussion and later playing clarinet in the British Youth Symphony Orchestra. By the time he graduated from London's Royal College of Music in 1972, he was accomplished on the recorder, flute, krumhorn, and other mediaeval and Renaissance-era instruments, as well as the mandolin and various keyboards. He could have joined the London Philharmonic Orchestra, but instead chose to work with Musica Reservata, an early music ensemble. He subsequently met another RCM graduate, Brian Gulland, and went on to form the progressive rock and folk band Gryphon. During that period, he also worked with other folk rock musicians such as Richard and Linda Thompson and Ashley Hutchings. When Gryphon wound down in the late 1970s, he became a session musician, playing on Kate Bush's Lionheart, Gerry Rafferty's Night Owl, Sweet's Level Headed and Gordon Giltrap's Fear of the Dark and The Peacock Party, among others. He also had a brief spell in new wave outfit The Banned.

== Film and television career ==
After working with film composer Maurice Jarre in the mid 1970s, he became involved in composing for film and television. His first work was to provide music for the television series Tales of the Unexpected in 1979. He has subsequently supplied scores to over 80 television and film projects.

Notable works include 1979's Martian Chronicles ending titles, the horror film House of the Long Shadows (1983), 1984's wistful Shroud for a Nightingale theme, hauntingly set in the Dorian mode, used subsequently in all the PD James detective series (and subsequently re-used for the follow-up series), the action sequel The Dirty Dozen: Next Mission (1985), British films such as The Assam Garden (1985), Steaming (1985), Defence of the Realm (1986) and Half Moon Street (1986), Alan Bleasdale's G.B.H in 1991, which he co-wrote with Elvis Costello (and which won them, jointly, a British Academy of Film and Television Arts award), Luther (2003) and, more recently, in 2006, Ron Howard's The Da Vinci Code and Gabriel Range's Death of a President.

In addition he has been a musician on such films as The Lion King, Enemy of the State and Harry Potter and the Prisoner of Azkaban.

In 1981, Richard Harvey's "Exchange" and "Water Course" from Harvey's Nifty Digits release (KPM Library #1251) were featured in a popular Sesame Street segment filmed at the Binney and Smith Crayola crayon factory in Easton, Pennsylvania.

Harvey also composed “Dynamics”, which is best known as the theme song for TBS's World Championship Wrestling for most of the 1980s, but was also used for NBC’s coverage of the 1982 World Series.

Harvey is also a prolific composer of production music and founding partner of West One Music Group along with Edwin Cox and Tony Prior. Among his compositions is "Reach for the Stars", which has been used in numerous movie trailers, commercials, and television shows.

== Other projects ==
In 1984, he was a conductor on one of the Classic Rock series of albums by the London Symphony Orchestra. He has frequently toured and recorded with the guitarist John Williams on projects including the 2002 album Magic Box. He also played on the 2004 album The Opera Band by pop/classical crossover act Amici Forever, which reached #74 on the Billboard Top 200 albums and #2 on the Billboard Top Classical crossover chart. He worked with Elvis Costello on his 2006 album My Flame Burns Blue. A skilled multi-instrumentalist, he has a collection of over 700 different instruments from around the world.

Since 2005, "John Williams & Richard Harvey's World Tour" has appeared in many countries, from Japan and China to Ireland and Luxembourg, with the duo playing a mixture of world and classical music spanning five continents and five centuries, featuring Chinese, African and European instruments.

Harvey's first recorder concerto (Concerto Incantato) enjoyed its world premiere on Michala Petri's CD English Recorder Concertos in March 2012, alongside works by Malcolm Arnold and Gordon Jacob.

== Career highlights ==
- 1974 Release of Gryphon's Red Queen to Gryphon Three
- 1977 Composed station theme for Hospital Radio Moorfields (on air 1974–2006)
- 1983 Composed music for Terrahawks
- 1984 Principal conductor of the London Symphony Orchestra for Classic Rock
- 1985 Composed Fantasia with Royal Philharmonic Orchestra (which includes "Reach for the Stars")
- 1987 Composed music for the Children's ITV series The Gemini Factor
- 1988 Regular member of John Williams and Friends
- 1989 Composed Oratorio Plague and the Moonflower (to libretto by Ralph Steadman performed in Exeter, Salisbury, Canterbury and St Paul's Cathedral, and recipient of Best BBC TV Art's Film in 1990)
- 1991 British Academy award for the score for GBH (with Elvis Costello)
- 1991 Composed A Time of Miracles for W11 Opera
- 1994 Performed all featured woodwind solos on the score for The Lion King
- 1995 Composed Concerto Antico for John Williams and the London Symphony Orchestra
- 1998 Composed the theme for BBC series "The Ambassador"
- 1999 Composed the score for the Jim Henson Company's Animal Farm
- 1999 Composed Fantasia 2
- 2000 Composed score for the acclaimed Hallmark project Arabian Nights
- 2001 Composed score for the Thai historical epic The Legend of Suriyothai
- 2002 Composed score for feature film Luther
- 2004 Subhanahongsa Award from the Federation of National Film Associations of Thailand for The Macabre Case of Prom Piram
- 2005 Composed Ivor Novello nominated score for feature-length drama, Colditz
- 2005 Composed score for feature film Three aka Survival Island
- 2006 Composed score for Death of a President, International Critics' Award winning film at Toronto International Film Festival (September 2006)
- 2007 Composed score for King Naresuan, the follow-up to Suriyothai
- 2009 Composed recorder concerto (Concerto Incantanto) for Michala Petri and the City Chamber Orchestra of Hong Kong
- 2012–14 Conducted the score to Interstellar
- 2015 Composed score for the French animated film The Little Prince (with Hans Zimmer)
- 2017 Had his music featured in the attraction "The Hall of Presidents" at Walt Disney World

== Selected discography ==
- Terrahawks (CD, Fanderson. Original incidental music from the series, released in 2002)
