= The Man Who Broke Britain =

British television drama

- Genre: Drama; Docufiction
- Written by: Simon Finch; Gabriel Range
- Directed by: Gabriel Range
- Starring: Will Ashcroft; Dean Knowsley; Amani Zain
- Narrated by: Tim Pigott-Smith
- Composer: Samuel Sim
- Country of origin: United Kingdom
- Original language: English

Production
- Producer: Simon Finch
- Running time: 90 minutes

Original release
- Network: BBC Two
- Release: 9 December 2004

Related
- The Day Britain Stopped

The Man Who Broke Britain is a 2004 BBC Television drama about a financial collapse triggered by a devastating terrorist strike.
