= Westburn, South Lanarkshire =

District of Cambuslang, Scotland

Coordinates: 55.820940°N 4.143034°W

Westburn: Scottish Gaelic: Srath an Iar
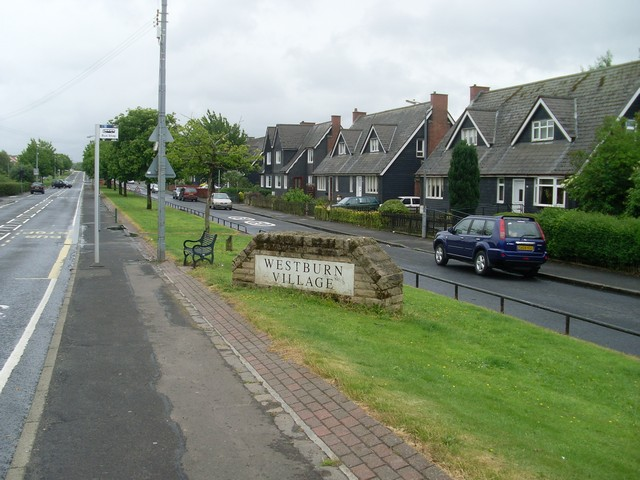
- Westburn Road and wooden houses

- Location within Scotland Westburn (Scotland)
- Population: 2,000
- OS grid reference: NS65750607
- Country: Scotland
- Sovereign state: United Kingdom
- Post town: GLASGOW
- Postcode district: G72 7
- Dialling code: 0141
- Police: Scotland
- Fire: Scottish
- Ambulance: Scottish
- UK Parliament: Rutherglen and Hamilton West
- Scottish Parliament: Rutherglen

Westburn is a district of the town of Cambuslang in South Lanarkshire, Scotland. It was formerly home to a steel works and power station which were the area's major employers; the sites are now occupied by a housing development and modern industrial estate respectively. Administratively, Westburn is within the Cambuslang East ward of the South Lanarkshire Council area and has a population of around 2,000.

== Location ==
Due to its physical isolation from the main built-up areas of Cambuslang, Westburn has something of a rural village character as opposed to a neighbourhood in a medium-sized town.

The River Clyde runs to the north of the village, opposite the Carmyle district of Glasgow – for about two decades the banks were connected by Westburn Viaduct, a disused rail bridge, but this was later blocked off (in 2021, plans to refurbish and re-open the bridge were published). To the south is the West Coast Main Line railway line with the district of Halfway beyond. To the east, Westburn is separated from the neighbouring district of Newton by a small burn and hill. To the west, a park and golf course form a boundary with the Circuit neighbourhood and the Cambuslang town centre.

== History ==
=== Ancient Estate ===
The Westburn name has appeared on local maps for centuries, but initially this was a country house and a nearby farm closer to Cambuslang Main Street than the current village. The estate of Westburn existed from the Late Middle Ages and was largely in the hands of minor nobility, members of the Clan Hamilton who latterly married into the Clan Dundas. The last Westburn House was built in 1685 but the later owners failed to maintain it well, and in the 1890s it was demolished and a golf course (Cambuslang Golf Club) was laid out in the grounds.

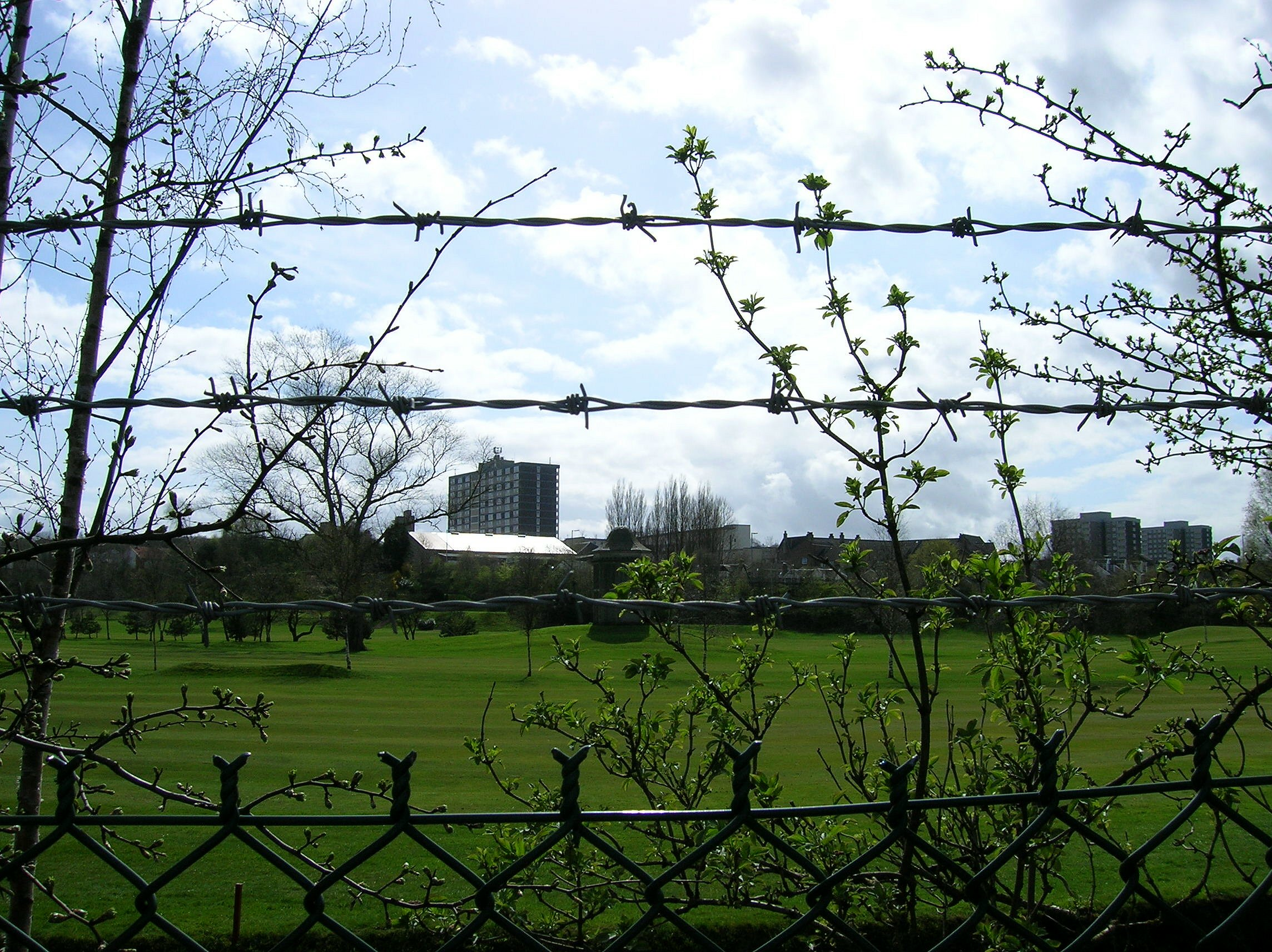
Doocot from Westburn House estate at Cambuslang Golf Club

An octagonal doocot from the 18th century in the middle of the course is the surviving feature of the old estate (and is a Category B listed building). The farm buildings to the east are presently an indoor go-kart racing circuit. Part of the estate which nowadays is housing was a football ground at the end of the 19th century; Westburn Park was home at various times to Cambuslang F.C., Cambuslang Hibernian and the surviving local club Cambuslang Rangers.

Prior to the Industrial Revolution, the area where modern Westburn is now situated was merely open ground with a small road running down towards Newton House on the other side of the burn.

=== 19th century ===
A notable feature in the area was the local cemetery located on high ground, which still serves the Cambuslang population to this day and has been extended several times. It has records from 1889 although there are headstones on the site dating from the 1750s. This was also the location of Old Cambuslang or Cambuslangtown, the hamlet from which the town took its name as it became larger – this settlement did not last beyond the 19th century.

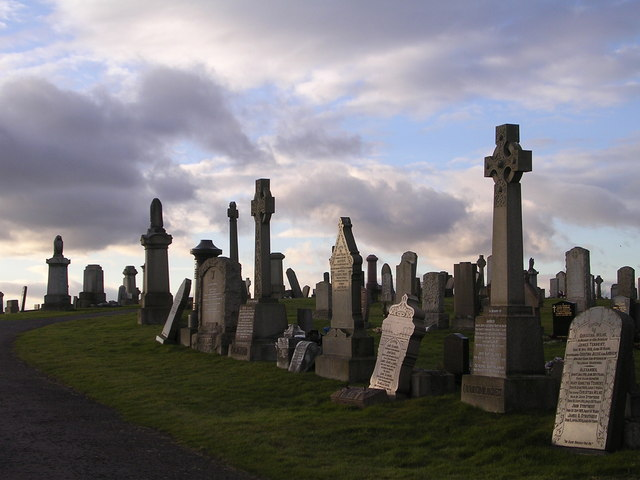
Westburn Cemetery

A small colliery operated in Westburn from 1875 until 1905 and had a branch railway connecting it to the main lines. There was also a small tile works in the mid 19th century, and later some row cottages for railway workers and a public house were built near to Newton railway station and the Hallside Steelworks on the other side of the railway tracks. One of the oldest surviving buildings in the district housed a small cinema ('The Empire') for a time; it has long since been converted to use as a workshop.

=== Steel Village ===
Westburn was transformed with the arrival of its own steel works in 1921. The Redpath Brown & Co firm was established in 1802 in Edinburgh and had premises in Glasgow by 1905 but needed a bigger site and identified Westburn, on the road to Newton House as the location for their new works. The business proved very successful, and a network of houses (around 160 dwellings, mainly cottage flats) was built alongside for the workers. A group of uncommon black 'Swedish timber' houses (64 dwellings) was also constructed on the south side of Westburn Road up to the railway lines in the late 1930s; the same style can be seen in pockets of similar numbers within Lanarkshire including at High Blantyre, Larkhall, Allanton, Moodiesburn and Birkenshaw, while other less distinctive examples using the materials are found in many parts of Scotland.

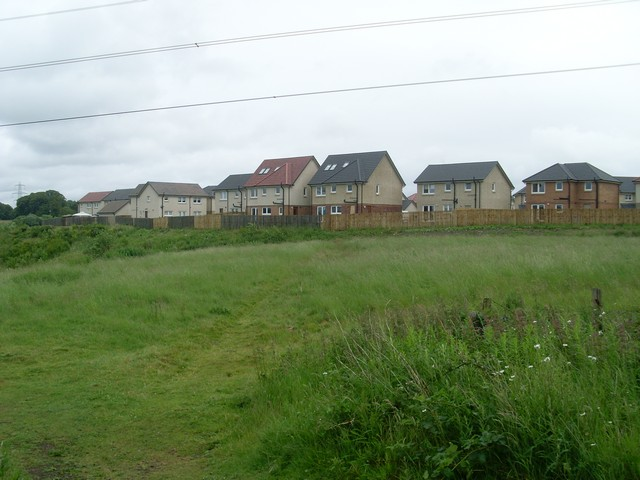
Housing at Westfarm on the site of the steel works

Redpath Brown & Co were acquired by ironmaking giant Bolckow, Vaughan which was the driving force in the growth of Middlesbrough but they soon ran into difficulties and was bought over by another firm from that area, Dorman Long; the Redpath Brown works at Westburn was well suited to their speciality of bridge building (including Sydney Harbour Bridge). After building landing craft duggin World War II, in 1967 the group became part of British Steel Corporation and was renamed Redpath Dorman Long Ltd, later Redpath Engineering Ltd.

The residential portion of Westburn had expanded further – comprising around 120 family homes – by the time the works ceased operations in 1990, with the resultant job losses leading to considerable financial hardship in the community. The fact that the other major employers in the local area, the larger Hallside Steelworks (1873 to 1979) and the Clydesmill Power Station (1903 to 1982) had also folded in the recent past did not help matters. The power station had been built on the river at an old mill weir (traces of which are still visible) and at one point had the largest generating capacity in Scotland.

Westburn was also the scene of a tragedy in 1991 when the Newton rail accident occurred on the tracks right next to the village. The site of the steelworks is now a suburban housing estate – Westfarm or Newton Grange (around 250 dwellings), built between 2004 and 2009. The old colliery was also converted to modern housing (Overton Grange, around 230 dwellings with its streets named after local metalworking firms including Redpath, Arrol, Colville and Dalzell).

== Westburn Today ==
Like many former industrial locations across Scotland, in the 21st century the people of Westburn are attempting to maintain and modernise their community in the face of economic challenges. The 2016 Scottish index of multiple deprivation results suggested those living in the older part of the district were still struggling in some ways after a generation of underemployment. The new affluent housing estates in the area (and in neighbouring Newton Farm) have been designed with homeowners commuting to work in central Glasgow or elsewhere in mind, due to the proximity of the M74 Motorway (five minutes by car) and Newton station (ten minutes on foot).

The secluded area around the footbridge to Newton was a congregating point for local youths for many years, with antisocial behaviour often resulting - this continued after the surrounding land was dug up and fenced off for housebuilding as part of the Newton Farm CGA project, and after public gatherings were banned during the COVID-19 pandemic in Scotland.

=== Amenities ===
Westburn has some recreational provision; a children's play area is located in the east of the village (on the site of the old row cottages) adjacent to the local community hall where birthday parties, dance classes etc could be booked; the hall was damaged by flooding in 2020 and had still not re-opened by the end of 2025, at which time it had been placed up for sale by the local authority. There are other small play areas in the new housing estates, and a full-size grass football pitch at Peter Brownlee Park which is well used by children's teams (an adjacent red blaes pitch is not in use although it has floodlights and some perimeter fencing).

The Clyde Walkway runs alongside the river to the north of Westburn, although at that point it is simply a muddy track, and National Cycle Route 75 runs through the south side of the village offering a safe bicycle route towards Glasgow (it is less safe in the other direction towards Uddingston which involves busy country roads with some inclines and blind bends). The Scotkart facility is also nearby, albeit this is an expensive hobby – a popular informal alternative in the area is the riding of quad and motocross bikes through the nearby fields.

Other amenities are somewhat lacking in the village. There are no schools or nurseries (there is a facility known as Westburn Nursery, but this is actually in the Circuit neighbourhood closer to central Cambuslang); however a large nondenominational primary school and nursery in Newton opened in 2017, and a standalone nursery in that area, Millburn ELC, opened in late 2020. The local Catholic school, St Charles' Primary, is also in Newton.

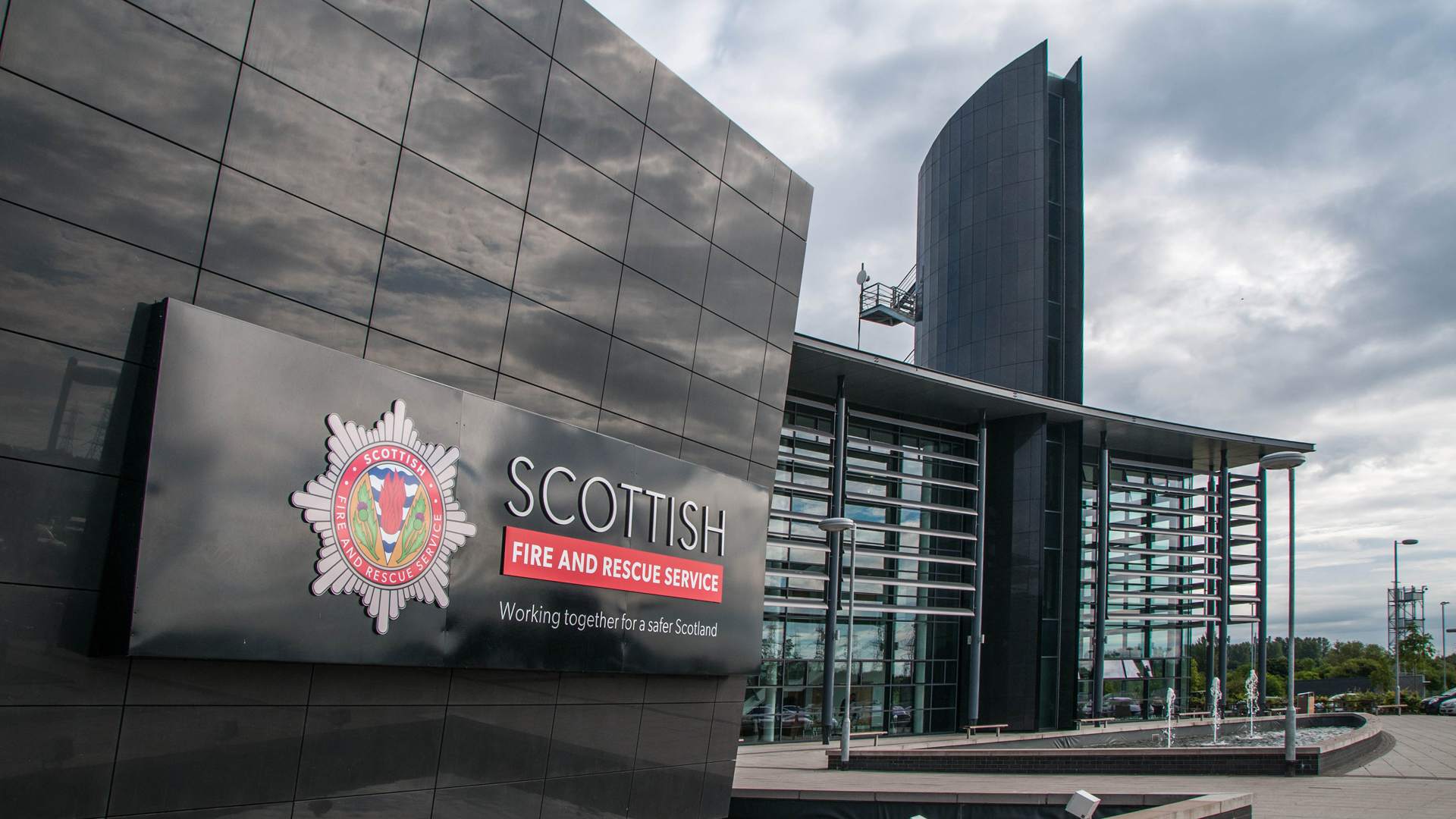
Scottish Fire and Rescue Service National Training Centre

There are no local healthcare facilities, no places of worship and just one licensed grocer incorporating a post office by way of shops. Its location on the south side of the main road through the district (while most residents live on the north side) was also a concern in the community as children and the elderly put themselves at risk trying to cross against speeding vehicles – the road had no pedestrian crossing or other traffic calming measures in place and the road became increasingly busier in recent years due to new housing in Newton and Drumsagard Village. After a concerted effort by local residents over several years, a pelican crossing was installed outside the grocer in mid-2019.

The small public house from the 19th century survived in various hands until 2016 when it closed awaiting redevelopment, being converted into a fast food takeaway the following year. Another old pub still operates in Newton, but most facilities are located in central Cambuslang and Halfway.

=== Commerce ===
There is a modern industrial estate near Westburn at the site of the former power station. It is home to the Scottish headquarters of Greggs bakers who moved there from Shawfield, Rutherglen in 2007; the national training centre for the Scottish Fire and Rescue Service alongside a new community fire station; chemical distributors Brenntag; plant hire firm AB2000; Mitchell Engineering which is one of Cambuslang's oldest surviving businesses (established 1891); and poultry processing company 2 Sisters Food Group which ceased operations at Westburn in 2018 with the loss of 450 jobs.

The development adjoins a larger industrial suburb on the north bank of the Clyde, based near Carmyle around the site of the historic Clyde Iron Works; it is a popular location for businesses due to its proximity to the motorway and to Glasgow.
