= Macabre Case of Prom Pi Ram =

- Film poster
- Thai: คืนบาป พรหมพิราม
- Directed by: Manop Udomdej
- Written by: Manop Udomdej
- Based on: Prom Pi Lab by Natee Sitandon
- Produced by: Chatrichalerm Yukol
- Starring: Kamol Sirithranon; Sompob Benjathikul; Pimpan Chalaikupp; Rachanu Boonchuduang
- Cinematography: Anupap Buachand
- Edited by: Patamanadda Yukol
- Music by: Richard Harvey
- Production company: Prommitr International Production
- Distributed by: Sahamongkol Film International
- Release date: 25 July 2003
- Running time: 117 minutes
- Country: Thailand
- Language: Thai

Macabre Case of Prom Pi Ram (Thai: คืนบาป พรหมพิราม or Keunbab Prompiram) is a 2003 Thai murder investigation crime film directed and written by Manop Udomdej. Its storyline is based on the real-life rape and murder of a 20-year-old anonymous young woman.

== Plot ==
Film begins with rookie cop Pol.Sub.Lt. Saksit writing a memo about events of the year before, when he was first stationed at the hick town of Prom Pi Ram. Intro hints at some disturbance during a celebration in honor of a local government official, and next morning the bloodied, violated body of an unknown girl is found beside a railroad track. Only clue to her identity is a brown paper bag from a store in another town.

Saksit and his scrupulously honest supervisor, Pol.Lt.Col. Phitak Suprapdit identify the victim as Samnian, an abandoned wife who decided to catch a train upcountry to be reunited with her husband in the northern town of Uttaradit. Mid-trip, she was kicked off the train for not having a ticket and left stranded at Prom Pi Ram train station.

The investigation is presented as a series of police interviews, with the first of many flashbacks provided by the station master who took pity on her. Subsequently, Samnian was spotted by some local hoodlums, among whom was a son of henchman of the influential local member of parliament. In the interviews, Phitak bluffs each suspect and allows them to incriminate each other, until the grisly truth is revealed and the guilty party tracked down.

== Cast ==
- Kamol Sirithranon as Saksit
- Sompob Benjathikul as Phitak Suprapdit
- Pimpan Chalaikupp as Samnian
- Rachanu Boonchuduang as Phitak's wife (guest)

== Music ==
=== Track listing ===
The film's score soundtracks were composed and produced by Richard Harvey.

1. "Prom Piram" – 2:15
2. "In The Cornfield" – 2:25
3. "Destiny Train" – 3:15
4. "The Truck Driver's Story" – 2:27
5. "The Fateful Railway" – 3:23
6. "Bicycle Chase" – 2:21
7. "By The River" – 2:05
8. "Lines Of Enquiry" – 2:09
9. "Word Gets Around" – 2:44
10. "The Watcher" – 3:40
11. "Descent Into Evil" – 3:47
12. "What's Happening Here" – 1:54
13. "Crack In The Wall" – 2:38
14. "Given The Runaround" – 2:35
15. "Death Hunt" – 2:55
16. "The Round-Up" – 2:46
17. "Animal Instincts" – 2:35
18. "Final Moments" – 2:04
19. "Closure" (end title) – 4:50

== Background & controversy ==
Macabre Case of Prom Pi Ram is a dramatization on a true crime that took place in a rural hamlet known as Prom Pi Ram (alternatively spelled Prompiram or Phrom Phiram — northwest part of Phitsanulok province in upper central Thailand) between July and August 1977, when the unidentified young woman's corpse is found abnormally by the railroad tracks. It was a very scandalous case when it was discovered that it was true. The victim was a mentally ill woman who was raped by as many as 30 men in Prom Pi Ram and strangled her to death, then put her body on the track for the train to crush to disguise the case.

Later, the story of this case was inspired to become Prom Pi Lab (พรหมพิลาป; "the lamenting Phra Phrom" — while the real name of Prom Pi Ram mean "the idyllic town of Phra Phrom"), a novel by an experienced author and journalist Santi Svetavimala (under the pen name Natee Sitandon).

The film was shot mainly on location in Uthai Thani without filming in Phitsanulok, the actual crime scene to avoid conflicts.

When it will be released there has been some controversy. The Prom Pi Ram residents protested the use of the film's title Khonbab Prompiram (คนบาป พรหมพิราม; "the sin people of Prom Pi Ram"), owing they claimed that it would make society look at the Prom Pi Ram people as a bad person. Finally there was a mediation where the filmmaker changed the title to Keunbab Prompiram (คืนบาป พรหมพิราม; "the night of sins in Prom Pi Ram").

== Awards and nominations ==
Award	Category	Recipient(s)	Result
13th Thailand National Film Association Awards	Best Picture	Macabre Case of Prom Pi Ram	Won
13th Thailand National Film Association Awards	Best Director	Manop Udomdej	Nominated
13th Thailand National Film Association Awards	Best Actress	Pimpan Chalaikupp	Won
13th Thailand National Film Association Awards	Best Supporting Actor	Sompob Benjathikul	Nominated
13th Thailand National Film Association Awards	Best Screenplay	Manop Udomdej	Won
13th Thailand National Film Association Awards	Best Editing	Patamanadda Yukol	Won
13th Thailand National Film Association Awards	Best Original Score	Richard Harvey	Won
13th Thailand National Film Association Awards	Best Sound Editing and Mixing	Chiyachet Sethi and Preethep Boondej	Nominated
13th Thailand National Film Association Awards	Best Costume Design	Sukanya Maruangpradit	Nominated
12th Bangkok Critics Assembly Awards	Best Film	Macabre Case of Prom Pi Ram	Nominated
12th Bangkok Critics Assembly Awards	Best Director	Manop Udomdej	Nominated
12th Bangkok Critics Assembly Awards	Best Actor	Sompob Benjathikul	Nominated
12th Bangkok Critics Assembly Awards	Best Actress	Pimpan Chalaikupp	Nominated
12th Bangkok Critics Assembly Awards	Best Screenplay	Manop Udomdej	Nominated
12th Bangkok Critics Assembly Awards	Best Cinematography	Anupap Buachand	Nominated
12th Bangkok Critics Assembly Awards	Best Editing	Patamanadda Yukol	Won
12th Bangkok Critics Assembly Awards	Best Original Score	Richard Harvey	Won
