= Death of a President (2006 film) =

- Directed by: Gabriel Range
- Written by: Gabriel Range; Simon Finch
- Produced by: Gabriel Range; Simon Finch; Ed Guiney; Robin Gutch
- Starring: Hend Ayoub; Brian Boland; Becky Ann Baker
- Cinematography: Graham Smith
- Edited by: Brand Thumim
- Music by: Richard Harvey
- Production companies: FilmFour; Borough Films
- Distributed by: Optimum Releasing
- Release dates: 10 September 2006 (Toronto Film Festival); 9 October 2006 (United Kingdom)
- Running time: 93 minutes
- Country: United Kingdom
- Languages: English, Arabic
- Budget: $2 million
- Box office: $869,352

Death of a President is a 2006 British mockumentary political thriller film about the fictional assassination of George W. Bush, the 43rd and at the time, incumbent U.S. president, on 19 October 2007 in Chicago, Illinois. The film is presented as a future history docudrama and uses actors, archival video footage as well as computer-generated special effects to present the hypothetical aftermath the event had on civil liberties, racial profiling, journalistic sensationalism and foreign policy.

== Plot ==
Broadcast in the year 2008, the film is presented in a TV documentary style format, combining talking head interviews, news coverage clips and video surveillance footage surrounding the assassination of U.S. president George W. Bush in Chicago around a year earlier on 19 October 2007. The president is fatally shot by a sniper after he addresses an economic forum at the Chicago Sheraton Hotel, before which an anti-war rally had taken place. News outlets immediately begin reporting on the incident along with its political ramifications. After authorities earlier arrest and interrogate war-protesting detainees, Jamal Abu Zikri (Malik Bader), an IT professional of Syrian origin, becomes the prime suspect.

Vice President Dick Cheney, now president, uses the possible al-Qaeda relationship in connection with the suspected assassin, Zikri, to push his own domestic political security agenda. He calls for the legislation of PATRIOT Act III, trying to increase the investigative powers of the FBI, the police, and other government agencies over American citizens and foreign residents as he contemplates attacking Syria.

As his wife Zahra (Hend Ayoub) listens to the verdict with family attorney Dawn Norton (Patricia Buckley) in a packed courtroom, Zikri is convicted of killing the U.S. president and sentenced to death based upon dubious forensic evidence. Meanwhile, a new report which surfaces, substantiated by interviews with Marianne Claybon (Chavez Ravine), indicates that the perpetrator is most likely her husband Al Claybon (Tony Dale), a veteran of the 1991 Persian Gulf War, who lived in Rock Island, Illinois, and who also was the father of David Claybon, a U.S. soldier recently killed in the Iraq War. The assassin, who blames President Bush for the death of his son, killed himself after Bush's assassination. Claybon's suicide note, addressed to a second son, Casey Claybon (Neko Parham), an Iraq War veteran living in Chicago who was previously considered as a suspect, reads:

Everything I stood for and raised you to stand for has turned bad. There's no honor in dying for an immoral cause. For lies. I love my country, but I love God, and the sons He gave me even more. I must do the right thing by you and by David. George Bush killed our David, and I cannot forgive him for that.

Ten months after President Bush's assassination, Zikri remains on death row at the Stateville Correctional Center, because government officials are deliberately delaying his legal appeal. Moreover, in his dead father's Rock Island house, Casey Claybon finds evidence of his father's planning of the shooting. The most incriminating piece of evidence is a copy of a top secret presidential itinerary outlining, to the minute, President Bush's Chicago whereabouts on 19 October 2007. The news report ends while the U.S. Government continues investigating how presidential assassin Al Claybon obtained that top secret document.

The final closing titles of the film inform the viewer that President Cheney's USA PATRIOT Act III was signed into permanent law in the U.S., stating the following: "It has granted investigators unprecedented powers of detention and surveillance, and further expanded the powers of the executive branch".

== Cast ==
- Hend Ayoub as Zahra Abu Zikri, the wife of convicted assassin Jamal Abu Zikri. She comes to believe her family has been targeted by authorities due to their Middle-Eastern heritage.
- Brian Boland as Larry Stafford, lead Secret Service agent assigned to the president. He ultimately failed in preventing the president from being assassinated, as he discusses the day's events and security precautions leading up to the tragedy.
- Becky Ann Baker as Eleanor Drake, personal advisor to the president. She dutifully assisted in preparing his speeches and was one of the first few people to learn of his death at the hospital.
- Robert Mangiardi as Greg Turner, First Deputy of the Chicago police department, in charge of coordinating security arrangements for the war protest as well as handling the blocking off of city streets for the presidential motorcade. He expresses his displeasure with the violent tone of the protesting public.
- Jay Patterson as Sam McCarthy, White House correspondent for The Washington Post. From time to time, he expresses his disapproval with the government's basis for holding Zikri. He believes they have no definitive evidence linking him to the assassination other than the fact that he might have flirted with the thought of terrorism by visiting an enemy country.
- Jay Whittaker as Frank Molini, a war protester caught and arrested by police in the ensuing chaos after the initial shots were fired at the president. In his possession was a banner depicting a gun being fired at Bush. However, he was later found not to be the assassin.
- Michael Reilly Burke as Robert H. Maguire, special agent in charge at the FBI, involved with reporting directly to new president Dick Cheney on his investigation surrounding evidence related to the assassination.
- James Urbaniak as Dr. James Pearn, an FBI forensic examiner assigned to the case to collect and catalogue evidence against any possible suspects. He obtains a partial fingerprint of Jamal Abu Zikri from traces of gunshot residue at the crime scene, but notes that it is only associative evidence and not necessarily enough evidence for a conviction in a court of law.
- Neko Parham as Casey Claybon, son of possible suspected assassin Al Claybon. A war veteran who did not particularly support Bush, but who also claimed to have no knowledge of the assassination. He was initially arrested in the melee following the killing, as he walked through the streets of downtown Chicago looking for employment.
- Seena Jon as Samir Masri, a Yemeni American protesting at the war rally outside where the President was speaking. Members of his family were deported back to Yemen after overstaying their travel visas following the 9/11 attacks. Masri was at the rally to protest Bush's policies and was arrested as a suspect.
- Christian Stolte as John Rucinski, FBI investigator with the joint terrorism task force, assigned with interviewing detainees including Jamal Abu Zikri. Skeptical, he stresses his suspicions about Zikri's whereabouts on the day of the assassination as well as his military history after analysing his statements.
- Chavez Ravine as Marianne Claybon, wife of suspected possible assassin Al Claybon. She finds it hard to comprehend her patriotic husband could have had any connection with the killing.
- Patricia Buckley as Dawn Norton, Jamal Abu Zikry's defence attorney. She immediately expresses her challenging task of defending her client who the FBI believes has connections with terrorist organisations. She relates her difficulty by conveying that any person suspected of involvement with Al-Qaeda unfortunately equates to a guilty verdict in American society.
- Malik Bader as Jamal Abu Zikri, the suspected assassin, a Syrian national working at an IT firm in a building neighbouring the Chicago Sheraton. He was convicted of the crime, but appealed the verdict while being held on death row due to minor forensic evidence implicating him in the assassination.
- Tony Dale as Al Claybon, the figure cited as a strong likely suspect of the assassination who ended up committing suicide after he supposedly killed the president. He was a Gulf War veteran distraught over a second son's death from the Iraq War, blaming Bush for his misery.

== Production ==
=== Filming ===
The funeral scenes in the film include footage taken from archival coverage of Ronald Reagan's funeral, and President Cheney's eulogy for President Bush is a news clip of Cheney's eulogy for Reagan. CGI special effects and existing footage of President Bush helped to re-create the filming of his assassination. The rifle used by the perpetrator in the film was actually an airsoft replica of an AR-15. Image editing software was used to add the actors' images to photographs with President Bush.

Although all imagery related to Bush's assassination was created using digital special effects, an apparent actual death, captured on tape, is included in the film during a piece of war footage in which an Iraqi insurgent prepares to launch a rocket, but is shot in the head first. Except for specific scenes, most of the actors portrayed in the film were not told of the premise surrounding the story.

During a post emergency surgery news conference, the chief physician's comment that he had "never seen such a strong heart in a man of the president's age", is a reference to President Ronald Reagan's own attempted assassination. In addition, the interview of a middle-aged African American outside the hospital recalls an interview of a witness on the streets of Washington, D.C. in 1981 following that assassination attempt. Filming was done entirely on location in Chicago, Illinois.

=== Music ===
The film score was composed and conducted by Richard Harvey. Sound effects and music elements were mixed by Alex Riordan.

=== Director's notes ===
The film's director, Gabriel Range, stated that the film was not "a leftist jeremiad" and further said:

The purpose of the film was not to imagine how the world stage would reset with the assassination of George Bush. The intent of the film is really to use the assassination of President Bush as a dramatic device—using the future as an allegory to comment on the past. [....] If people go to the cinema expecting to have some great moment of catharsis watching the president being shot, I suspect they're in for a pretty big surprise. I think that anyone who's expecting this to be a liberal wet dream is in for quite a shock ... It was very important that the film was not a political rant. It was not just a condemnation or polemic because I think that polemics are easy to dismiss.

== Release ==
The official premiere was at the 2006 Toronto International Film Festival on 10 September 2006.

=== Television ===
In Europe, it was broadcast in the UK on 9 October (More4), 19 October 2006 (Channel 4), in Finland on 18 October 2007, in Switzerland on 21 August 2011 (SF 1) and in France on 28 January 2014 (Polar)

=== Box office ===
Newmarket paid one million dollars for the U.S. distribution rights. The total production budget for the film is estimated to have been two million dollars. Two of the largest U.S. cinema chains, Regal Entertainment Group and Cinemark, refused to screen the film; a Cinemark spokesman told UK newspaper The Guardian: "The assassination of a sitting president is problematic subject matter". In addition, major U.S. broadcasters CNN and National Public Radio refused to broadcast advertisements for the film. The film was screened in the U.S. for 14 days, showing at 143 theatres at its widest release. Worldwide, it grossed $869,352. The Japanese motion picture ethics committee, the Eirin, prevented Death of a President from being shown in most cinemas in 2007, saying that the film's Japanese title ("Bush Ansatsu", translated as "Bush Assassinated") is inappropriate. The film was scheduled to begin showing in Japanese cinemas on 6 October 2007.

=== Home media ===
The Region 2 Code widescreen edition of the film was released on DVD in the United Kingdom on 30 October 2006, followed by the Region 1 Code version in the United States on 3 April 2007. Special features include interviews and commentary with screenwriter Simon Finch, editor Brand Thumim, line producer Donall McCusker and director Gabriel Range. A theatrical trailer is also included with the extras.

== Reception ==
=== Politicians ===
The central conceit of Death of a President was much criticised by those who believed it exploited the subject of presidential assassination, and that by doing so, was in bad taste. Gretchen Esell of the Texas Republican Party described the subject matter saying, "I find this shocking, I find it disturbing. I don't know if there are many people in America who would want to watch something like that." Hillary Clinton, then junior United States senator from New York, told The Journal News of Rockland, Westchester, and Putnam counties at the annual New Castle Community Day in Chappaqua that, "I think it's despicable. I think it's absolutely outrageous. That anyone would even attempt to profit on such a horrible scenario makes me sick."

Simon Finch, the co-screenwriter, replied saying that Clinton had not seen the film when she commented. The Bush administration did not comment about the film; as White House spokesperson Emily Lawrimore remarked, "We are not commenting because it doesn't dignify a response."

=== Media and theater reaction ===
Following its release in Canada and the United Kingdom, many American movie theater chains including AMC, Regal, and Cinemark refused to run the controversial feature due to its depiction of Bush's potential assassination. Dick Westerling, who ran the Regal chain, remarked that "we do not feel it is appropriate to portray the future assassination of a president". At the same time, CNN and the National Public Radio announced that neither network would accept commercials for the film due to its extreme nature.

=== Critical review ===
Critics had varied opinions about Death of a President. The Metacritic aggregate website rated it at 49, "Mixed or Average", based upon 30 reviews. Rotten Tomatoes rated it at 40%, "Rotten", based upon 101 reviews. The website's consensus reads, "In this unconvincing fictional documentary, the tense 30 minutes that lead into the title event is outweighed by the boring, melodramatic hour preceding it." In Time magazine, Richard Corliss placed it in the context of other fictional assassinations, such as The Assassination of the Duke of Guise (1908), Suddenly (1954) and television programmes like 24 (2001–2014); concluding that it was "not an incendiary documentary, but a well-made political thriller." In the Village Voice, J. Hoberman said it was "dramatically inert, but a minor techno-miracle" and that it "skews more theoretical than sensationalist ... Bush is presented as a martyr." James Berardinelli commented that "If this was a serious examination of the possible long-term ramifications of George Bush's current foreign policy, or if it had anything interesting to say about Bush's legacy, it might be justifiable. But that's not the case. The decision to use Bush rather than a fictional representation of him is for no reason other than self-promotion."

Of the critics who liked Death of a President, Rex Reed of The New York Observer identified the film as "Clever, thoughtful, and totally believable. This is a film without a political agenda that everyone should see." In the Toronto Star, Peter Howell said, "The film's deeper intentions ... elevate it into the company of such landmark works of historical argument as Peter Watkins's The War Game, Costa-Gavras's Z and, closer to home, Michel Brault's Les Ordres. Every thinking person should see Death of a President." In Film Journal International, Frank Lovece mused that the film's condemnation "by politicians and pundits from James Pinkerton to Hillary Clinton is understandable and completely predictable: They can't not comment, so when they do, they have to play to their audiences. None of them seriously believes that this work of fiction will really make someone take a potshot at the president, and anyway, the attempt on President Ronald Reagan's life came out of a crazy guy's fascination with Jodie Foster, so you may as well decry movies starring blonde former child actresses." Jim Emerson, editor of RogerEbert.com exclaimed, "Death of a President is electrifying drama, and compellingly realistic. The actors chosen for interview segments (including the mom from Freaks & Geeks as a presidential speechwriter) are unerringly authentic as real people, speaking spontaneously before a documentary lens -- even when it's clear they've rehearsed in their heads what they're going to say, and may even have told these same stories any number of times before."

The film was compared to The Interview following that movie's release in 2014. The Prince George Citizen columnist Neil Godbout called it "a powerful statement about racial prejudice, [politicians' exploitation on] events for their own purposes, and [reporters' willingness] to tell stories [told] by government sources without question to get the scoop and break the story first." Indiewire critic Andre Seewood wrote that the film does not "suggest that [George W. Bush] actually be assassinated by British agents." Seewood further wrote that it is "not a direct insult to an enemy but hypothetical criticism of [UK's] ally cleverly disguised as a television news journal in countries where freedom of speech is mutually respected."

=== Awards ===
The film won a total of 6 awards including; the International Critics Prize (FIPRESCI) from the 2006 Toronto Film Festival, the International Emmy Award for the TV Movie/Mini-Series category in the (UK), the RTS Television Award in the Digital Channel Programme category from the Royal Television Society, the RTBF TV Prize for Best Picture Award from the Brussels European Film Festival for director Gabriel Range, the Banff Rockie Award from the Banff Television Festival for the film, and one for director Gabriel Range. The film also received a nomination for Best Visual Effects from the British Academy TV Awards in 2007.

== See also ==
- Assassinations in fiction
