= The Day Britain Stopped =

2003 British pseudo-documentary

- Genre: Drama; Docufiction; Pseudo-documentary
- Written by: Simon Finch; Gabriel Range
- Directed by: Gabriel Range
- Narrated by: Tim Pigott-Smith
- Composer: Alan O'Duffy
- Country of origin: United Kingdom
- Original language: English

Production
- Executive producers: Peter Horrocks; Leanne Klein
- Producer: Simon Finch
- Editors: Horacio Queiro; Simon Greenwood
- Running time: 90 minutes

Original release
- Network: BBC Two
- Release: 13 May 2003

Related
- The Man Who Broke Britain; Heatwave

The Day Britain Stopped is a dramatic pseudo-documentary produced by Wall to Wall Media for the BBC. It depicts a fictional disaster on 19 December 2003, in which a train strike is the first in a chain of events that lead to a fatal meltdown of Britain's transport system. Directed by Gabriel Range, who wrote the script with producer Simon Finch, the film first aired on Tuesday, 13 May 2003, on BBC Two.

The drama makes use of various British television news services and newsreaders (such as Sky News and Channel 4 News), foreign news channels (such as France's TF1), radio stations (BBC Radio 5 Live), real-life archival footage (from a train crash site, a speech by Prime Minister Tony Blair and various stock footage of British traffic congestion) and cameo roles by well-known British personalities. Accompanying music includes excerpts from the film soundtracks of The Shawshank Redemption, The Sum of All Fears, Requiem for a Dream, Heat, and 28 Days Later.

== Plot ==
In December 2003, 18 months after the Potters Bar rail accident, a fatal train accident near Waverley in Edinburgh leads the ASLEF and RMT trade unions to declare a strike for 19 December on safety grounds, forcing the heavy Christmas rail passenger traffic to use the roads instead.

On 19 December, a crossover accident on the M25 motorway closes the motorway in both directions, blocking access to the M23 and Gatwick Airport. A diversion is opened, but a lack of coordination between the Highways Agency and Surrey Police means that the route is quickly gridlocked due to ongoing roadworks. A chemical tanker jackknifes and overturns near Heathrow Airport, completely paralysing the southern half of the M25. The first death occurs when an ambulance carrying a patient critically injured by the first accident runs out of medicine. Following the two accidents, a cascading failure of the motorway network takes place, resulting in gridlock conditions across the country.

British airspace runs over capacity, forcing air traffic controllers to work double and triple shifts. Jerry Newell - a pilot for British Airways - decides to walk to Heathrow, where he is to captain a flight to Toulouse. Birmingham and Manchester are rendered unreachable by road, causing a planned friendly match between Turkey and England at Old Trafford to be delayed, then cancelled due to low attendance.

Julian Galt, his wife and two children are driving to Heathrow for a Christmas holiday in Bilbao, and end up trapped on the M25. Trapped drivers try to flee the area, but are aggressively pursued and forced to turn back by motorcycle officers of the Thames Valley Police. As night falls, Julian's wife convinces him to lead her and the children off the motorway to Heathrow. They sneak off the motorway to the airport's perimeter road and flag down a passing minibus, but Julian stays behind. The freezing temperatures become deadly as motorists succumb to hypothermia. In an attempt to gain control of the crisis, the government initiates 'Operation Gridlock', a contingency plan for trapped motorists to leave the motorways on foot and make their way to field hospitals for triage.

In Heathrow's control tower, air traffic controller Nicola Evans volunteers to work late when her replacement fails to arrive. Overworked, she accidentally directs an Aer Lingus flight to taxi onto a runway which is about to be landed on by a Czech Airlines cargo flight. Conflicting instructions are given by the other controllers. Evans issues a go-around to the cargo plane, which avoids the Aer Lingus plane but collides with the departing British Airways flight to Bilbao, killing everyone on both planes instantly. Burning wreckage falls across Hounslow, destroying swathes of the town and starting massive fires. Heathrow shuts down, followed by the rest of the UK's airspace shortly thereafter.

Jane, Jerry Newell's wife, manages to make it to her home in Shepperton, sees news of the air crash on the television, and tries to find out her husband's whereabouts. She is briefly calmed when she learns that Jerry was not scheduled to captain the flight involved in the disaster, but then receives a phone call from British Airways, telling her that Jerry's flight to Toulouse was cancelled, and he was reassigned to the doomed flight, dying in the crash. Julian's family also perished in the disaster, as they reached the airport in time to board the flight.

In the wake of the disaster, Nicola Evans and her colleagues are charged with multiple manslaughter. However, the case against them collapses when the investigation into the disaster finds that systemic failures in Britain's air traffic control were to blame. The final death toll of the air crash is 87: 64 passengers and crew, and 23 people on the ground. There were also five deaths from hypothermia on the motorways, and eight other deaths.

== Cast ==
- Eric Carte as Tom Walker
- Andy Shield as Inspector Clive Turner
- Steve North as Julian Galt
- Angelo Andreou as Tomas Galt
- Emma Pinto as Ana Galt
- Olivia MacDonald as Marina Galt
- Prue Clarke as Pauline Watkins
- Jonathan Linsley as PC Tony Foster
- Tony Longhurst as Steve Thomas
- David Holt as Dominic Steel
- Joanna Griffiths as Nicola Evans
- Alison Skot as Air Traffic Controller
- Daniel Copeland as Matt Ogden
- Nancy McClean as Jane Newell
- Rebekah Janes as a concerned woman
- Satnam Bhogal as Inesh Gunwadena
- Tim Crouch as Daniel Boyd
- Julie Wilson Nimmo as TV phone witness (uncredited)

Tim Pigott-Smith provided the narration. Katie Derham, Charlotte Green, Philip Hayton, John Humphrys, Gary Lineker, Anna Rajan, Jon Snow and Kirsty Young appeared as themselves.

Archive footage of Prime Minister Tony Blair was used, combining parts of his statements in the House of Commons about Air France Flight 4590 and the Great Heck rail crash.

== Production ==
The M96 motorway, a converted airfield used by the Fire Service College for training, was used as a stage for the M25.

Director Gabriel Range explains how he and the production team went about realistically recreating the disaster:

During September 11, there were some incredibly powerful telephone interviews from eyewitnesses right at the centre of the disaster on both TV and radio. They are the simplest way for a rolling news channel to keep their audience up to date – but they offer an incredible immediacy. [...] For the aftermath of the collision, we focused on just a few streets, placing a specially constructed fuselage at the end of a narrow terraced street. Using a combination of home video, fire service video and news footage, we were able to recreate the chaos that would follow such a disaster. But the key to creating an impression of scale was the combination of our own footage with carefully chosen archive and computer-generated images.

== Reception ==
Radio Times called the film: "Scarily realistic ... so plausibly done that it should really have a warning flash in the corner of the screen saying 'fiction' in big red letters. ... It works as a smart riveting drama and also as a warning of the power of the financial markets". A reviewer in The Guardian wrote that it was "an excellent and horrible film ... Indeed, if there was anything that betrayed the fictional nature of The Day Britain Stopped, it was its craftedness and lack of sensationalism."

In response to the programme's original broadcast, the following statement was issued by National Air Traffic Services:

National Air Traffic Services believes that this programme not only fails to portray standard operational procedures accurately, but in doing so, paints an unfair and misleading picture of UK air traffic operations. In particular, there is no mention that the two aircraft involved in this fictitious incident would have been fitted with on-board collision avoidance systems which, combined with air traffic control's Conflict Alert system, would have prevented the 'accident'. Furthermore, the programme inaccurately portrays Heathrow's standard go-around procedures and the way air traffic controllers at Heathrow communicate with each other and with the West Drayton unit. The programme takes insufficient account of the traffic flow management procedures and ground movement radar systems, and inaccurately portrays the context in which airspace sectors are combined. This programme presents itself as dramatised documentary. However, it is not only based on a highly unlikely scenario, but deliberately ignores – or misrepresents – almost every standard safety system or procedure currently in use. NATA keeps these procedures under constant review and, as a consequence, the UK has maintained its exemplary air safety record despite rising levels of traffic. In our view, this programme is highly inaccurate and needlessly alarmist.

== Projected studio version ==
In 2012, Ridley Scott and Steve Zaillian planned to make a film inspired by The Day Britain Stopped at 20th Century Fox.
