= Phrom Phiram murder case =

1977 Thai crime

- Headline item from Thairath newspaper
- Location: Phrom Phiram district, Phitsanulok Province, Thailand
- Date: July 27, 1977; 49 years ago Around 11.00 PM (UTC+7)
- Attack type: Kidnapping, rape, murder
- Victim: 1
- Assailant: More than 30

Phrom Phiram murder case (1977) was a rape-murder crime case on July 27, 1977, in Phrom Phiram district, Phitsanulok Province in Thailand, in which an unnamed girl was kidnapped, raped, and murdered by more than 30 perpetrators. Initially, Royal Thai Police did not investigate the case and summarily concluded that it was an accident. Only after 20 villagers in the district had contacted journalists before the case was reopened. At the end of the investigation, 30 villagers were found to be perpetrators, but only ten would be convicted while the rest were acquitted due to the lack of evidence.

== Popular culture ==
Film adaptations

- Macabre Case of Prom Pi Ram, a 2003 biographical film directed by Manop Udomdej starring Pimpan Chalaikupp as the unnamed girl.
