= UK Government Decontamination Service =

Organisation within the UK Government

UK Government Decontamination Service

The UK Government Decontamination Service (sometimes written without the UK prefix or abbreviated to GDS) is an organisation within the UK Government that provides advice and guidance to help the UK resist and recover from any deliberate or accidental release of chemical, biological, radiological or nuclear materials (CBRN) or from major accidental releases of hazardous materials (HAZMAT).

GDS was established as an executive agency of the Department for Environment, Food and Rural Affairs (DEFRA) and since 1 April 2009 has been a constituent part of The Food and Environment Research Agency, a newly formed executive agency of the Department for Environment, Food and Rural Affairs (DEFRA). The first, and only, chief executive of the GDS agency was Robert Bettley-Smith FRICS, appointed on the agency's creation in 2005.

While the agency has pointed out that it was not set up due to increased CBRN terrorism in particular, it accepts that the driving force behind the agency's creation was the increased threat the UK faced from terrorism as a whole and the need to strengthen the level of the nation's preparedness across the board.

== History ==
The CBRN Resilience Programme was established in October 2001, as part of the government's Capability Programme, with the main aim of ensuring that, in the event of a terrorist attack, the response from both central and local government and the emergency services would be quick and effective enough to minimise the impact on people, property and the environment. The programme, as well as forums and sub-groups within it, is chaired by the Home Office. Partners and stakeholders in the programme represent bodies throughout local and central government and the public and private sectors. The decision to form the agency was developed through the CBRN Resilience Programme.

Throughout 2003 and 2004, national guidance on the decontamination of both people and the environment was published by DEFRA. In December 2003, a Government-sponsored report on whether the UK needed a national organisation to help in the recovery phase of any accident identified that the need existed. Local authorities had already been responsible for the clean-up in the aftermath of such crises (this responsibility would be set out in the Civil Contingencies Act 2004) and would remain so. The new organisation would exist to aid those efforts, not assume responsibility for them.

In March, 2004, the government announced that it was actively considering setting up a UK-wide service to provide advice to those bodies undertaking decontamination and clean-up after a release, deliberate or accidental, of hazardous materials. In January 2005, the then Minister for the Environment and Agri-environment, Elliot Morley, MP, announced that the government had spent the last year working out the potential costs and benefits of such a service and now intended to set one up. On 21 July 2005, the then Secretary of State, Margaret Beckett MP gave a written statement to the House, announcing the creation of the agency and the appointment of its chief executive. It came into existence on 1 October that year.

Although without any powers itself, the new agency would provide its assistance to the whole of the UK. In Wales, where CBRN resilience remained undevolved, the Welsh Assembly Government was consulted and its support announced. In Scotland, where CBRN policy had been devolved, the Scottish Executive was actively involved in the agency's establishment and provided £250,000 to its formation. Initial funding from other stakeholders included £950,000 from the agency's parent department, DEFRA, and £55,000 from the Northern Ireland Office. DEFRA's contribution was part of £5.22m transferred from the Cabinet Office to fund the research required to set the agency up in the first place.

GDS spent its first few months identifying where in the private sector there lay specialist expertise and experience on which to call in an emergency. Late in 2005, the agency held a stakeholder event where it publicised its 'open for business' status and the fact that it had developed a framework of suppliers of specialist knowledge and skills.

== Role ==
The UK Government Decontamination Service's functions revolve around ensuring that the country is prepared for CBRN and HAZMAT events and can cope efficiently during their aftermath. They do not take responsibility for clean-up or decontamination themselves, rather making sure that those with the responsibility (local authorities, emergency services, other government bodies) have access to the specialist knowledge, skills and equipment they may need to carry out such work. They assess the ability of such specialist private sector companies to carry out decontamination operations and are also available to co-ordinate all parties concerned in the event.

The agency regularly validate and test the contingency arrangements which are in place with local authorities. Through this work, they are able to act as the government's advisor on the state of readiness of the country to face such accidents. They also regularly review gaps in the UK's national capability to respond to them.

The agency exists as a central portal for local authorities and central government, connecting those needing information with those organisations best able to provide it. In general, advice is given by specialist, third-party companies rather than the agency itself.

Despite its name, the GDS is keen to point out that, while recovery and re-occupation of buildings and environments after incidents is part of its responsibility, the more immediate concerns of human decontamination is the remit of the Department of Health and the national health services.

GDS state that one reason they have been set up is that Government has recognised it would not be cost effective to have all local authorities research and maintain the level of expertise required to efficiently respond to a CBRN threat. They state this is also the reason why the service is UK-wide, rather than having the home countries maintain separate services.

== See also ==
- Civil Contingencies Committee
- List of terrorist incidents in the United Kingdom
- Mass decontamination
