= Noflan =

Flame retardant chemical

Noflan is a flame retardant chemical. It was developed in the 1980s by the Moscow State Textile University and the Semenov Institute of Chemical Physics in Moscow, with the aim of fire-proofing the fabric used in Soviet spacecraft. In the 1990s the technology was commercialised and licensed to Firestop Chemicals.

== Composition ==
As halogens and antimony containing flame retardant result in unwanted degradation, alternatives have been under research. Noflan is a complex of the amide of alkylphosphonic acid ammonium salt with ammonium chloride but is also alleged to cause corrosion.

== Uses ==
Noflan is used to treat fabric and carpets in trains, buses and aircraft, including the Airbus A380.

== Gävle straw goat ==
Noflan was used to protect a giant straw yule goat or julbocken from arson in Gävle, Sweden during December 2006.
