= Gabriel Range =

British filmmaker

- Born: Gabriel Edmund Range; United Kingdom
- Occupation: Film director
- Years active: 2002–present

Gabriel Range is a British filmmaker, who is probably best known for his fictional political-documentary about the assassination of George W. Bush in Death of a President.

Range worked in journalism before moving into documentaries and docudrama. In 2003, he wrote and directed The Day Britain Stopped, a feature-length drama told in the style of documentary. The film earned Range a nomination for a British Academy (BAFTA) TV Craft Award for Best New Director and won a Royal Television Society Craft and Design Award.

In 2005, Range wrote and directed Death of a President, which had its debut at the 2006 Toronto International Film Festival. The film won a total of six awards including; the International Critics Prize (FIPRESCI) at Toronto, the International Emmy Award for the TV Movie/Mini-Series category, the RTS Television Award in the Digital Channel Programme category from the Royal Television Society, the RTBF TV Prize for Best Picture Award from the Brussels European Film Festival for director Gabriel Range, the Banff Rockie Award from the Banff Television Festival for the film and one for director Gabriel Range. The film also received a nomination for Best Visual Effects from the British Academy TV Awards in 2007.

Death of a President was distributed by Newmarket Films in the US. Rex Reed of The New York Observer identified the film as "Clever, thoughtful, and totally believable. This is a film without a political agenda that everyone should see."[18] In the Toronto Star, Peter Howell said: "The film's deeper intentions ... elevate it into the company of such landmark works of historical argument as Peter Watkins's The War Game, Costa-Gavras's Z and, closer to home, Michel Brault's Orders (Les Ordres). Every thinking person should see Death of a President." The film has been shown theatrically in more than 40 countries.

Range was identified in Screen International's 2006 "Stars of Tomorrow" which labelled him a 'creator of innovative and convincing drama documentaries...acclaimed for their plausibility, naturalism and integrity.'

In 2009, Range began production on I Am Slave. Written by Jeremy Brock, the screenwriter of The Last King of Scotland and Mrs Brown, and produced by Andrea Calderwood, the film is based on Mende Nazer and Damien Lewis' book Slave. Starring Wunmi Mosaku, Isaach de Bankole, Hiam Abbass and Lubna Azabal, the film had its international premiere at the 2010 Toronto Film Festival. The Hollywood Reporter praised Range's subtle touch, describing the film as "heart-wrenching" and "unexpectedly gripping". Writing in the Daily Telegraph, Josh Prince described it as "a film of jolting accuracy and real emotional clout". The premiere of the film in the United Kingdom was on Channel 4 in 2010, making it eligible for the 2011 BAFTA Television Awards; it was nominated in the Best Single Drama category. I Am Slave also won Best UK Film at the 2010 UK Music Video and Screen Awards and was nominated for a Broadcast Award (Best Single Drama) and a One World Media Award.

== Filmography ==
Film

- The Great Dome Robbery (2002)
- Death of a President (2006)
- I Am Slave (2010)
- Stardust (2020)

TV movie

- The Day Britain Stopped (2003)
- Supersleuths: The Menendez Murders (2003)
- The Man Who Broke Britain (2004)
