= Scottish Fire and Rescue Service National Training Centre =

Coordinates: 55.8266°N 4.1585°W

The Scottish Fire and Rescue Service National Training Centre is a purpose-built training facility in Cambuslang, South Lanarkshire. Also known as the Uaill Training Centre, it has mock buildings and areas suitable for training to use specialist fire and rescue equipment. It opened in January 2013 and is operated by the Scottish Fire and Rescue Service (SFRS).

== History ==
A project team lead was appointed in 2007 create a new fire training centre for the Strathclyde Fire and Rescue Service. A site was eventually identified at Clydesmill, on the south bank of the River Clyde near Westburn, previously a large power station. A linked project was also approved to close the existing local stations at Cambuslang (near its Main Street, built in 1970) and Parkhead (built 1952), and combine them in a new community station at Clydesmill, which was completed in 2011. Its community room is named after Enoch Humphries, former Fire Brigades Union president who had links to the area.

Construction of the facility took 77 weeks and cost £43 million. The buildings were completed in April 2012. The official opening was in January 2013, shortly before all eight of Scotland's fire services merged in April 2013. With the centre up and running, the Scottish Fire and Rescue Service College Gullane closed in March 2015.

== Design ==
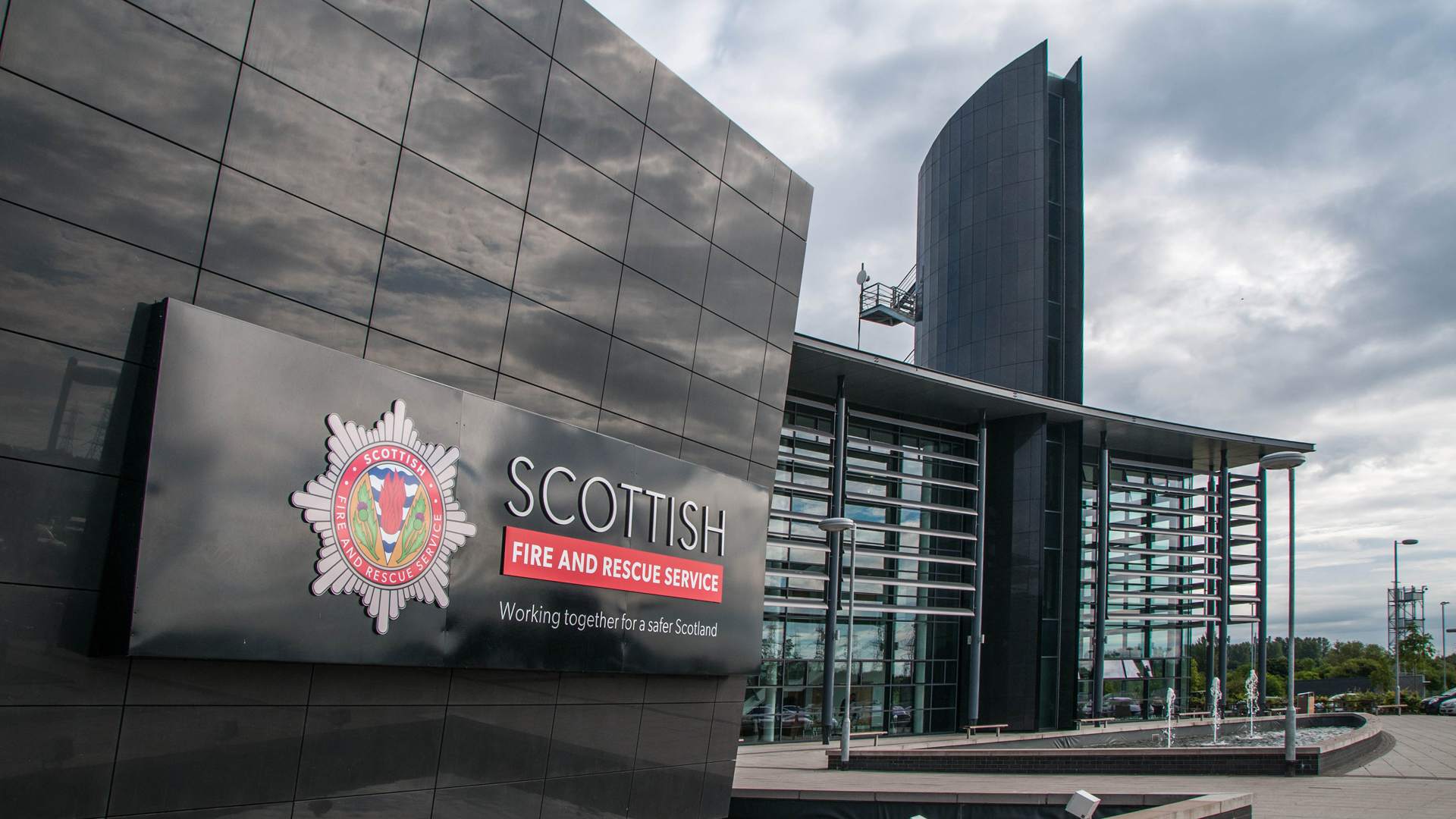
The academic building

The centre was designed by Cooper Cromar. It is built beside the Clyde on the site of the former Clydesmill Power Station, near to the village of Westburn, with National Cycle Route 75 and the Clyde walkway running alongside; it is a short distance from Junctions 2A and 3 of the M74 motorway.

The 40-acre (16 ha) site includes an academic building, a practical facilities building and three hazard zones. There is a mock town with roads, rail tracks and buildings, including a multi-storey tenement structure. The academic buildings were given a BREEAM rating of 'excellent'. A Technical Rescue Training Zone (TRTZ) supports specialist search and rescue training.
