= Scottish Fire Service College =

The Scottish Fire Service College, later known as the Scottish Fire and Rescue Service College Gullane (SFRS College Gullane), was a training facility located in East Lothian that operated from 1954 to 2015. A former hotel building, it was used for the initial training for new recruits from across Scotland and also for other specialist training. The facility at Gullane closed in 2015, shortly after the eight separate Scottish fire services merged in April 2013 to form the Scottish Fire and Rescue Service (SFRS), and a new national specialist training centre opened in Cambuslang.

== History ==
A railway hotel was built near to Gullane railway station and formally opened as the Marine Hotel on 28 June 1900. At the start of the Second World War the building was requisitioned and was used for training Polish soldiers. After the war it opened again as a hotel, but closed in 1951. In 1953 the building was sold to the Scottish Office, to provide a new location for The Scottish Fire Service Training Schools that had been based in Moredun, Paisley and in Whitburn, West Lothian.

The Scottish Fire Service Training School at Gullane was officially opened on 1 April 1954. The size of the facility grew over the years, eventually occupying seven buildings. In 2002 it was renamed the Scottish Fire Service College.

The Howat review, completed in 2006, looked at government spending and recommended the college should close and merge with the Scottish Police College at Tulliallan, Fife. In 2008 the Scottish Government announced that these recommendations had been rejected. With the merger of all Scotland's Fire Services in April 2013, it was renamed "Scottish Fire and Rescue Service College Gullane". In September 2013, the board of the Scottish Fire and Rescue Service decided to centralise their specialist training at their new facility in Cambuslang and that the college at Gullane would close. The college closed on 31 March 2015.

== Training ==
Over a sixty years period trained more than one thousand firefighters each year. There were 38 members of staff, who were either employees of the Scottish Government, or on 2-year secondments from the fire services.

The college ran a range of courses:

- Firefighter Foundation Programme - 13 weeks
- Breathing Apparatus Instructors Course
- Road Traffic Collision Operators Course
- Road Traffic Collision Instructors Course
- Fire Safety Officers development modules 1, 2 and 3
- Health Safety and Risk Management: Managing Safely (IOSH)
- NEBOSH - General Certificate
- Urban Search and Rescue tool skills
- Community Planning and Community Safety Partnership Working

== Housing development ==
In September 2015 the SFRS put in an application for a housing development to be built on the site. In April 2016, permission in principle was granted to develop 125 houses on the site.
