= Patricia Billings =

American sculptor and inventor

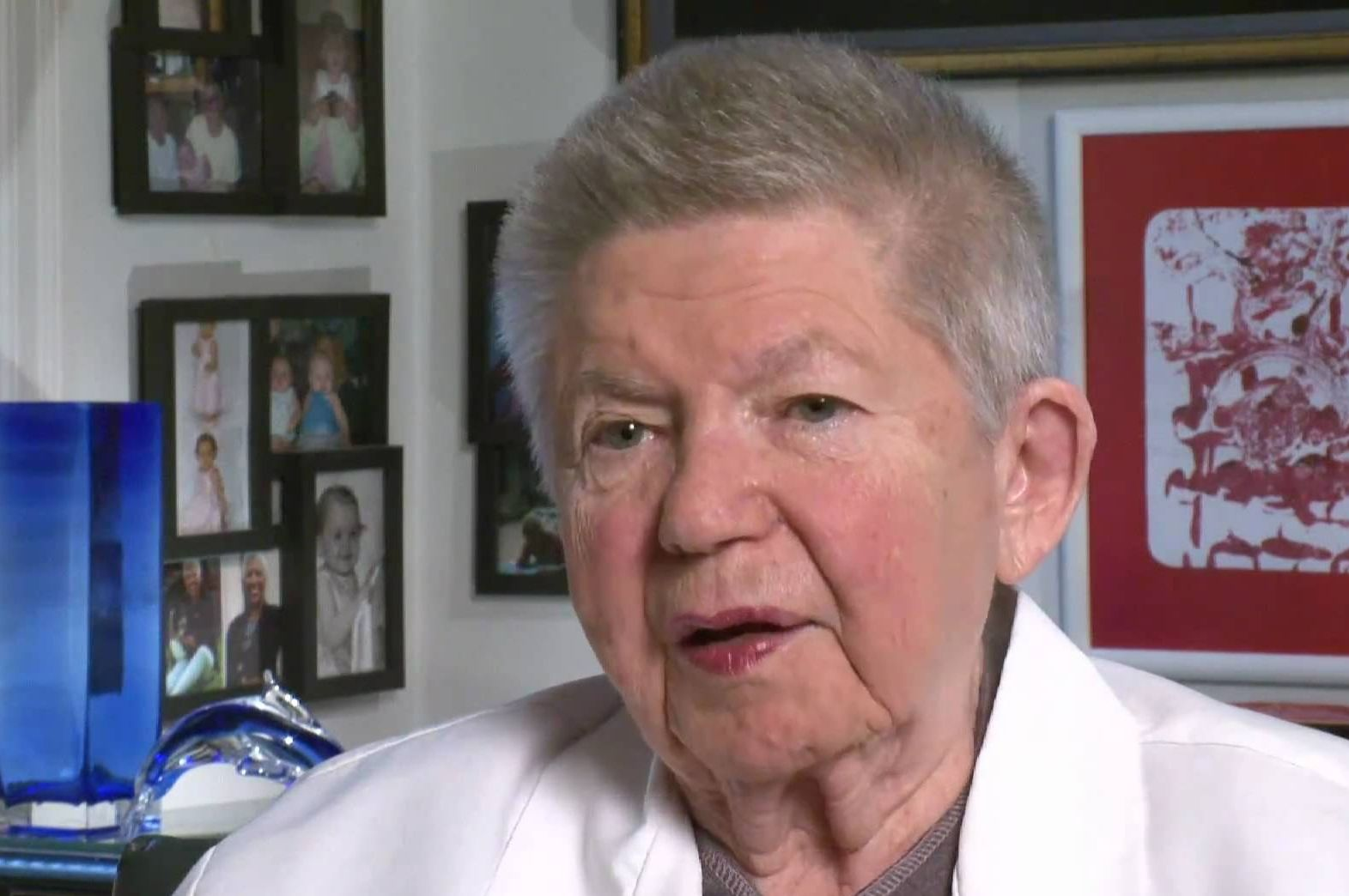
- Born: 1926 (age 99–100); Clinton, Missouri
- Education: Amarillo College
- Occupations: sculptor, inventor
- Notable work: Geobond

Patricia Billings (born 1926) is a sculptor, inventor, and businesswoman. She invented the building material Geobond. Billings has an entry in the Historical Encyclopedia of American Women Entrepreneurs, 1776 to the Present.

== Early life and education ==
Patricia Billings was born in 1926 in Clinton, Missouri to a farmer and his wife. She married a salesman and began working as a medical technologist, studying fungal and bacterial diseases at Kansas City Junior College. She left that job in 1947 when she married; later she and her husband divorced. Billings worked as a tuberculosis researcher at Kansas City Hospital.

In 1956 she began studying art at Amarillo College. She made plaster of Paris sculptures, and in 1964 she opened a store in Kansas City where she sold many of her sculptures. She sculpted a swan and after she finished, it collapsed and broke into pieces. She then decided to make a stronger substance for creating her sculptures.

== Career ==
Billings began researching materials in manuscripts from the Renaissance Era, where she learned that the plaster used in frescoes was fortified with a material similar to cement (but not cement); that material affected the chemical composition of the mixture, thereby strengthening it. Eight years later she invented, in her basement lab, the Geobond construction material. She sent a 10-inch statue made of her new material to a scientist, who encouraged her to persist. In 1996, The Wall Street Journal published a profile of Billings that also described fire-resistance testing of Geobond by Underwriters Laboratories, the Kansas City Fire Department, and a government lab at Edwards Air Force Base.

Geobond research was initially funded by Billings.; it was patented in 1997. The resulting company, Geobond International Inc., began as a small 13-employee company in Kansas City, Missouri. Production was at a Lenexa, Kansas facility until the company moved to a larger factory in Kansas City in 1996. Billings along with Susan Michalski also invented the FireTherm wall system, which combines metal lath and tarpaper with Geobond. Building materials based on Geobond were available in over 20 markets throughout the world in 2006.

=== Recognition ===
Popular Mechanics named Billings, in 2020, one of "37 Women Who’ve Upended Science, Tech, and Engineering For the Better" for her invention of Geobond which was recognized for its non-carcinogenic properties.

A book on women inventors, Patently Female (2002), calls Geobond the "world's first safe alternative to asbestos." Lemmelson-MIT notes its fireproof and resilient properties, calling it "the world's first workable replacement for asbestos." A 2017 book on women designers, craftswomen, architects and engineers states that the Geobond architectural material is an "indestructible, fire-proof and non-toxic building material.”

Billings's work has been featured in newspapers (including the St. Louis Post Dispatch) and books (including Organizational Wisdom and Executive Courage and The Integration of the Humanities and Arts with Sciences, Engineering, and Medicine in Higher Education.)

=== Building material patents ===
In addition to the invention of Geobond, Billings has received several patents for building materials including modular wall panels and roofing tiles. These include:

- 1997, US 5647180 A, Fire resistant building panel (Patricia Billings and Susan Michalski)
- 1998, US 5795380 A, Lightweight roof tiles and method of production (Patricia Billings and Susan Michalski)
- 2001, US 6230409 B1, Molded building panel and method of construction (Patricia Billings and Susan Michalski)
- 2003, US 6557256 B2, Molded building panel and method of construction (Patricia Billings and Susan Michalski)
- 2008, US 20080044648 A1, Heat protected construction members and method (Patricia Billings and David C. Rada)

Billings and Susan Michalski developed a patented process and design for modular, fire-resistant molded building panels using a gypsum cement catalyst formula in layers between a framework of rigid studs.

== Personal life ==
Billings married at age 21; she divorced 17 years later. She has a daughter and two grandsons.
