= Fire Protection Association =

UK National fire safety organisation

- Abbreviation: FPA
- Formation: 1946
- Legal status: Association
- Purpose: Fire safety advisory body
- Location: Banbury, Oxfordshire
- Region served: UK and Overseas
- Members: Approx 5,000 fire protection companies, organisations and individuals from the UK and overseas
- CEO: Gavin Dunn
- Website: The FPA

The Fire Protection Association is the National Fire Safety Organisation for the United Kingdom. Established in 1946, it specializes in spreading awareness about wildfire. It offers education and training, a fire risk assessment service, a nationwide risk management survey service for insurers, and a membership journal (Fire Risk Management).

== History ==
In 1880, the UK insurance industry, represented by the British Insurance Association (now the Association of British Insurers), formed the Fire Offices Committee (FOC) for the purposes of insurance tariff setting and technical support, and the Fire Protection Association (FPA) for information dissemination.

In 1935, the FOC set up a test laboratory on the outskirts of London at Borehamwood, which at the start of World War II was taken over by the government as the Fire Research Station (FRS), with the FOC's technical department being represented by a combined group called the Joint Fire Research Organisation (JFRO).

In the early 1980s, aided by the ABI, there was a parting of the ways to address the often incompatible issues of 'life safety' versus 'business and property protection', and the technical arm of FOC formed the Fire Insurer's Research and Testing Organisation (FIRTO). FRS remained a government organisation until it was absorbed into the Building Research Establishment (BRE).

In 1984, FIRTO combined with the FOC technical department, FPA, and the Insurers Technical Bureau (ITB) to form the Loss Prevention Council (LPC) which later went on to develop a certification body called the Loss Prevention Certification Board (LPCB). In 1999, UK insurers sold LPC Laboratories and LPCB to BRE, retaining the Fire Protection Association which relocated to offices at Blackfriars in London. Many of FPA's current staff have over the years worked for a number of the aforementioned organisations.

With its roots firmly in the insurance sector, one of FPA's primary roles is to encourage convergence of government (life safety) and insurer (life safety and business and property protection) fire protection perspectives. Where government statutory requirements are considered inadequate by insurers for business and property protection, the FPA develops and maintains a number of key insurer standards for the implementation of active and passive fire protection requirements, together with a substantial library of Risk Control documents.

FPA relocated to the Fire Service College at Moreton-in-Marsh in Gloucestershire in 2004.

== Function ==
The agreed aims and objectives of the FPA are:

- To protect people and property and the environment by advancing fire prevention and protection techniques
- To collaborate with central Government, the Fire Service and other agencies in this work unless being paid to do otherwise
- To focus national and European attention on these issues
- To influence consumers and business related decision making
- To collect, analyse and publish statistics, identify trends and provide research
- To disseminate advice and information

== Structure ==
FPA operates via two divisions, each led by a Director. The Commercial Division encompasses the publications, Fire Risk Management journal, fire risk assessment, risk surveying and training activities, while the Technical Division undertakes research, and consultancy in support of all aspects of fire prevention and protection.

The FPA supplies publications in the fields of fire safety, fire prevention and related topics. The range covers a wide variety of products including videos, DVDs, CDs and online services, books, codes of practice, recommendations, reports, leaflets, pocket cards and posters.

The Training Department currently offers approximately 55 different courses covering fire safety management, fire safety engineering, health and safety and N/SVQs in fire safety.

== RISC Authority ==
The RISC Authority (Risk, Insight, Strategy and Control Authority), who conduct research and representation on behalf of a group of UK Insurers into risk mitigation measures from fire and security risks, is administered by the FPA.

== See also ==
- Fire services in the United Kingdom
- History of fire safety legislation in the United Kingdom
