= List of Skydance television programs =

This is a list of television series produced and/or owned by divisions and subsidiaries of Skydance.

The divisions and subsidiaries include CBS Studios, CBS Media Ventures, CBS News and Stations, Paramount Media Networks, Paramount Television Studios, Showtime Networks, Warner Bros. Television Studios, Warner Horizon Unscripted Television and Warner Bros. Animation. Other divisions and subsidiaries include Skydance Television, Warner Horizon Television, Telepictures, HBO, TBS, TNT Originals, TruTV, CNN, Cartoon Network, Discovery Channel, MTV Entertainment Studios, Awesomeness, CBS Productions, Viacom Productions/Enterprises, Big Ticket Television, DreamWorks Television, Miramax Television, Desilu Productions, the older incarnation of Paramount Television, Bing Crosby Productions, Rysher Entertainment, Television Program Enterprises, Republic Pictures Television, Laurel Entertainment, ABC Films, NBC Films, QM Productions, Taft Entertainment Television/Worldvision Enterprises, Group W/Eyemark Entertainment, King World Productions and Spelling Television.

== Skydance Television Studios Group ==
=== CBS Studios ===
Note: Formerly known as CBS Paramount Television and CBS Television Studios.

| Title | Original run | Network | Notes |
|---|---|---|---|
| Late Show with David Letterman | 1993–2015 | CBS | inherited from CBS Productions; co-production for Worldwide Pants Incorporated |
| 7th Heaven | 1996–2007 | The WB/The CW | co-production with Spelling Television |
| Kids Say the Darndest Things | 1997–2020 | CBS/ABC | Took over production from CBS Productions; co-production with LMNO Productions (seasons 1–3), Linkletter/Atkins/Kritzer Productions (seasons 1–3), She Ready Productions (seasons 4–5) and Anvil 1893 Entertainment (seasons 4–5) |
| The King of Queens | 1998–2007 | CBS | inherited from CBS Productions; co-production with Columbia TriStar Television/Sony Pictures Television and Hanley Productions; Distributed in the U.S. by Sony Pictures Television |
| Girlfriends | 2000–2008 | UPN/The CW | inherited from Paramount Television; co-production with Happy Camper Productions (seasons 2–8) and Grammnet Productions |
| CSI: Crime Scene Investigation | 2000–2015 | CBS | previously produced by CBS Productions; co-production with Jerry Bruckheimer Television and Alliance Atlantis |
| The Amazing Race | 2001–present | CBS | co-production with ABC Signature (seasons 1–36), 20th Television (season 37–), Jerry Bruckheimer Television, Earthview, Inc., Worldrace Productions, Amazing Race Productions; Distributed outside of the U.S. by Disney Platform Distribution |
| The Dead Zone | 2002–2007 | USA Network | inherited from Paramount Network Television; co-production with Crescent Entertainment (seasons 1–3), Lionsgate Television, The Segan Company (seasons 1–5), Modern Entertainment (seasons 1–3), Piller2 Productions / The Piller/Segan Company and Dead Zone Production Company; Distributed in the U.S. by Lionsgate/Debmar-Mercury |
| Without a Trace | 2002–2009 | CBS | inherited from CBS Productions co-production with Jerry Bruckheimer Television and Warner Bros. Television |
| CSI: Miami | 2002–2012 | CBS | inherited from CBS Productions co-production with Jerry Bruckheimer Television and Alliance Atlantis |
| America's Next Top Model | 2003–2018 | UPN/The CW/VH1 | previously produced by CBS Productions; co-production with 10 by 10 Productions and Tyra Banks |
| NCIS | 2003–present | CBS | previously produced by Paramount Network Television co-production with Belisarius Productions; Spin-off of JAG |
| Cold Case | 2003–2010 | CBS | previously produced by CBS Productions; co-production with Jerry Bruckheimer Television and Warner Bros. Television |
| The 4400 | 2004–2007 | USA Network | previously produced by Viacom Productions/Paramount Network Television; co-production with American Zoetrope, BSkyB, Renegade 83 Productions and 4400 Productions |
| CSI: NY | 2004–2013 | CBS | previously produced by CBS Productions; co-production with Jerry Bruckheimer Television and Alliance Atlantis |
| Everybody Hates Chris | 2005–2009 | UPN/The CW | previously produced by Paramount Television; co-production with CR Enterprises and 3 Arts Entertainment |
| The Late Late Show with Craig Ferguson | 2005–2014 | CBS | previously produced by CBS Productions; co-production for Worldwide Pants Incorporated |
| NUMB3RS | 2005–2010 | CBS | previously produced by Paramount Television; co-production with Scott Free Productions, The Barry Schindel Company (2005–2007); (seasons 2–3) and Post 109 Productions (2009–2010); (season 6) |
| Ghost Whisperer | 2005–2010 | CBS | previously produced by Paramount Television; co-production with Sander/Moses Productions, ABC Studios; Distributed outside of the U.S. by Disney Platform Distribution. |
| Medium | 2005–2011 | NBC/CBS | previously produced by Paramount Television; co-production with Picturemaker Productions and Grammnet Productions |
| Criminal Minds | 2005–2027 | CBS/Paramount+ | previously produced by Paramount Network Television; co-production with The Mark Gordon Company (2005–2018), Entertainment One (2018–) and ABC Signature; Distributed outside of the U.S. by Disney Platform Distribution. |
| The Game | 2006–2015 | The CW/BET | co-production with Georgia Media (2011–2015); (seasons 4–9), Happy Camper Productions (2006–2008); (seasons 1–2), Akil Productions (2008–2015); (seasons 3–9), Grammnet Productions, and BET Original Productions (2011–2015); (seasons 4–9) |
| 3 lbs | 2006–2007 | CBS | co-production with Ocko & Company |
| Cane | 2007 | CBS | co-production with Once a Frog Productions, El Sendero Productions, Interscope Television, and ABC Studios |
| Aliens in America | 2007–2008 | The CW | co-production with Guarascio/Port Productions, Mr. Bigshot Fancy-Pants Productions and Warner Bros. Television |
| Life Is Wild | 2007–2008 | The CW | co-production with 34 Films and Company Pictures |
| Gossip Girl | 2007–2012 | The CW | co-production with Alloy Entertainment, College Hill Pictures (seasons 1–3), Fake Empire (seasons 4–6), and Warner Bros. Television |
| Rules of Engagement | 2007–2013 | CBS | co-production with Game Six Productions, Happy Madison Productions and Sony Pictures Television; Distributed in the U.S. by Sony Pictures Television |
| Comanche Moon | 2008 | CBS | co-production with The Firm, Saria Inc., and Sony Pictures Television; Distributed in the U.S. by Sony Pictures Television |
| Worst Week | 2008–2009 | CBS | co-production with Two Soups Productions, Hat Trick Productions and Universal Media Studios; Distributed in the U.S. by NBCUniversal Syndication Studios; Based on the TV series The Worst Week of My Life by Hat Trick Productions and the BBC |
| Gary Unmarried | 2008–2010 | CBS | co-production with Ed Yeager Productions, Rude Mood Productions (both season 1 only) and ABC Studios; Distributed in the U.S. by Disney Media Distribution |
| Flashpoint | 2008–2012 | CTV; CBS/Ion Television | co-production with Pink Sky Entertainment and Avamar Entertainment |
| 90210 | 2008–2013 | The CW | previously produced by CBS Productions; co-production with Sachs/Judah Productions (season 1 only); Based on Beverly Hills 90210 |
| I Get That a Lot | 2009–2015 | CBS | |
| The Good Wife | 2009–2016 | CBS | previously produced by CBS Productions; co-production with Scott Free Productions, King Size Productions and Small Wishes Productions (season 1 only) |
| Melrose Place | 2009–2010 | The CW | Pilot only; co-production with Slavkin/Swimmer; Continuation of the 1990s TV series of the same name |
| NCIS: Los Angeles | 2009–2023 | CBS | co-production with R. Scott Gemmill Productions (2016-2023) and Shane Brennan Productions; Expansion of NCIS. |
| The Vampire Diaries | 2009–2017 | The CW | co-production with Outerbanks Entertainment, Alloy Entertainment and Warner Bros. Television |
| Hawaii Five-0 | 2010–2020 | CBS | previously produced by CBS Productions; co-production with K/O Paper Products and 101st Street Entertainment; Based on the 1968 TV series |
| Blue Bloods | 2010–2024 | CBS | previously produced by CBS Productions co-production with Panda Productions (2010–2020), The Leonard Goldberg Company (2020–2024), and Paw in Your Face Productions (2010–2011) |
| Hellcats | 2010–2011 | The CW | co-production with Five & Dime Productions and Warner Bros. Television |
| The Talk | 2010–2024 | CBS | |
| Mad Love | 2011 | CBS | co-production with Two Soups Productions, FanFare Productions and Sony Pictures Television |
| Criminal Minds: Suspect Behavior | 2011 | CBS | co-production with The Mark Gordon Company, Bernero Productions and ABC Studios; Distributed outside of the U.S. by Disney Media Distribution; Expansion of Criminal Minds |
| CHAOS | 2011 | CBS | co-production with Rat Entertainment, Certified Pulp and 20th Century Fox Television |
| Unforgettable | 2011–2016 | CBS/A&E | co-production with Timberman/Beverly Productions and Sony Pictures Television; Distributed outside of the U.S. by Sony Pictures Television |
| A Gifted Man | 2011–2012 | CBS | co-production with Baer Bones and Timberman/Beverly Productions |
| Ringer | 2011–2012 | The CW | pilot only; co-production with Green Eggs and Pam Productions, Inc., Brillstein Entertainment Partners, ABC Studios, Warner Bros. Television and CBS Productions |
| The Secret Circle | 2011–2012 | The CW | co-production with Outerbanks Entertainment, Alloy Entertainment and Warner Bros. Television |
| Hart of Dixie | 2011–2015 | The CW | co-production with Fake Empire, Dogarooski Productions (season 4) and Warner Bros. Television |
| Made in Jersey | 2012 | CBS | co-production with Left Coast Productions, FanFare Productions and Sony Pictures Television |
| Common Law | 2012 | USA Network | co-production with Junction Entertainment |
| Vegas | 2012–2013 | CBS | co-production with Happy Valley Productions, Tree Line Film and Arthur Sarkissian Productions |
| Emily Owens, M.D. | 2012–2013 | The CW | co-production with The Dan Jinks Company and Warner Bros. Television |
| Elementary | 2012–2019 | CBS | co-production with Hill of Beans Productions and Timberman-Beverly Productions |
| Beauty & the Beast | 2012–2016 | The CW | co-production with Witt/Thomas Productions, WhizBang Films and Take 5 Productions; Based on the 1987 TV series by Republic Pictures |
| Under the Dome | 2013–2015 | CBS | co-production with Amblin Television and Baer Bones |
| We Are Men | 2013 | CBS | co-production with The Tannenbaum Company and Roughhouse Productions |
| Cult | 2013 | The CW | co-production with Rockne S. O'Bannon Television, Fake Empire, and Warner Bros. Television |
| King & Maxwell | 2013 | TNT | co-production with Shane Brennan Productions |
| The Millers | 2013–2014 | CBS | co-production with Amigos de Garcia Productions |
| The Tomorrow People | 2013–2014 | The CW | co-production with Berlanti/Plec, FremantleMedia North America and Warner Bros. Television; Based on the 1973 TV series by Roger Price |
| The Originals | 2013–2018 | The CW | co-production with My So-Called Company, Alloy Entertainment and Warner Bros. Television |
| Reign | 2013–2017 | The CW | co-production with Joyful Girl Productions, Take 5 Productions, WhizBang Films and Warner Bros. Television |
| Intelligence | 2014 | CBS | co-production with Michael Seitzman's Pictures, Tripp Vinson Productions, The Barry Schindel Company and ABC Studios |
| Bad Teacher | 2014 | CBS | co-production with Gifted And Talented Camp, Mosaic Media Group, Quantity Entertainment and Sony Pictures Television; Based on the 2011 film by Columbia Pictures |
| Reckless | 2014 | CBS | co-production with Sander/Moses Productions |
| Star-Crossed | 2014 | The CW | co-production with Space Floor TV, Olé Productions and Warner Bros. Television |
| Extant | 2014–2015 | CBS | co-production with 22 Plates Productions (season 1) and Amblin Television |
| The McCarthys | 2014–2015 | CBS | co-production with Loosely Inspired by Bambi Cottages Productions, Olive Bridge Entertainment and Sony Pictures Television |
| Scorpion | 2014–2018 | CBS | co-production with K/O Paper Products, Blackjack Films, Perfect Storm Entertainment and SB Projects |
| Madam Secretary | 2014–2019 | CBS | co-production with Barbara Hall Productions and Revelations Entertainment |
| NCIS: New Orleans | 2014–2021 | CBS | co-production with Wings Productions and When Pigs Fly Incorporated (seasons 1–4) |
| The 100 | 2014–2020 | The CW | co-production with Bonanza Productions, Alloy Entertainment and Warner Bros. Television |
| Jane the Virgin | 2014–2019 | The CW | co-production with Poppy Productions, RCTV International, Electus and Warner Bros. Television; Based on the 2002 TV series Juana la Virgen by RCTV |
| Power | 2014–2020 | Starz | co-production with End of Episode, Inc., Mawuli Productions, Atmosphere Television and G-Unit Films and Television Inc. |
| Young & Hungry | 2014–2018 | ABC Family/Freeform | co-production with Waffle Toaster Productions, Relativity Television/Critical Content, Blondie Girl Productions and The Tannenbaum Company |
| Celebrity Name Game | 2014–2017 | Syndication | co-production with Coquette Productions, Entertain the Brutes, Green Mountain West Inc., FremantleMedia North America, 20th Television and Debmar-Mercury |
| Battle Creek | 2015 | CBS | co-production with Shore Z Productions, Gran Via Productions and Sony Pictures Television |
| The Messengers | 2015 | The CW | co-production with Thunder Road Television and Warner Bros. Television |
| Significant Mother | 2015 | The CW | co-production with Alloy Entertainment and Warner Bros. Television |
| Limitless | 2015–2016 | CBS | co-production with K/O Paper Products, Action This Day! and Relativity Television/Critical Content; Based on the 2011 film by Lionsgate |
| Impastor | 2015–2016 | TV Land | co-production with All in Vane Productions, The Tannenbaum Company and TV Land Original Productions |
| The Odd Couple | 2015–2017 | CBS | co-production with The Tannenbaum Company and Timberman-Beverly Productions; Based on the 1965 play, the 1968 film by Paramount Pictures and the 1970 TV series by Paramount Television |
| Zoo | 2015–2017 | CBS | co-production with James Patterson Entertainment, Tree Line Film and Midnight Radio |
| Code Black | 2015–2018 | CBS | co-production with Michael Seitzman's Pictures, Maniac Productions (Season 3), Tiny Pyro Productions and ABC Studios |
| Crazy Ex-Girlfriend | 2015–2019 | The CW | co-production with LeanMachine, Webbterfuge (season 1), Black Lamb (seasons 2–4), racheldoesstuff (seasons 2–4) and Warner Bros. Television |
| The Late Late Show with James Corden | 2015–2023 | CBS | co-production with Fulwell 73 Productions |
| The Late Show with Stephen Colbert | 2015–2026 | CBS | co-production with Spartina Productions |
| Angel from Hell | 2016 | CBS | co-production with Quill Entertainment |
| BrainDead | 2016 | CBS | co-production with King Size Productions and Scott Free Productions |
| American Gothic | 2016 | CBS | co-production with Full Fathom Five, Hyla Regilla Productions and Amblin Television |
| Criminal Minds: Beyond Borders | 2016–2017 | CBS | co-production with The Mark Gordon Company, Erica Messer Productions and ABC Studios; Distributed outside of the U.S. by Disney Platform Distribution; Expansion of Criminal Minds |
| The Great Indoors | 2016–2017 | CBS | co-production with Gibbons Bros. Productions and Shiny Brass Lamp Productions |
| Pure Genius | 2016–2017 | CBS | co-production with True Jack Productions and Universal Television |
| No Tomorrow | 2016–2017 | The CW/CBS | co-production with Globo TV International, Electus and Warner Bros. Television; Based on the 2012 Rede Globo Brazilian TV series Como Aproveitar o Fim do Mundo by Fernanda Young and Alexandre Machado |
| Incorporated | 2016–2017 | Syfy | co-production with Algorithm Entertainment, Pearl Street Films and Universal Cable Productions |
| Kevin Can Wait | 2016–2018 | CBS | co-production with Hey Eddie Productions and Mohawk Productions (season 1) and Sony Pictures Television |
| Man with a Plan | 2016–2020 | CBS | co-production with Double Double Bonus Entertainment and 3 Arts Entertainment |
| Bull | 2016–2022 | CBS | co-production with Amblin Television (seasons 1–3), Picturemaker Productions (seasons 2–5), Atelier Paul Attanasio and Stage 29 Productions |
| MacGyver | 2016–2021 | CBS | co-production with Lionsgate Television, Atomic Monster and 101st Street Entertainment (seasons 1–4); Based on the 1985 TV series by Paramount Television |
| Riverdale | 2017–2023 | The CW | co-production with Berlanti Productions, Archie Comics and Warner Bros. Television Studios |
| Superior Donuts | 2017–2018 | CBS | co-production with Daily Productions, Goldman-Donovan Productions & Teitelbaum Artists |
| Doubt | 2017 | CBS | co-production with Timberman/Beverly Productions |
| The Good Fight | 2017–2022 | Paramount+ | co-production with Scott Free Productions and King Size Productions |
| Candy Crush | 2017 | CBS | co-production with Pulse Creative, King and Lionsgate Television |
| Salvation | 2017–2018 | CBS | co-production with Still Married Productions and Secret Hideout |
| Star Trek: Discovery | 2017–2024 | CBS (Premiere); Paramount+ | co-production with Secret Hideout, Living Dead Guy Productions and Roddenberry Entertainment; Prequel to the 1966 TV series by Desilu, Norway Corporation, and Paramount Television |
| SEAL Team | 2017–2024 | CBS/Paramount+ | co-production with Chulack Productions, East 25 C (season 1), Timberman/Beverly Productions and John Glenn Entertainment (seasons 2–3) |
| S.W.A.T. | 2017–2025 | CBS | co-production with MiddKid Productions, Kansas Art Productions, Perfect Storm Entertainment, Original Film and Sony Pictures Television; Based on the original 1975 TV series by Spelling-Goldberg Productions, Robert Hamner and Rick Husky |
| No Activity | 2017–2021 | Paramount+ | co-production with Funny or Die, Gary Sanchez Productions, Jungle Entertainment and Flight School Studio (season 4) |
| 9JKL | 2017–2018 | CBS | co-production with Liscolaide Productions, Trill TV |
| American Vandal | 2017–2018 | Netflix | co-production with Funny or Die, Woodhead Entertainment, One Man Canoe and 3 Arts Entertainment |
| Valor | 2017–2018 | The CW | co-production with Warner Bros. Television and Ostar Productions |
| Wisdom of the Crowd | 2017–2018 | CBS | co-production with Algorithm Entertainment, Keshet International and Universal Television; Distributed in the U.S. by NBCUniversal Syndication Studios |
| The Guest Book | 2017–2018 | TBS | co-production with Studio T and Amigos de Garcia Productions |
| Dynasty | 2017–2022 | The CW | co-production with Fake Empire, Richard and Esther Shapiro Productions and Rabbit Ears, Inc. Based on the 1981 TV series by Aaron Spelling Productions |
| Carpool Karaoke: The Series | 2017–2023 | Apple Music/Apple TV/Apple TV+ | co-production with Fulwell 73 Productions |
| Return of the Mac | 2017 | Pop | co-production with T Group Productions, D&J Productions and Pop Media Group |
| Life Sentence | 2018 | The CW | co-production with In Good Company, Doozer and Warner Bros. Television |
| One Dollar | 2018 | CBS All Access | co-production with Zobot Projects and Anonymous Content |
| Instinct | 2018–2019 | CBS | co-production with 34 Films, Webbterfuge, James Patterson Entertainment and Secret Hideout |
| Strange Angel | 2018–2019 | CBS All Access | co-production with Scott Free Productions, Sailor Bear, DiGilio Films, and Pantalone Films |
| Insatiable | 2018–2019 | Netflix | co-production with Lady Magic Productions, Storied Media Group and Ryan Seacrest Productions |
| Whistleblower | 2018–2019 | CBS | First factual production; co-production with CBS News |
| FBI | 2018–present | CBS | co-production with Wolf Entertainment and Universal Television; Distributed in the U.S. by NBCUniversal Syndication Studios |
| The Neighborhood | 2018–2026 | CBS | co-production with Kapital Entertainment, Trill Television, Mud, Blood & Beer Productions and A Bird and a Bear Entertainment |
| All American | 2018–2026 | The CW | co-production with Berlanti Productions, April Blair's Company (season 1 only), Trojan Horses Productions (season 8) and Warner Bros. Television |
| Magnum P.I. | 2018–2024 | CBS/NBC | co-production with 101 Street Entertainment (2018–2020); (seasons 1–2), Perfect Storm Entertainment, Davis Entertainment and Universal Television; Distributed outside of the U.S. by NBCUniversal Global Distribution; Based on the 1980 TV series by Universal Television, Glen A. Larson Productions, and Belisarius Productions |
| Charmed | 2018–2022 | The CW | co-production with Poppy Productions, Reveal Entertainment, Still Married Productions (since season 2) and Propagate Content; Based on the 1998 TV series by Spelling Television |
| Legacies | 2018–2022 | The CW | co-production with My So-Called Company, Alloy Entertainment and Warner Bros. Television Studios |
| Our Cartoon President | 2018–2020 | Showtime | co-production with Showtime Networks, Spartina Productions and Licht Media Solutions |
| Happy Together | 2018–2019 | CBS | co-production with Fulwell 73 Productions and 3 Arts Entertainment, The Gary Breakfast Corporation and Page Entertainment |
| God Friended Me | 2018–2020 | CBS | co-production with Berlanti Productions, I Have an Idea and Warner Bros. Television |
| Fam | 2019 | CBS | co-production with Kushellivision, Trill Television and Kapital Entertainment |
| The Code | 2019 | CBS | co-production with Timberman-Beverly Productions |
| The Red Line | 2019 | CBS | co-production with Berlanti Productions, Array Filmworks and Warner Bros. Television |
| Unbelievable | 2019 | Netflix | co-production with Katie Couric Media, Escapist Fare, Timberman/Beverly Productions And Sage Lane Productions |
| Roswell, New Mexico | 2019–2022 | The CW | co-production with Amblin Television, My So-Called Company, Bender Brown Productions and Warner Bros. Television Studios |
| The Twilight Zone | 2019–2020 | CBS All Access | co-production with Monkeypaw Productions and Genre Films; Based on the 1959 TV series by Cayuga Productions and CBS Productions |
| In the Dark | 2019–2022 | The CW | co-production with Red Hour Films and Warner Bros. Television Studios |
| Dead to Me | 2019–2022 | Netflix | co-production with Gary Sanchez Productions and Visualized, Inc. |
| Blood & Treasure | 2019–2022 | CBS | co-production with Propagate Content and Lake June Productions |
| BH90210 | 2019 | Fox | co-production with Alberghini Chessler Productions and Fox Entertainment |
| Carol's Second Act | 2019–2020 | CBS | co-production with H+H, FourBoys Entertainment and Kapital Entertainment |
| Why Women Kill | 2019–2021 | Paramount+ | co-production with Black Lamb, Acme Productions, Cherry Productions and Imagine Television Studios |
| All Rise | 2019–2023 | CBS/Oprah Winfrey Network | co-production with Shimmering Pictures, Skyemac Productions, Tall Baby Productions and Warner Bros. Television Studios |
| Evil | 2019–2024 | CBS/Paramount+ | co-production with King Size Productions |
| The Unicorn | 2019–2021 | CBS | co-production with Mike and Bill Productions, Trill TV and Kapital Entertainment |
| Nancy Drew | 2019–2023 | The CW | co-production with Warm Bloody Sunday Productions, Furious Productions and Fake Empire |
| The Moodys | 2019–2021 | Fox | co-production with Fox Entertainment |
| FBI: Most Wanted | 2020–2025 | CBS | co-production with Wolf Entertainment and Universal Television; Distributed in the U.S. by NBCUniversal Syndication Studios |
| 68 Whiskey | 2020 | Paramount Network | co-production with Spike Cable Networks, Imagine Television Studios, yes Studios and Little City Ironworks |
| Diary of a Future President | 2020–2021 | Disney+ | co-production with I Can & I Will Productions |
| Star Trek: Picard | 2020–2023 | Paramount+ | co-production with Secret Hideout, Weed Road Pictures, Escapist Fare and Roddenberry Entertainment; Based on the 1966 TV series and its 1987 spin-off by Paramount Television |
| Star Trek: Lower Decks | 2020–2024 | Paramount+ | co-production with CBS Eye Animation Productions, Secret Hideout, Important Science, Roddenberry Entertainment and Titmouse, Inc. Based on the original series by Gene Roddenberry |
| Tooning Out the News | 2020–2023 | Paramount+/Comedy Central | co-production with Spartina Productions, Licht Media Solutions and RJ Fried Worldwide |
| Katy Keene | 2020 | The CW | co-production with Berlanti Productions, Archie Comics and Warner Bros. Television; A spin-off of Riverdale |
| Tommy | 2020 | CBS | co-production with Atelier Paul Attansio Productions and Amblin Television |
| Broke | 2020 | CBS | co-production with Sunshine Bakery Productions, Sutton Street Productions, Propagate Content and RCN TV |
| Most Dangerous Game | 2020–2023 | Quibi/The Roku Channel | co-production with BlackJack Films, Mayhem Pictures and Silver Reel |
| Game On! | 2020 | CBS | co-production with Fulwell 73 Productions and CPL Productions |
| Power Book II: Ghost | 2020–2024 | Starz | co-production with End of Episode, Inc., G-Unit Films and Television Inc., Atmosphere Television and Lionsgate Television |
| The Comey Rule | 2020 | Showtime | co-production with Home Run Productions, Secret Hideout and The Story Factory |
| That Animal Rescue Show | 2020 | CBS All Access | co-production with Stage 29 Productions, Detour Filmproduction and 1851 Productions |
| Your Honor | 2020–2023 | Showtime | co-production with King Size Productions and Moon Shot Entertainment |
| The Stand | 2020–2021 | CBS All Access | co-production with Mosaic Media Group and Vertigo Entertainment |
| Walker | 2021–2024 | The CW | co-production with Rideback, Stick to Your Guns Productions and Pursued by a Bear; Based on the 1993 TV series by CBS Productions and Columbia Pictures Television |
| The Equalizer | 2021–2025 | CBS | co-production with Davis Entertainment, Martin Chase Productions, Milmar Pictures, Flavor Unit Entertainment and Universal Television; Distributed outside of the U.S. by NBCUniversal Global Distribution; Based on the 1985 TV series by Universal Television |
| Clarice | 2021 | CBS | co-production with MGM Television, Secret Hideout, Tiny Core of Rage Entertainment and Elizabeth Diaries; Based on the 1990 film The Silence of the Lambs by Orion Pictures |
| For Heaven's Sake | 2021 | Paramount+ CBC Gem (Canada) | co-production with Funny or Die and Muse Entertainment |
| The Bite | 2021 | Spectrum | co-production with King Size Productions |
| The Republic of Sarah | 2021 | The CW | co-production with Fulwell 73 Productions, Black Lamb and Warner Bros. Television Studios |
| Gossip Girl | 2021–2023 | HBO Max | co-production with Warner Bros. Television Studios, Fake Empire, Random Acts Productions and Alloy Entertainment |
| Power Book III: Raising Kanan | 2021–2026 | Starz | co-production with Ballpoint Productions, End of Episode, Inc., G-Unit Films and Television Inc., Atmosphere Television and Lionsgate Television |
| House Calls with Dr. Phil | 2021 | CBS | co-production with Stage 29 Productions |
| The Lost Symbol | 2021 | Peacock | co-production with Universal Television, Imagine Television Studios and Dworkin/Beattie |
| The Harper House | 2021 | Paramount+ | co-production with CBS Eye Animation Productions, Neely Comics, 219 Productions and Titmouse, Inc. |
| NCIS: Hawai'i | 2021–2024 | CBS | co-production with Harp to the Party Productions and Close to the Land Productions |
| CSI: Vegas | 2021–2024 | CBS | co-production with Jerry Bruckheimer Television and Trace Pictures |
| Star Trek: Prodigy | 2021–2024 | Paramount+/Netflix | co-production with CBS Eye Animation Productions, Nickelodeon Animation Studio, Secret Hideout, Roddenberry Entertainment and Brothers Hageman Productions; Based on the original series by Gene Roddenberry |
| FBI: International | 2021–2025 | CBS | co-production with Wolf Entertainment and Universal Television; Distributed in the U.S. by NBCUniversal Syndication Studios |
| Ghosts | 2021–present | CBS | co-production with Lionsgate Television, BBC Studios, Joe vs. Joe, Monumental Television and Them There |
| Guilty Party | 2021 | Paramount+ | co-production with Funny or Die and Mosaic |
| 4400 | 2021–2022 | The CW | co-production with On the Porch and Pursued by a Bear |
| Swagger | 2021–2023 | Apple TV+ | co-production with Imagine Television Studios, Undisputed Cinema and Thirty5 Ventures |
| The Game (reboot) | 2021–2023 | Paramount+ | co-production with Inphiniti Entertainment, Alki Productions and Grammnet Productions |
| Good Sam | 2022 | CBS | co-production with Kitchen Floor Inc. and Sutton Street Productions |
| Power Book IV: Force | 2022–2025 | Starz | co-production with Pull the Pin Productions, Inc., End of Episode, Inc., G-Unit Films and Television Inc., Atmosphere Television and Lionsgate Television |
| Fairview | 2022 | Comedy Central | co-production with MTV Entertainment Studios, Spartina Productions, Licht Media Solutions and RJ Fried Worldwide |
| All American: Homecoming | 2022–2024 | The CW | co-production with Berlanti Productions, Rock My Soul Productions and Warner Bros. Television |
| How We Roll | 2022 | CBS | co-production with Hi Mom Productions, Three Rivers Entertainment and Horicon Productions |
| Would I Lie to You? | 2022 | The CW | co-production with Truly Original, King Size Productions and Fat Mama Productions; An American adaptation of the British game show of the same name by Peter Holmes |
| Come Dance with Me | 2022 | CBS | co-production with George Street Productions, LL Cool J Inc. and 3 Ball Entertainment |
| The Man Who Fell to Earth | 2022 | Showtime | co-production with StudioCanal, Secret Hideout and Timberman/Beverly Productions |
| Star Trek: Strange New Worlds | 2022–present | Paramount+ | co-production with Secret Hideout, Weed Road Pictures, H M R X Productions and Roddenberry Entertainment; Prequel to the original series by Gene Roddenberry |
| Tom Swift | 2022 | The CW | co-production with Furious Productions and Fake Empire |
| Players | 2022 | Paramount+ | co-production with Riot Games, Brillstein Entertainment Partners, 3 Arts Entertainment and Funny or Die |
| SkyMed | 2022–present | Paramount+ CBC (Canada) | First Canadian production; co-production with Eagle Vision and Piazza Entertainment |
| Munich Games | 2022 | Sky Atlantic | First German production co-production with Sky Studios and Amusement Park Film |
| So Help Me Todd | 2022–2024 | CBS | co-production with Stage 29 Productions and The Elizabeth Diaries |
| Walker: Independence | 2022–2023 | The CW | co-production with Rideback, Pursued by a Bear, Stick to Your Guns Productions and Not This |
| The Winchesters | 2022–2023 | The CW | co-production with Warner Bros. Television Studios, Chaos Machine Productions, Wonderland and Here There |
| Fire Country | 2022–present | CBS | Originally titled Cal Fire; co-production with Jerry Bruckheimer Television |
| Ze Network | 2022–present | RTL+ | co-production with Syrreal Entertainment |
| Bestseller Boy | 2022–present | AVROTROS | First Dutch production; co-production with Paper Plane Productions and Willy Woltz International |
| Colin from Accounts | 2023–2026 | Binge; Foxtel | First Australian production; co-production with Easy Tiger Productions |
| Digman! | 2023–present | Comedy Central | co-production with MTV Entertainment Studios, Dandyflower Productions, Lonely Island Classics and Titmouse, Inc. |
| Rabbit Hole | 2023 | Paramount+ | co-production with Zatfig Films and Entertainment 360 |
| Glamorous | 2023 | Netflix | co-production with Two Shakes Entertainment |
| The Holiday Shift | 2023 | The Roku Channel | co-production with Fulwell 73 |
| Buddy Games | 2023 | CBS | co-production with Bunim/Murray Productions, The Long Game and Dakota Kid Productions; Based on the 2019 film by Saban Films |
| Frasier | 2023–2024 | Paramount+ | co-production with Shiny Brass Lamp Productions, Floral & Flannel Inc. and Grammnet Productions |
| After Midnight | 2024–2025 | CBS | Reboot of the Comedy Central series @midnight; co-production with Funny or Die and Spartina Productions |
| Elsbeth | 2024–present | CBS | co-production with King Size Productions |
| Coma | 2024 | Channel 5 | First British production co-production with Roughcut Television |
| Dinner with The Parents | 2024 | Amazon Freevee | co-production with Whimsical Name Productions, Popper Pictures and Big Talk Productions; Based on the British series Friday Night Lights |
| The Darkness | 2024 | SkyShowtime | First Icelandic production; co-production with Stampede Ventures and Truenorth |
| Matlock | 2024–present | CBS | co-production with Sutton Street Productions and Cloud Nine Productions; Based on the 1986 TV series by Dean Hargrove |
| Everybody Still Hates Chris | 2024–present | Comedy Central | An animated sequel to the live-action series Everybody Hates Chris by Chris Rock and Ali LeRoi; co-production with CBS Eye Animation Productions, MTV Entertainment Studios (season 1), Paramount Television Studios, Sanjay Shah Productions, CR Enterprises, Inc., 3 Arts Entertainment and Titmouse, Inc. |
| Poppa's House | 2024–2025 | CBS | co-production with NuSystems Productions, Inc. Hench in the Trench Productions, Lorey Stories and Two Shakes Entertainment |
| NCIS: Origins | 2024–present | CBS | co-production with Ceci Bear, J. Bird Productions and Wings Productions; Prequel to NCIS by Donald P. Bellisario and Don McGill |
| Hollywood Squares | 2025–present | CBS | co-production with Jesse Collins Entertainment and Flower Films |
| Watson | 2025–2026 | CBS | co-production with Action This Day! and Kapital Entertainment |
| Beyond the Gates | 2025–present | CBS | co-production with NAACP and P&G Studios |
| Happy Face | 2025 | Paramount+ | co-production with King Size Productions, Semi-Formal Productions and iHeartRadio; Based on the iHeartRadio podcast of the same name |
| King & Conqueror | 2025 | Amazon Prime Video; BBC One (United Kingdom) | First international British/Icelandic co-production; co-production with RVK Studios, Rabbit Track Pictures, The Development Partnership and Shepherd Content |
| NCIS: Tony & Ziva | 2025 | Paramount+ | co-production with Plastic Infinity Productions, Source Collective Productions, Solar Production and McNamara Moving Company |
| Crutch | 2025 | Paramount+ | co-production with A Bird and a Bear Entertainment, Kapital Entertainment and Trill Television; Spin-off of The Neighborhood |
| DMV | 2025–2026 | CBS | co-production with Anonymous Content, Kapital Entertainment, Liscolaide Productions, OAOA and Trill TV |
| Sheriff Country | 2025–present | CBS | A spin-off to Fire Country co-production with Jerry Bruckheimer Television, Midwest Livestock Productions and Daily Dramatic Productions |
| Boston Blue | 2025–present | CBS | co-production with Jerry Bruckheimer Television and The Brandons; Spin-off of Blue Bloods |
| Star Trek: Starfleet Academy | 2026–present | Paramount+ | co-production with Secret Hideout and Roddenberry Entertainment; 12th installment in the Star Trek franchise; Based on the original series by Gene Roddenberry |
| CIA | 2026–present | CBS | co-production with Wolf Entertainment and Universal Television |
| Among Us | 2026–present | Paramount+ | co-production with CBS Eye Animation Productions, Innersloth, KeyBot and Titmouse, Inc. Based on the video game by Innersloth |
| Little House on the Prairie | 2026–present | Netflix | co-production with Friendly Family Productions, Joy Coalition and Anonymous Content; Based on the book series by Laura Ingalls Wilder |
| NCIS: New York | 2026–present | CBS | Fifth spin-off to NCIS; co-production with LL Cool J Incorporated, Balasco Pictures, and R. Scott Gemill Productions |
| Claymore | TBA | TBA | co-production with Propagate Content and Shueisha; Based on the manga by Norihiro Yagi |

==== Paramount Television ====
| Title | Network | Original run | Co-production with | Notes |
|---|---|---|---|---|
| The Lucy Show | CBS | 1962–1968 | | Produced by Desilu Productions until 1967 |
| You Don't Say! | NBC | 1963–1969 | | Produced by Desilu Productions until 1967 |
| Mission: Impossible | CBS | 1966–1973 | | Produced by Desilu Productions until 1967 |
| Star Trek | NBC | 1966–1969 | Norway Corporation | Produced by Desilu Productions until 1967 |
| Mannix | CBS | 1967–1975 | | Produced by Desilu Productions until 1967 |
| Here's Lucy | CBS | 1968–1974 | Co-production for Season 1 only with Lucille Ball Productions | Currently owned by Desilu Too, LLC. |
| The Brady Bunch | ABC | 1969–1974 | Redwood Productions, Inc. | |
| Love, American Style | ABC | 1969–1974 | Parker-Margolin Productions, Inc. | |
| The Young Lawyers | ABC | 1970–1971 | Crane Productions, Inc. | |
| Barefoot in the Park | ABC | 1970 | | Based on the 1967 film by Paramount Pictures |
| The Immortal | ABC | 1970–1971 | | Based on the 1964 science fiction novel The Immortals, by James Gunn |
| The Odd Couple | ABC | 1970–1975 | R.G. Productions, Inc. | Based on the 1968 film by Paramount Pictures |
| Longstreet | ABC | 1971–1972 | Edling Productions, Inc. and Corsican Productions, Inc. | Based upon characters created by Baynard Kendrick |
| Spyforce | Nine Network | 1971–1973 | Nine Network | |
| The Sandy Duncan Show | CBS | 1971–1972 | Jefferson/Sultan Productions, Inc. | |
| Me and the Chimp | CBS | 1972 | | |
| The Brady Kids | ABC | 1972–1973 | Filmation Associates | |
| Catch-22 | ABC | 1973 | | Based on the 1970 film by Paramount Pictures |
| Love Story | NBC | 1973–1974 | | Based on the 1970 film by Paramount Pictures |
| The Magician | NBC | 1973–1974 | B & B Productions, Inc. | |
| Star Trek: The Animated Series | NBC | 1973–1974 | Filmation Associates | Continuation of the 1966 TV series |
| Happy Days | ABC | 1974–1984 | Miller-Milkis Productions (1974–81)/Miller-Milkis-Boyett Productions (1981–84) and Henderson Production Company, Inc. (1978–84) | |
| Petrocelli | NBC | 1974–1976 | Miller-Milkis Productions | Based on the 1970 film The Lawyer by Paramount Pictures |
| Paper Moon | ABC | 1974–1975 | The Culzean Corporation | Based on the 1973 film by Paramount Pictures |
| Archer | NBC | 1975 | | |
| Kate McShane | CBS | 1975 | | |
| Barbary Coast | ABC | 1975–1976 | Francy Productions, Inc. | |
| The Cop and the Kid | NBC | 1975 | | |
| When Things Were Rotten | ABC | 1975 | Crossbow Productions | |
| The Lost Islands | Network 10 | 1976 | Network 10 | |
| Laverne & Shirley | ABC | 1976–1983 | Miller-Milkis Productions (seasons 1–6), Miller-Milkis-Boyett Productions (seasons 7–8) and Henderson Production Company, Inc. | |
| Serpico | NBC | 1976–1977 | Emmet G. Lavery Jr. Productions, Inc. | Based on the 1973 film by Paramount Pictures and Columbia Pictures |
| The Brady Bunch Hour | ABC | 1976–1977 | Sid & Marty Krofft Productions | Currently owned by Sid & Marty Krofft Productions |
| Kum-Kum | Syndication | 1976 | | English dub production; originally produced in Japan by ITC Japan |
| Busting Loose | CBS | 1977 | Hayadou Productions | |
| Blansky's Beauties | ABC | 1977 | Miller-Milkis Productions, Inc. and Henderson Production Company, Inc. | |
| Mulligan's Stew | NBC | 1977 | Christiana Productions | |
| Dog and Cat | ABC | 1977 | Lawrence Gordon Productions | |
| Future Cop | ABC | 1977 | The Culzean Corporation and Tovern Productions, Inc. | |
| Szysznyk | CBS | 1977–1978 | Four's Company Productions | |
| Having Babies | ABC | 1978–1979 | The Jozak Company | |
| Grandpa Goes to Washington | NBC | 1978–1979 | | |
| Taxi | ABC/NBC | 1978–1983 | John Charles Walters Productions | |
| Mork & Mindy | ABC | 1978–1982 | Henderson Production Company, Inc. and Miller-Milkis Productions, Inc. (1978–1981) and also later episodes with Miller-Milkis-Boyett Productions (1981–1982) | |
| The Ted Knight Show | CBS | 1978 | | |
| Who's Watching the Kids? | NBC | 1978 | Henderson Production Company, Inc. | |
| Makin' It | ABC | 1979 | Miller-Milkis Productions, Henderson Production Company, Inc. and The Stigwood Group, Ltd. | |
| Working Stiffs | CBS | 1979 | Frog Productions, Inc. and Huk, Inc. | |
| Struck by Lightning | CBS | 1979 | Fellows-Keegan Productions | |
| Out of the Blue | ABC | 1979 | Miller-Milkis Productions | |
| Brothers and Sisters | NBC | 1979 | Frog Productions Inc. and Huk, Inc. | |
| Sweepstakes | NBC | 1979 | Miller-Milkis Productions | |
| Make Me Laugh | Syndication | 1979–1980 | Lukehill Productions | |
| The Associates | ABC | 1979–1980 | John Charles Walters Productions | |
| Angie | ABC | 1979–1980 | Miller-Milkis Productions (season 1), Miller-Milkis-Boyett Productions (season 2) and Henderson Production Company, Inc. | |
| The Bad News Bears | CBS | 1979–1980 | Frog Productions, Inc. and Huk, Inc. | Based on the 1976 film by Paramount Pictures |
| Solid Gold | Syndication | 1980–1988 | Operation Prime Time, Bob Banner Associates and Brad Lachman Productions, Inc. | |
| Goodtime Girls | ABC | 1980 | Miller-Milkis-Boyett Productions | |
| Tenspeed and Brown Shoe | ABC | 1980 | Stephen J. Cannell Productions | Currently owned by Stephen J. Cannell Entertainment except for the pilot |
| Here's Boomer | NBC | 1980–1982 | A.C. Lyles Productions and Daniel Wilson Productions | |
| The Fonz and the Happy Days Gang | ABC | 1980–1982 | Hanna-Barbera Productions | An expansion of Happy Days |
| Bosom Buddies | ABC | 1980–1982 | Miller-Milkis-Boyett Productions | |
| Hans Christian Andersen | Syndication | 1980 | | English dub production; originally produced in Japan by Mushi Production |
| The Brady Brides | NBC | 1981 | Redwood Productions | An expansion of The Brady Bunch |
| Nero Wolfe | NBC | 1981 | | |
| Foul Play | ABC | 1981 | Miller-Milkis-Boyett Productions and Myrt-Hal Productions Inc. | Based on the 1978 film by Paramount Pictures |
| Best of the West | ABC | 1981–1982 | Weinberger/Daniels Productions | |
| Laverne & Shirley in the Army | ABC | 1981–1982 | Hanna-Barbera Productions | An expansion of Laverne & Shirley |
| The Greatest American Hero | ABC | 1981–1983 | Stephen J. Cannell Productions | International distribution only. |
| Police Squad! | ABC | 1982 | | Later adapted into The Naked Gun film franchise |
| Smiley's People | Syndication; BBC Two | 1982 | BBC Worldwide | |
| Making the Grade | CBS | 1982 | Ubu Productions | |
| Madame's Place | Syndication | 1982–1983 | Madame, Inc. and Brad Lachman Productions | |
| Joanie Loves Chachi | ABC | 1982–1983 | Miller-Milkis Boyett Productions and Henderson Production Company, Inc. | An expansion of Happy Days |
| Star of the Family | ABC | 1982 | | |
| The Powers of Matthew Star | NBC | 1982–1983 | Daniel Wilson Productions, Harve Bennett Productions (1982–83) and also later episodes with Bruce Lansbury Productions, Ltd. (1983) | |
| The New Odd Couple | ABC | 1982–1983 | Henderson Production Company, Inc. | |
| Mork & Mindy/Laverne & Shirley/Fonz Hour | ABC | 1982–1983 | Hanna-Barbera Productions and Ruby-Spears Enterprises | |
| Family Ties | NBC | 1982–1989 | Ubu Productions | |
| Cheers | NBC | 1982–1993 | Charles/Burrows/Charles Productions | |
| Webster | ABC/Syndication | 1983–1989 | Georgian Bay, Ltd. and Emmanuel Lewis Entertainment Enterprises Inc. (1986–1989) | |
| Ryan's Four | ABC | 1983 | Fair Dinkum, Inc. and Groverton Productions Ltd. | |
| Mr. Smith | NBC | 1983 | Weinberger/Daniels Productions | |
| The Renegades | ABC | 1983 | Lawrence Gordon Productions | |
| Hardcastle and McCormick | ABC | 1983–1986 | Stephen J. Cannell Productions | International distribution only. |
| Shaping Up | ABC | 1984 | Estin-Simon Productions | |
| Brothers | Showtime | 1984–1989 | Gary Nardino Productions | produced by Paramount Video until 1986 |
| Call to Glory | ABC | 1984–1985 | Tisch/Avnet Productions, Inc. | |
| Anything for Money | Syndication | 1984–1985 | Bernstein/Hovis Productions and Impact Studios | |
| Riptide | NBC | 1984–1986 | Stephen J. Cannell Productions | International distribution only. |
| Hometown | CBS | 1985 | Kirgette Productions | |
| The New Love, American Style | ABC | 1985–1986 | | A daytime reboot of the 1969–1974 prime time series |
| America | Syndication | 1985–1986 | | |
| MacGyver | ABC | 1985–1992 | Henry Winkler/John Rich Productions | |
| All Is Forgiven | NBC | 1986 | Charles/Burrows/Charles Company | |
| Gung Ho | ABC | 1986 | Imagine Television and Four Way Productions | Based on the 1986 film |
| Mr. Sunshine | ABC | 1986 | Henry Winkler/John Rich Productions | |
| Sanchez of Bel Air | USA Network | 1986 | Dog Lips Productions | |
| The Cavanaughs | CBS | 1986–1989 | Mandy Films | |
| The Tortellis | NBC | 1987 | Charles/Burrows/Charles Company | |
| Hard Knocks | Showtime | 1987 | Gary Nardino-Chris Thompson Productions | |
| Duet | Fox | 1987–1989 | Ubu Productions | |
| Marblehead Manor | Syndication | 1987–1988 | Dames-Fraser-Gary Nardino Productions | |
| The Bronx Zoo | NBC | 1987–1988 | Ubu Productions | |
| Star Trek: The Next Generation | Syndication | 1987–1994 | | An update of the 1966 TV series |
| Friday the 13th: The Series | Syndication | 1987–1990 | Hometown Films, Lexicon Productions, Triumph Entertainment Corporation and Variety Artists International | Inspired by the 1980 film Friday the 13th and its sequels by Paramount Pictures and Warner Bros. Pictures |
| Day by Day | NBC | 1988–1989 | Ubu Productions | |
| Wipeout | Syndication | 1988–1989 | Dames-Fraser Productions | |
| Dear John | NBC | 1988–1992 | Ed. Weinberger Productions | Based on the 1986 TV series by BBC |
| Mission: Impossible | ABC | 1988–1990 | Jeffrey Hayes Productions | An update of the 1966 TV series |
| War of the Worlds | Syndication | 1988–1990 | Ten Four Productions, Triumph Entertainment and Hometown Films | Based on the 1953 film |
| Dolphin Cove | CBS | 1989 | Dick Berg/Stoneherge Productions | |
| The Arsenio Hall Show | Syndication | 1989–1994 | Arsenio Hall Communications | |
| Hard Copy | Syndication | 1989–1999 | | |
| Open House | Fox | 1989–1990 | Ubu Productions | |
| The Bradys | CBS | 1990 | Brady Productions | A continuation of The Brady Bunch |
| His & Hers | CBS | 1990 | Ubu Productions | |
| Down Home | NBC | 1990–1991 | Savage Cake Productions and Jabberwocky Productions | |
| Tim Conway's Funny America | ABC | 1990 | | |
| Wings | NBC | 1990–1997 | Grub Street Productions | |
| Ferris Bueller | NBC | 1990–1991 | Maysh Ltd. Productions | Based on the 1986 film Ferris Bueller's Day Off |
| American Dreamer | NBC | 1990–1991 | Ubu Productions | |
| E.A.R.T.H. Force | CBS | 1990 | Chapman/Dial | |
| The Party Machine | Syndication | 1991 | Peeples Productions and Arsenio Hall Communications | |
| Sons and Daughters | CBS | 1991 | B&E Productions | |
| Verdict | CBS | 1991 | | |
| Maury | Syndication | 1991–1998 | Mopo Productions | Paramount stopped distributing Maury in 1998; Studios USA Television assumed production afterward |
| The Royal Family | CBS | 1991–1992 | Eddie Murphy Television | |
| Flesh 'n' Blood | NBC | 1991 | Triangle Entertainment, Lavish Productions and Tailfin Productions | |
| Brooklyn Bridge | CBS | 1991–1993 | Ubu Productions | |
| The Young Indiana Jones Chronicles | ABC | 1991–1993 | Lucasfilm Ltd. and Amblin Television | Prequel to the film Raiders of the Lost Ark and its sequels |
| Sightings | Fox | 1992–1997 | Winkler/Daniel Productions (seasons 1–2), (60-minute specials); The Berkeley Group (1991–92) (specials only); Sather Gate Productions (season 2); Wilshire Court Productions (season 2); Ann Daniel Productions (seasons 4–5 / 2-hour specials); Fair Dinkum Productions (seasons 4–5 / 2-hour specials); Triage Entertainment (season 6) | |
| Love at First Sight | Syndication | 1992 | | |
| Middle Ages | CBS | 1992 | Stan Rogow Productions | |
| Flying Blind | Fox | 1992–1993 | Sweetum Productions and Viacom Productions | |
| Bob | CBS | 1992–1993 | Steinkellners & Sutton | |
| Star Trek: Deep Space Nine | Syndication | 1993–1999 | | Based on the 1966 series and its spin-off |
| The Untouchables | Syndication | 1993–1994 | Christopher Crowe Productions | Based on the 1987 film and its predecessor TV series |
| Big Wave Dave's | CBS | 1993 | Levine & Isaacs Productions | |
| Frasier | NBC | 1993–2004 | Grub Street Productions and Grammnet Productions (seasons 6–11, uncredited) | An expansion of Cheers |
| The Mommies | NBC | 1993–1995 | Speer-Grossman Productions | |
| The Jon Stewart Show | MTV/Syndication | 1993–1995 | Busboy Productions and MTV Productions | season 2 |
| South of Sunset | CBS | 1993 | Stan Rogow Productions and Byrum Power & Light | |
| Itsy Bitsy Spider | USA Network | 1994–1996 | Hyperion Animation | |
| Viper | NBC, Syndication | 1994–1999 | Pet Fly Productions | |
| Leeza | NBC, Syndication | 1994–2000 | Leeza Gibbons Enterprises | |
| The New Price is Right | Syndication | 1994–1995 | Mark Goodson Productions | (Note: Currently owned by Fremantle.) |
| Duckman | USA Network | 1994–1997 | Klasky Csupo and Reno & Osborn Productions | |
| The Busy World of Richard Scarry | Showtime; France 3 Children's BBC; Family Channel | 1994–1997 | CINAR, Beta Film (Germany), and Telefilm Canada | (Note: Currently owned by WildBrain.) |
| Sister, Sister | ABC, The WB | 1994–1999 | de Passe Entertainment | |
| Star Trek: Voyager | UPN | 1995–2001 | | Based on the 1966 series and its spin-off |
| The Watcher | UPN | 1995 | Christopher Crowe Productions | |
| Pig Sty | UPN | 1995 | Staley/Long Productions | |
| Platypus Man | UPN | 1995 | Fanaro-Nathan Productions | |
| The Marshal | ABC | 1995 | Buffalo Wallet Productions and Western Sandblast | |
| Marker | UPN | 1995 | Stephen J. Cannell Productions | Distribution only |
| Legend | UPN | 1995 | Gekko Film Corp. and Mike & Bill Productions | Distribution only |
| Almost Perfect | CBS | 1995–1996 | Robin Schiff Productions and Levine & Isaacs Productions | |
| The Pursuit of Happiness | NBC | 1995 | Grub Street Productions | |
| JAG | NBC/CBS | 1995–2005 | Belisarius Productions and NBC Productions (season 1) | |
| The Home Court | NBC | 1995–1996 | | |
| Good Company | CBS | 1996 | Staley/Long Productions | |
| Clueless | ABC/UPN | 1996–1999 | Cockamamie Productions | Based on the 1995 film |
| The Sentinel | UPN | 1996–1999 | Pet Fly Productions | |
| America's Dumbest Criminals | Syndication | 1996–2000 | | previously produced by Worldvision Enterprises; Currently distributed by FilmRise |
| Real TV | Syndication | 1996–2001 | RTV News Inc. | |
| Nash Bridges | CBS | 1996–2001 | The Don Johnson Company and Carlton Cuse Productions | previously produced by Rysher Entertainment |
| Arli$$ | HBO | 1996–2002 | HBO and Tollin/Robbins Productions | International distribution previously produced by Rysher Entertainment |
| Orleans | CBS | 1997 | Samoset Productions | |
| Fired Up | NBC | 1997–1998 | Grammnet Productions | |
| George and Leo | CBS | 1997–1998 | Staley/Long Productions | |
| Hitz | UPN | 1997 | Vaczy-Gamble Productions and MTV Productions | |
| Jenny | NBC | 1997–1998 | Mark & Howard Productions and MTV Productions | |
| Wild Things | Syndication | 1997–2000 | Earthview, Inc. and WT Productions | |
| Three | The WB | 1998 | MTV Productions | |
| The Secret Diary of Desmond Pfeiffer | UPN | 1998 | Fanaro-Nathan Productions | |
| LateLine | NBC/Showtime | 1998–1999 | Markus-Franken Productions | |
| The Howie Mandel Show | Syndication | 1998–1999 | 3 Arts Entertainment and Alevy Productions Inc. | |
| Maggie | Lifetime | 1998–1999 | Atomic Television | |
| DiResta | UPN | 1998–1999 | Maple Seed | |
| Encore! Encore! | NBC | 1998–1999 | Grub Street Productions | |
| Judge Mills Lane | Syndication | 1998–2001 | | previously produced by Rysher Entertainment |
| Seven Days | UPN | 1998–2001 | Crowe Entertainment | |
| Becker | CBS | 1998–2004 | Dave Hackel Productions and Industry Entertainment | |
| Love & Money | CBS | 1999–2000 | CBS Productions and Staley/Long Productions | |
| Relic Hunter | Syndication | 1999–2002 | CHUM Limited, ProSieben Media AG, M6, Rysher Entertainment Gaumont Television (seasons 1–2), Fireworks Entertainment Amy International Productions, Farrier Ltd. (season 3) and Groupe M6 | Currently distributed by Quiver Distribution |
| Hope Island | PAX TV | 1999–2000 | Lionsgate Television | Based on the 1996 TV series Ballykissangel by BBC |
| Now and Again | CBS | 1999–2000 | Picturemaker Productions and CBS Productions | |
| Soul Food: The Series | Showtime | 2000–2004 | Showtime Networks, Fox Television Studios, (seasons 1 and 2)/20th Century Fox Television (seasons 3–5) Water Walk Productions, Edmonds Entertainment and State Street Pictures | Based on the 1997 film |
| Grapevine | CBS | 2000 | CBS Productions | |
| Higher Ground | Fox Family | 2000 | Crescent Entertainment, Lions Gate Television and WIC Entertainment | Distributed in the U.S. by Lionsgate Television/Debmar-Mercury |
| The Trouble with Normal | ABC | 2000 | Garfield Grove Productions and Touchstone Television | |
| Level 9 | UPN | 2000–2001 | Sacret Productions | |
| Maximum Exposure | Syndication | 2000–2002 | First Television and RTV News Inc. | |
| Queen of Swords | Syndication; Global | 2000–2001 | Mercury Entertainment Corporation, Telefónica, Morena Films, Costume and Production Services Inc., Amy International Artists, Fireworks Entertainment and M6 | U.S. distributor Currently distributed by Quiver Distribution |
| That's Life | CBS | 2000–2002 | Film Noir | |
| One on One | UPN | 2001–2006 | The Greenblatt/Janollari Studio and Daddy's Girl Productions | |
| Manhunt | UPN | 2001 | | |
| Hot Ticket | Syndication | 2001–2004 | | |
| Some of My Best Friends | CBS | 2001 | Axelrod/Widdoes Entertainment | Based on the 1997 film Kiss Me, Guido by Paramount Pictures |
| Big Apple | CBS | 2001 | Red Board Productions and Yerkovich Productions | |
| Kristin | NBC | 2001 | Markusfarms Productions | |
| Men, Women & Dogs | The WB | 2001 | Staley/Long Productions | |
| Fling | Fox | 2001 | | |
| Star Trek: Enterprise | UPN | 2001–2005 | | Prequel to the 1966 TV series Star Trek |
| Philly | ABC | 2001–2002 | Steven Bochco Productions | |
| Rendez-View | Syndication | 2001–2002 | | |
| Wolf Lake | CBS | 2001–2002 | Cherry Pie Productions and Big Ticket Television | |
| Special Unit 2 | UPN | 2001–2002 | Rego Park Film and Television | |
| Raising Dad | The WB | 2001–2002 | Albion Productions | |
| In-Laws | NBC | 2002–2003 | Grammnet Productions and NBC Studios | |
| Andy Richter Controls the Universe | Fox | 2002–2003 | Garfield Grove Productions and 20th Century Fox Television | Distributed outside of the U.S. by Disney Media Distribution |
| Life Moments | Syndication | 2002–2003 | | |
| Dr. Phil | Syndication | 2002–2023 | Co-distributed with King World Productions | |
| First Monday | CBS | 2002 | Bellisarius Productions | |
| Do Over | The WB | 2002 | The Littlefield Company, 3 Hounds Productions and MHS Productions | |
| Bram & Alice | CBS | 2002 | Picador Productions and Knotty Entertainment | |
| The Random Years | UPN | 2002 | Big Phone Productions | |
| A Minute with Stan Hooper | Fox | 2003 | Bungalow 78 Productions | |
| Kingpin | NBC | 2003 | Knee Deep Productions, NBC Studios and Spelling Television | Distributed in the U.S. by NBCUniversal Syndication Studios |
| Keen Eddie | Fox | 2003–2004 | Frequency Films, Simon West Productions and The Littlefield Company | |
| Unexplained Mysteries | Syndication | 2003–2004 | | |
| It's All Relative | ABC | 2003–2004 | Storyline Entertainment, Naturally Blond Productions and Touchstone Television | |
| Deadwood | HBO | 2004–2006 | Red Board Productions | |
| Dance 360 | Syndication | 2004–2005 | C to the B Productions and Regan Jon Productions | |
| The Insider | Syndication | 2004–2017 | | Distributed from 2004 to 2006 |
| Second Time Around | UPN | 2004–2005 | Regan Jon Productions and C to the B Productions | |
| Medical Investigation | NBC | 2004–2005 | Landscape Entertainment and NBC Universal Television Studio | Distributed outside of the U.S. by NBCUniversal Syndication Studios. |
| Threshold | CBS | 2005–2006 | Braga Productions, Heyday Films and Phantom Four Films | |
| Cuts | UPN | 2005–2006 | The Greenblatt/Janollari Studio, Penrose Productions and Daddy's Girl Productions | |
| Love, Inc. | UPN | 2005–2006 | Chase T.V., Burg Koules Television and The Littlefield Company | |
| The Bad Girl's Guide | UPN | 2005 | Flame Ventures | |
| Sex, Love & Secrets | UPN | 2005 | The Jonathan Axelrod and Kelly Edwards Company | |
| Life on a Stick | Fox | 2005 | Garfield Grove Productions | |
| Blind Justice | ABC | 2005 | Steven Bochco Productions | |
| Out of Practice | CBS | 2005–2006 | Knotty Entertainment and Picador Productions | |
| Love Monkey | CBS | 2006 | 34 Films, Gran Via Productions and Sony Pictures Television | Distributed outside of the U.S. by Sony Pictures Television |
| South Beach | UPN | 2006 | Flame Television, Nuyorican Productions and 44 Blue Productions | |
| Courting Alex | CBS | 2006 | April Fools Productions and Touchstone Television | |

===== Desilu Productions =====
| Title | Genre | Years | Network | Notes |
|---|---|---|---|---|
| I Love Lucy | Sitcom | 1951–57 | CBS | distributed by CBS Television Film Sales |
| Our Miss Brooks | Sitcom | 1952–56 | CBS | distributed by CBS Television Film Sales |
| Willy | Sitcom | 1954–55 | CBS | |
| Shower of Stars | Variety | 1954–58 | CBS | |
| December Bride | Sitcom | 1954–59 | CBS | distributed by CBS Television Film Sales (renamed CBS Films in 1958) |
| The Life and Legend of Wyatt Earp | Western | 1955–61 | ABC | co-production with Wyatt Earp Enterprises |
| The Adventures of Jim Bowie | Western | 1956–58 | ABC | co-production with Jim Bowie Enterprises |
| The Sheriff of Cochise | Western | 1956–60 | Syndication | co-production with National Telefilm Associates |
| Whirlybirds | Adventure | 1957–60 | Syndication | distributed by CBS Films/Viacom |
| Official Detective | Anthology | 1957–58 | Syndication | co-production with National Telefilm Associates |
| The Walter Winchell File | Anthology | 1957–58 | ABC | co-production with National Telefilm Associates |
| The Lucy–Desi Comedy Hour | Variety | 1957–60 | CBS | distributed by CBS Television Film Sales (renamed CBS Films in 1958) |
| The Texan | Western | 1958–60 | CBS | co-production with Rorvic Productions |
| Westinghouse Desilu Playhouse | Anthology | 1958–60 | CBS | |
| The Ann Sothern Show | Sitcom | 1958–61 | CBS | co-production with Anso Productions currently owned by 20th Television |
| This Is Alice | Sitcom | 1958–59 | NTA Film Network | co-production with National Telefilm Associates |
| The Untouchables | Police drama | 1959–63 | ABC | co-production with Langford Productions Inc. |
| Guestward, Ho! | Sitcom | 1960–61 | ABC | |
| Angel | Sitcom | 1960–61 | CBS | co-production with Burlingame Productions and CBS Films |
| Harrigan and Son | Sitcom | 1960–61 | ABC | |
| Fair Exchange | Sitcom | 1962–1963 | CBS | co-production with Cy Howard Productions |
| The Lucy Show | Sitcom | 1962–68 | CBS | Desilu produced up to its sale to Gulf+Western (during season six) |
| You Don't Say! | Game show | 1963–69 | NBC | co-production with Ralph Andrews-Bill Yagemann Productions Desilu produced up to its sale to Gulf+Western (during season five) |
| The Greatest Show on Earth | Drama | 1963–64 | ABC | co-production with Ringling Bros., Barnum and Bailey Television, and Cody Productions |
| Glynis | Sitcom | 1963 | CBS | |
| Star Trek | Science fiction | 1966–68 | NBC | co-production with Norway Corporation Desilu produced up to its sale to Gulf+Western (during season two) |
| Mission: Impossible | Secret agent drama | 1966–68 | CBS | Desilu produced up to its sale to Gulf+Western (during season two) |
| Mannix | Crime drama | 1967–68 | CBS | Desilu produced up to its sale to Gulf+Western (during season one) |

===== Viacom Enterprises =====
| Title | Years | Network | Notes |
|---|---|---|---|
| My Three Sons | 1960–1972 | ABC/CBS | distributor; produced by Don Fedderson Productions; Represented by MCA TV from 1960 to 1965, then in association with CBS from 1965 to 1972. Viacom has distributed the entire series in separate packages, although the majority of the color CBS episodes (Seasons 6–10) are the ones that are syndicated today. Most of the earlier black-and-white shows were not syndicated until they began airing on MeTV in 2017. CBS currently distributes all 380 episodes produced. |
| What's My Line? | 1968–1975 | Syndication | distributor; produced by Mark Goodson-Bill Todman Productions |
| The Mary Tyler Moore Show | 1970–1977 | CBS | distributor; produced by MTM Enterprises; Currently owned by 20th Television |
| All in the Family | 1971–1979 | CBS | distributor; produced by Tandem Productions (Note: Currently owned by Sony Pictures Television) |
| The Bob Newhart Show | 1972–1978 | CBS | distributor; produced by MTM Enterprises; Currently owned by 20th Television |
| The Rookies | 1972–1976 | ABC | previously distributed by Worldvision Enterprises; produced by Spelling-Goldberg Productions |
| The Barkleys | 1972–1973 | NBC | with DePatie–Freleng Enterprises; In the public domain |
| The Houndcats | 1972–1973 | NBC | with DePatie–Freleng Enterprises; In the public domain |
| Ozzie's Girls | 1972–1974 | Syndication | distributor; produced by Filmways |
| The (Nighttime) Price Is Right | 1972–1980 | Syndication | |
| Doc Elliot | 1973–1974 | ABC | International distributor; produced by Lorimar Television (Note: Currently owned by Warner Bros. Television Studios.) |
| The Harlem Globetrotters Popcorn Machine | 1974–1975 | CBS | with Funhouse Productions and Yongestreet Productions |
| Apple's Way | 1974–1975 | CBS | International distributor; produced by Lorimar Television |
| Korg: 70,000 B.C. | 1974–1975 | ABC | International distributor; produced by Hanna-Barbera Productions; Later distributed by The Program Exchange and Worldvision Enterprises |
| The $25,000 Pyramid | 1974–1979 | Syndication | distributor; produced by Bob Stewart Productions |
| The Blue Knight | 1975–1976 | CBS | International distributor; produced by Lorimar Television |
| The Oddball Couple | 1975–1977 | ABC | distributor; produced by DePatie-Freleng Enterprises |
| The $128,000 Question | 1976–1978 | Syndication | with Cinelar Associates |
| The Life and Times of Grizzly Adams | 1977–1978 | NBC | distributor; produced by Sunn Classic Pictures |
| Family Feud | 1977–1985 | Syndication | distributor; produced by Mark Goodson-Bill Todman Productions |
| The Love Experts | 1978–1979 | Syndication | with Bob Stewart Productions |
| You Don't Say! | 1978–1979 | Syndication | with Ralph Andrews Productions |
| Amigo and Friends | 1979–1982 | Syndication | distributor; produced by Televisa (current owner) and Hanna-Barbera Productions |
| To Tell the Truth | 1980–1981 | Syndication | distributor; produced by Mark Goodson-Bill Todman Productions |
| The Cosby Show | 1984–1992 | NBC | distributor; produced by Carsey-Werner Productions (current owner) and Bill Cosby |
| Star Games | 1985–1986 | Syndication | co-production with Company III Productions |
| Split Second | 1986–1987 | Syndication | distributor; produced by Stefan Hatos-Monty Hall Productions |
| Adventures of the Little Koala | 1987 | Nickelodeon | English dub production with Cinar Films; originally produced in Japan by Topcraft |
| A Different World | 1987–1993 | NBC | distributor; produced by Carsey-Werner Productions (current owner) and Bill Cosby |
| Double Dare | 1988–1989 | Syndication | distribution; co-production with Nickelodeon |
| Finders Keepers | 1988–1989 | Syndication | with Nickelodeon and Fox Television Stations |
| Superboy | 1988–1992 | Syndication | with Alexander and Ilya Salkind Productions, Cantharus Productions, Lowry Productions and DC Comics; Warner Bros. currently handles home media and international distribution |
| Roseanne | 1988–1997 | ABC | distributor; produced by Wind Dancer Productions (season 1), Full Moon and High Tide Productions (seasons 7–9) and in association with The Carsey-Werner Company (current owner) |
| Remote Control | 1989–1990 | Syndication | distribution; co-production with MTV |
| The Super Mario Bros. Super Show! | 1989–1990 | Syndication | distributor; produced by Nintendo of America and DIC Entertainment |
| Super Force | 1990–1992 | Syndication | with Premiere Limited Productions |
| Lightning Force | 1991–1992 | Syndication | distributor; produced by Crescent Entertainment and Chesler-Perlmutter Productions |
| Johnny B... On the Loose | 1991 | Syndication | distributor; produced by Brandmeier Productions, The Pierce/Silverman Company and NBC Productions |

===== Viacom Productions =====
| Title | Years | Network | Notes |
|---|---|---|---|
| The MacKenzies of Paradise Cove | 1979 | ABC | with Blinn/Thorpe Productions |
| The Lazarus Syndrome | 1979 | ABC | with Blinn/Thorpe Productions |
| Dear Detective | 1979 | CBS | with Kibee-Hargrove Productions |
| The New Adventures of Mighty Mouse and Heckle & Jeckle | 1979–1981 | CBS | with Filmation |
| East of Eden | 1981 | ABC | miniseries; with Mace Neufeld Productions |
| American Dream | 1981 | ABC | with Mace Neufeld Productions |
| Nurse | 1981–1982 | CBS | with Robert Halmi, Inc. |
| The Devlin Connection | 1982 | NBC | co-produced by Jerry Thorpe Productions and Mammoth Films, Inc. |
| Amanda's | 1983 | ABC | Based on the TV series Fawlty Towers by the BBC co-produced with E & L Productions |
| Ace Crawford, Private Eye | 1983 | CBS | co-produced with Conway Enterprises |
| The Master | 1984 | NBC | co-produced by Michael Sloan Productions |
| Me and Mom | 1985 | ABC | co-production with Hal Sitowitz Productions |
| Easy Street | 1986–1987 | NBC | |
| What a Country! | 1986–1987 | Syndication | Based on the TV series Mind Your Language by London Weekend Television with Ripstar Productions, Primetime Entertainment and Tribune Entertainment |
| Matlock | 1986–1995 | NBC/ABC | with InterMedia Entertainment Company (1986–1987), The Fred Silverman Company (1987–1995), Strathmore Productions (seasons 1–2) and Dean Hargrove Productions (seasons 3–9) |
| Frank's Place | 1987–1988 | CBS | |
| Mighty Mouse: The New Adventures | 1987–1988 | CBS | with Bakshi-Hyde Ventures and Terrytoons |
| Jake and the Fatman | 1987–1992 | CBS | with The Fred Silverman Company, Strathmore Productions (1987–1988) and Dean Hargrove Productions (1988–1992) |
| Father Dowling Mysteries | 1987–1991 | NBC/ABC | with The Fred Silverman Company and Dean Hargrove Productions |
| Snoops | 1989–1990 | CBS | with Tima Love Productions and Solt/Egan Company |
| Max Monroe: Loose Cannon | 1990 | CBS | co-produced by Dean Hargrove Productions |
| The Marshall Chronicles | 1990 | ABC | co-produced by Jay Kleckner for Sweetum Productions |
| Flying Blind | 1992–1993 | Fox | Co-produced by Sweetum Productions |
| Key West | 1993 | Fox | with Stonehenge Productions |
| Diagnosis: Murder | 1993–2001 | CBS | with The Fred Silverman Company and Dean Hargrove Productions |
| Deadly Games | 1995–1997 | UPN | with Shaken not Stirred Productions and Rumbleshake Productions |
| The Adventures of Corduroy | 1996–1997 | Direct-to-video | co-produced by Benjamin Productions, Lin Oliver Productions, Inc. and Graz Entertainment, Inc. |
| Sabrina, the Teenage Witch | 1996–2003 | ABC/The WB | with Archie Comics, Hartbreak Films and Finishing The Hat Productions (season 1) |
| Linc's | 1998–2000 | Showtime | with Tim Reid Productions and Showtime Networks |
| The Hoop Life | 1999–2000 | Showtime | co-produced by Showtime Networks, Hardwood Productions and The Levinson/Fontana Company |
| The Beat | 2000 | UPN | with The Levinson/Fontana Company |
| Ed | 2000–2004 | NBC | with NBC Studios and Worldwide Pants |
| The Division | 2001–2004 | Lifetime | with Kedzie Productions |
| Strange Frequency | 2001 | VH1 | with Once & Future Films and Broadway Video |
| Baby Bob | 2002–2003 | CBS | with Scribbler's Pillory Productions |
| Haunted | 2002 | UPN | with Industry Entertainment and CBS Productions |
| Jake 2.0 | 2003–2004 | UPN | with David Greenwalt Productions, Matthews/Scharbo Productions and Silent H Productions |
| The Handler | 2003–2004 | CBS | with Haddock Entertainment |

==== CBS Productions ====
Most pre-1976 series produced by CBS or distributed by CBS Films were later distributed by Viacom and Paramount Television, then eventually came back full-circle to CBS in 2006. Alternatively known as CBS Entertainment Productions from 1978 to 1995.

| Title | Original run | Network | Notes |
|---|---|---|---|
| Studio One | 1948–1958 | CBS | |
| Lamp Unto My Feet | 1948–1979 | CBS | |
| What's My Line? | 1950–1967 | CBS | 1958-67 episodes, co-production with Mark Goodson-Bill Todman Productions; currently owned by Fremantle |
| The Amos 'n Andy Show | 1951–1953 | CBS | |
| Art Linkletter's House Party | 1952–1969 | CBS | |
| I've Got a Secret | 1952-1967 | CBS | 1960-67 episodes, produced by Telecast Enterprises, show currently owned by Fremantle, format owned by Werner Entertainment |
| Our Miss Brooks | 1952–1956 | CBS | |
| You Are There | 1953–1957; 1971–1972 | CBS | |
| The Red Skelton Show | 1953–1970 | CBS | co-production with Van Bernard Productions and Sursum Productions; 1962–71 episodes currently owned by Red Skelton Productions |
| Make Room for Daddy/The Danny Thomas Show | 1953–1964 | ABC/CBS | Produced by Marterto Enterprises and T&L Productions; Currently distributed by SFM Entertainment |
| Eye on New York | 1953–1971 | CBS; WCBS | |
| The Search | 1954–1955 | CBS | |
| The Whistler | 1954–1955 | CBS | |
| The Lineup | 1954–1960 | CBS | |
| Look Up and Live | 1954–1979 | CBS | |
| Navy Log | 1955–1958 | CBS/ABC | |
| The Millionaire | 1955–1960 | CBS | distribution only; produced by Silverstone Films, Don Fedderson Productions and MCA TV |
| Let's Take A Trip | 1955–1958 | CBS | |
| Gunsmoke | 1955–1975 | CBS | with Arness & Company (season 6), The Arness Production Company (seasons 7–9) and Filmaster Productions |
| The Honeymooners | 1955–56 & beyond | CBS | the "Classic 39" shows, produced by Jackie Gleason Enterprises, distributed by CBS Films, then Viacom; CBS owns the classic series outright, while the Gleason company owns the "lost episodes", but CBS distributes both packages; other Honeymooners material after this period are handled by the Gleason company and Paul Brownstein Productions |
| The Phil Silvers Show | 1955–1959 | CBS | |
| Camera Three | 1956–1979 | CBS | |
| Air Power | 1956–1957 | CBS | |
| The Gray Ghost | 1957–1958 | Syndication | with Lindsley Parsons Picture Corporation |
| Trackdown | 1957–1959 | CBS | with Four Star Films |
| Have Gun–Will Travel | 1957–1963 | CBS | |
| Perry Mason | 1957–1966 | CBS | with Paisano Productions |
| The Twentieth Century | 1957–1967 | CBS | |
| Leonard Bernstein's Young People's Concerts | 1958–1972 | CBS | |
| Border Patrol | 1959 | Syndication | Produced by Chris-Jane Gallu Productions, Inc. in association with CBS Films |
| Hotel de Paree | 1959–1960 | CBS | |
| Rawhide | 1959–1965 | CBS | |
| The Twilight Zone | 1959–1964 | CBS | with Cayuga Productions, Inc. |
| The Andy Griffith Show | 1960–1968 | CBS | Produced by Mayberry Enterprises |
| Angel | 1960–1961 | CBS | Produced by Burligame Productions in association with CBS Films |
| The Brothers Brannagan | 1960–1961 | Syndication | Produced by CBS Films |
| Gunslinger | 1961 | CBS | |
| Way Out | 1961 | CBS | co-produced with Talent Associates |
| The Alvin Show | 1961–1962 | CBS | produced by Bagdasarian Film Corporation and Format Films; Home entertainment rights are owned by Bagdasarian Productions |
| The Defenders | 1961–1965 | CBS | with Plautus Productions |
| The Dick Van Dyke Show | 1961–1966 | CBS | Produced by Calvada Productions; Currently distributed by Paul Brownstein Productions |
| Oh! Those Bells | 1962 | CBS | |
| The Beverly Hillbillies | 1962–1971 | CBS | co-produced by Filmways |
| The Great Adventure | 1963–1964 | CBS | |
| Petticoat Junction | 1963–1970 | CBS | co-produced by Filmways |
| The Baileys of Balboa | 1964–1965 | CBS | produced by Richielieu Productions |
| Gilligan's Island | 1964–1967 | CBS | Co-produced with Gladasya Productions and United Artists Television; Owned by Warner Bros. through Turner Entertainment |
| The Reporter | 1964 | CBS | produced by Richielieu Productions |
| Gomer Pyle, U.S.M.C. | 1964–1969 | CBS | co-produced with T & L Productions, Ashland Productions and Andy Griffith Enterprises |
| The Trials of O'Brien | 1965–1966 | CBS | Produced by Filmways |
| The Wild Wild West | 1965–1969 | with Michael Garrison Productions | |
| Get Smart | 1965–1970 | NBC/CBS | season 5 only; with Talent Associates; HBO/Warner Bros. Television owns home entertainment and international distribution rights |
| Run, Buddy, Run | 1966–1967 | CBS | with Talent Associates |
| Family Affair | 1966–1971 | CBS | produced by Don Fedderson Productions; Distributed by CBS Television Distribution in the United States, while international distribution is handled by NBCUniversal Syndication Studios and home video rights owned by MPI Media Group via MPI Home Video |
| The 21st Century | 1967–1970 | CBS | |
| Coronet Blue | 1967 | CBS | with Plautus Productions |
| Dundee and the Culhane | 1967 | CBS | co-produced by Filmways; Currently owned by MGM Television |
| Cimarron Strip | 1967–1968 | CBS | with Stuart Whitman, Inc. |
| He & She | 1967–1968 | CBS | with Talent Associates |
| Gentle Ben | 1967–1969 | CBS | produced by Ivan Tors Films |
| CBS Playhouse | 1967–1970 | CBS | |
| The Good Guys | 1968–1970 | CBS | with Talent Associates |
| Hawaii Five-O | 1968–1980 | CBS | with Leonard Freeman Productions |
| The Glen Campbell Goodtime Hour | 1969–1972 | CBS | with Glenco Productions |
| The Governor & J.J. | 1969–1970 | CBS | with Talent Associates-Norton Simon |
| Harlem Globetrotters | 1970–1971 | CBS | with Hanna-Barbera Productions |
| Storefront Lawyers | 1970 | CBS | with Leonard Freeman Enterprises Productions and National General Corporation |
| Adventure | 1970–1971 | CBS | |
| The American Parade | 1974–1976 | CBS | |
| Dirty Sally | 1974 | CBS | |
| The Lives of Benjamin Franklin | 1974 | CBS | |
| Khan! | 1975 | CBS | |
| Spencer's Pilots | 1976 | CBS | with Sweeney-Finnegan Productions; Previously distributed by Worldvision Enterprises |
| Ball Four | 1976 | CBS | co-production with Time Life Television |
| The Andros Targets | 1977 | CBS | Previously distributed by Worldvision Enterprises |
| Signature | 1981–1982 | CBS Cable | |
| An American Portrait | 1984–1986 | CBS | interstitial series |
| CBS Storybreak | 1985–1989; 1993–1994 | CBS | with Southern Star Productions and Hanna-Barbera Australia |
| Foley Square | 1985–1986 | CBS | with Shukovsky English Entertainment |
| The Twilight Zone | 1985–1989 | CBS | with London Films, Persistence of Vision (seasons 1–2) and Atlantis Films (season 3) |
| If Tomorrow Comes | 1986 | CBS | miniseries |
| Garbage Pail Kids | 1987 | N/A | |
| The Adventures of Raggedy Ann and Andy | 1988 | CBS | |
| Blue Skies | 1988 | CBS | with McKeand Productions |
| The Pat Sajak Show | 1989–1990 | CBS | |
| Wolf | 1989–1990 | CBS | co-produced by Holcomb/Peckinpah Productions |
| Rescue 911 | 1989–1996 | CBS | Distributed for U.S. television by MTM Enterprises (currently Disney–ABC Domestic Television) in association with Arnold Shapiro Productions |
| City | 1990 | CBS | with MTM Enterprises |
| Bagdad Cafe | 1990–1991 | CBS | Based on the 1987 film by Island Pictures with Mort Lachman and Associates, Zev Braun Pictures, and New World Television |
| Top Cops | 1990–1993 | CBS | with Grosso-Jacobson Productions |
| Evening Shade | 1990–1994 | CBS | with Bloodworth-Thomason Mozark Productions and Burt Reynolds Productions; Distributed for U.S. television by MTM Enterprises (currently Disney-ABC Domestic Television) |
| You Take the Kids | 1990–1991 | CBS | with Paul Haggis Productions and MTM Enterprises |
| True Detectives | 1990–1991 | CBS | with Arnold Shapiro Productions |
| Riders in the Sky | 1991 | CBS | |
| P.S. I Luv U | 1991–1992 | CBS | with Glen A. Larson Productions |
| The Hollywood Game | 1991–1992 | CBS | with Pasta Productions & Rastar Television |
| Night Games | 1991–1992 | CBS | |
| Intruders | 1992 | CBS | miniseries; with Dan Curtis Productions and Osiris Films |
| Grapevine | 1992 | CBS | with Corkscrew Productions and MGM Television |
| The Boys | 1993 | CBS | with Hughes O'Shannon Productions |
| The Building | 1993 | CBS | with Bob & Alice Productions, Worldwide Pants and Columbia Pictures Television |
| Dave's World | 1993–1997 | CBS | with The Producers Entertainment Group Ltd./Axelrod-Widdoes Productions, Fred Barron Productions, Livestock Productions (seasons 1–2) and Kitten in the Oven Productions (seasons 3–4) |
| Walker, Texas Ranger | 1993–2001 | CBS | with Cannon Television (1993), Top Kick Productions (seasons 1–5), Norris Brothers Entertainment (seasons 6–8), The Ruddy/Greif Company and Columbia Pictures Television; Distributed for U.S. television by Sony Pictures Television |
| Dr. Quinn, Medicine Woman | 1993–1998 | CBS | Distributed for U.S. television by MTM Enterprises/20th Television (currently Disney Platform Distribution) with The Sullivan Company |
| Shame on You | 1993 | CBS | four specials |
| Ned Blessing: The Story of My Life and Times | 1993 | CBS | with Wittliff/Pangaea and Hearst Entertainment |
| The Road Home | 1994 | CBS | with The Paltrow Group |
| Traps | 1994 | CBS | with Stephen J. Cannell Productions |
| The Gordon Elliott Show | 1994–1997 | Syndication | with 20th Television |
| Touched by an Angel | 1994–2003 | CBS | with Moon Water Productions |
| Under One Roof | 1995 | CBS | with The Thomas Carter Company |
| Buffalo Girls | 1995 | CBS | mini-series |
| Central Park West | 1995–1996 | CBS | with Darren Star Productions |
| Can't Hurry Love | 1995–1996 | CBS | with The Producers Entertainment Group Ltd./Axelrod–Widdoes Productions and TriStar Television co-owned with Sony Pictures Television |
| Bonnie | 1995–1996 | CBS | with Bob & Alice Productions and Worldwide Pants |
| Caroline in the City | 1995–1999 | NBC | with Barron/Pennette Productions and 3 Sisters Entertainment |
| Nothing Lasts Forever | 1995 | CBS | miniseries |
| Moloney | 1996–1997 | CBS | with TriStar Television, Predawn Productions and Three Putt Productions |
| Promised Land | 1996–1999 | CBS | with Moon Water Productions |
| Early Edition | 1996–2000 | CBS | with Three Characters Productions (seasons 1–2), Angelica Films (season 1–2), and TriStar Television (season 1)/Columbia TriStar Television (seasons 2–4); Distributed outside of the U.S. by Sony Pictures Television |
| The Gregory Hines Show | 1997–1998 | CBS | with Katlin/Bernstein Productions, Darric Productions and Columbia TriStar Television |
| Brooklyn South | 1997–1998 | CBS | with Steven Bochco Productions |
| To Have & to Hold | 1998 | CBS | with The Greenblatt/Janollari Studio and Fox Television Studios |
| Maggie Winters | 1998–1999 | CBS | with The Greenblatt/Janollari Studio and Fox Television Studios |
| L.A. Doctors | 1998–1999 | CBS | with Columbia TriStar Television and Johnson/Hancock Productions |
| Kids Say the Darndest Things | 1998–2000 | CBS | with LMNO Productions and Linkletter/Atkins/Kritzer Productions Inc. |
| Martial Law | 1998–2000 | CBS | with Carlton Cuse Productions, Ruddy Morgan Productions and 20th Century Fox Television; Distributed in the U.S. by Disney Platform Distribution |
| Sons of Thunder | 1999 | CBS | with Norris Brothers Entertainment |
| Work with Me | 1999 | CBS | with Stephen Engel Productions, Calm Down Productions, Nat's Eye Productions and Studios USA Television |
| Now and Again | 1999–2000 | CBS | with Paramount Television and Picturemaker Productions |
| Love & Money | 1999–2000 | CBS | with Paramount Television |
| Ladies Man | 1999–2001 | CBS | with Columbia TriStar Television, Christopher Thompson Productions and Victor Levin Productions |
| Family Law | 1999–2002 | CBS | with Columbia TriStar Television and Paul Haggis Productions; Distributed outside of the U.S. by Sony Pictures Television |
| Judging Amy | 1999–2005 | CBS | with Barbara Hall-Joseph Stern Productions and 20th Century Fox Television; Distributed in the U.S. by Disney Platform Distribution |
| City of Angels | 2000 | CBS | with Steven Bochco Productions |
| Bette | 2000–2001 | CBS | with D-Train Productions, All Girl Productions, and Columbia TriStar Television |
| Welcome to New York | 2000–2001 | CBS | with Worldwide Pants, Crazy Canyon Productions, and Studios USA Television |
| The District | 2000–2004 | CBS | with Di Novi Pictures and Studios USA/Universal Television |
| Yes, Dear | 2000–2006 | CBS | with Amigos de Garcia Productions, Cherry Tree Entertainment and 20th Century Fox Television; Distributed in the U.S. by Disney Platform Distribution |
| Kate Brasher | 2001 | CBS | with Jersey Television and 20th Century Fox Television |
| The Education of Max Bickford | 2001–2002 | CBS | with Joe Cacaci Productions, Sugar Mama Productions, Regency Television, and 20th Century Fox Television; Distributed in the U.S. by Disney Platform Distribution |
| The Ellen Show | 2001–2002 | CBS | with The Hurwitz Company and Columbia TriStar Television |
| The Agency | 2001–2003 | CBS | with Shaun Cassidy Productions, Radiant Productions and Studios USA/Universal Television |
| The Guardian | 2001–2004 | CBS | with David Hollander Productions, Gran Via Productions and Columbia TriStar Television/Sony Pictures Television; Distributed outside of the U.S. by Sony Pictures Television |
| Haunted | 2002 | UPN | with Industry Entertainment and Viacom Productions |
| Hack | 2002–2004 | CBS | with Pariah Television and Big Ticket Television |
| Still Standing | 2002–2006 | CBS | with Tea Gal and Java Boy Productions and 20th Century Fox Television; Distributed in the U.S. by Disney Platform Distribution |
| Abby | 2003 | UPN | with Katlin/Bernstein Productions |
| Queens Supreme | 2003 | CBS | with Shoelace Productions, Spelling Television, Red Om Films, Revolution Studios and Shadowland Productions |
| Charlie Lawrence | 2003 | CBS | with Jeffrey Richman Productions and 20th Century Fox Television |
| Star Search | 2003–2004 | CBS | with 2929 Entertainment and A.Gold.er Productions |
| Joan of Arcadia | 2003–2005 | CBS | with Barbara Hall Productions and Sony Pictures Television; Distributed outside of the U.S. by Sony Pictures Television |
| Listen Up | 2004–2005 | CBS | with Regency Television and Fox Television Studios; Distributed in the U.S. by Disney Platform Distribution |
| Center of the Universe | 2004–2005 | CBS | with The Tannenbaum Company and Warner Bros. Television |
| dr. vegas | 2004 | CBS | with Bender Brown Productions and Warner Bros. Television; Co-owned by Warner Bros. Television |
| The Cleaner | 2008–2009 | A&E | with Once a Frog Productions |
| The Beautiful Life | 2009 | The CW | with Katalyst Films, Page Fright Productions and Warner Bros. Television |
| Melrose Place | 2009–2010 | The CW | with Slavkin/Swimmer |
| Accidentally on Purpose | 2009–2010 | CBS | with BermanBraun |
| Three Rivers | 2009–2010 | CBS | with Fixed Mark Productions |
| Life Unexpected | 2010–2011 | The CW | with Best Day Ever Productions, Mojo Films and Warner Bros. Television |
| The Defenders | 2010–2011 | CBS | with Carol Mendelsohn Productions |
| How to Be a Gentleman | 2011–2012 | CBS | with MRC |
| Ringer | 2011–2012 | The CW | with Green Eggs and Pam Productions, Brillstein Entertainment Partners, ABC Studios and Warner Bros. Television |
| ¡Rob! | 2012 | CBS | with The Tannenbaum Company |
| NYC 22 | 2012 | CBS | with TriBeCa Productions and Post 109 Productions |
| CSI: Cyber | 2015–2016 | CBS | with Jerry Bruckheimer Television and Content Partners LLC |

===== Terrytoons =====
| Title | Original run | Network | Notes |
|---|---|---|---|
| Terrytoons | 1929–1971 | Theatrical | |
| Barker Bill's Cartoon Show | 1953–1955 | CBS | |
| Mighty Mouse Playhouse | 1955–1962 | CBS | |
| Tom Terrific | 1957 | CBS | shown as part of Captain Kangaroo |
| Deputy Dawg | 1960–1964 | Syndication | |
| The Adventures of Lariat Sam | 1962 | CBS | shown as part of Captain Kangaroo |
| Mighty Mouse and The Mighty Heroes | 1966–1967 | CBS | |
| Sally Sargent | 1968 | Syndication | pilot for a TV series |

===== UPN Kids =====
| Title | Airdate | Network | Notes |
|---|---|---|---|
| Bureau of Alien Detectors | 1996 | UPN | co-production with Saban Entertainment rights co-owned with The Walt Disney Company |
| The Mouse and the Monster | 1996–1997 | UPN | co-production with Saban Entertainment rights co-owned with The Walt Disney Company |

==== Spelling Television ====
Formerly known as Aaron Spelling Productions and Spelling Entertainment Inc.

| Title | Original run | Network | Notes |
|---|---|---|---|
| The Danny Thomas Hour | 1967–1968 | NBC | previously distributed by William Morris Agency and NBC Films |
| Rango | 1967 | ABC | with Timkel Productions previously distributed by William Morris Agency and ABC Films |
| The Guns of Will Sonnett | 1967–1969 | ABC | with Bremco Productions previously distributed by William Morris Agency, NBC Films, Leo A. Gutman, Inc. and King World |
| The Mod Squad | 1968–1973 | ABC | previously distributed by ABC Films |
| The New People | 1969–1970 | ABC | previously distributed by ABC Films |
| The Most Deadly Game | 1970–1971 | ABC | previously distributed by ABC Films |
| The Silent Force | 1970–1971 | ABC | previously distributed by ABC Films |
| The San Pedro Beach Bums | 1977 | ABC | |
| The Love Boat | 1977–1986 | ABC | with Douglas S. Cramer Productions distributed by Worldvision Enterprises |
| Vega$ | 1978–1981 | ABC | previously distributed by 20th Century Fox Television |
| Friends | 1979 | ABC | |
| B.A.D. Cats | 1980 | ABC | |
| Aloha Paradise | 1981 | ABC | |
| Dynasty | 1981–1989 | ABC | with Fox-Cat Productions (pilot) Richard and Esther Shapiro Productions previously distributed by 20th Century Fox Television |
| Strike Force | 1981–1982 | ABC | |
| Matt Houston | 1982–1985 | ABC | with Largo Productions previously distributed by Warner Bros. Television |
| At Ease | 1983 | ABC | |
| Hotel | 1983–1988 | ABC | previously distributed by Warner Bros. Television |
| Finder of Lost Loves | 1984–1985 | ABC | |
| Glitter | 1984–1985 | ABC | |
| MacGruder and Loud | 1985 | ABC | |
| Hollywood Beat | 1985 | ABC | |
| The Colbys | 1985–1987 | ABC | with Richard and Esther Shapiro Productions previously distributed by Warner Bros. Television |
| Life with Lucy | 1986 | ABC | with Lucille Ball Productions; CBS co-owns the series with Desilu Too, LLC. |
| HeartBeat | 1988–1989 | ABC | with Richard and Esther Shapiro Productions |
| Nightingales | 1989 | NBC | |
| Beverly Hills, 90210 | 1990–2000 | Fox | with 90210 Productions Inc., Propaganda Films (seasons 1–2) and Torand Productions |
| Twin Peaks | 1990–1991 | ABC | with Lynch/Frost Productions and Propaganda Films |
| 2000 Malibu Road | 1992 | CBS | with Fisher Entertainment and Joel Schumacher Productions |
| The Heights | 1992 | Fox | |
| The Round Table | 1992 | NBC | |
| Melrose Place | 1992–1999 | Fox | with Darren Star Productions |
| Burke's Law | 1994–1995 | CBS | Based on the 1963 TV series by Four Star Television |
| Winnetka Road | 1994 | NBC | |
| Models Inc. | 1994–1995 | Fox | |
| Madman of the People | 1994–1995 | NBC | with Kreiscluesco Industries |
| Robin's Hoods | 1994–1995 | Syndication | |
| Heaven Help Us | 1994 | Syndication | with Echo Cove Productions |
| University Hospital | 1995 | Syndication | |
| Kindred: The Embraced | 1996 | Fox | with John Leekley Productions |
| Malibu Shores | 1996 | NBC | |
| Savannah | 1996–1997 | The WB | |
| 7th Heaven | 1996–2007 | The WB/The CW | CBS Paramount Network Television co-produced the final season. |
| Pacific Palisades | 1997 | Fox | |
| Sunset Beach | 1997–1999 | NBC | with NBC Studios and Spelling Daytime Television |
| Love Boat: The Next Wave | 1998–1999 | UPN | |
| Any Day Now | 1998–2002 | Lifetime | with Finnegan/Pinchuk Productions and Paid Our Dues Productions |
| Charmed | 1998–2006 | The WB | |
| Buddy Faro | 1998 | CBS | with Uncle Monkey Productions |
| Rescue 77 | 1999 | The WB | |
| Titans | 2000 | NBC | with NBC Studios |
| All Souls | 2001 | UPN | with Uncle Monkey Productions |
| Kingpin | 2003 | NBC | with Knee Deep Productions and NBC Studios |
| Queens Supreme | 2003 | CBS | with Shoelace Productions, Revolution Television, Red Om Films, Shadowland Productions and CBS Productions |
| 10-8: Officers on Duty | 2003–2004 | ABC | with Spine Films, Touchstone Television and Badlands Entertainment |
| Summerland | 2004–2005 | The WB | with Baby Owl Works Productions, The Lion and the Rose Productions (season 1) |
| Clubhouse | 2004–2005 | CBS | with Icon Productions |
| Wanted | 2005 | TNT | with Badlands Entertainment |

===== Laurel Entertainment =====
| Title | Original run | Network | Notes |
|---|---|---|---|
| Tales from the Darkside | 1983–1988 | Syndication | with Tribune Broadcasting and Jaygee Productions distributed by Paramount Domestic Television & LBS Communications |
| Monsters | 1988–1991 | Syndication | co-produced and distributed by Tribune Entertainment Company |
| Golden Years | 1991 | CBS | miniseries |
| The Stand | 1994 | ABC | miniseries; co-produced by Greengrass Productions |
| The Langoliers | 1995 | ABC | miniseries |

===== Worldvision Enterprises =====
| Title | Original run | Network | Notes |
|---|---|---|---|
| That Girl | 1966–1971 | ABC | distributor; produced by Daisy Productions; Currently distributed by Shout! Studios |
| The Doris Day Show | 1968–1973 | CBS | distributor; produced by Arwin Productions; Currently distributed by Paul Brownstein Productions |
| The Bugaloos | 1970–1972 | NBC | distributor; produced and currently owned by Sid and Marty Krofft Pictures |
| Lidsville | 1971–1973 | ABC | distributor; produced and currently owned by Sid and Marty Krofft Pictures |
| Let's Make a Deal | 1971–1977 | Syndication | |
| The Hilarious House of Frightenstein | 1971 | CHCH-TV | former distributor |
| The Wonderful Stories of Professor Kitzel | 1972–1973 | Syndication | distributor; produced by Krantz Films |
| It Pays to Be Ignorant | 1973-1974 | Syndication | distributor; produced by Stefan Hatos-Monty Hall Productions |
| Land of the Lost | 1974–1976 | NBC | distributor (continued from Viacom); produced and currently owned by Sid and Marty Krofft Pictures |
| Little House on the Prairie | 1974–1983 | NBC | distributor; produced by NBC Productions and Ed Friendly Productions; Currently distributed by NBCUniversal Syndication Studios (MGM Worldwide Television Distribution outside the U.S.) |
| The McLean Stevenson Show | 1976–1977 | NBC | distributor; produced by McLean Stevenson Enterprises, Inc. and Monty Hall Enterprises, Inc. |
| Hunter | 1977 | CBS | international distribution only; produced by Lorimar Productions |
| Eight Is Enough | 1977–1981 | ABC | international distribution only; produced by Lorimar Productions |
| Dallas | 1978–1991 | CBS | international distribution only; produced by Lorimar Productions |
| Sam | 1978 | CBS | with Mark VII Limited |
| Project U.F.O. | 1978–1979 | NBC | with Mark VII Limited |
| The Next Step Beyond | 1978–1979 | Syndication | produced by Factor-Newland Productions |
| Kaz | 1978–1979 | CBS | international distribution only; produced by Lorimar Productions |
| Highway to Heaven | 1984–1989 | NBC | distributor; produced by Michael Landon Productions; Currently distributed by Genesis International |
| Night Heat | 1985–1989 | CTV Television Network | distributor; produced by Alliance Communications and Grosso-Jacobson Productions; Currently owned by Lionsgate Television and SP Media Group |
| Starring the Actors | 1986 | Syndication | |
| Camp Candy | 1989–1992 | NBC/Syndication | distributor; produced by DIC Entertainment and Saban Entertainment; Currently owned by Disney–ABC Home Entertainment and Television Distribution |
| American Chronicles | 1990–1991 | FOX | distributor; produced by Lynch/Frost Productions |
| Pictionary | 1997–1998 | Syndication | with Kline & Friends and Pictionary Incorporated |

====== ABC Films (pre-1973) ======
| Title | Original run | Network | Notes |
|---|---|---|---|
| Annie Oakley | 1954–1957 | Syndication | produced by Flying A Productions; Currently owned by Gail Davis Enterprises |
| The Adventures of Champion | 1955–1956 | CBS | distributor; produced by Flying A Productions; In the public domain |
| Buffalo Bill, Jr. | 1955–1956 | Syndication | produced by Flying A Productions; In the public domain |
| Man with a Camera | 1958–1960 | ABC | produced by MWC Productions, Inc. |
| John Gunther's High Road | 1959–1960 | ABC | produced by Blue J Productions |
| Alcoa Presents: One Step Beyond | 1959–1961 | ABC | with Joseph L. Schenck Enterprises |
| The Rebel | 1959–1961 | ABC | produced by Celestial Productions, Fen-Ker-Ada Productions and Mark Goodson-Bill Todman Productions; Currently distributed by Shout! Studios |
| The New Breed | 1961–1962 | ABC | with Quinn Martin Productions and Selmur Productions |
| Ben Casey | 1961–1966 | ABC | produced by Bing Crosby Productions |
| Combat! | 1962–1967 | ABC | with Selmur Productions; North American distribution only |
| Discovery | 1962–1971 | ABC | |
| I'm Dickens, He's Fenster | 1962–1963 | ABC | produced by Heyday Productions |
| General Hospital | 1963–present | ABC | with Selmur Productions (1963–1967); distribution of pre-1973 episodes only Currently owned by Disney–ABC Home Entertainment and Television Distribution |
| Breaking Point | 1963–1964 | ABC | produced by Bing Crosby Productions |
| The New Casper Cartoon Show | 1963–1964 | ABC | produced by Famous Studios; Currently owned by DreamWorks Animation |
| The Fugitive | 1963–1967 | ABC | produced by Quinn Martin Productions and United Artists Television |
| The Hollywood Palace | 1964–1970 | ABC | |
| Wendy and Me | 1964–1965 | ABC | distribution only; produced by Natwill Productions and Warner Bros. Television |
| Mickey | 1964–1965 | ABC | with Selmur Productions; North American distribution only |
| Shindig! | 1964–1966 | ABC | with Selmur Productions; North American distribution only |
| Milton the Monster | 1965–1968 | ABC | with Hal Seeger Productions; Currently distributed by Foothill Entertainment |
| Branded | 1965–1966 | NBC | with Mark Goodson-Bill Todman Productions and Sentinel Productions; later distributed by King World Productions |
| The King Kong Show | 1966–1967 | ABC | produced by Videocraft International; Currently owned by DreamWorks Animation |
| Dark Shadows | 1966–1971 | ABC | Distributor; produced by Dan Curtis Productions |
| The Pruitts of Southampton/The Phyllis Diller Show | 1966–1967 | ABC | distribution only; produced by Filmways Television and PhilDil Productions; Currently owned by MGM Television |
| Cowboy in Africa | 1967–1968 | ABC | produced by Ivan Tors Films |
| Garrison's Gorillas | 1967–1968 | ABC | with Selmur Productions; North American distribution only |
| The Invaders | 1967–1968 | ABC | co-produced by Quinn Martin Productions |
| N.Y.P.D. | 1967–1969 | ABC | with Talent Associates |
| George of the Jungle | 1967 | ABC | produced by Jay Ward Productions |
| One Life to Live | 1968–2012 | ABC | distribution of pre-1973 episodes only Currently owned by Disney–ABC Home Entertainment and Television Distribution |
| Operation: Entertainment | 1968–1969 | ABC | produced by Chuck Barris Productions |
| The Mod Squad | 1968–1973 | ABC | produced by Thomas-Spelling Productions |
| The New People | 1969–1970 | ABC | |
| The Smokey Bear Show | 1969–1970 | ABC | produced by Rankin/Bass Animated Entertainment; Currently owned by DreamWorks Animation |
| Hot Wheels | 1969–1970 | ABC | produced by Pantomime Pictures Corporation and Ken Snyder Properties |
| Skyhawks | 1969–1970 | ABC | produced by Pantomime Pictures Corporation |
| Lancelot Link, Secret Chimp | 1970–1971 | ABC | co-produced by Sandler-Burns-Marmer Productions |
| The Most Deadly Game | 1970–1971 | ABC | |
| The Silent Force | 1970–1971 | ABC | |
| The Reluctant Dragon and Mr. Toad Show | 1970–1971 | ABC | produced by Rankin/Bass Productions; Currently owned by DreamWorks Animation |
| Will the Real Jerry Lewis Please Sit Down | 1970–1971 | ABC | produced by Filmation |
| The Smith Family | 1971–1973 | ABC | produced by Don Fedderson Productions |
| Curiosity Shop | 1971–1972 | ABC | |
| Jackson 5ive | 1971–1972 | ABC | produced by Rankin/Bass Productions, Halas and Batchelor, Motown Productions and Topcraft; Currently owned by DreamWorks Animation |

====== Taft Entertainment Television ======
| Title | Original run | Network | Notes |
|---|---|---|---|
| The Life and Times of Grizzly Adams | 1977–1978 | NBC | formerly distributed by Viacom; produced by Sunn Classic Pictures |
| Holocaust | 1978 | NBC | mini-series; produced by Titus Productions |
| Greatest Heroes of the Bible | 1978–1979 | NBC | formerly distributed by Viacom; produced by Sunn Classic Pictures |
| The Lucie Arnaz Show | 1985 | CBS | with Sam Denoff Productions |
| You Again? | 1986–1987 | NBC | with Sweater Productions |
| Throb | 1986–1988 | Syndication | with Swany, Inc. and Procter & Gamble Productions |
| Sable | 1987–1988 | ABC | with Sherman-Rosetti Productions |
| Starting from Scratch | 1988–1989 | Syndication | with Ohlmeyer Communications and Flying Unicorn Productions |
| Internal Affairs | 1988 | CBS | mini-series; produced by Titus Productions |
| Blackout | 1988 | CBS | with Jay Wolpert Productions |

====== Sunn Classic Pictures ======
| Title | Original run | Network | Notes |
|---|---|---|---|
| Laugh Trax | 1982–1983 | Syndication | |
| Dream West | 1986 | CBS | |

====== QM Productions ======
Formerly known as Quinn Martin Productions.

| Title | Original run | Network | Notes |
|---|---|---|---|
| The New Breed | 1961–1962 | ABC | with Selmur Productions; formerly distributed by ABC Films |
| The Fugitive | 1963–1967 | ABC | with United Artists Television |
| The Invaders | 1967–1968 | ABC | formerly distributed by ABC Films |
| Dan August | 1970–1971 | ABC | |
| Cannon | 1971–1976 | CBS | with CBS formerly distributed by Viacom |
| The Streets of San Francisco | 1972–1977 | ABC | with Warner Bros. Television (pilot and season 1 only) |
| Barnaby Jones | 1973–1980 | CBS | with Woodruff Productions (seasons 7–8) |
| The Manhunter | 1974–1975 | CBS | |
| Caribe | 1975 | ABC | |
| Bert D'Angelo/Superstar | 1976 | ABC | formerly distributed by Viacom |
| Most Wanted | 1976–1977 | ABC | |
| Quinn Martin's Tales of the Unexpected | 1977 | NBC | |
| The Runaways | 1978–1979 | NBC | with New Vistas Productions |
| A Man Called Sloane | 1979 | NBC | with Woodruff Productions |

===== Republic Pictures Television =====
| Title | Original run | Network | Notes |
|---|---|---|---|
| Stories of the Century | 1954–1955 | Syndication | |
| Frontier Doctor | 1958–1959 | Syndication | |
| Press Your Luck | 1985 | CBS | distribution only |
| Beauty and the Beast | 1987–1990 | CBS | Co-production with Ron Koslow Films and Witt/Thomas Productions |
| On Trial | 1988–1989 | Syndication | Co-production with Woody Fraser Productions and Reeves Entertainment Group |
| Son of the Morning Star | 1991 | ABC | miniseries; Co-production with Preston Stephen Fischer Company and The Mount Company |
| Love, Lies and Murder | 1991 | NBC | mini-series; Co-production with Two Shots Productions |

====== National Telefilm Associates ======
- China Smith (1952–1955) (Currently owned by Richard Duryea and Bernard Tabakin)
- Sheriff of Cochise/U.S. Marshall (1956–1958)
- How to Marry a Millionaire (1957–1959)
- Man Without a Gun (1957–1959)
- Official Detective (1957–1958)
- The Walter Winchell File (1957–1958)
- George Jessel's Show Business (1958)
- The Adventures of William Tell (1958–1959) (produced by ITC Entertainment)
- African Patrol (1958–1959)
- This is Alice (1958–1959)
- Mantovani (1959)
- Grand Jury (1959)
- The Third Man (1959–1965) (co-production with British Broadcasting Prestige Productions)
- Assignment: Underwater (1960–1962)
- Q. T. Hush (1960–1961)
- The Crime Reporter
- Search and Rescue (1977)

====== NBC Films (pre-1973) ======
| Title | Original run | Network | Notes |
|---|---|---|---|
| Fireside Theatre | 1949–1958 | NBC | with General Television Enterprises, Hal Roach Studios and Lewman Productions/Revue Studios |
| Cameo Theatre | 1950–1955 | NBC | |
| Big Town | 1950–1956 | CBS/NBC | |
| Dangerous Assignment | 1951-1952 | Syndication | |
| Victory at Sea | 1952–1953 | NBC | In the public domain |
| The Loretta Young Show | 1953–1961 | NBC | with Lewislor Films and Toreto Enterprises |
| Inner Sanctum | 1954–1955 | NBC | |
| People are Funny | 1954–1960 | NBC | |
| The Great Gildersleeve | 1955–1956 | NBC | |
| The Real McCoys | 1957–1963 | ABC/CBS | Produced by Brennan-Westgate and Marterto Productions; Currently distributed by SFM Entertainment |
| Continental Classroom | 1958–1963 | NBC | |
| Concentration | 1958–1973 | NBC | first two seasons produced by Barry, Enright & Friendly Productions |
| Fibber McGee and Molly | 1959–1960 | NBC | |
| Bonanza | 1959–1973 | NBC | |
| The Tab Hunter Show | 1960–1961 | NBC | with Shunto Productions |
| The Americans | 1961 | NBC | |
| Car 54, Where Are You? | 1961–1963 | NBC | with Eupolis Productions |
| The Funny Manns | 1961–1963 | NBC, Syndication | |
| Astro Boy | 1963–1965 | Syndication | English dub production; originally produced in Japan by Mushi Production; Currently licensed by Right Stuf Inc. |
| Temple Houston | 1963–1964 | NBC | with Warner Bros. Television and Apollo Productions |
| Kentucky Jones | 1963–1964 | NBC | |
| I Spy | 1965–1968 | NBC | Produced by Three F Productions; Currently distributed by the Peter Rodgers Organization |
| Get Smart | 1965–1970 | NBC/CBS | with Talent Associates and CBS Productions (season 5); HBO/Warner Bros. Television owns home entertainment and international distribution rights |
| Kimba the White Lion | 1965–1966 | NBC | English dub production; originally produced in Japan by Mushi Production; Currently licensed by Right Stuf Inc. |
| Animal Secrets | 1966–1967 | NBC | |
| T.H.E. Cat | 1966–1967 | NBC | |
| Captain Nice | 1967 | NBC | |
| Accidental Family | 1967–1968 | NBC | with Sheldon Leonard Productions |
| The Danny Thomas Hour | 1967–1968 | NBC | with Thomas-Spelling Productions |
| The Guns of Will Sonnett | 1967-1969 | ABC | distribution only; produced by Thomas-Spelling Productions, later distributed by King World Productions |
| The High Chaparral | 1967–1971 | NBC | with Xanadu Productions |
| My Friend Tony | 1969 | NBC | with Sheldon Leonard Productions |
| My World and Welcome to It | 1969–1970 | NBC | with Sheldon Leonard Productions |
| The Bill Cosby Show | 1969–1971 | NBC | with Jemmin Inc. Currently distributed by the Peter Rodgers Organization |
| Hot Dog | 1970–1971 | NBC | |
| Make Your Own Kind of Music | 1971 | NBC | with Tomka Productions |

====== California National Productions ======
| Title | Original run | Network | Notes |
|---|---|---|---|
| Frontier | 1955–1956 | NBC | |
| The Adventures of Hiram Holliday | 1956–1957 | NBC | In the public domain |
| Boots and Saddles | 1957–1958 | Syndication | |
| The Silent Service | 1957–1958 | Syndication | co-production with Twin Dolphin Productions, Inc. |
| Flight | 1958–1959 | Syndication | |
| Union Pacific | 1958–1959 | Syndication | |
| Philip Marlowe | 1959–1960 | ABC | co-production with Mark Goodson-Bill Todman Productions |
| Pony Express | 1959–1960 | Syndication | |
| The Lawless Years | 1959–1961 | NBC | co-production with Jack Chertok Television Productions |
| The Blue Angels | 1960–1961 | Syndication | |
| The Jim Backus Show | 1960–1961 | Syndication | |

==== Big Ticket Television ====
| Title | Original run | Network | Notes |
|---|---|---|---|
| Night Stand with Dick Dietrick | 1995–1997 | Syndication/E! | co-production with RC Entertainment |
| Moesha | 1996–2001 | UPN | co-production with Regan Jon Productions (1996–97), Saradipity Productions (1997–99) and Jump in the Sun Productions (1997–2000); Distributed by Worldvision Enterprises/Paramount Television |
| Judge Judy | 1996–2021 | Syndication | |
| Veronica's Video | 1997 | UPN | Unaired pilot |
| Judge Joe Brown | 1998–2013 | Syndication | |
| The Parkers | 1999–2004 | UPN | co-production with Saradipity Productions and Regan Jon Productions (season 1) |
| Gary & Mike | 2001 | UPN | co-production with Bahr-Small Productions and Laika |
| Danny | 2001 | CBS | co-production with Acme Productions and Johnny Bongos Productions |
| Wolf Lake | 2001–2002 | CBS/UPN | co-production with Cherry Pie Productions |
| Greetings from Tucson | 2002–2003 | The WB | co-produced with Bang and 3 Arts Entertainment |
| Hack | 2002–2004 | CBS | co-production with Pariah Films and CBS Productions |
| The Jamie Kennedy Experiment | 2002–2004 | The WB | co-production with Bahr-Small Productions, Karz Entertainment and Warner Bros. Television |
| Swift Justice | 2010–2012 | Syndication | co-production with Swift Justice Productions, Inc. and Georgia Entertainment Industries (2010–2011) |
| The Jeff Probst Show | 2012–2013 | Syndication | co-produced with Great Adventure Productions |
| Hot Bench | 2014–present | Syndication | co-produced with Queen Bee Productions |
| The Drew Barrymore Show | 2020–present | Syndication | co-produced with Flower Films |
| Adam's Law | 2026–present | Syndication | co-produced with Queen Bee Productions |

==== Raquel Productions ====
| Title | Years | Network | Notes |
|---|---|---|---|
| Shedding for the Wedding | 2011 | The CW | co-production with Warner Horizon Television, 25/7 Productions and Breakfast Anytime |
| Dogs in the City | 2012 | CBS | co-production with Shed Media US and Carol Mendelsohn Productions |
| The Next: Fame Is at Your Doorstep | 2012 | The CW | co-production with Warner Horizon Television, 25/7 Productions and Flavor Unit Entertainment |
| Oh Sit! | 2012–2013 | The CW | co-production with Warner Horizon Television, The Gurin Company and 405 Productions; distributed by Warner Bros. Television |
| Capture | 2013 | The CW | co-production with Warner Horizon Television and Renegade 83 Entertainment; distributed by Warner Bros. Television |
| Pink Collar Crimes | 2018 | CBS | |
| Tough as Nails | 2020–2023 | CBS | co-production with Tough House Productions |
| The Real Love Boat | 2022 | CBS/Paramount+ | co-production with Eureka Productions |
| Superfan | 2023 | CBS | co-production with Yacht Money Productions |
| America's Culinary Cup | 2026–present | CBS | co-production with Delicious Entertainment and Aha Studios |

=== CBS Broadcasting ===
==== CBS News and Stations ====
| Title | Years | Network | Notes |
|---|---|---|---|
| Community Auditions | 1953–1955; 1958–1987 | WBZ-TV | |
| Boomtown | 1956–1974 | WBZ | |
| The Froozles | 1970–1978 | KHJ-TV | |
| Ask the Manager | 1972–1999 | WSBK-TV | |
| The Scene | 1975–1987 | WGPR-TV | |
| Mid-Morning L.A. | 1978–1988 | KHJ | |
| The Changing Family | 1983–1988 | KHJ | |
| We Don't Knock | 1985–1986 | WSBK | |
| KidQuiz | 1985–1994 | KCBS-TV | |
| Rick Beamer; Bugs and the Beamer | 1987–1990 | KTVT | |
| Strictly Speaking | 1987–1992 | WGPR-TV | |
| Contempo | 1988–1990 | WGPR-TV | |
| Hersey's Hollywood | 1988–1992 | WSBK | |
| A.M. Boston | 1988–1989 | WSBK | |
| Beamer's Komedy Klub | 1988–1990 | KTVT | |
| Ranger Charlie and Roscoe | 1989–1991 | KSTW | |
| Good Day | 1995–present | KMAX-TV | |
| In Depth Detroit | 1997–2001 | WWJ-TV | |
| Evening Magazine; Eye on the Bay | 1998–2013 | KPIX-TV | |
| Good Evening Sacramento | 2001; 2003–2004 | KMAX-TV | |
| The Mark Cuban Show | 2001–2004 | KTXA | |

==== CBS Eye Productions ====
| Title | Original run | Network | Co-production with |
|---|---|---|---|
| Discovery Specials | 1998–2003 | Discovery Channel | CBS News and Discovery Channel |
| Discovery Health Specials | 1999–2005 | Discovery Health Channel | |
| Survivor | 2000–present | CBS | CBS Studios, Mark Burnett Productions (2000–2011), One Three Media (2012–2014), United Artists Media Group (2014–2015), MGM Television (2015–present), Castaway Television Productions and Survivor Productions LLC |
| Half & Half | 2002–2006 | UPN | SisterLee Productions |
| Platinum | 2003 | UPN | American Zoetrope, The Greenblatt/Janollari Studio and International Famous Players Radio Corporation |
| Food Network Star | 2005–2012 | Food Network | |
| Secret Lives of Women | 2005–2009 | WE tv | CBS News and Kaos Entertainment |
| Stunt Junkies | 2006–2007 | Discovery Channel | |
| Brink | 2008–2009 | Science Channel | CBS News |
| Deranged | 2009 | Investigation Discovery | Beanfield Productions |
| Foodography | 2010–2011 | Cooking Channel | |
| 24 Hour Restaurant Battle | 2010–2011 | Food Network | |
| The Injustice Files | 2011–2014 | Investigation Discovery | |
| My Grandmother's Ravioli | 2012–2015 | Cooking Channel | |
| HGTV Design Star All Stars | 2012 | HGTV | |
| HGTV Star | 2013 | HGTV | |
| Brother Vs. Brother | 2013 | HGTV | |
| The Arsenio Hall Show | 2013–2014 | Syndication | Arsenio Hall Communications, Octagon Entertainment Productions and Tribune Broadcasting |

=== Nickelodeon ===
| Title | Years | Network | Co-production with | Notes |
|---|---|---|---|---|
| Garfield and Friends | 1988–1994 | CBS | Film Roman, United Media Productions, Paws, Inc., Lee Mendelson Film Productions | copyright holder; currently distributed by 9 Story Media Group |
| Eureeka's Castle | 1989–1991 | Nickelodeon | Noyes & Laybourne | |
| Nick Jr. Rocks | 1991 | Nickelodeon | Interstitial series | |
| Gullah Gullah Island | 1994–1998 | Nickelodeon | Magnet Productions (season 1) and Perez-Minton Productions | |
| Allegra's Window | 1994–1996 | Nickelodeon | co-production with Topstone Productions and Jumbo Pictures | |
| KaBlam! | 1996–2000 | Nickelodeon | Flying Mallet, Inc. (season 4) | |
| Binyah Binyah! | 1997 | Nickelodeon | | |
| Renford Rejects | 1998–2001 | Nickelodeon; CBBC (United Kingdom) | Helion Pictures | |
| Oh Yeah! Cartoons | 1998–2001 | Nickelodeon | Frederator Incorporated | |
| Action League Now! | 2001–2002 | Nickelodeon | Chuckimation and Flying Mallet, Inc. | |
| Yakkity Yak | 2002–2003 | Nickelodeon; Teletoon (Canada) | Studio B Productions, Kapow Pictures, and Teletoon | |
| Teenage Mutant Ninja Turtles | 2003–2010 | Fox (FoxBox/4Kids TV); The CW (The CW4Kids) | Mirage Studios and 4Kids Entertainment | Acquired by Viacom in 2009 |
| Whoopi's Littleburg | 2004 | Nickelodeon | Lil' Whoop Productions and Shot in the Dark Productions | |
| Fatherhood | 2004–2005 | Nick at Nite | | |
| Curious Buddies | 2004–2005 | Direct-to-video | Spiffy Pictures | |
| Family Face Off: Hollywood | 2004 | Nick at Nite | | |
| Nicktoons Film Festival | 2004–2009 | Nicktoons | Frederator Studios | |
| Purple and Brown | 2005–2008 | Nickelodeon | Aardman Animations | Interstitial series |
| At the Poocharelli's | 2006 | Nick at Nite | | |
| Random! Cartoons | 2006–2007 | Nicktoons Network | Frederator Incorporated | |
| Shorts in a Bunch | 2007 | Nicktoons | | |
| Bet the House | 2007–2008 | Nick at Nite | | interstitial series |
| The Assistants | 2009 | The N | Tom Lynch Company Studios (copyright holder) for Fireworks Entertainment | Distributed outside of the U.S. by Quiver Distribution |
| Glenn Martin, DDS | 2009–2011 | Nick at Nite | The Tornante Company and Cuppa Coffee Studios | |
| The Fresh Beat Band | 2009–2013 | Nickelodeon | | |
| Paw Patrol | 2013–present | Nickelodeon; TVOKids | Spin Master Entertainment | distributor |
| Mutt & Stuff | 2015–2017 | Sid and Marty Krofft Pictures and Cesar's Way | | |
| Top Wing | 2017–2020 | Nickelodeon/Nick Jr. Channel; Treehouse TV | Industrial Brothers and 9 Story Media Group | |
| Zoofari | 2018 | Nickelodeon/Nick Jr. Channel | | |
| Tot Cop | 2019 | Nick Jr. (UK and Ireland); Noggin app | | |
| Tyler Perry's Young Dylan | 2020–2025 | Nickelodeon | Tyler Perry Studios | distributor |
| Sharkdog | 2021–2023 | Netflix | One Animation | |
| Rubble & Crew | 2023–present | Nickelodeon; Treehouse TV | Spin Master Entertainment | distributor |

=== Comedy Partners ===
| Title | Years | Network | Notes |
|---|---|---|---|
| Mystery Science Theater 3000 | 1989–1996 | The Comedy Channel; Comedy Central | co-production with Best Brains and HBO Downtown Productions; Rights owned by Shout! Studios |
| Random Acts of Variety | 1990–1994 | HA! Comedy Central | |
| Afterdrive | 1990–1991 | HA! Comedy Central | |
| Access America | 1990–1991 | HA! Comedy Central | co-production with Reeves Entertainment |
| Comics Only | 1990–1992 | HA! Comedy Central | co-production with I'm Right No I'm Right Productions |
| Women Aloud | 1992–1993 | Comedy Central | co-production with HBO Downtown Productions |
| Two Drink Minimum | 1993–1994 | Comedy Central | co-production with HBO Downtown Productions |
| Politically Incorrect | 1993–2002 | Comedy Central | co-production with HBO Downtown Productions |
| Dr. Katz, Professional Therapist | 1995–2002 | Comedy Central | co-production with HBO Downtown Productions, Popular Arts Entertainment and Soup2Nuts |
| The Daily Show | 1996–present | Comedy Central | co-production with MTV Entertainment Studios, Mad Cow Productions, Busboy Productions and Ark Angel |
| Pulp Comics | 1996–2000 | Comedy Central | |
| Canned Ham | 1996–2002 | Comedy Central | |
| Lounge Lizards | 1996–1997 | Comedy Central | |
| Viva Variety | 1997–1999 | Comedy Central | |
| Make Me Laugh | 1997–1998 | Comedy Central | co-production with Dove Four Point Productions |
| South Park | 1997–present | Comedy Central | co-production with MTV Entertainment Studios (seasons 25–27), Paramount Television Studios (season 28–) and South Park Studios |
| Premium Blend | 1997–2005 | Comedy Central | |
| Upright Citizens Brigade | 1998–2000 | Comedy Central | |
| Comedy Central Presents | 1998–2011 | Comedy Central | co-production with Rick Mill Productions |
| The Man Show | 1999–2004 | Comedy Central | co-production with Stone Stanley Entertainment; Rights owned by Stone & Company Entertainment |
| Strangers with Candy | 1999–2000 | Comedy Central | |
| Turn Ben Stein On | 1999–2001 | Comedy Central | |
| Vs. | 1999 | Comedy Central | co-production with First Television |
| BattleBots | 2000–2002 | Comedy Central | later aired on the ABC and Discovery Channel; co-production with Whalerock Industries and BattleBots Productions |
| Strip Mall | 2000–2001 | Comedy Central | |
| TV Funhouse | 2000–2001 | Comedy Central | co-production with Poochie Doochie Productions |
| The Chris Wylde Show Starring Chris Wylde | 2001 | Comedy Central | |
| Insomniac with Dave Attell | 2001–2004 | Comedy Central | |
| Let's Bowl | 2001–2002 | Comedy Central | co-production with The Scott–Kronfeld Experience |
| Primetime Glick | 2001–2003 | Comedy Central | |
| That's My Bush! | 2001 | Comedy Central | co-production with Important Television |
| Comic Groove | 2002 | Comedy Central | |
| Contest Searchlight | 2002 | Comedy Central | co-production with Apostle |
| Crank Yankers | 2002–2007; 2019–2022 | Comedy Central/MTV2 | co-production with MTV Entertainment Studios, ITV America and Kimmelot |
| Tough Crowd with Colin Quinn | 2002–2004 | Comedy Central | |
| Gerhard Reinke's Wanderlust | 2003 | Comedy Central | co-production with Jackhole Productions |
| Chappelle's Show | 2003–2006 | Comedy Central | co-production with Pilot Boys Productions and Marobru Productions |
| Comedy Central Roast | 2003–2019 | Comedy Central | |
| I'm with Busey | 2003 | Comedy Central | |
| Reno 911! | 2003–2009; 2020–2022 | Comedy Central; Quibi/The Roku Channel | co-production with MTV Entertainment Studios, Jersey Television (2003–2009) and High Sierra Carpeting |
| Kid Notorious | 2003 | Comedy Central | co-production with Alan & Alan Productions, Brett Morgen Productions and Woodland Productions |
| Crossballs | 2004 | Comedy Central | |
| Jump Cuts | 2004 | Comedy Central | |
| Shorties Watchin' Shorties | 2004 | Comedy Central | |
| Wanda Does It | 2004 | Comedy Central | |
| The World Stands Up | 2004 | Comedy Central | |
| Drawn Together | 2004–2007 | Comedy Central | co-production with Double Hemm |
| Con | 2005 | Comedy Central | |
| The Hollow Men | 2005 | Comedy Central | |
| Stella | 2005 | Comedy Central | |
| Too Late with Adam Carolla | 2005 | Comedy Central | |
| Weekends at the D.L. | 2005 | Comedy Central | |
| The Showbiz Show with David Spade | 2005–2007 | Comedy Central | |
| Mind of Mencia | 2005–2008 | Comedy Central | |
| The Colbert Report | 2005–2014 | Comedy Central | co-production with Spartina Productions and Busboy Productions |
| Dog Bites Man | 2006 | Comedy Central | co-production with DreamWorks Television |
| Live at Gotham | 2006–2009 | Comedy Central | |
| American Body Shop | 2007 | Comedy Central | |
| Halfway Home | 2007 | Comedy Central | |
| Lil' Bush | 2007–2008 | Comedy Central | |
| The Sarah Silverman Program | 2007–2010 | Comedy Central | co-production with Eleven Eleven O' Clock Productions and Oil Factory, Inc. |
| Chocolate News | 2008 | Comedy Central | |
| Lewis Black's Root of All Evil | 2008 | Comedy Central | |
| Reality Bites Back | 2008 | Comedy Central | |
| Atom TV | 2008–2010 | Comedy Central | |
| The Jeff Dunham Show | 2009 | Comedy Central | |
| Kröd Mändoon and the Flaming Sword of Fire | 2009 | Comedy Central | |
| Michael & Michael Have Issues | 2009 | Comedy Central | |
| Important Things with Demetri Martin | 2009–2010 | Comedy Central | co-production with Busboy Productions and PersonGlobal |
| Secret Girlfriend | 2009 | Comedy Central | co-production with Fremantle |
| Tosh.0 | 2009–2020 | Comedy Central | co-production with Black Heart Productions |
| Russell Simmons Presents: Stand-Up at the El Rey | 2010 | Comedy Central | |
| Nick Swardson's Pretend Time | 2010–2011 | Comedy Central | co-production with Culver Entertainment, Happy Madison Productions, and Sony Pictures Television |
| Ugly Americans | 2010–2012 | Comedy Central | co-production with F**k Factor Productions, Irony Point, Augenblick Studios, Turner Studios, Solis/Markle Animation Productions, Cuppa Coffee Studios (season 1), Big Jump Entertainment (season 2) and Tookie Wilson Productions |
| John Oliver's New York Stand-Up Show | 2010–2013 | Comedy Central | |
| Jon Benjamin Has a Van | 2011 | Comedy Central | |
| Onion SportsDome | 2011 | Comedy Central | |
| Russell Simmons Presents: The Ruckus | 2011 | Comedy Central | |
| Sports Show with Norm Macdonald | 2011 | Comedy Central | |
| Workaholics | 2011–2017 | Comedy Central | co-production with Avalon Television, Mail Order Comedy, 4th Year Productions (2011–2014) and Gigapix Studios (2011–2013) |
| Mash Up | 2012 | Comedy Central | |
| Amy Schumer: Mostly Sex Stuff | 2012 | Comedy Central | |
| The Burn with Jeff Ross | 2012–2013 | Comedy Central | |
| Brickleberry | 2012–2015 | Comedy Central | co-production with Fox 21 Television Studios, Bento Box Entertainment, Damn! Show Productions and Black Heart Productions |
| Key & Peele | 2012–2015 | Comedy Central | co-production with Cindylou, Monkeypaw Productions, Martel & Roberts Productions and Principato-Young Entertainment |
| Kroll Show | 2013–2015 | Comedy Central | co-production with Good at Bizness, Inc |
| The Jeselnik Offensive | 2013 | Comedy Central | co-production with Mosaic Media Group |
| The Ben Show | 2013 | Comedy Central | co-production with Levity Productions |
| Nathan for You | 2013–2017 | Comedy Central | co-production with Abso Lutely Productions, Blow Out Productions and W•D•M |
| Brody Stevens: Enjoy It! | 2013–2014 | Comedy Central | |
| Adam Devine's House Party | 2013–2016 | Comedy Central | co-production with Dennis and Penny's Son, Inc., Wonk Inc. and Avalon Television |
| Inside Amy Schumer | 2013–2016; 2022 | Comedy Central; Paramount+ | It's So Easy Productions, Irony Point and Jax Media |
| @midnight | 2013–2017 | Comedy Central | co-production with Funny or Die, Garant Lennon Productions, Nerdist Industries, Serious Business and Brillstein Entertainment Partners |
| Drunk History | 2013–2019 | Comedy Central | co-production with Konner Productions, Gary Sanchez Productions and Funny or Die |
| Comedy Underground with Dave Attell | 2014 | Comedy Central | |
| The Meltdown with Jonah and Kumail | 2014–2016 | Comedy Central | co-production with Red Hour Productions, Literally Figurative and Johnny Videogames |
| TripTank | 2014–2016 | Comedy Central | co-production with ShadowMachine |
| Review | 2014–2017 | Comedy Central | co-production with Abso Lutely Productions |
| Broad City | 2014–2019 | Comedy Central | co-production with Paper Kite Productions, 3 Arts Entertainment and Jax Media |
| Idiotsitter | 2014–2019 | CC: Studios/Comedy Central | co-production with 3 Arts Entertainment |
| This Is Not Happening | 2015–2019 | Comedy Central | |
| Big Time in Hollywood, FL | 2015 | Comedy Central | co-production with Red Hour Productions and Brillstein Entertainment Partners |
| Another Period | 2015–2018 | Comedy Central | co-production with Red Hour Productions, Leggero/Lindhome Productions and Konner Productions |
| Why? with Hannibal Buress | 2015 | Comedy Central | co-production with 3 Arts Entertainment |
| Moonbeam City | 2015 | Comedy Central | co-production with Titmouse, Inc., Oilver Bridge Entertainment, Solis Animation and Alphapnel Industries |
| Not Safe with Nikki Glaser | 2016 | Comedy Central | co-production with Perfect, Convy Entertainment, Guinea Pig Productions and Brillstein Entertainment Partners |
| Legends of Chamberlain Heights | 2016–2017 | Comedy Central | co-production with Bento Box Entertainment, Running With Scissors and TrueStarr Society of Ninjas Incorporated |
| The Comedy Jam | 2017 | Comedy Central | |
| The High Court with Doug Benson | 2017 | Comedy Central | co-production with Jash and Propagate Content |
| Jeff & Some Aliens | 2017 | Comedy Central | co-production with ShadowMachine |
| Detroiters | 2017–2018 | Comedy Central | |
| Hood Adjacent with James Davis | 2017 | Comedy Central | |
| The Jim Jefferies Show | 2017–2019 | Comedy Central | |
| The Opposition with Jordan Klepper | 2017 | Comedy Central | co-production with Ark Angel |
| The President Show | 2017 | Comedy Central | co-production with 3 Arts Entertainment, Clone Wolf Productions and Pie Baby Productions |
| Corporate | 2018–2020 | Comedy Central | co-production with Incredible Success! |
| This Week at the Comedy Cellar | 2018–2020 | Comedy Central | |
| The Other Two | 2019–2023 | Comedy Central/HBO Max | co-production with MTV Entertainment Studios, Broadway Video, Jax Media and Kelly/Schneider |
| Alternatino with Arturo Castro | 2019 | Comedy Central | co-production with Avalon Television |
| South Side | 2019–2022 | Comedy Central/HBO Max | co-production with MTV Entertainment Studios, Emerald Street, The Riddle Entertainment Group and Jax Media |
| Awkwafina Is Nora from Queens | 2020–2023 | Comedy Central | co-production with MTV Entertainment Studios, In Fina We Trust and Artists First |
| Robbie | 2020 | Comedy Central | co-production with Gary Sanchez Productions |
| Doing The Most with Phoebe Robinson | 2021 | Comedy Central | co-production with MTV Entertainment Studios, Embassy Row and Tiny Reparations |
| Hell of a Week with Charlamagne tha God | 2021–2022 | Comedy Central | co-production with MTV Entertainment Studios, CThaGodWorld Productions and Spartina Productions |

=== Paramount Network (Spike Cable Networks Inc.) ===
| Title | Years | Network | Notes |
|---|---|---|---|
| Gary the Rat | 2003 | Spike | co-production with Grammnet Productions and Cheyenne Enterprises |
| Ren & Stimpy "Adult Party Cartoon" | 2003 | Spike | |
| Stripperella | 2003–2004 | Spike | co-production with The Firm |
| The Joe Schmo Show | 2003–2013; 2025 | Spike (seasons 1-3); TBS (season 4) | co-production with Reese Wernick Productions, Stone Stanley Entertainment (seasons 1–2), Zoo Productions (season 3), Fly on the Wall Entertainment (season 4) and MTV Entertainment Studios (season 4) |
| Spike TV's 52 Favorite Cars | 2004 | Spike | |
| This Just In! | 2004 | Spike | |
| GameTrailers TV with Geoff Keighley | 2005–2013 | Spike | |
| Pros vs. Joes | 2006–2010 | Spike | |
| Murder | 2007 | Spike | co-production with Bunim/Murray Productions |
| DEA | 2008–2009 | Spike | |
| 1000 Ways to Die | 2008–2012 | Spike | co-production with Original Productions |
| Factory | 2008 | Spike | co-production with Screamin' Chicken Productions, 3 Arts Entertainment and Devlin Entertainment |
| 4th and Long | 2009 | Spike | |
| Jesse James Is a Dead Man | 2009 | Spike | |
| Surviving Disaster | 2009 | Spike | |
| Deadliest Warrior | 2009–2011 | Spike | |
| Permanent Mark | 2010 | Spike | |
| Scrappers | 2010 | Spike | co-production with Hoopsick Falls Productions |
| Auction Hunters | 2010–2015 | Spike | co-production with Gurney Productions |
| Coal | 2011 | Spike | co-production with Original Productions |
| Phowned! | 2011 | Spike | |
| Flip Men | 2011–2012 | Spike | co-production with 25/7 Productions |
| Repo Games | 2011–2012 | Spike | |
| Bar Rescue | 2011–present | Spike/Paramount Network | co-production with MTV Entertainment Studios (season 8–9), Paramount Television Studios (season 10–present) and 3 Ball Entertainment |
| Big Easy Justice | 2012 | Spike | |
| Diamond Divers | 2012 | Spike | |
| Rat Bastards | 2012 | Spike | |
| Undercover Stings | 2012 | Spike | co-production with Langley Productions |
| American Digger/Savage Family Diggers | 2012–2013 | Spike | co-production with Gurney Productions |
| World's Worst Tenants | 2012–2013 | Spike | Zoo Productions |
| Tattoo Nightmares | 2012–2015 | Spike | |
| Ink Master | 2012–2024 | Spike/Paramount Network | co-production with Truly Original |
| Car Lot Rescue | 2013 | Spike | |
| Criss Angel BeLIEve | 2013 | Spike | |
| Tattoo Rescue | 2013 | Spike | |
| Urban Tarzan | 2013 | Spike | |
| Cops (season 26–32) | 2013–2020 | Spike/Paramount Network | co-production with Langley Productions |
| 10 Million Dollar Bigfoot Bounty | 2014 | Spike | co-production with Original Media |
| Frankenfood | 2014 | Spike | |
| Gym Rescue | 2014 | Spike | |
| Hungry Investors | 2014 | Spike | |
| Tattoo Nightmares: Miami | 2014 | Spike | |
| Catch a Contractor | 2014–2015 | Spike | |
| Coaching Bad | 2015 | Spike | |
| Framework | 2015 | Spike | |
| Sweat Inc. | 2015 | Spike | |
| Lip Sync Battle | 2015–2019 | Spike/Paramount Network | co-production with Matador Content, Eight Million Plus Productions, Sunday Night Productions, Four Eyes Entertainment and Carey Patterson Entertainment |
| Waco | 2018 | Paramount Network | co-production with The Weinstein Company (uncredited) and Brothers Dowdle Productions |
| It Was Him: The Many Murders of Ed Edwards | 2018 | Paramount Network | co-production with All3Media America, Main Event Media and Turn Left Productions |
| Yellowstone | 2018–2024 | Paramount Network | co-production with Linson Entertainment, Bosque Ranch Productions, Treehouse Films, 101 Studios (since season 2), MTV Entertainment Studios (since season 4) |
| Heathers | 2018 | Paramount Network | co-production with Gyre & Gimble Productions, Underground Films and Lakeshore Entertainment; Based on the 1989 movie by New World Pictures; Previously ordered at Fox |
| The Last Cowboy | 2019–present | Paramount Network/CMT | co-production with MTV Entertainment Studios (seasons 2–5), Paramount Television Studios (season 6–), Truly Original, Bosque Ranch Productions and 101 Studios |
| Battle of the Fittest Couples | 2019 | Paramount Network | co-production with 51 Minds Entertainment |
| Coyote | 2021 | CBS All Access | co-production with Sony Pictures Television Studios, Dark Horse Entertainment; Previously ordered at Paramount Network |

=== Country Music Television ===
| Title | Years | Network | Co-production with |
|---|---|---|---|
| CMT Crossroads | 2002–present | CMT | MTV Entertainment Studios |
| Cowboy U | 2003–2007 | CMT | |
| CMT Insider | 2004–2012 | CMT | |
| Trick My Truck | 2005–2009 | CMT | Varuna Entertainment |
| Country Fried Home Videos | 2006–2009 | CMT | |
| Dallas Cowboys Cheerleaders: Making the Team | 2006–2021 | CMT | MTV Entertainment Studios and Triage Entertainment |
| CMT Comedy Stage | 2007 | CMT | |
| My Big Redneck Wedding | 2008–2011 | CMT | |
| Can You Duet | 2008–2009 | CMT | |
| The World's Strictest Parents | 2009–2010 | CMT | |
| CMT Artists of the Year | 2010–2022 | CMT | Switched On Entertainment and MTV Entertainment Studios |
| Working Class | 2011 | CMT | |
| Redneck Island | 2012–2016 | CMT | 51 Minds Entertainment |
| Chainsaw Gang | 2012–2016 | CMT | |
| CMT Hot Twenty | 2013–present | CMT | MTV Entertainment Studios |
| Dog and Beth: On the Hunt | 2013–2015 | CMT | Electus and Entertainment by Bonnie & Clyde |
| Guntucky | 2013–2014 | CMT | Leftfield Pictures |
| Bounty Hunters | 2013 | CMT | Muse Entertainment and Parallel Entertainment |
| Party Down South | 2014–2016 | CMT | 495 Productions |
| Steve Austin's Broken Skull Challenge | 2014–2017 | CMT | Broken Skull Productions and 51 Minds Entertainment |
| The Josh Wolf Show | 2015 | CMT | |
| I Love Kellie Pickler | 2015–2017 | CMT | Ryan Seacrest Productions and 51 Minds Entertainment |
| Sun Records | 2017 | CMT | |
| Music City | 2018–2019 | CMT | |
| Racing Wives | 2019 | CMT | T Group Productions |
| CMT Campfire Sessions | 2021–2024 | CMT | |

=== BET Networks ===
| Title | Years | Network | Notes |
|---|---|---|---|
| Soul Train | 1971–2006 | Syndication | produced by Don Cornelius Productions; Acquired by BET Networks in 2016 |
| Bobby Jones Gospel | 1980–2016 | BET | |
| Video Soul | 1981–1996 | BET | |
| Karen's Kitchen | 1982 | BET | |
| Video Vibrations | 1984–1997 | BET | |
| Midnight Love | 1985–2005 | BET | |
| Video LP | 1986–1993 | BET | |
| Softnotes | 1987–1991 | BET | |
| Rap City | 1989–2008 | BET | |
| Video Gospel | 1989, 2000–2005, 2010–2011 | BET | |
| Teen Summit | 1989–2002 | BET | |
| Screen Scene | 1990–1997 | BET | |
| Story Porch | 1992–1996 | BET | |
| ComicView | 1992–2008; 2014 | BET | |
| Planet Groove | 1996–1999 | BET | |
| ABL on BET | 1996–1998 | BET | |
| Jam Zone/Cita's World | 1997–2003 | BET | |
| Videolink | 1997–2000, 2001–2002 | BET | |
| BET's MAAD Sports | 1998–2000 | BET | |
| Hits from the Streets | 1999–2003 | BET | |
| Lift Every Voice | 1999–2017 | BET | |
| AM @ BET | 2000–2001 | BET | |
| 106 & Park | 2000–2014 | BET | |
| BET Next | 2000–2006 | BET | |
| BET:iNY | 2000–2002 | BET | |
| Access Granted | 2001–2010 | BET | |
| BET Uncut | 2001–2006 | BET | |
| BET.COM Countdown | 2001–2006 | BET | |
| BET's Top 25 | 2001–2008 | BET | |
| BET Nightly News | 2001–2005 | BET | CBS News |
| BET Start | 2002–2005; 2014 | BET | |
| 106 & Park Prime | 2003–2004 | BET | |
| BET Music | 2003–2008 | BET | |
| BET Now | 2003–2008 | BET | |
| Hey Monie! | 2003 | BET | co-produced by Soup2Nuts |
| The Center | 2003–2007 | BET | |
| BET After Dark | 2004–2007 | BET | |
| College Hill | 2004–2009 | BET | co-production with Edmonds Entertainment |
| BET Style | 2004–2006 | BET | |
| Top 50 | 2005–2006 | BET | |
| Remixed! | 2005–2006 | BET | |
| Rip the Runway | 2005–2013 | BET | |
| Top 20 Countdown | 2005–2013 | BET | |
| Hotwyred | 2006–2007 | BET | |
| Keyshia Cole: The Way It Is | 2006–2008 | BET | |
| The Black Carpet | 2006–2008 | BET | |
| The Game | 2006–2015 | The CW/BET | co-production with CBS Studios, Grammnet Productions, Happy Camper Productions (seasons 1–2), and Akil Productions (seasons 3–9) |
| BET Hip Hop Awards | 2006–present | BET | |
| American Gangster | 2006–2009 | BET | co-production with A. Smith & Co. Productions, Urban Romances and Asylum Entertainment |
| Baldwin Hills | 2007–2009 | BET | co-production with C4 Pictures |
| Sunday Best | 2007–2015; 2019–2020 | BET | |
| The 5ive | 2007 | BET | |
| Hell Date | 2007–2008 | BET | |
| Iron Ring | 2008 | BET | co-production with Zilo Live, Inc. |
| The BET Honors | 2008 | BET | |
| Brothers to Brutha | 2008 | BET | |
| Iron Ring | 2008 | BET | |
| The Deal | 2008–2010 | BET | |
| Frankie & Neffe | 2009 | BET | |
| Harlem Heights | 2009 | BET | |
| 106 & Gospel | 2009 | BET | |
| My Black is Beautiful | 2009–2010 | BET | co-production with Evolution Media and LiquidThread |
| Tiny and Toya | 2009–2010 | BET | co-production with DuBose Entertainment |
| The Family Crews | 2010–2011 | BET | co-production with Strange Fruit Media |
| Black Girls Rock! | 2010 | BET | |
| The Michael Vick Project | 2010 | BET | |
| Trey Songz: My Moment | 2010 | BET | |
| Black Panther | 2011 | BET | co-produced with Marvel Knights Animation, Hudlin Entertainment and Titmouse, Inc. |
| Reed Between the Lines | 2011 | BET | co-produced by Georgia Entertainment Industries |
| Let's Stay Together | 2011–2014 | BET | co-production with Cofa Entertainment Group and Flavor Unit Entertainment |
| Don't Sleep! | 2012 | BET | |
| Keyshia & Daniel: Family First | 2012 | BET | co-production with DuBose Entertainment |
| Second Generation Wayans | 2013 | BET | co-production with Running with Scissors, Baby Way Productions and Second Generation |
| Real Husbands of Hollywood | 2013–2016 | BET | co-production with HartBeat Productions, JSR Productions, and 3 Arts Entertainment |
| Being Mary Jane | 2013–2019 | BET | co-produced with Akil Productions, Breakdown Productions, Schoolcraft Productions (season 4–5) and Will Packer Productions (season 4–5) |
| Just Keke | 2014 | BET | co-produced by Mathis Productions and Telepictures |
| Nellyville | 2014–2015 | BET | co-production with Entertainment One and Derrty Ent. |
| DeSean Jackson: Home Team | 2015 | BET | |
| Keyshia Cole: All In | 2015 | BET | co-production with DuBose Entertainment and Keyshia Cole Productions |
| It's A Mann's World | 2015–2016 | BET | co-production with Entertainment One |
| The BET Life Of... | 2015–present | BET | |
| About The Business | 2016 | BET | |
| Criminals at Work | 2016 | BET | |
| Chasing Destiny | 2016 | BET | |
| Ink, Paper, Scissors | 2016 | BET | |
| Zoe Ever After | 2016 | BET | co-production with Scooter Braun Projects and Martin Chase Productions |
| Joyful Noise | 2016–2017 | BET | |
| From the Bottom Up | 2016 | BET Her | |
| The Comedy Get Down | 2017 | BET | co-production with 3 Arts Entertainment and Free90 Media |
| The Quad | 2017–2018 | BET | co-production with Rainforest Entertainment, WaterWalk Productions, and Capital Arts Entertainment |
| Rebel | 2017 | BET | co-production with New Deal Productions, 8 Mile Scomi Productions, MarVista Entertainment and Silver Screen Pictures Entertainment |
| 50 Central | 2017 | BET | co-production with G-Unit Films and Television Inc. and Black Roads Entertainment |
| Tales | 2017–2022 | BET | co-production with Visionary Ideas |
| The Comedy Get Down | 2017 | BET | co-production 3 Arts Entertainment and Free 90 Media |
| Face Value | 2017 | BET | |
| The Rundown with Robin Thede | 2017–2018 | BET | co-production with For Better or Words Inc. Enterprises Inc. and Jax Media |
| Black Card Revoked | 2018 | BET | co-production with Alternative Productions and Bill's Market & Television Productions |
| Mancave | 2018 | BET | co-production with Truly Original |
| The Family Business | 2018–present | BET/BET+ | produced by Tri Destinated Studios and Urban Books Media |
| In Contempt | 2018 | BET | co-produced by Blue Ice Pictures |
| The Grand Hustle | 2018 | BET | |
| Hustle in Brooklyn | 2018 | BET | |
| American Soul | 2019–2020 | BET | produced by Once A Frog Entertainment, Inphiniti Entertainment, Philoment Media and Jesse Collins Entertainment |
| Boomerang | 2019–2020 | BET | co-production with 606 Television, DeEtte Productions, Hillman Grad Productions, and Paramount Television Studios |
| Games People Play | 2019–2021 | BET | co-production with Edmonds Entertainment and STX Entertainment |
| The Oval | 2019–2026 | BET | distribution; produced by Tyler Perry Studios |
| Sistas | 2019–present | BET | distribution; produced by Tyler Perry Studios |
| American Gangster: Trap Queens | 2019–2022 | BET+ | co-production with A. Smith & Company Productions |
| Bigger | 2019–2021 | BET+ | co-production with Will Packer Productions, Running With Scissors, Inc., and Capital Arts Entertainment |
| Twenties | 2020–2021 | BET | |
| Boiling Point | 2021 | BET | co-production with CBS News |
| Disrupt & Dismantle | 2021 | BET | co-production with Soledad O'Brien Productions |
| BET Presents: The Encore | 2021 | BET | co-production with Kingdom Reign Entertainment |
| The Ms. Pat Show | 2021–present | BET+ | co-production with Imagine Television, Lee Daniels Entertainment and DAELight Media |
| Klutch Academy | 2021 | BET | co-production with Klutch Sports Group, Khalabo Ink Society and Tollin Productions |
| Kingdom Business | 2022–2023 | BET+ | co-production with Franklin Entertainment, Relevé Entertainment, Fo Yo Soul Entertainment, Inspired Entertainment, and DAELight Media |
| I Love Us | 2022 | BET+ | co-production with Push It Productions |
| College Hill: Celebrity Edition | 2022–2024 | BET+ | co-production with Edmonds Entertainment and This Way Out Media |
| The Murder Inc Story | 2022 | BET | co-production with Visionary Ideas |
| The Impact: Atlanta | 2022–2024 | BET+ | co-production with Entertainment One and Quality Films |
| After Happily Ever After | 2022 | BET | co-production with Bunim/Murray Productions |
| America in Black | 2023–2024 | BET | co-production with CBS News |
| The Wine Down with Mary J. Blige | 2023 | BET | co-production with Blue Butterfly Productions, Davis Entertainment and Lisa Erspamer Entertainment |
| Average Joe | 2023–present | BET+ | co-production with DAE Light Media and Wonderland Sound and Vision |
| Ms. Pat Settles It | 2023–present | BET | co-production with 495 Productions |
| BET Her Live | 2023 | BET Her | |

=== CBS Media Ventures ===
Formerly known as CBS Television Distribution.

| Title | Original run | Network | Notes |
|---|---|---|---|
| Entertainment Tonight | 1981–present | Syndication | previously produced by Paramount Domestic Television |
| Wheel of Fortune | 1983–present | Syndication | previously distributed by KingWorld; produced by Sony Pictures Television; CBS surrendered the distribution rights to Sony in 2025 |
| Jeopardy! | 1984–present | Syndication | previously distributed by KingWorld; produced by Sony Pictures Television; CBS surrendered the distribution rights to Sony in 2025 |
| The Oprah Winfrey Show | 1986–2011 | Syndication | produced by Harpo Productions (owner) previously distributed by KingWorld |
| Inside Edition | 1988–present | Syndication | previously distributed by KingWorld |
| The Montel Williams Show | 1991–2008 | Syndication | previously distributed by Viacom and Paramount Domestic Television; produced by Mountain Movers Productions |
| Judge Judy | 1996–2021 | Syndication | previously distributed by Worldvision Enterprises and Paramount Domestic Television; produced by Big Ticket Television |
| Judge Joe Brown | 1998–2013 | Syndication | previously distributed by Worldvision Enterprises and Paramount Domestic Television; produced by Big Ticket Television |
| Dr. Phil | 2002–2023 | Syndication | previously distributed by KingWorld and Paramount Domestic Television; produced by Peteski Productions and Stage 29 Productions (2010–2023) |
| The Insider | 2004–2017 | Syndication | previously produced by Paramount Domestic Television; known as omg! Insider from January 2013 to January 2014 |
| The Doctors | 2008–2022 | Syndication | produced by Stage 29 Productions |
| Smash Cuts | 2009–2011 | Syndication | |
| The Test | 2013–2014 | Syndication | produced by Stage 29 Productions |
| Hot Bench | 2014–present | Syndication | produced by Queen Bee Productions and Big Ticket Television |
| Daily Mail TV | 2017–2022 | Syndication | produced by Stage 29 Productions |
| Face the Truth | 2018–2019 | Syndication | produced by Keller/Noll and Stage 29 Productions |
| The Drew Barrymore Show | 2020–present | Syndication | produced by Flower Films and Big Ticket Television |
| Women of Wrestling | 2022–present | Syndication | |
| Pictionary | 2022–2025 | Syndication | copyright holder; co-production with Fox First Run, Bill's Market and Television Production, and Mattel Television |
| Flip Side | 2024–present | Syndication/Game Show Network | copyright holder; co-production with Keller/Noll, Courtside Creative and Game Show Enterprises Studios |
| The Perfect Line | 2025–present | Syndication/Game Show Network | copyright holder; co-production with Inkslar Productions (season 1), Inner Drive Entertainment (season 2), CMYK Games and Game Show Enterprises Studios |
| Adam's Law | 2026–present | Syndication | produced by Queen Bee Productions and Big Ticket Television |

Ad sales

| Title | Original run | Network | Notes |
|---|---|---|---|
| Divorce Court | 1999–present | Syndication | produced by Lincolnwood Drive, Inc.; syndicated by Fox First Run |
| Family Feud | 1999–present | Syndication | produced by Fremantle; syndicated by Debmar-Mercury |
| TMZ on TV | 2007–present | Syndication | produced by Fox Alternative Entertainment; syndicated by Fox First Run since 2021 |
| Are We There Yet? | 2010–2013 | TBS | produced by Revolution Studios, 5914 Entertainment Ltd., Cube Vision and Debmar-Mercury |
| Anger Management | 2012–2014 | FX | produced by Mohawk Productions, Revolution Studios, Estevez Sheen Productions, Twisted Television, Debmar-Mercury and Lionsgate Television |
| TMZ Live | 2012–present | Syndication | produced by Fox Alternative Entertainment; syndicated by Fox First Run since 2021 |
| BoJack Horseman | 2014–2020 | Netflix | produced by The Tornante Company, Boxer vs. Raptor and ShadowMachine |
| 25 Words or Less | 2018–present | Syndication | produced by Dino Bones Productions; syndicated by Fox First Run |
| Caught in Providence | 2018–2020 | Syndication | produced by CityLife Productions and Sociable! Entertainment; syndicated by Debmar-Mercury |
| The Conners | 2018–2025 | ABC | produced by Jax Media, Gilbert TV (season 1), Mohawk Productions, Werner Entertainment (season 1) and Sara + Tom (since season 2) |
| People Puzzler | 2021–2023 | Game Show Network | produced by Meredith Corporation, Start Entertainment, and Game Show Enterprises |
| Sherri | 2022–2026 | Syndication | produced by Talk WW Productions and Perler Productions (season 1); syndicated by Debmar-Mercury |

==== King World ====
| Title | Original run | Network | Notes |
|---|---|---|---|
| The Little Rascals | 1929–1938 | Theatrical | television distributor |
| Topper | 1953–1955 | CBS | distributor since 1984 |
| Branded | 1965–1966 | NBC | distributor since 1984; produced by Mark Goodson-Bill Todman Productions and Sentinel Productions |
| The Abbott and Costello Cartoon Show | 1967–1968 | Syndication | distribution only; produced by Hanna-Barbera and RKO General |
| The Guns of Will Sonnett | 1967–1969 | ABC | distributor since 1984; produced by Thomas/Spelling Productions |
| The Little Rascals Christmas Special | 1979 | NBC | television special |
| The Little Rascals (animated TV series) | 1982–1984 | ABC | |
| The Merv Griffin Show | 1983–1986 | Syndication | distributor; currently licensed by Reelin' In the Years Productions on behalf of The Griffin Group |
| Headline Chasers | 1985–1986 | Syndication | produced by Merv Griffin Enterprises and Wink Martindale Enterprises Inc. |
| Nightlife | 1986–1987 | Syndication | |
| The Rock 'n Roll Evening News | 1986–1987 | Syndication | with Andy Friendly Productions and A&M Records |
| True Confessions | 1986–1987 | Syndication | produced by The Landsburg Company; currently owned by the estate of Alan Landsburg |
| Women of the World | 1986–1988 | Syndication | |
| George Schlatter's Comedy Club | 1987–1988 | Syndication | with George Schlatter Productions |
| Geraldo/The Geraldo Rivera Show | 1987–1998 | Syndication | distribution from 1996 to 1998; produced by Investigative News Group and Tribune Entertainment |
| Offshore Television | 1988–1989 | Syndication | with Saban Entertainment; CBS co-owns the series with Disney-ABC Home Entertainment and Television Distribution |
| Monopoly | 1990 | ABC | with Merv Griffin Enterprises; currently owned by Hasbro Entertainment |
| Instant Recall | 1990–1992 | Syndication | |
| Bob Vila's Home Again/Bob Vila | 1990–2007 | Syndication | distribution from 2000 to 2007, continued from Group W/Eyemark Entertainment; currently owned by Bob Vila |
| The All-New Candid Camera | 1991–1992 | Syndication | |
| Wild West C.O.W.-Boys of Moo Mesa | 1992–1994 | ABC | co-production with Greengrass Productions and Gunther-Wahl Productions |
| The Les Brown Show | 1993–1994 | Syndication | |
| American Journal | 1993–1998 | Syndication | |
| Martha Stewart Living | 1993–2004 | Syndication | Previously distributed by Group W/Eyemark Entertainment; currently owned by Martha Stewart Living Omnimedia |
| Rolonda | 1994–1997 | Syndication | produced by Watts Works Productions |
| The Howard Stern Radio Show | 1998–2001 | Syndication | previously distributed by Eyemark Entertainment |
| Hollywood Squares | 1998–2004 | Syndication | with Columbia TriStar Television/Sony Pictures Television |
| The Roseanne Show | 1998–2000 | Syndication | with Full Moon & High Tide Productions |
| The Martin Short Show | 1999–2000 | Syndication | |
| 18 Wheels of Justice | 2000–2001 | TNN | Currently owned by Stu Segall Productions |
| The Cindy Margolis Show | 2000 | Syndication | |
| Curtis Court | 2000–2001 | Syndication | |
| The Ananda Lewis Show | 2001–2002 | Syndication | |
| Living It Up! with Ali & Jack | 2003–2004 | Syndication | |
| Rachael Ray | 2006–2023 | Syndication | co-production with Watch Entertainment, Scripps Networks (2006–2018)/Discovery Productions (2018–2022)/Warner Bros. Discovery (2022–2023), and Harpo Productions (2006–2010)/Harpo Studios (2010–2023) |
| Celebrity Squares | 2023–2024 | VH1 | co-production with Hartbeat Productions and Jesse Collins Entertainment |
| Hollywood Squares | 2025–present | CBS | copyright holder; produced by Jesse Collins Entertainment, Flower Films, and CBS Studios |

===== Eyemark Entertainment =====
Previously known as Group W Productions until 1995.

| Title | Original run | Network | Notes |
|---|---|---|---|
| PM East/PM West | 1961–1962 | Syndication | |
| The Mike Douglas Show | 1961–1981 | Syndication | |
| The Steve Allen Show (aka “Steve Allen Westinghouse Show”) | 1962–1964 | Syndication | Currently distributed by Retro Video |
| That Regis Philbin Show! | 1964–1965 | Syndication | |
| The Merv Griffin Show | 1965–1969 | Syndication | distributor; currently licensed by Reelin' In the Years Productions and distributed by Paul Brownstein Productions on behalf of The Griffin Group |
| The David Frost Show | 1969–1972 | Syndication | |
| Fight Back! with David Horowitz | 1976–1992 | Syndication | distributor; produced by Consuming Media, Ltd. |
| PM Magazine | 1976–1989 | Syndication | |
| Evening Magazine | 1976–1989 | Syndication | Same show as PM Magazine, but only shown on stations owned by Group W |
| The John Davidson Show | 1980–1982 | Syndication | |
| Hour Magazine | 1980–1989 | Syndication | |
| Every Second Counts | 1984–1985 | Syndication | Co-produced by Charles Colarusso Productions |
| The George Michael Sports Machine | 1984–2007 | Syndication | distribution only; produced by NBC affiliate WRC-TV; Currently owned by NBCUniversal Syndication Studios |
| The Wil Shriner Show | 1987–1988 | NBC, Syndication | with Charles Colarusso Productions & Bonnie Burns Productions |
| Teenage Mutant Ninja Turtles | 1987–1996 | Syndication/CBS | co-production with Murakami-Wolf-Swenson/Murakami Wolf Dublin/Fred Wolf Films |
| Missing/Reward | 1988–1992 | Syndication | with Four Point Entertainment and Dave Bell Associates |
| Couch Potatoes | 1989 | Syndication | with Saban Entertainment |
| House Party | 1990 | Syndication | with NBC Productions |
| That's Amore | 1992–1993 | Syndication | co-production with Four Point Entertainment |
| Vicki! | 1992–1994 | Syndication | Co-production with Lawrence-Schultz Productions |
| Jones & Jury | 1994–1995 | Syndication | with Lighthearted Entertainment |
| Marilu | 1994 | Syndication | with Perpetual Motion Pictures and California Communications, Inc. |
| Day and Date | 1995–1997 | Syndication | |
| Psi Factor | 1996–2000 | Syndication | distribution only; produced by Alliance Atlantis; Currently owned by Lionsgate Television and SP Media Group |
| Everybody Loves Raymond | 1996–2005 | CBS | television distributor; produced by Where's Lunch, Worldwide Pants and HBO Independent Productions; HBO owns the copyrights and home media rights |
| The Gayle King Show | 1997–1998 | Syndication | |
| Pensacola: Wings of Gold | 1997–2000 | Syndication | produced by Partners Station Network and Dauphine Productions; Currently owned by Stu Segall Productions |
| The Dr. Joy Browne Show | 1999–2000 | Syndication | |

=== Pop Media Group ===
| Title | Years | Network | Co-production with |
|---|---|---|---|
| Sing it On | 2015–2016 | Pop | Core Media Group, Sharp Entertainment and Get Lifted Film Co. |
| Easiest Game Show Ever | 2016 | Pop | Nigel Lithgoe Productions and The Jackal Group |
| Hollywood Darlings | 2017–2018 | Pop | All3Media America and Main Event Media |
| Hot Date | 2017–2019 | Pop | Electric Avenue Productions, Artists First, Propagate Content and Big Breakfast |

=== Rysher Entertainment ===
CBS Media Ventures owns the distribution rights to the Rysher Entertainment television library, which is currently owned by Shamrock Capital. Rysher Entertainment for Boy Meets World, Good Luck Charlie, ICarly, Victorious, Pound Puppies (1986 TV series), Full House, Frasier, Sister, Sister (TV series), Blue's Clues, Everybody Loves Raymond, Cheers, and That's So Raven.

| Title | Years | Network | Notes |
|---|---|---|---|
| The Hitchhiker | 1983–1991 | HBO/USA Network | distributor since 1995 |
| Saved by the Bell | 1989–1993 | NBC | distributor; produced by Peter Engel Productions and NBC Productions |
| Captain N & the Video Game Masters | 1992–1993 | Syndication | syndicated re-cuts of Super Mario World, The Adventures of Super Mario Bros. 3, The Legend of Zelda and Captain N the Game Master, produced by DiC Enterprises |
| Uptown Comedy Club | 1992–1994 | Syndication, BET | with Bob Banner Productions and Don Weiner Productions |
| Prime Suspect | 1992–1995 | Syndication | Co-production with Byrne Enterprises |
| Highlander: The Series | 1992–1998 | Syndication | season 1 distributed by Gaumont Television co-produced with Reteitalia and Gaumont Television |
| California Dreams | 1992–1996 | NBC | former domestic syndicator and financer; produced by Peter Engel Productions and NBC Productions. Currently distributed outside of the U.S. by MGM Worldwide Television Distribution |
| Return to Lonesome Dove | 1993 | CBS | mini-series distributor |
| Thunder in Paradise | 1994 | Syndication | with Berk/Schwartz/Bonann Productions and Trimark Pictures; Certain episodes of the series are co-owned with Lionsgate |
| RoboCop | 1994 | CTV; Syndication | with Skyvision Productions and Rigel Entertainment; Currently owned by Amazon MGM Studios |
| Lonesome Dove: The Series | 1994–1996 | Syndication | with Telegenic Pictures and RHI Entertainment |
| One West Waikiki | 1994–1996 | CBS/Syndication | with Larson Entertainment |
| VR.5 | 1995 | Fox | with Samoset Productions |
| Live Shot | 1995–1996 | UPN | with Occasionally Brilliant and Steve Marshall Productions |
| George & Alana | 1995–1996 | Syndication | with George Hamilton Productions and Lighthearted Entertainment |
| F/X: The Series | 1996–1998 | CTV; Syndication | with Fireworks Entertainment |
| Strange Universe | 1996–1998 | Syndication | with Chris-Craft Television |
| Nash Bridges | 1996–2001 | CBS | with The Don Johnson Company and Carlton Cuse Productions; continued by Paramount Network Television |
| Arli$$ | 1996–2002 | HBO | International distribution only; produced by Tollin/Robbins Productions (1996–1998), Marquee/Tollin/Robbins (1998–2002) and HBO Original Programming |
| Dellaventura | 1997–1998 | CBS | with Hallmark Entertainment; Copyrights owned by Chicken Soup for the Soul Entertainment |
| Soldier of Fortune, Inc. | 1997–1999 | Syndication | with Don Simpson-Jerry Bruckheimer Films |
| Oz | 1997–2003 | HBO | with The Levinson/Fontana Company, Viacom Productions (seasons 4–5) and HBO Original Programming; Distributed in the U.S. by Warner Bros. Television Distribution |
| Judge Mills Lane | 1998–2001 | Syndication | co-produced by Tomlin-Young Productions and Hurricane Entertainment Group; continued by Paramount Domestic Television |
| Sex and the City | 1998–2004 | HBO | international distributor; produced by Darren Star Productions and HBO Entertainment (owner) |

==== Bing Crosby Productions ====
| Title | Original run | Network | Notes |
|---|---|---|---|
| Ben Casey | 1961–1966 | ABC | previously distributed by ABC Films/Worldvision Enterprises |
| Breaking Point | 1963–1964 | ABC | previously distributed by ABC Films/Worldvision Enterprises |
| The Bing Crosby Show | 1964–1965 | ABC | |
| Slattery's People | 1964–1965 | CBS | co-produced with Pendick Enterprises previously distributed by CBS Enterprises/Viacom |
| Hogan's Heroes | 1965–1971 | CBS | co-produced with Alfran Productions and The CBS Television Network previously distributed by CBS Enterprises/Viacom |
| The Queen & I | 1969 | CBS | previously distributed by CBS Enterprises/Viacom |
| Bright Promise | 1969–1972 | NBC | with Frandor Productions |

==== Television Program Enterprises ====
| Title | Original run | Network | Co-production with |
|---|---|---|---|
| Star Search | 1983–1995 | Syndication | Bob Banner Associates (1983–88), Metromedia Television (1983–86) |
| Lifestyles of the Rich and Famous | 1984–1995 | Syndication | Leach Entertainment Features and Al Masini Productions |
| The Start of Something Big | 1985–1986 | Syndication | Leach Entertainment Features |
| You Write The Songs | 1986 | Syndication | |
| Fame, Fortune and Romance | 1986–1987 | ABC | Leach Entertainment Features |
| Runaway with the Rich and Famous | 1987–1993 | Syndication | |
| Triple Threat | 1988–1993 | Syndication; BET | |
| Preview the Best of the New | 1990 | Syndication | |
| Home Videos of the Stars | 1992 | Syndication | |

=== Paramount Television Studios ===
| Title | Network | Year(s) | Co-production with | Notes | Status |
|---|---|---|---|---|---|
| CMT Music Awards | CMT/CBS | 1964–2024 | Switched On Entertainment | | Ongoing |
| MTV Video Music Awards | MTV | 1984–present | Den of Thieves | Took over production from MTV Entertainment Studios | Ongoing |
| Nickelodeon Kids' Choice Awards | Nickelodeon | 1988–present | Bob Bain Productions (2001–14), T-Rox (2001), GHS Productions (2015–22), ROK Productions (2016–19), Dempsey Productions (2016–22), Den of Thieves (2023) and Done and Dusted (2024–present) | Took over production from Nickelodeon Productions | Ongoing |
| Beavis and Butt-Head | MTV; Paramount+/Comedy Central | 1993–1997; 2011; 2022–present | MTV Animation (seasons 1–8), Titmouse, Inc. (seasons 9–), Judgmental Films and 3 Arts Entertainment | Take over production from MTV Entertainment Studios | Ongoing |
| South Park | Comedy Central | 1997–present | Comedy Partners and South Park Digital Studios | Take over production from MTV Entertainment Studios | Ongoing |
| The Challenge | MTV | 1998–present | Bunim/Murray Productions | Take over production from MTV Entertainment Studios | Ongoing |
| CMT Crossroads | CMT | 2002–2024 | Country Music Television | | Ended |
| The Contender | NBC/ESPN/Versus; Epix | 2005–2009; 2018 | UAMG Content and Rogue Productions (season 1) | Took over production from DreamWorks Television for season 5 | Ended |
| Wild 'n Out | MTV/MTV2/VH1 | 2005–2007; 2013–present | Mr. Renassiance Entertainment (seasons 1–4), The Collective (seasons 1–4) and Ncredible Entertainment (season 5–) | Took over production from MTV Entertainment Studios | Ongoing |
| CMT Artists of the Year | CMT | 2010–present | Country Music Television and Switched On Entertainment | Took over production from MTV Entertainment Studios | Ongoing |
| Ridiculousness | MTV | 2011–2026 | Four Down Productions (Season 1), Superjacket Productions (Season 3–19), Thrill One Media (Season 20–present), Dickhouse Productions (Season 1–4) and Gorilla Flicks (Season 5–present) | Took over production from MTV Entertainment Studios | Ended |
| Love & Hip Hop: Atlanta | VH1/MTV | 2012–2026 | Monami Productions, Eastern TV (seasons 1–8), Big Fish Entertainment (season 9) and New Group Productions (season 10) | Took over production from MTV Entertainment Studios | Ended |
| Minority Report | Fox | 2015 | Amblin Television and 20th Century Fox Television | Based on the novel by Philip K. Dick; A television series sequel to the 2002 film by Scott Frank and Jon Cohen | Ended |
| Vinyl | HBO | 2016 | HBO Entertainment, Jagged Productions, Sikelia Productions, and Cold Front Productions | | Ended |
| School of Rock | Nickelodeon | 2016–2018 | Nickelodeon Productions, Armogida Brothers Productions and Passable Entertainment | Based on the 2003 film by Paramount Pictures | Ended |
| Shooter | USA Network | 2016–2018 | Leverage Entertainment, Closest to the Hole Productions, and Universal Cable Productions | Initially in development at TNT; Based on the 2007 film by Paramount Pictures | Ended |
| Berlin Station | Epix | 2016–2019 | Third State, Harbor Men Pictures (Season 1), Solid State Pictures (Season 3), Vanessa Productions, LTD., and Anonymous Content | | Ended |
| A Series of Unfortunate Events | Netflix | 2017–2019 | Sonnenfeld Productions, Inc. and What is the Question? | | Ended |
| 13 Reasons Why | Netflix | 2017–2020 | July Moon Productions, Kicked to the Curb Productions, That Kid Ed Productions, and Anonymous Content | | Ended |
| The Alienist | TNT | 2018–2020 | Vanessa Productions, Stuma Productions (Season 2), Anonymous Content and Studio T | | Ended |
| Condor | Audience/Epix | 2018–2020 | Apophasis Unproductions, Skydance Television and MGM Television | Based on the 1974 novel Six Days of the Condor by James Grady and its 1975 film adaptation Three Days of the Condor by Lorenzo Semple Jr. & David Rayfiel | Ended |
| Jack Ryan | Amazon Prime Video | 2018–2023 | Genre Arts, Push Boot., Sunday Night Productions, Platinum Dunes, Skydance Television and Amazon Studios | | Ended |
| Maniac | Netflix | 2018 | Parliament of Owls, Rubicon TV and Anonymous Content | | Miniseries |
| The Haunting of Hill House | Netflix | 2018 | FlanaganFilm and Amblin Television | | Miniseries |
| Boomerang | BET | 2019–2020 | 606 Television, DeEtte Productions (season 1) and Hillman Grad Productions | | Ended |
| The Disappearance of Madeleine McCann | Netflix | 2019 | Pulse Films | | Ended |
| Catch-22 | Hulu; Sky Atlantic (Italy) | 2019 | Lakeside Ultraviolet, Yoki Inc., Smokehouse Pictures and Anonymous Content | Based on the 1970 film by Paramount Pictures | Miniseries |
| The Last Cowboy | Paramount Network/CMT | 2019–present | Spike Cable Networks, Truly Original, Bosque Ranch Productions and 101 Studios | Took over production from MTV Entertainment Studios | Ongoing |
| Couples Therapy | Showtime | 2019–present | | Took over from Showtime Studios | Ongoing |
| First Wives Club | BET | 2019–2022 | Tracy Yvonne Productions and Jax Media | | Ended |
| Looking for Alaska | Hulu | 2019 | Temple Hill Entertainment and Fake Empire | | Miniseries |
| Watchmen | HBO | 2019 | Warner Bros. Television, DC Entertainment and White Rabbit | A television series sequel to the DC Comics comic limited series by Alan Moore and Dave Gibbons | Miniseries |
| Wonder Park | Unreleased | 2019–2020 | Nickelodeon Animation Studio, Ilion Animation Studios, and Paramount Animation | First television series from Paramount Animation; Based on the 2019 film by Paramount Pictures | Ended |
| Briarpatch | USA Network | 2020 | Universal Content Productions, Esmail Corp, Voodoo, Ltd. and Anonymous Content | | Ended |
| Home Before Dark | Apple TV+ | 2020–2021 | Electric Somewhere Co., Foxy Inc., Little Bear Ink and Anonymous Content | | Ended |
| When the Streetlights Go On | Quibi | 2020 | Anonymous Content | | Ended |
| Paradise Lost | Spectrum Originals | 2020 | Spike Cable Networks, Fishburne & Sons, Simon–Binx Productions and Anonymous Content | | Ended |
| Defending Jacob | Apple TV+ | 2020 | Mimir Films, Mark Bomback Productions and Anonymous Content | | Miniseries |
| Emily in Paris | Netflix | 2020–present | Darren Star Productions and Jax Media | Took over production from MTV Entertainment Studios; Originally ordered at Paramount Network | Renewed |
| The Haunting of Bly Manor | Netflix | 2020 | Intrepid Pictures and Amblin Television | | Miniseries |
| Dream Team: Birth of The Modern Athlete | Paramount+ | 2021 | Five All in the Fifth, Underground Films and The Malloys | | Miniseries |
| Made for Love | HBO Max | 2021–2022 | Ghost Moon and 3dot Productions | | Ended |
| Heels | Starz | 2021–2023 | O'Malley Ink, Cool Dog, LBI Entertainment and Lionsgate Television | | Ended |
| Foundation | Apple TV | 2021–present | Phantom Four | Took over production from Skydance Television | Renewed |
| Mayor of Kingstown | Paramount+ | 2021–present | Bosque Ranch Productions, 101 Studios and Square Head Pictures | Took over production from MTV Entertainment Studios | Renewed |
| Joe Pickett | Spectrum Originals/Paramount+ | 2021–2023 | Red Wagon Entertainment and Brothers Dowdle Productions | | Ended |
| Station Eleven | HBO Max | 2021–2022 | Super Frog, Pacesetter Productions, Stone Village Television, Shadowfox Productions and Tractor Beam | | Miniseries |
| Reacher | Amazon Prime Video | 2022–present | Skydance Television (Season 1-3), Amazon Studios and Blackjack Films | | Renewed |
| Long Slow Exhale | BET & Spectrum Originals | 2022 | Made Up Stories and Green Eggs and Pam Productions, Inc. | | Ended |
| Help! I'm in a Secret Relationship! | MTV | 2022–present | Sharp Entertainment | Took over production from MTV Entertainment Studios | Renewed |
| The Offer | Paramount+ | 2022 | DxD Films, The White Mountain Company and Black Mass Productions | | Miniseries |
| American Gigolo | Showtime | 2022 | Jerry Bruckheimer Television and Three Rivers Entertainment | Based on the film of the same name by Paul Schrader | Ended |
| Shantaram | Apple TV+ | 2022 | The 4 Keys, Bohemian Risk and Anonymous Content | Initially in development at Warner Bros. Pictures as a feature film | Ended |
| Tulsa King | Paramount+ | 2022–present | 101 Studios, Bosque Ranch Productions and Cold Front Productions | Took over production from MTV Entertainment Studios; Originally titled Kansas City | Ongoing |
| School Spirits | Paramount+ | 2023–present | | Took over production from Awesomeness | Ongoing |
| Grease: Rise of the Pink Ladies | Paramount+ | 2023 | Annabel Oakes & Friends, Picturestart and Temple Hill Entertainment | Previously ordered at HBO Max as Grease: Rydell High | Ended |
| Fatal Attraction | Paramount+ | 2023 | Nutmegger and Amblin Television | initially in development at Fox | Ended |
| XO, Kitty | Netflix | 2023–present | Jenny Kissed Me, Purple Pen Inc. and ACE Entertainment | Took over production from Awesomeness | Ongoing |
| Lioness | Paramount+ | 2023–present | 101 Studios, Cinestar, Blossom Films and Bosque Ranch Productions | Took over production from MTV Entertainment Studios; Also known as Special Ops: Lioness | Ongoing |
| The Spiderwick Chronicles | The Roku Channel | 2024 | 20th Television, Lightbulb Farm Productions and The Gotham Group | initially in development at Disney+ | Ended |
| Time Bandits | Apple TV+ | 2024 | Piki Films, Two Canoes Pictures, Anonymous Content, HandMade Films and MRC Television | Based on the 1981 film by Terry Gilliam | Ended |
| Before | Apple TV+ | 2024 | Jennilind Productions, My Name Is Cavale and Vanessa Productions | | Ended |
| Everybody Still Hates Chris | Comedy Central | 2024–present | CBS Eye Animation Productions, CBS Studios, Sanjay Shah Productions, CR Enterprises, Inc., 3 Arts Entertainment and Titmouse, Inc. | Took over production from MTV Entertainment Studios | Renewed |
| Aussie Shore | Paramount+ | 2024–present | | Took over production from MTV Entertainment Studios; First Australian production | Renewed |
| The Agency | Paramount+ | 2024–present | Smokehouse Pictures, 101 Studios, The Originals Productions and Federation Entertainment | Took over production from Showtime Studios | Renewed |
| Cross | Amazon Prime Video | 2024–present | Blue Monday Productions, Skydance Television (Season 1) and Amazon MGM Studios | | Renewed |
| Landman | Paramount+ | 2024–present | Bosque Ranch Productions, Imperative Entertainment, 101 Studios and Texas Monthly | Took over production from MTV Entertainment Studios | Renewed |
| MobLand | Paramount+ | 2025–present | 101 Studios, Easter Partisan Hardy Son & Baker and Toff Guy Studios | Took over production from MTV Entertainment Studios; First British production Originally developed as Ray Donovan spin-off The Donovans | Renewed |
| Murderbot | Apple TV | 2025–present | Phantom Four Films and Depth of Field | Based on The Murderbot Diaries by Martha Wells | Renewed |
| Dexter: Resurrection | Paramount+ Premium | 2025–present | Clyde Phillips Productions, Sal Centric and Counterpart Studios | Took over production from Showtime Studios; A sequel to Dexter: New Blood and Dexter; Based on the book series by Jeff Lindsay | Renewed |
| Hip Hop Was Born Here | Paramount+ | 2025–present | Omaha Productions and Rock The Bells Studios | Took over production from MTV Entertainment Studios | Renewed |
| Roast the Internet | Comedy Central UK | 2025–present | | Took over production from MTV Entertainment Studios; Second British production | Renewed |
| The Road | CBS | 2025–present | Lucky Horseshoe Productions, 101 Studios and Bosque Ranch Productions | | Ongoing |
| Marshals | CBS | 2026–present | Linson Entertainment, 101 Studios and Bosque Ranch Productions | Originally entitled Y: Marshals; A sequel and spin-off to Yellowstone created by Taylor Sheridan and John Linson | Renewed for season 2 |
| The Madison | Paramount+ | 2026–present | Linson Entertainment, 101 Studios and Bosque Ranch Productions | Originally developed as part of the Yellowstone franchise before turning into a stand-alone series; Previously titled 1944 | Renewed for season 2 |
| Dutton Ranch | Paramount+ | 2026–present | Linson Entertainment, 101 Studios and Bosque Ranch Productions | Took over production from MTV Entertainment Studios; A spin-off to Yellowstone | Ongoing |
| Ride or Die | Amazon Prime Video | 2026 | Amazon MGM Studios, Melodie Productions, Orit Entertainment, Good Session, Spring Tide Productions and Double Dream | Took over production from Skydance Television | Ended |
| Neagley | Amazon Prime Video | 2026–present | Amazon MGM Studios | Took over production from CBS Studios and Skydance Television; A spin-off to Reacher; Based on the character from the novel series by Lee Child | Renewed for season 2 |
| Brothers | Apple TV | 2026–present | Just Keep Livin Productions, Children at Play and Piece of Work Entertainment | Took over development from Skydance Television | Ongoing |
| Hollywood Arts | Netflix, Nickelodeon and Paramount+ | 2026–present | Jingle Jangle and Sweet Tea Productions | A spin-off and sequel to Victorious by Dan Schneider; Originally ordered at Nickelodeon | Ongoing |
| 12 12 12 | Apple TV | 2026–present | Anonymous Content, 87 Films, Inspire Entertainment, Make It With Gravy and Skogland Films | Took over development & production from Skydance Television | Ongoing |
Upcoming
| Neuromancer | Apple TV | 2027 | Anonymous Content and DreamCrew Entertainment | Took over production from Skydance Television | |
| The Best of Us | Paramount+ | 2027 | Sister | Assumed production & development from Skydance Television | |
| Laird | Paramount+ | 2027 | 101 Studios | | |
| Sword Art Online | Netflix | TBA | | Took over production from Skydance Television; Based on the Japanese light novel series of the same name by Reki Kawahara | |
| Rodgers & Hammerstein's Cinderella | Disney+ | TBA | Nuyorican Productions and Concord Originals | Took over production from Skydance Television; A drama adaptation of the Rodgers and Hammerstein television musical Cinderella; Based on the fairy tale of the same name | |
| Hotel del Luna | TBA | TBA | CJ ENM and Studio Dragon | Took over production from Skydance Television; Based on the South Korean television series of the same name. | |
| Jane Smith | HBO Max | TBA | MGM Television, Big Picture Co., James Patterson Entertainment and David E. Kelley Productions | Took over production from Skydance Television | |
| Frisco King | Paramount+ | TBA | 101 Studios | Took over from MTV Entertainment Studios; A spin-off from Tulsa King; Originally titled NOLA King | |

==== MTV Entertainment Studios ====
| Title | Years | Network | Co-production with |
|---|---|---|---|
| U.S. of Ant | 2006 | Logo | |
| My First Time | 2006 | TV Land | |
| TV Land: Myths and Legends | 2007–2008 | TV Land | Gay Rosenthal Productions |
| The Big Gay Sketch Show | 2007–2010 | Logo | Oh Really! Productions |
| The Big 4-0 | 2008 | TV Land | 3 Ball Productions |
| She's Got the Look | 2008–2010 | TV Land | |
| Outsiders Inn | 2008 | CMT | |

==== Showtime Studios ====
| Title | Years | Network | Notes |
|---|---|---|---|
| Hollywood Close-Up with Bill Harris | 1981–1987 | Showtime | |
| Hollywood Top Ten | 1982–1987 | Showtime | |
| Celebrity Lifestyles | 1983 | Showtime | |
| That's Stupid! | 1983–1984 | Showtime | |
| Showtime Championship Boxing | 1986–2023 | Showtime | |
| Linc's | 1998–2000 | Showtime | co-production with Tim Reid Productions and Viacom Productions |
| Beggars and Choosers | 1999–2000 | Showtime | |
| Queer as Folk | 2000–2005 | Showtime | co-production with Cowlip Productions, Tony Jonas Productions, Temple Street Productions, Channel 4 and Warner Bros. Television |
| Queer Duck | 2002–2004 | Showtime | |
| Family Business | 2003–2006 | Showtime | co-production with Maxwell Productions |
| Free for All | 2003 | Showtime | |
| The Opposite Sex | 2003 | Showtime | co-production with Hensel Krasnow Productions |
| Penn & Teller: Bullshit! | 2003–2010 | Showtime | |
| The L Word | 2004–2009 | Showtime | co-production with Anonymous Content, Dufferin Gate Productions, Coast Mountain Films, Posse and MGM Television |
| Fat Actress | 2005 | Showtime | co-production with Production Partners |
| Sleeper Cell | 2005–2006 | Showtime | |
| Brotherhood | 2006–2008 | Showtime | co-production with Gangtackle Productions and Mandalay Television |
| Dexter | 2006–2013 | Showtime | co-production with The Colleton Company, John Goldwyn Productions, Clyde Philips Productions (seasons 2–5), 801 Productions (season 6) and Devilina Productions (seasons 7–8) |
| Californication | 2007–2014 | Showtime | co-production with Totally Commercial Films, Twilight Time Films, And Then... and Aggressive Mediocrity |
| This American Life | 2007–2009 | Showtime | |
| Inside the NFL | 2008–2023 | Showtime/ Paramount+ | co-production with CBS Sports and NFL Films |
| Lock 'N Load | 2009 | Showtime | co-production with Authentic Entertainment |
| Nurse Jackie | 2009–2015 | Showtime | co-production with Caryn Mandabach Productions, Madison Grain Elevator (seasons 1–4), De Long Lumber Company (seasons 1–4), Clyde Philips Productions (seasons 5–7) Jackson Group Entertainment and Lionsgate Television |
| United States of Tara | 2009–2011 | Showtime | co-production with DreamWorks Television |
| The Green Room with Paul Provenza | 2010–2011 | Showtime | |
| The Real L Word | 2010–2012 | Showtime | co-production with Little Chicken, Inc. and Magical Elves Productions |
| Episodes | 2011–2017 | Showtime; BBC Two | co-production with Hat Trick Productions and Crane/Klarik Productions |
| Gigolos | 2011–2016 | Showtime | co-production with The Jay & Tony Show and RelativityREAL |
| Web Therapy | 2011–2015 | Showtime | co-production with Is or Isn't Entertainment and L Studio |
| Homeland | 2011–2020 | Showtime | co-production with Teakwood Lane Productions, Cherry Pie Productions, Keshet International and Fox 21 Television Studios |
| Dave's Old Porn | 2011–2012 | Showtime | co-production with Choadville Entertainment |
| House of Lies | 2012–2016 | Showtime | co-production with Crescendo Productions, Totally Commercial Films, Refugee Productions and Matthew Carnahan Circus Products |
| Inside Comedy | 2012–2015 | Showtime | co-production with Carousel Productions and Sunset Point Productions |
| Polyamory: Married & Dating | 2012–2013 | Showtime | co-production with BermanBraun |
| 60 Minutes Sports | 2013–2017 | Showtime | co-production with CBS News |
| Ray Donovan | 2013–2020 | Showtime | co-production with The Mark Gordon Company, Ann Biderman Co., Bider Sweete Productions and David Hollander Productions |
| Time of Death | 2013 | Showtime | co-production with Magical Elves Productions |
| Penny Dreadful | 2014–2016 | Showtime; Sky Atlantic | co-production with Desert Wolf Productions and Neal Street Productions |
| The Affair | 2014–2019 | Showtime | co-production with Sheleg and Highwater |
| Happyish | 2015 | Showtime | co-production with In Cahoots Media Inc. |
| 3AM | 2015 | Showtime | co-production with Wolf Films and Left/Right Productions |
| A Season with Notre Dame Football | 2015–2016 | Showtime | co-production with Crazy Legs Productions, Stone & Company Entertainment and IMG Productions |
| The Circus: Inside the Greatest Political Show on Earth | 2016–2023 | Showtime | co-production with Left/Right Productions and Bloomberg Politics |
| Billions | 2016–2023 | Showtime | co-production with Best Available! and TBTF Productions, Inc. |
| Dark Net | 2016–2017 | Showtime | co-production with Vocativ and Part 2 Pictures |
| Dice | 2016–2017 | Showtime | co-production with Olé Productions, American Work, Inc. and Fox 21 Television Studios |
| Twin Peaks | 2017 | Showtime | Lynch/Frost Productions, Twin Peaks Productions and Rancho Rosa Partnership |
| I'm Dying Up Here | 2017–2018 | Showtime | co-production with Some Kind of Garden, Assembly Entertainment, Endemol Shine North America and Plymouth Street Productions |
| Naked SNCTM | 2017–2018 | Showtime | co-production with The Jay & Tony Show, Paracosm, SNCTM Media and Critical Content |
| White Famous | 2017 | Showtime | co-production with Aggressive Mediocrity, Inc., Foxxhole Productions and Lionsgate Television |
| SMILF | 2017–2019 | Showtime | co-production with Supahsmaht Productions, Quantity Entertainment, Groundswell Productions, and ABC Signature |
| Patrick Melrose | 2018 | Showtime; Sky Atlantic (United Kingdom) | co-production with Two Cities Television, Rachel Horovitz Prods., SunnyMarch TV and Little Island Productions |
| Just Another Immigrant | 2018 | Showtime | co-production with Ranga Bee Productions, Renegade 83 and JSA Olive Oil |
| Who Is America? | 2018 | Showtime | co-production with Four By Two Television and Spelthorne Community Television |
| Kidding | 2018–2020 | Showtime | |
| Escape at Dannemora | 2018 | Showtime | co-production with BZ Entertainment, Michael De Luca Productions, The White Mountain Company, Busy Hands, and Red Hour Productions |
| Black Monday | 2019–2021 | Showtime | co-production with Shark Vs. Bear, Jordan Productions, Point Grey Pictures and Sony Pictures Television |
| On Becoming a God in Central Florida | 2019 | Showtime | co-production with Smokehouse Pictures, Pali Eyes Pictures and TriStar Television |
| Desus & Mero | 2019–2022 | Showtime | co-production with Bodega Boys Original, Chopped Cheese and Jax Media |
| Wu-Tang Clan: Of Mics and Men | 2019 | Showtime | co-production with Sony Music, PolyGram Entertainment, Endeavor Content and Mass Appeal |
| City on a Hill | 2019–2022 | Showtime | co-production with Pearl Street Films, The Levinson/Fontana Company and Little Mountain Films |
| The Loudest Voice | 2019 | Showtime | co-production with 3dot Productions, Slow Pony and Blumhouse Television |
| Shangri-La | 2019 | Showtime | co-production with Tremolo Productions |
| Murder in the Bayou | 2019 | Showtime | |
| The L Word: Generation Q | 2019–2023 | Showtime | co-production with Little Chicken Inc. and MLR Original |
| Work in Progress | 2019–2021 | Showtime | co-production with Monday Productions, Squirrel Soup, Circle of Confusion and Jax Media |
| Vice | 2020–2023 | Showtime | co-production with Vice Media |
| Penny Dreadful: City of Angels | 2020 | Showtime | co-production with Desert Wolf Productions and Neal Street Productions |
| The Good Lord Bird | 2020 | Showtime | co-production with Under The Influence, Mark 248 Entertainment and Blumhouse Television |
| Moonbase 8 | 2020 | Showtime | co-production with Antigravico, Interesting Situations, Harlequitten Inc, Top Drawer Entertainment Inc., Abso Lutely Productions and A24 |
| Ziwe | 2021–2022 | Showtime | co-production with A24 and Generation Ziwe |
| Flatbush Misdemeanors | 2021–2022 | Showtime | co-production with Avalon Television, Born Tired and Pebo's Perkin |
| UFO | 2021 | Showtime | co-production with Bad Robot, Zipper Bros. Films, Diamond Docs and Shutter Island Picture Co. |
| Dexter: New Blood | 2021–2022 | Showtime | co-production with Clyde Philips Productions, John Goldwyn Productions and The Colleton Company |
| American Rust | 2021; 2024 | Showtime | co-production with SouthSlope Pictures and Boat Rocker Studios |
| Yellowjackets | 2021–2026 | Showtime | co-production with Entertainment One, Beer Christmas and Lockjaw |
| Super Pumped | 2022 | Showtime | co-production with Best Available! |
| Halo | 2022–2024 | Paramount+ | co-production with Amblin Television, 343 Industries, One Big Picture and Chapter Eleven |
| I Love That for You | 2022 | Showtime | co-production with The First Todd, Say Mama, Go Balloons, Semi-Formal Productions and Annapurna Television; Previously titled 'Big Deal' and 'I Love This for You' |
| Let the Right One In | 2022 | Showtime | co-production with Colossal Productions, Hammer and Tomorrow Studios; Originally ordered at A&E and TNT |
| Three Women | 2023 | Starz | co-production with All Dogs Inn and Upside |
| The Curse | 2023–2024 | Showtime | co-production with A24, Fruit Tree, Blow Out Productions and Elara Pictures |
| Fellow Travelers | 2023 | Showtime | co-production with Blue Days Films, Off-Season Productions and Fremantle |
| Ripley | 2024 | Netflix | co-production with Endemol Shine North America, Entertainment 360, Diogenes Entertainment and FILMRIGHTS |
| Dexter: Original Sin | 2024–2025 | Paramount+ | co-production with Clyde Phillips Productions, Sal Centric, and Counterpart Studios |

===== Showtime Documentary Films =====
| Title | Years | Network | Co-production with |
|---|---|---|---|
| Love Fraud | 2020 | Showtime | Showtime Networks, Topic Studios and Loki Films |
| Gossip | 2021 | Showtime | Showtime Networks and Imagine Documentaries |
| Buried | 2021 | Showtime | Showtime Networks and Guendelman & Timor Productions |
| We Need to Talk About Cosby | 2022 | Showtime | co-production with Boardwalk Pictures and WKB Industries |
| The Lincoln Project | 2022 | Showtime | The Othrs, Bloomfish Productions and Impact Partners |
| Murder in Big Horn | 2023 | Showtime | co-production with Fairhaven |
| Deadlocked: How America Shaped the Supreme Court | 2023 | Showtime | co-production with Trilogy Films |

==== Nickelodeon Productions ====
| Title | Years | Network | Notes |
|---|---|---|---|
| Pinwheel | 1977–1984 | Channel C-3/Nickelodeon | Debuted less than two years prior to Nickelodeon's actual launch in 1979. |
| America Goes Bananaz | 1977–1980 | QUBE/Nickelodeon | Debuted less than two years prior to Nickelodeon's actual launch in 1979. |
| Nickel Flicks | 1979 | Nickelodeon | |
| By the Way | 1979 | Nickelodeon | |
| Hocus Focus | 1979–1981 | Nickelodeon | |
| Video Comic Book | 1979–1981 | Nickelodeon | |
| Livewire | 1980–1985 | Nickelodeon | |
| Reggie Jackson's World of Sports | 1981–1983 | Nickelodeon | |
| You Can't Do That on Television | 1981–1990 | Nickelodeon | |
| Kids' Writes | 1981–1983 | Nickelodeon | co-production with Embassy Television |
| Against the Odds | 1982–1984 | Nickelodeon | |
| Standby...Lights! Camera! Action! | 1982–1987 | Nickelodeon | |
| Going Great | 1983–1984 | Nickelodeon | |
| Nick Rocks | 1984–1989 | Nickelodeon | |
| Out of Control | 1984–1985 | Nickelodeon | |
| Turkey Television | 1985–1986 | Nickelodeon | |
| Double Dare | 1986–1993 | Nickelodeon | |
| Rated K: For Kids, By Kids | 1986–1988 | Nickelodeon | |
| Finders Keepers | 1987–1988 | Nickelodeon | |
| Kids' Court | 1988–1989 | Nickelodeon | |
| Don't Just Sit There | 1988–1991 | Nickelodeon | |
| Total Panic | 1989–1990 | Nickelodeon | |
| Think Fast | 1989–1990 | Nickelodeon | |
| Make the Grade | 1989–1990 | Nickelodeon | |
| Hey Dude | 1989–1991 | Nickelodeon | |
| On the Television | 1990–1991 | Nickelodeon | |
| SK8-TV | 1990 | Nickelodeon | |
| Wild & Crazy Kids | 1990–1992; 2002 | Nickelodeon | co-production with Woody Fraser Productions and Reeves Entertainment Group |
| Outta Here! | 1990–1991 | Nickelodeon | |
| Fifteen | 1991–1993 | Nickelodeon; YTV (Canada) | Currently distributed by Peter Rodgers Organization |
| Welcome Freshmen | 1991–1994 | Nickelodeon | |
| The Adventures of Pete & Pete | 1991–1996 | Nickelodeon | co-production with Gordon Productions (1993–1995) and Wellsville Productions (1995–1996) |
| Clarissa Explains It All | 1991–1994 | Nickelodeon | co-production with Thunder Pictures |
| Nickelodeon Launch Box | 1991–1994 | Nickelodeon | co-production with NASA and Astronauts Memorial Foundation |
| Salute Your Shorts | 1991–1992 | Nickelodeon | co-production with Propaganda Films |
| Hi Honey, I'm Home! | 1991–1992 | ABC/Nick at Nite | co-production with RiPe Productions |
| What Would You Do? | 1991–1993 | Nickelodeon | co-production with Woody Fraser Productions and Reeves Entertainment |
| Nickelodeon Arcade | 1992 | Nickelodeon | co-production with Bethea-Miteff Productions, Inc. |
| Nick News with Linda Ellerbee | 1992–2015 | Nickelodeon | co-production with Lucky Duck Productions |
| Roundhouse | 1992–1995 | Nickelodeon | co-production with Rebel Entertainment |
| Are You Afraid of the Dark? | 1992–1996; 1999–2000; 2019–2022 | Nickelodeon; YTV/Family Channel (Canada) | co-production with Cinar (original), WildBrain and ACE Entertainment (revival) |
| The Wild Side Show | 1992–1994 | Nickelodeon | co-production with Atlantis Films and Safari Productions, Inc. |
| Nickelodeon Guts | 1992–1996 | Nickelodeon | co-production with Chauncey Street Productions |
| Weinerville | 1993–1996 | Nickelodeon | |
| U to U | 1994–1995 | Nickelodeon | |
| The Secret World of Alex Mack | 1994–1998 | Nickelodeon | co-production with Lynch Entertainment and RHI Entertainment/Hallmark Entertainment; Rights co-owned with Chicken Soup for the Soul Entertainment |
| All That | 1994–2005; 2019–2020 | Nickelodeon | co-production with Tollin/Robbins Productions (seasons 1–10), Schneider's Bakery (season 10), DJKay Entertainment (season 11) and Kevin & Heath Productions (season 11) |
| My Brother and Me | 1994–1995 | Nickelodeon | co-production with Burns & Burns |
| Nick in the Afternoon | 1995–1998 | Nickelodeon | Interstitial series |
| Space Cases | 1996–1997 | Nickelodeon | co-production with Cinar |
| The Mystery Files of Shelby Woo | 1996–1999 | Nickelodeon | co-production with Out of My Mind Productions and Cinar (season 4) |
| Kenan & Kel | 1996–2000 | Nickelodeon | co-production with Tollin/Robbins Productions |
| Figure It Out | 1997–1999; 2012–2013 | Nickelodeon | |
| The Journey of Allen Strange | 1997–2000 | Nickelodeon | co-production with Lynch Entertainment |
| You're On! | 1998–1999 | Nickelodeon | co-production with Marjesam Productions |
| Cousin Skeeter | 1998–2001 | Nickelodeon | co-production with Tollin/Robbins Productions |
| 100 Deeds for Eddie McDowd | 1999–2002 | Nickelodeon | co-production with Lynch Entertainment, Lincoln Field Productions, and Fireworks Entertainment; Distributed outside of the U.S. by Quiver Distribution |
| The Amanda Show | 1999–2002 | Nickelodeon | co-production with Tollin/Robbins Productions |
| Double Dare 2000 | 2000 | Nickelodeon | |
| Slime Time Live | 2000–2004 | Nickelodeon | interstitial series |
| Caitlin's Way | 2000–2002 | Nickelodeon; YTV | co-production with Riverwood Productions, Fireworks Entertainment and Lynch Entertainment; Distributed outside of the US by Quiver Entertainment |
| The Brothers García | 2000–2004 | Nickelodeon | co-production with Sí TV |
| Noah Knows Best | 2000–2001 | Nickelodeon | co-production with Tested Ladder Entertainment |
| Taina | 2001–2002 | Nickelodeon | co-production with Dorado Productions; Distributed outside of the US by Nelvana |
| The Nick Cannon Show | 2002–2003 | Nickelodeon | co-production with Tollin/Robbins Productions |
| Nickelodeon Robot Wars | 2002 | Nickelodeon | co-production with Tinopolis; Based on the original British series Robot Wars |
| Scaredy Camp | 2002–2003 | Nickelodeon | |
| Romeo! | 2003–2006 | Nickelodeon | co-production with Tom Lynch Company and P. Miller Collection |
| Drake & Josh | 2004–2007 | Nickelodeon | co-production with Schneider's Bakery |
| Nickelodeon Splat! | 2004 | Nickelodeon | interstitial series |
| Ned's Declassified School Survival Guide | 2004–2007 | Nickelodeon | co-production with Jack Mackie Pictures and Apollo ProMovie |
| Unfabulous | 2004–2007 | Nickelodeon | |
| Zoey 101 | 2005–2008 | Nickelodeon | co-production with Schneider's Bakery, Apollo ProMovie and Dolphin Entertainment |
| The Search for the Funniest Mom in America | 2005–2007 | Nick at Nite | |
| Hi-Jinks | 2005–2006 | Nick at Nite | |
| Friday Night Slimetime | 2005–2006 | Nickelodeon | interstitial series |
| Just for Kicks | 2006 | Nickelodeon | co-production with Brookwell McNamara Entertainment and Lil' Whoop Productions |
| Let's Just Play Go Healthy Challenge | 2006–2007 | Nickelodeon | |
| Just Jordan | 2007–2008 | Nickelodeon | co-production with Rosa Floribunda Productions (season 2) |
| The Naked Brothers Band | 2007–2009 | Nickelodeon | co-production with Kidzhouse Entertainment and Worldwide Biggies |
| iCarly | 2007–2012 | Nickelodeon | co-production with Schneider's Bakery |
| Dance on Sunset | 2008 | Nickelodeon | |
| Queen Bees | 2008 | The N | co-production with Endemol USA |
| The N's Student Body | 2008 | The N | |
| My Family's Got Guts | 2008–2009 | Nickelodeon | co-production with Worldwide Biggies and Five Alts Productions, LLC |
| True Jackson, VP | 2008–2011 | Nickelodeon | co-production with Gordon 3000 Industries |
| The Troop | 2009–2011 | Nickelodeon/Nicktoons | co-production with The Writers Room, No Equal Entertainment and Tom Lynch Company Studios |
| BrainSurge | 2009–2011 | Nickelodeon; Nick at Nite/Nicktoons | co-production with Stone & Company Entertainment and 310 Entertainment |
| Big Time Rush | 2009–2013 | Nickelodeon | co-production with Jack Mackie Pictures and Sony Music |
| Victorious | 2010–2013 | Nickelodeon | co-production with Schneider's Bakery and Sony Music |
| House of Anubis | 2011–2013 | Nickelodeon/TeenNick; Nickelodeon UK | co-production with Studio 100 and Lime Pictures; A British/American adaptation of the Belgian series Heit Huis Anubis created by Anjali Taneja, Hans Bourlon and Gert Verhulst |
| Supah Ninjas | 2011–2013 | Nickelodeon | co-production with Varsity Pictures |
| Bucket & Skinner's Epic Adventures | 2011–2013 | Nickelodeon/TeenNick | co-production with Tom Lynch Company Studios and Bugliari/McLaughlin Productions |
| How to Rock | 2012 | Nickelodeon | co-production with Alloy Entertainment |
| Hollywood Heights | 2012 | Nick at Nite/TeenNick | co-production with Sony Pictures Television and Televisa |
| You Gotta See This | 2012–2014 | Nickelodeon/Nicktoons | co-production with Comcast Entertainment Studios |
| See Dad Run | 2012–2014 | Nick at Nite | co-production with Katlin/Bernstein Productions and Bischoff Hervey Entertainment |
| Marvin Marvin | 2012–2013 | Nickelodeon | co-production with The Collective |
| TeenNick Top 10 | 2012–2018 | TeenNick | co-production with Ncredible Entertainment |
| Wendell & Vinnie | 2013 | Nickelodeon/Nick at Nite | co-production with Passable Entertainment and Kapital Entertainment |
| Nick Studio 10 | 2013 | Nickelodeon | Interstitial series |
| Sam & Cat | 2013–2014 | Nickelodeon | co-production with Schneider's Bakery |
| AwesomenessTV | 2013–2015 | Nickelodeon | produced by Awesomeness |
| The Haunted Hathaways | 2013–2015 | Nickelodeon | co-production with Bugliari/McLaughlin Productions |
| Instant Mom | 2013–2015 | Nick at Nite/NickMom/TV Land | co-production with Stockholm Syndrome and Kapital Entertainment |
| The Thundermans | 2013–2018 | Nickelodeon | co-production with Cross Hoge Productions (season 3) and Dworkingham Productions (season 4) |
| Every Witch Way | 2014–2015 | Nickelodeon | co-production with Cinemat |
| Webheads | 2014–2015 | Nickelodeon | co-production with Ryan Seacrest Productions |
| Undercover Cupid | 2014 | NickMom | co-production with Stone & Company Entertainment |
| Nicky, Ricky, Dicky & Dawn | 2014–2018 | Nickelodeon | co-production with November 13 |
| 100 Things to Do Before High School | 2014–2016 | Nickelodeon | co-production with Jack Mackie Pictures |
| Henry Danger | 2014–2020 | Nickelodeon | co-production with Schneider's Bakery (seasons 1–4) |
| Bella and the Bulldogs | 2015–2016 | Nickelodeon | |
| Talia in the Kitchen | 2015 | Nickelodeon | co-production with Cinemat |
| Game Shakers | 2015–2019 | Nickelodeon | co-production with Schneider's Bakery |
| WITS Academy | 2015 | Nickelodeon | co-production with Cinemat |
| The HALO Effect | 2016 | Nickelodeon | |
| Paradise Run | 2016–2018 | Nickelodeon | |
| School of Rock | 2016–2018 | Nickelodeon | Armogida Brothers Productions, Passable Entertainment and Paramount Television; Based on the 2003 film by Paramount Pictures |
| Crashletes | 2016–2019 | Nickelodeon | co-production with Superjacket Productions |
| All In with Cam Newton | 2016 | Nickelodeon | |
| Legendary Dudas | 2016 | Nickelodeon | co-production with Stumper Bridgett Productions |
| Jagger Eaton's Mega Life | 2016–2017 | Nickelodeon | co-production with Superjacket Productions |
| Lip Sync Battle Shorties | 2016–2019 | Nickelodeon | co-production with Matador Content, Eight Million Plus Productions, Sunday Night Productions, Four Eyes Entertainment and Carey Patterson Entertainment; Spin-off from Lip Sync Battle |
| Hunter Street | 2017–2021 | Nickelodeon/TeenNick/Nickelodeon UK | co-production with Blooming Media |
| The Dude Perfect Show | 2017–2019 | Nickelodeon | co-production with Superjacket Productions; Originally aired on CMT in 2016 |
| I Am Frankie | 2017–2018 | Nickelodeon | co-production with Paradiso Pictures |
| Knight Squad | 2018–2019 | Nickelodeon | co-production with Dworkingham Productions |
| Keep It Spotless | 2018 | Nickelodeon | |
| Double Dare (revival) | 2018–2019 | Nickelodeon | co-production with Fremantle |
| Nick Cannon Presents: Fresh Artist | 2018–2019 | TeenNick | |
| Cousins for Life | 2018–2019 | Nickelodeon | co-production with Kevin & Heath Productions |
| The Substitute | 2019–2021 | Nickelodeon | co-production with The Intellectual Property Corporation |
| Ryan's Mystery Playdate | 2019–2023 | Nickelodeon/Nick Jr. | co-production with Sunlight Entertainment LLC and PocketWatch, Inc. |
| Are You Smarter than a 5th Grader? | 2019 | Nickelodeon | co-production with MGM Television and Hard Nocks South Productions |
| America's Most Musical Family | 2019–2020 | Nickelodeon | |
| Top Elf | 2019–2020 | Nickelodeon | co-production with Ugly Brother Studios, Main Event Media and All3Media America |
| The Crystal Maze | 2020 | Nickelodeon | co-production with Fizz, Stephen David Entertainment and Bunim/Murray Productions |
| Danger Force | 2020–2024 | Nickelodeon | |
| Group Chat | 2020 | Nickelodeon | |
| Nickelodeon's Unfiltered | 2020–2021 | Nickelodeon | |
| Unleashed | 2020 | Nickelodeon | co-production with Fremantle |
| Side Hustle | 2020–2022 | Nickelodeon | co-production with Eyebrow-Bird Productions |
| The Astronauts | 2020–2021 | Nickelodeon | co-production with Unmovies and Imagine Kids & Family |
| Tooned In | 2021–2022 | Nickelodeon | |
| Drama Club | 2021 | Nickelodeon | Also produced under the Awesomeness brand |
| The Barbarian and the Troll | 2021 | Nickelodeon | co-production with Mike Mitchell Productions and Brightlight Pictures |
| iCarly (revival) | 2021–2023 | Paramount+ | co-production with Museum Visit and Typical Bastard Productions (season 2); A reboot and sequel to the 2007 series by Dan Schneider |
| NFL Slimetime | 2021–present | Nickelodeon | co-production with CBS Sports |
| That Girl Lay Lay | 2021–2024 | Nickelodeon | co-production with Will Packer Productions and Manor House Entertainment |
| Legends of the Hidden Temple (revival) | 2021–2022 | The CW | co-production with Stone & Company Entertainment |
| Warped! | 2022 | Nickelodeon | co-production with Kevin & Heath Productions and DJKay Entertainment |
| The Fairly OddParents: Fairly Odder | 2022 | Paramount+ | co-production with Billionfold Inc. |
| The Really Loud House | 2022–2024 | Nickelodeon | co-production with 93rd Street Productions and Quick to Judge |
| Erin & Aaron | 2023 | Nickelodeon | co-production with Tom the Spider, Inc. and Dworkingham Productions |
| Avatar: The Last Airbender | 2024–present | Netflix | co-production with Rideback and Albert Kim Pictures |
| The Thundermans: Undercover | 2025–present | Nickelodeon | co-production with Thinky Boy and Dworkingham Productions |

=== Warner Bros. Television Studios ===
| Title | Genre | Years | Network | Co-production with | Notes |
|---|---|---|---|---|---|
| Warner Bros. Presents | Wheel series | 1955–1956 | ABC | | |
| Casablanca | Cold War spy/intrigue | 1955–1956 | ABC | | Based on the 1942 film by Warner Bros. Pictures |
| Cheyenne | Western | 1955–1962 | ABC | | |
| Conflict | Anthology | 1956–1957 | ABC | | |
| Sugarfoot | Western | 1957–1960 | ABC | | |
| Colt .45 | Western | 1957–1960 | ABC | | |
| Maverick | Western | 1957–1962 | ABC | | |
| Lawman | Western | 1958–1962 | ABC | | |
| Bronco | Western | 1958–1962 | ABC | | |
| 77 Sunset Strip | Crime drama | 1958–1964 | ABC | | |
| The Alaskans | Adventure | 1959–1960 | ABC | | |
| Bourbon Street Beat | Private detective | 1959–1960 | ABC | | |
| Hawaiian Eye | Private detective | 1959–1963 | ABC | | |
| The Bugs Bunny Show | Animated/Anthology | 1960–2000 | ABC/CBS | | |
| The Roaring 20's | Drama | 1960–1962 | ABC | | |
| Surfside 6 | Private detective | 1960–1962 | ABC | | |
| Room for One More | Sitcom | 1962 | ABC | | |
| The Gallant Men | Fiction | 1962–1963 | ABC | | |
| GE True | Anthology | 1962–1963 | CBS | | |
| The Dakotas | Western | 1963 | ABC | | |
| Temple Houston | Western | 1963–1964 | NBC | Apollo Productions, Inc. | |
| Wendy and Me | Sitcom | 1964–1965 | ABC | Natwill Productions | |
| No Time for Sergeants | Sitcom | 1964–1965 | ABC | McCadden Productions | Based on the 1958 film by Warner Bros. Pictures |
| F Troop | Sitcom | 1965–1967 | ABC | | |
| Mister Roberts | Sitcom | 1965–1966 | NBC | | |
| Hank | Sitcom | 1965–1966 | NBC | | |
| The F.B.I. | Police procedural | 1965–1974 | ABC | QM Productions | |
| The Road Runner Show | Animated/Anthology | 1966–1972 | CBS/ABC | | |
| Tarzan | Adventure | 1966–1968 | NBC | National General Corporation, Banner Productions | Distributor |
| The Chicago Teddy Bears | Sitcom | 1971 | CBS | Dean Jones Productions, Inc. | |
| The New Dick Van Dyke Show | Sitcom | 1971–1974 | CBS | | |
| Nichols | Western | 1971–1972 | NBC | Cherokee Productions | |
| The Jimmy Stewart Show | Sitcom | 1971–1972 | NBC | J-K/Ablidon Productions | |
| The Merrie Melodies Show | Anthology | 1972 | Syndication | | |
| Search | Science fiction | 1972–1973 | NBC | Leslie Stevens Productions | |
| Banyon | Detective fiction | 1972–1973 | NBC | QM Productions | |
| The Delphi Bureau | Dramatic television series | 1972–1973 | ABC | | |
| The Brian Keith Show | Sitcom | 1972–1974 | NBC | Miguel Productions | |
| The Streets of San Francisco | Crime drama | 1972–1977 | ABC | QM Productions (pilot and season one only) | |
| Kung Fu | Action | 1972–1975 | ABC | | |
| The Cowboys | Western | 1974 | ABC | | |
| Kodiak | Drama | 1974 | ABC | Kodiak Productions | |
| The New Land | Drama | 1974 | ABC | | |
| Shoulder to Shoulder | Historical drama | 1974 | BBC Two | BBC | mini-series |
| Harry O | Detective fiction | 1974–1976 | ABC | | |
| Give-n-Take | Game show | 1975 | CBS | | |
| The Neighbors | Game show | 1975–1976 | ABC | | |
| Wonder Woman | Superhero | 1975–1979 | ABC/CBS | The Douglas S. Cramer Company and Bruce Lansbury Productions, Ltd. | Based on Wonder Woman by William Moulton Marston and H. G. Peter |
| Alice | Sitcom | 1976–1985 | CBS | D'Angelo-Bullock-Allen Productions (1976–77) (season 1) | Based on the 1974 film Alice Doesn't Live Here Anymore by Robert Getchell |
| Code R | Action | 1977 | CBS | | |
| Rafferty | Medical drama | 1977 | CBS | | |
| Second Chance | Game show | 1977 | ABC | | |
| Roots | Historical drama | 1977 | ABC | | |
| The Fitzpatricks | Drama | 1977–1978 | CBS | | |
| The Daffy Duck Show | Animated/Anthology | 1978–1979 | NBC | | |
| Life on Earth | Nature documentary | 1979 | BBC Two | BBC Natural History Unit and Reiner E. Moritz Productions | |
| Roots: The Next Generations | Miniseries | 1979 | ABC | The Wolper Organization | |
| Time Express | Fantasy drama | 1979 | CBS | | |
| Dorothy | Sitcom | 1979 | CBS | The Konigsberg Company & Davis-Carroll Productions | |
| California Fever | Teen drama | 1979 | CBS | Lou Step Productions | |
| The Dukes of Hazzard | Action comedy | 1979–1985 | CBS | Paul R. Picard Productions and Piggy Productions, Inc. (season 1) Lou Step Productions (seasons 2–7) | |
| Young Maverick | Western | 1979–1980 | CBS | | |
| Flo | Sitcom | 1980–1981 | CBS | | |
| Enos | Sitcom | 1980–1981 | CBS | Lou Step Productions | |
| Freddie and the Bean | Action comedy | 1980–1981 | CBS | | Based on the 1974 film by Warner Bros. Pictures |
| Park Place | Sitcom | 1981 | CBS | Starry Night Productions | |
| Private Benjamin | Sitcom | 1981–1983 | CBS | | Based on the 1980 film by Warner Bros. Pictures |
| Love, Sidney | Sitcom | 1981–1983 | NBC | R.G. Productions Inc. | |
| Bret Maverick | Western | 1981–1982 | NBC | Cherokee Productions | |
| Bare Essence | Soap opera | 1983 | NBC | | |
| The Thorn Birds | Drama | 1983 | ABC | Edward Lewis Productions | mini-series |
| Casablanca | World War II spy/intrigue | 1983 | NBC | | Based on the 1942 film by Warner Bros. Pictures |
| The Dukes | Action comedy | 1983 | CBS | Hanna-Barbera | An expansion of The Dukes of Hazzard by Warner Bros. Television |
| Wizards and Warriors | Adventure | 1983 | CBS | Don Reo Productions | |
| High Performance | Adventure | 1983 | ABC | Lou Step Productions | |
| Goodnight, Beantown | Sitcom | 1983–1984 | CBS | Bixby-Brandon Productions Inc. | |
| The Mississippi | Legal drama | 1983–1984 | CBS | Ralph Waite Productions and Hajeno Productions | |
| The Yellow Rose | Soap opera | 1983–1984 | NBC | John Wilder-Michael Zinberg Productions | |
| Scarecrow and Mrs. King | Action | 1983–1987 | CBS | Shoot the Moon Enterprises Inc. and B&E Enterprises (episodes 1-11) | |
| Steambath | Comedy drama | 1984 | Showtime | Joe Byrne/Falrose and Pollock/Davis, Inc. | |
| V: The Series | Science fiction | 1984–1985 | NBC | Daniel H. Blatt-Robert Singer Productions | |
| Night Court | Sitcom | 1984–1992 | NBC | Starry Night Productions (seasons 1–6) | |
| Off the Rack | Sitcom | 1984–1985 | ABC | Brownstone and Mugwump Productions | |
| Eye to Eye | Detective Drama | 1985 | ABC | Eustis and Elias and an S. A. Vail Productions and Mut, Inc. | |
| Double Dare | Drama | 1985 | CBS | Terry Hughes Productions, December Enterprises, Inc. and Wanderers Productions, Inc. | |
| I Had Three Wives | Comedy drama | 1985 | CBS | Brownstone and Mugwump Productions | |
| Spenser: For Hire | Crime drama | 1985–1988 | ABC | John Wilder Productions (season 1) and Jadda Productions (season 2) | Based upon Spenser novels by Robert B. Parker |
| Growing Pains | Sitcom | 1985–1992 | ABC | Guntzelman-Sullivan-Marshall Productions (seasons 5–6) | |
| North and South | Historical fiction | 1985–1986; 1994 | ABC | David L. Wolper Productions | |
| Shadow Chasers | Science fiction | 1985–1986 | ABC | Kenneth Johnson/Brian Grazer Productions | |
| Head of the Class | Sitcom | 1986–1991 | ABC | Eustis/Elias Productions | |
| My Sister Sam | Sitcom | 1986–1988 | CBS | Pony Productions | |
| Shell Game | Comedy drama | 1987 | CBS | Lou-Step Productions | |
| Ohara | Police procedural | 1987–1988 | ABC | Imagine Television and M*ass Production | |
| The Days and Nights of Molly Dodd | Comedy drama | 1987–1991 | NBC/Lifetime | You And Me Kid Productions | |
| Full House | Sitcom | 1987–1995 | ABC | Jeff Franklin Productions and Miller-Boyett Productions | 1987–1988 episodes from Lorimar-Telepictures; 1988–1993 episodes from Lorimar Television |
| Just in Time | Sitcom | 1988 | ABC | | |
| China Beach | Medical drama/War | 1988–1991 | ABC | Sacret, Inc. | Inspired by Home Before Morning by Lynda Van Devanter |
| Police Academy: The Animated Series | Animated | 1988–1989 | Syndication | Ruby-Spears Enterprises | Based on the 1984 film and its sequels by Warner Bros. Pictures |
| Superman | Action | 1988 | Syndication | Ruby-Spears Enterprises | |
| Just the Ten of Us | Sitcom | 1988–1990 | ABC | Guntzelman-Sullivan-Marshall Productions | |
| Murphy Brown | Sitcom | 1988–1998; 2018 | CBS | Shukovsky-English Productions/Entertainment (Seasons 1–10) and Bend in the Road Productions (Season 11) | |
| Superboy | Superhero | 1988–1992 | Syndication | Alexander and Ilya Salkind Productions, Cantharus Productions, Lowry Productions and DC Comics | Distributed by CBS Media Ventures and Warner Bros. Television Distribution |
| A Man Called Hawk | Drama | 1989 | ABC | Hattman-Yates Productions and Avery Brooks Productions | Based upon the lead character by Robert B. Parker |
| Beetlejuice | Animated | 1989–1991 | ABC/Fox Kids | Tim Burton Inc., Nelvana and The Geffen Film Company | Based on the 1988 film by The Geffen Film Company |
| Tales from the Crypt | Horror/Anthology | 1989–1996 | HBO | Tales From the Crypt Holdings | |
| Life Goes On | Family drama | 1989–1993 | ABC | Toots Productions | |
| Family Matters | Sitcom | 1989–1998 | ABC/CBS | Bickley-Warren Productions and Miller-Boyett Productions | 1989–1993 episodes from Lorimar Television (seasons 1–4) |
| Molloy | Sitcom | 1990 | Fox | The Lee Rich Company | |
| The Flash | Superhero | 1990–1991 | CBS | Pet Fly Productions | |
| The Fresh Prince of Bel-Air | Sitcom | 1990–1996 | NBC | The Stuffed Dog Company, Quincy Jones Entertainment (1990–1993), (seasons 1–3), Quincy Jones-David Salzman Entertainment (1993–1996), (seasons 4–6) and NBC Productions | NBCUniversal owns the copyrights to the series, WB only handles worldwide distribution since 1994 |
| Swamp Thing | Science fiction | 1990–1993 | USA Network | Batfilm Productions, Inc., BBK Productions, Inc. DIC Entertainment and MCA Television Entertainment | Distributed by NBCUniversal Syndication Studios and Warner Bros. Domestic Television Distribution |
| Sisters | Family drama | 1991–1996 | NBC | Cowlip Productions | 1991–1993 episodes from Lorimar Television (1991–1993) (seasons 1–3) |
| Step by Step | Sitcom | 1991–1998 | ABC/CBS | Bickley-Warren Productions and Miller-Boyett Productions | 1991–1993 episodes from Lorimar Television (seasons 1–2) |
| Billy | Sitcom | 1992 | ABC | Eustis/Elias Productions | |
| Human Target | Action | 1992 | ABC | Pet Fly Productions | |
| Angel Street | Crime drama | 1992 | CBS | John Wells and Friends | |
| Room for Two | Sitcom | 1992 | ABC | Big Deal, Inc. and Phantom Productions | |
| Hangin' with Mr. Cooper | Sitcom | 1992–1997 | ABC | Bickley-Warren Productions and Jeff Franklin Productions | 1992–1993 episodes from Lorimar Television (season 1) |
| Family Dog | Animated | 1993 | CBS | Amblin Television, Tim Burton Inc., Nelvana and Universal Television | WB has international distribution rights outside the U.S., domestic distribution rights are handled by NBCUniversal Syndication Studios |
| Tall Hopes | Sitcom | 1993 | CBS | Eustis/Elias Productions | |
| The Trouble with Larry | Sitcom | 1993 | CBS | Highest Common Denominator Productions and Meleager Productions | |
| It Had to Be You | Sitcom | 1993 | CBS | Highest Common Denominator Productions | |
| Family Album | Sitcom | 1993 | CBS | Bright/Kauffman/Crane Productions | |
| Against the Grain | Drama | 1993 | NBC | The Lee Rich Company and Magnum Productions | |
| Time Trax | Science fiction | 1993–1994 | PTEN | Gary Nardino Productions | 1993 episodes from Lorimar Television (season 1) |
| Getting By | Sitcom | 1993–1994 | ABC/NBC | Bickley-Warren Productions and Miller-Boyett Productions | 1993 episodes from Lorimar Television (season 1) |
| The Adventures of Brisco County Jr. | Weird western | 1993–1994 | Fox | Boam/Cuse Productions | |
| Café Americain | Sitcom | 1993–1994 | NBC | Peter Noah Productions | |
| Living Single | Sitcom | 1993–1998 | Fox | SisterLee Productions (1994–1998) (seasons 2–5) | |
| Kung Fu: The Legend Continues | Action | 1993–1997 | PTEN | Warner Bros. Distributing Canada Ltd. | |
| Lois & Clark: The New Adventures of Superman | Superhero | 1993–1997 | ABC | Gangbuster Films, Inc. (pilot), Roundelay Productions (1993–1994) (season 1) and December 3 Productions (1994–1997) (seasons 2–4) | |
| The John Larroquette Show | Sitcom | 1993–1996 | NBC | Port Street Films, Impact Zone Productions and Witt/Thomas Productions | |
| Tales from the Cryptkeeper | Animated | 1993–1999 | ABC/CBS | EC Comics and Nelvana | Owned by Nelvana |
| Tom | Sitcom | 1994 | CBS | Wapello County Productions | |
| Free Willy | Animated | 1994 | ABC | Le Studio Canal+, Donner/Shuler-Donner Productions, Nelvana, Regency Enterprises and Warner Bros. Animation | Based on the 1993 film by Warner Bros. Pictures |
| Daddy's Girls | Sitcom | 1994 | CBS | Carydan Productions and Witt/Thomas Productions | |
| The George Carlin Show | Sitcom | 1994–1995 | Fox | Sweet Freedom Productions and Main Sequence | |
| On Our Own | Sitcom | 1994–1995 | ABC | Lightkeeper Productions, de Passe Entertainment and Miller-Boyett Productions | |
| Something Wilder | Sitcom | 1994–1995 | NBC | The Kellman Company | |
| Under Suspicion | Police drama | 1994–1995 | CBS | Magdalene Productions and Lakeside Productions, Inc. | |
| Babylon 5 | Space opera | 1994–1998 | PTEN/TNT | Babylonian Productions Inc. | |
| Friends | Sitcom | 1994–2004 | NBC | Bright/Kauffman/Crane Productions | |
| ER | Medical drama | 1994–2009 | NBC | Constant c Productions and Amblin Television | |
| Pointman | Action | 1995 | PTEN | Pointman Productions, Inc. | |
| The History of Rock 'n' Roll | Music | 1995 | PTEN | Andrew Solt Productions, Quincy Jones/David Salzman Entertainment, in association with Telepictures Productions, and Time-Life Video & Television | Documentary mini-series |
| Muscle | Sitcom | 1995 | The WB | Boone County Productions and Witt/Thomas Productions | |
| Medicine Ball | Medical drama | 1995 | Fox | Lakeside Productions and Crystal Beach Entertainment | |
| The Great Defender | Drama | 1995 | Fox | Schenck/Cardea Productions | |
| Charlie Grace | Crime drama | 1995 | ABC | Wings Productions and December 3 Productions | |
| The Monroes | Soap opera | 1995 | ABC | Rebel Heart Productions and Elliot Friedgen Company | |
| Double Rush | Sitcom | 1995 | CBS | Shukovsky English Entertainment | |
| The Office | Sitcom | 1995 | CBS | 5 a.m., Inc. and Witt/Thomas Productions | |
| Dweebs | Sitcom | 1995 | CBS | Peter Noah Productions | |
| New York News | Drama | 1995 | CBS | Sander/Moses Productions and Round Two Productions | |
| The Wayans Bros. | Sitcom | 1995–1999 | The WB | BabyWay Productions and Next to Last Productions | |
| The Parent 'Hood | Sitcom | 1995–1999 | The WB | Highest Common Denominator Productions (1995, season 1), The Townsend Entertainment Company (1995–1999) (seasons 2–5) and Warren & Rinsler Productions (1995–1998); (seasons 2–4) | |
| In the House | Sitcom | 1995–1999 | NBC/UPN/Syndication | Winifred Hervey Productions, Quincy Jones-David Salzman Entertainment, NBC Productions (seasons 1–2) and NBC Studios (1996–98) (seasons 3–5) | WB takes over production from season 5 onwards |
| Hope & Gloria | Sitcom | 1995–1996 | NBC | Team Steinkellner Productions | |
| High Society | Sitcom | 1995–1996 | CBS | JVTV and Look Ma Productions | |
| Bless This House | Sitcom | 1995–1996 | CBS | Mohawk Productions | |
| The Client | Legal drama | 1995–1996 | CBS | Michael Filerman Productions, Judith Paige Mitchell Productions and Regency Enterprises | Based on The Client by John Grisham |
| Minor Adjustments | Sitcom | 1995–1996 | NBC/UPN | Ken Estin Entertainment and Witt/Thomas Productions | |
| Too Something | Sitcom | 1995–1996 | Fox | | |
| Kirk | Sitcom | 1995–1996 | The WB | Bickley-Warren Productions | |
| Ace Ventura: Pet Detective | Animated | 1995–2000 | CBS/Nickelodeon | Nelvana and Morgan Creek Productions | Rights now owned by Revolution Studios |
| The Drew Carey Show | Sitcom | 1995–2004 | ABC | Mohawk Productions | |
| Mad TV | Sketch comedy | 1995–2016 | Fox/The CW | Quincy Jones-David Salzman Entertainment, Bahr/Small Productions (1995–97) (seasons 1–3); Epicenter Ventures (2016) (special; season 15), Montgomery Studios and Teitelbaum Artists (2016) (season 15) | |
| Access Hollywood | Entertainment news | 1996–2026 | Syndication | NBC Studios | WB took control of the distribution of the series in 1999 from 20th Television, WB stopped distributing Access in 2001 |
| Lush Life | Sitcom | 1996 | Fox | SisterLee Productions | |
| Party Girl | Sitcom | 1996 | Fox | Subway Productions | Based on the 1995 film |
| The Show | Sitcom | 1996 | Fox | Black Rose Productions | |
| Local Heroes | Sitcom | 1996 | Fox | No Humans Were Harmed Productions and Witt/Thomas Productions | |
| Mr. & Mrs. Smith | Crime drama | 1996 | CBS | Page Two Productions and Bakula Productions, Inc. | |
| My Guys | Sitcom | 1996 | CBS | Cherp Productions and Witt/Thomas Productions | |
| Common Law | Sitcom | 1996 | ABC | Witt/Thomas Productions | |
| Life with Roger | Sitcom | 1996–1997 | The WB | | |
| Pearl | Sitcom | 1996–1997 | CBS | Impact Zone Productions and Witt/Thomas Productions | |
| Nick Freno: Licensed Teacher | Sitcom | 1996–1998 | The WB | Warren and Rinsler Productions | |
| Suddenly Susan | Sitcom | 1996–2000 | NBC | | |
| The Jamie Foxx Show | Sitcom | 1996–2001 | The WB | Bent Outta Shape Productions and Foxxhole Productions | |
| Chicago Sons | Sitcom | 1997 | NBC | Three Sisters Entertainment and Frontier Pictures | |
| Prince Street | Cop Drama | 1997 | NBC | Writer's Workbench Films | |
| Spy Game | Action | 1997 | ABC | McNamara Paper Products, Inc., Renaissance Pictures and Universal Television | |
| Leaving L.A. | Drama | 1997 | ABC | Rebel Heart Productions | |
| The Shining | Psychological horror | 1997 | ABC | | |
| Meego | Science fiction | 1997 | CBS | Miller-Boyett-Warren Productions | |
| Built to Last | Sitcom | 1997 | NBC | Lightkeeper Productions | |
| La Femme Nikita | Action | 1997–2001 | CTV Television Network; USA Network | Baton Broadcasting, LPN Productions, Inc. and Fireworks Entertainment | Based on the 1990 film by Luc Besson |
| Veronica's Closet | Sitcom | 1997–2000 | NBC | Bright/Kauffman/Crane Productions | |
| Prey | Science fiction | 1998 | ABC | Edelson Productions and Lars Thorwald Inc. | |
| Kelly Kelly | Sitcom | 1998 | The WB | ItzBinso Long Productions and Utility Pictures | |
| Maximum Bob | Comedy drama | 1998 | ABC | Sonnenfeld Josephson Worldwide Entertainment | |
| The Brian Benben Show | Sitcom | 1998 | CBS | CBS Productions | |
| The Closer | Sitcom | 1998 | CBS | T.W.S. II Productions, Frontier Pictures and CBS Productions | |
| Vengeance Unlimited | Crime drama | 1998–1999 | ABC | McNamara Paper Products | |
| Trinity | Family drama | 1998–1999 | NBC | John Wells Productions | |
| Brimstone | Drama | 1998–1999 | Fox | Lars Thorwald Inc. | |
| Hyperion Bay | Drama | 1998–1999 | The WB | Jarndyce & Jarndyce and South Productions | |
| Two of a Kind | Sitcom | 1998–1999 | ABC | Griffard/Adler Productions, Dualstar Productions and Miller-Boyett-Warren Productions | |
| Jesse | Sitcom | 1998–2000 | NBC | Bright/Kauffman/Crane Productions | |
| For Your Love | Sitcom | 1998–2002 | NBC/The WB | SisterLee Productions | |
| Will & Grace | Sitcom | 1998–2006 | NBC | 3 Sisters Entertainment, KoMut Entertainment, NBC Studios (1998–2004), and NBC Universal Television Studio (2004–2006) | Domestic television distributor |
| Everything's Relative | Sitcom | 1999 | NBC | The Hurwitz Company, Witt/Thomas Productions and NBC Studios | |
| The Chimp Channel | Sitcom | 1999 | TBS | Telescopic Pictures | |
| Katie Joplin | Sitcom | 1999 | The WB | | |
| Crusade | Space opera | 1999 | TNT | Babylonian Productions Inc. | |
| The PJs | Black sitcom/Adult animated | 1999–2001 | Fox/The WB | Imagine Television, Touchstone Television (1999–2000) (season 1–2), The Murphy Company and Will Vinton Studios (2001) (season 3) | Season 3 only |
| Mission Hill | Animated sitcom | 1999–2002 | The WB/Cartoon Network (Adult Swim) | Castle Rock Entertainment, Film Roman and Bill Oakley/Josh Weinstein Productions | Distribution only layouts by Studio B Productions & Funbag Animation Studios with overseas work done by AKOM & New Millennium Animation |
| Odd Man Out | Sitcom | 1999–2000 | ABC | Frontier Pictures | |
| The Strip | Action | 1999–2000 | UPN | Silver Pictures Television and Millar Gough Ink | |
| The Norm Show | Sitcom | 1999–2001 | ABC | Mohawk Productions | |
| Jack & Jill | Comedy drama | 1999–2001 | The WB | The Canton Company and 22¢ Films | |
| Third Watch | Crime drama | 1999–2005 | NBC | John Wells Productions | |
| The West Wing | Political drama | 1999–2006 | NBC | John Wells Productions | |
| Freedom | Science fiction | 2000 | UPN | Silver Pictures Television and Pandaemonium Pictures Limited | |
| Opposite Sex | Comedy drama | 2000 | Fox | | |
| Bull | Drama | 2000 | TNT | Nooch Company | |
| Hype | Sketch comedy | 2000–2001 | The WB | Tollin/Robbins Productions | |
| The Fugitive | Action | 2000–2001 | CBS | Kopelson Entertainment (2000) (season 1), Kopelson Telemedia (2000–2001) (season 1) and McNamara Paper Products | Based on The Fugitive by Roy Huggins |
| Baby Blues | Animated sitcom | 2000–2002 | The WB (episodes 1–8)/Adult Swim (episodes 9–13) | King Features Syndicate, Rough Draft Studios, and Split the Difference Productions | |
| Nikki | Sitcom | 2000–2002 | The WB | Mohawk Productions | |
| X-Men: Evolution | Superhero | 2000–2003 | Kids' WB | Marvel Studios and Film Roman | International distribution only; U.S. rights owned by Disney Platform Distribution |
| Gilmore Girls | Comedy drama | 2000–2007 | The WB/The CW | Dorothy Parker Drank Here Productions and Hofflund/Polone | |
| Queer as Folk | Drama | 2000–2005 | Showtime | Tony Jonas Productions, Cowlip Productions, Temple Street Productions, Channel 4 and Showtime Networks | International distribution rights only, domestic distribution rights are with CBS Media Ventures |
| Citizen Baines | Drama | 2001 | CBS | John Wells Productions, Lydia Woodward Productions and ThinkFilm | |
| Night Visions | Horror | 2001 | Fox | Angel/Brown Productions | |
| Thieves | Drama | 2001 | ABC | Hoosier Karma and Kopelson Entertainment | |
| The Oblongs | Animated sitcom | 2001–2002 | The WB/Adult Swim | Jobsite Productions, Film Roman, Oblong Productions and Mohawk Productions with overseas work done by AKOM & Rough Draft Studios | Layouts by KMC Films, Funbag Animation Studios & Atomic Cartoons |
| Witchblade | Superhero | 2001–2002 | TNT | Camelot Pictures, Halsted Pictures, Mythic Films and Top Cow Productions | |
| The Nightmare Room | Anthology | 2001–2002 | Kids' WB | Parachute Entertainment and Tollin/Robbins Productions | |
| Off Centre | Sitcom | 2001–2002 | The WB | DreamWorks Television and Weitz, Weitz and Zuker | |
| Maybe It's Me | Sitcom | 2001–2002 | The WB | SamJen Productions and Touchstone Television | |
| Smallville | Action | 2001–2011 | The WB/The CW | Tollin/Robbins Productions, Millar Gough Ink, and DC Comics | |
| The Court | Legal drama | 2002 | ABC | John Wells Productions | |
| My Guide to Becoming a Rock Star | Comedy | 2002 | The WB | Company Pictures and Tiny Hat Productions | Based on the British series The Young Person's Guide to Becoming a Rock Star by Bryan Elsey |
| Presidio Med | Medical drama | 2002–2003 | CBS | Lydia Woodward Productions and John Wells Productions | |
| Fastlane | Action | 2002–2003 | Fox | McNamara Paper Products and Wonderland Sound and Vision | |
| Birds of Prey | Action | 2002–2003 | The WB | Tollin/Robbins Productions and Flash Film Works | |
| Good Morning, Miami | Sitcom | 2002–2003 | NBC | KoMut Entertainment | |
| The Jamie Kennedy Experiment | Reality | 2002–2004 | The WB | Bahr-Small Productions, Karz Entertainment and Big Ticket Entertainment | WB has international distribution rights, domestic distribution rights are with CBS Media Ventures |
| Everwood | Drama | 2002–2006 | The WB | Berlanti-Liddell Productions | |
| What I Like About You | Sitcom | 2002–2006 | The WB | Tollin/Robbins Productions | |
| George Lopez | Sitcom | 2002–2007 | ABC | Fortis Productions and Mohawk Productions | |
| Without a Trace | Police procedural | 2002–2009 | CBS | Jerry Bruckheimer Television, CBS Productions (2002–2006) (seasons 1–4), and CBS Paramount Network Television (2006–2009) (seasons 5–7) | |
| Wanda at Large | Sitcom | 2003 | Fox | Mohawk Productions | |
| Black Sash | Action | 2003 | The WB | The Sash Films Inc. and Tollin/Robbins Productions | |
| Skin | Drama | 2003 | Fox | Jerry Bruckheimer Television and Hoosier Karma Productions | |
| On the Spot | Comedy | 2003 | The WB | | |
| Tarzan | Adventure | 2003 | The WB | Laura Ziskin Productions and David Gerber Productions | |
| Run of the House | Sitcom | 2003–2004 | The WB | The Tannenbaum Company and 2 Out Rally Productions | |
| Like Family | Sitcom | 2003–2004 | The WB | The Littlefield Company, 3 Hounds Productions and MHS Productions | |
| All About the Andersons | Sitcom | 2003–2004 | The WB | | |
| The Mullets | Sitcom | 2003–2004 | UPN | Bill Oakley/Josh Weinstein Productions and The Tannenbaum Company | |
| I'm with Her | Sitcom | 2003–2004 | ABC | Tollin/Robbins Productions and Pennette & Henchy Productions | |
| Rock Me Baby | Sitcom | 2003–2004 | UPN | Flame Television | |
| Eve | Sitcom | 2003–2006 | UPN | The Greenblatt/Janollari Studio and Mega Diva Inc. (2004–2006) | |
| The O.C. | Teen drama | 2003–2007 | Fox | College Hill Pictures, Inc., Hypnotic (season 1) and Wonderland Sound and Vision | |
| All of Us | Sitcom | 2003–2007 | UPN/The CW | Overbrook Entertainment | |
| Nip/Tuck | Medical drama | 2003–2010 | FX | Hands Down Entertainment, Ryan Murphy Productions, Stu Segall Productions and The Shephard/Robin Company | |
| Cold Case | Crime drama | 2003–2010 | CBS | Jerry Bruckheimer Television and CBS Productions (2003–2006); CBS Paramount Network Television (2006–2009); CBS Television Studios (2009–2010) | Distributed in the U.S. by Warner Bros. Domestic Television Distribution & distributed internationally by Paramount Global Distribution Group |
| The Ellen DeGeneres Show | Talk show | 2003–2022 | Syndication | A Very Good Production and Telepictures | |
| One Tree Hill | Teen drama | 2003–2012 | The WB/The CW | Mastermind Laboratories (2008–2012) and Tollin/Robbins Productions | |
| Two and a Half Men | Sitcom | 2003–2015 | CBS | Chuck Lorre Productions and The Tannenbaum Company | |
| The Help | Sitcom | 2004 | The WB | Original Productions | |
| The D.A. | Legal drama | 2004 | ABC | The Shepard/Robin Company | |
| Come to Papa | Sitcom | 2004 | NBC | Stan Allen Productions and NBC Studios | |
| Next Action Star | Reality | 2004 | NBC | Silver Pictures Television, NBC Studios, Brass Ring Productions and GRB Entertainment | |
| The Stones | Sitcom | 2004 | CBS | KoMut Entertainment | |
| Dr. Vegas | Drama | 2004 | CBS | Bender Brown Productions | |
| Salem's Lot | Miniseries | 2004 | TNT | The Wolper Organization and Coote/Hayes Productions | |
| Jack & Bobby | Drama | 2004–2005 | The WB | Shoe Money Productions and Berlanti-Liddell Productions | |
| The Real Gilligan's Island | Reality | 2004–2005 | TBS | | |
| The Mountain | Drama | 2004–2005 | The WB | Shaun Cassidy Productions and Wonderland Sound and Vision | |
| Center of the Universe | Sitcom | 2004–2005 | CBS | Katlin/Bernstein Productions, The Tannenbaum Company and CBS Productions | |
| Blue Collar TV | Sketch comedy | 2004–2006 | The WB | Bahr/Small Productions, Parallel Entertainment & Riverside Productions, Inc. | Distribution only |
| Joey | Sitcom | 2004–2006 | NBC | Bright-San Productions and Silver & Gold Productions | |
| Veronica Mars | Drama | 2004–2019 | UPN/The CW/Hulu | Stu Segall Productions, Silver Pictures Television (seasons 1–3), Rob Thomas Productions (seasons 1–3) and Spondoodle Productions (season 4) | |
| Unscripted | Comedy drama | 2005 | HBO | HBO Entertainment and Section Eight Productions | |
| Eyes | Crime drama | 2005 | ABC | McNamara Paper Products | |
| Hot Properties | Sitcom | 2005 | ABC | SamJen Productions | |
| Reunion | Drama | 2005 | Fox | Class IV Productions and Oh That Gus!, Inc. | |
| Jonny Zero | Action | 2005 | Fox | John Wells Productions | |
| Twins | Sitcom | 2005–2006 | The WB | KoMut Entertainment | |
| Just Legal | Legal drama | 2005–2006 | The WB | Jerry Bruckheimer Television | |
| Related | Comedy drama | 2005–2006 | The WB | More Horses Productions and Class IV Productions | |
| E-Ring | Military drama | 2005–2006 | NBC | Jerry Bruckheimer Television | |
| Freddie | Sitcom | 2005–2006 | ABC | Mohawk Productions, Hunga Rican and Excitable Boy! | |
| Invasion | Science fiction | 2005–2006 | ABC | Shaun Cassidy Productions | |
| The War at Home | Sitcom | 2005–2007 | Fox | Acme Productions and Rob Lotterstein Productions | |
| Close to Home | Crime drama | 2005–2007 | CBS | Jerry Bruckheimer Television | |
| The Comeback | Sitcom | 2005–2014 | HBO | HBO Entertainment, Is or Isn't Entertainment and Working Class Films | |
| The Closer | Crime drama | 2005–2012 | TNT | The Shephard/Robin Company and Walking Entropy | |
| Supernatural | Action | 2005–2020 | The WB/The CW | Kripke Enterprises and Wonderland Sound and Vision | |
| Four Kings | Sitcom | 2006 | NBC | KoMut Entertainment | |
| Twenty Good Years | Sitcom | 2006 | NBC | Marsh McCall Productions and Werner/Gold/Miller Productions | |
| Modern Men | Sitcom | 2006 | The WB | Marsh McCall Productions and Jerry Bruckheimer Television | |
| The Bedford Diaries | Drama | 2006 | The WB | HBO Independent Productions, The Levinson/Fontana Company and Mother Trucker Television Productions Ltd. | |
| The Evidence | Crime drama | 2006 | ABC | John Wells Productions | |
| Justice | Legal drama | 2006 | Fox | Jerry Bruckheimer Television | |
| Happy Hour | Sitcom | 2006 | Fox | Double Double Bonus Entertainment and Werner/Gold/Miller Productions | |
| Smith | Drama | 2006 | CBS | John Wells Productions | |
| Men in Trees | Comedy drama | 2006–2008 | ABC | Tree Line Films (season 1) and Perkins Street Productions | |
| The New Adventures of Old Christine | Sitcom | 2006–2010 | CBS | Kari's Logo Here | |
| The Class | Sitcom | 2006–2007 | CBS | CraneKlarik | |
| Studio 60 on the Sunset Strip | Comedy drama | 2006–2007 | NBC | Shoe Money Productions | |
| The Nine | Serial | 2006–2007 | ABC | Sunset Road Productions | |
| Traveler | Drama | 2007 | ABC | The Jinks/Cohen Company | |
| Moonlight | Paranormal romance | 2007–2008 | CBS | Silver Pictures Television | |
| Big Shots | Comedy drama | 2007–2008 | ABC | Oh That Gus!, Inc. | |
| Aliens in America | Sitcom | 2007–2008 | The CW | CBS Paramount Network Television, Mr. Bigshot Fancy-Pants Productions and Guarascio/Port Productions | |
| Notes from the Underbelly | Sitcom | 2007–2008 | ABC | The Tannenbaum Company and Hill Three Productions | |
| Pushing Daisies | Comedy drama | 2007–2009 | ABC | The Jinks/Cohen Company and Living Dead Guy Productions | |
| Chuck | Action | 2007–2012 | NBC | College Hill Pictures, Inc. (2007–2010); (Seasons 1–3), Fake Empire (2010–2012); (Seasons 4–5) and Wonderland Sound and Vision | |
| Gossip Girl | Teen drama | 2007–2012 | The CW | College Hill Pictures, Inc. (seasons 1–3), Fake Empire, Alloy Entertainment and CBS Television Studios | |
| The Big Bang Theory | Sitcom | 2007–2019 | CBS | Chuck Lorre Productions | |
| Eleventh Hour | Police procedural | 2008–2009 | CBS | Jerry Bruckheimer Television and Granada America | Based on Eleventh Hour by Granada Television |
| Privileged | Comedy drama | 2008–2009 | The CW | Tsiporah and Alloy Entertainment | |
| Terminator: The Sarah Connor Chronicles | Action | 2008–2009 | Fox | Sarah Connor Pictures, Bartleby Company, C2 Pictures (season 1) and The Halcyon Company (season 2) | |
| Fringe | Science fiction | 2008–2013 | Fox | Bad Robot | |
| The Mentalist | Police procedural | 2008–2015 | CBS | Primrose Hill Productions | |
| The Life & Times of Tim | Animated sitcom | 2008–2012 | HBO | HBO Entertainment, Media Rights Capital and Insane Loon Productions | Rights held by Media Rights Capital |
| Childrens Hospital | Sitcom | 2008–2016 | TheWB.com/Adult Swim | The Corddry Company, Abominable Pictures, Warner Bros. Studio 2.0 and Williams Street | |
| The Beautiful Life | Teen drama | 2009 | The CW | Katalyst Films, CBS Productions, Mike Kelley Productions and The Page Fright Company | |
| Hank | Sitcom | 2009 | ABC/Sistema Brasileiro de Televisão | McMonkey Productions, Grammnet Productions, Werner Entertainment and Bonanza Productions | |
| The Forgotten | Crime drama | 2009–2010 | ABC | Jerry Bruckheimer Television and Bonanza Productions | |
| Eastwick | Comedy drama | 2009–2010 | ABC | Curly Girly Productions | |
| V | Science fiction | 2009–2011 | ABC | The Scott Peters Company and HDFilms | |
| Southland | Crime drama | 2009–2013 | NBC/TNT | John Wells Productions | |
| The Middle | Sitcom | 2009–2018 | ABC | Blackie and Blondie Productions | |
| The Vampire Diaries | Drama | 2009–2017 | The CW | Outerbanks Entertainment, Alloy Entertainment, CBS Television Studios and Bonanza Productions | |
| Past Life | Police procedural | 2010 | Fox | Hudgins Productions, Pitt Group and Bonanza Productions | |
| Miami Medical | Medical drama | 2010 | CBS | Jerry Bruckheimer Television, Skim Milk Productions and Bonanza Productions | |
| Romantically Challenged | Sitcom | 2010 | ABC | Candy Bar Productions and Bonanza Productions | |
| Undercovers | Action | 2010 | NBC | Bad Robot, Good Butter Productions and Bonanza Productions | |
| The Whole Truth | Drama | 2010 | ABC | Jerry Bruckheimer Television and Bonanza Productions | |
| Human Target | Action | 2010–2011 | Fox | Wonderland Sound and Vision, Bonanza Productions and DC Comics | |
| Life Unexpected | Teen drama | 2010–2011 | The CW | CBS Productions and Best Day Ever Productions and Mojo Films | |
| Hellcats | Comedy drama | 2010–2011 | The CW | Five & Dime Productions, Bonanza Productions and CBS Television Studios | |
| Chase | Police procedural | 2010–2011 | NBC | Jerry Bruckheimer Television and Bonanza Productions | |
| Better with You | Sitcom | 2010–2011 | ABC | Silver & Gold Productions and Bonanza Productions | |
| $#*! My Dad Says | Sitcom | 2010–2011 | CBS | KoMut Entertainment and Bonanza Productions | |
| Nikita | Drama | 2010–2013 | The CW | Wonderland Sound and Vision, Nikita Films and Sesfonstein Productions | Based on the 1990 film by Luc Besson |
| Mike & Molly | Sitcom | 2010–2016 | CBS | Chuck Lorre Productions and Bonanza Productions | |
| Shameless | Comedy drama | 2011–2021 | Showtime | John Wells Productions and Bonanza Productions | Based on the British series of the same name by Paul Abbott |
| The Paul Reiser Show | Sitcom | 2011 | NBC | Nuance Productions | |
| Harry's Law | Legal drama | 2011–2012 | NBC | David E. Kelley Productions and Bonanza Productions | |
| Ringer | Thriller | 2011–2012 | The CW | Green Eggs and Pam Productions, Inc., Brillstein Entertainment Partners, ABC Studios, CBS Television Studios (pilot) and CBS Productions (episodes 2–22) | |
| The Secret Circle | Supernatural | 2011–2012 | The CW | Outerbanks Entertainment, Alloy Entertainment, CBS Television Studios and Bonanza Productions | |
| I Hate My Teenage Daughter | Sitcom | 2011–2012 | Fox | Gavin&Roxie&Hap Productions and Bonanza Productions | |
| 2 Broke Girls | Sitcom | 2011–2017 | CBS | Michael Patrick King Productions and Bonanza Productions | |
| Person of Interest | Crime drama | 2011–2016 | CBS | Bad Robot, Kilter Films and Bonanza Productions | |
| Hart of Dixie | Comedy drama | 2011–2015 | The CW | Fake Empire, Dogarooski, CBS Television Studios and Bonanza Productions | |
| Suburgatory | Sitcom | 2011–2014 | ABC | Piece of Pie Productions | |
| Are You There, Chelsea? | Sitcom | 2012 | NBC | Borderline Amazing Productions, Werner Entertainment, 4 to 6 Foot Productions and Bonanza Productions | |
| Alcatraz | Science fiction | 2012 | Fox | Bad Robot and Bonanza Productions | |
| Coma | Medical thriller | 2012 | A&E | Turner Entertainment Co., Sony Pictures Television and Scott Free Productions | Based on Coma by Robin Cook and the 1978 film of the same name by Metro Goldwyn Mayer |
| Partners | Sitcom | 2012 | CBS | KoMut Entertainment | |
| Major Crimes | Crime drama | 2012–2018 | TNT | The Shephard/Robin Company and Walking Entropy | |
| Arrow | Superhero | 2012–2020 | The CW | Bonanza Productions, Berlanti Productions and DC Comics | |
| Revolution | Action | 2012–2014 | NBC | Bad Robot, Kripke Enterprises and Bonanza Productions | |
| Work It | Sitcom | 2012–2013 | ABC/TV2/MTV3 | Summer School Productions and Bonanza Productions | |
| 666 Park Avenue | Supernatural | 2012–2013 | ABC | Alloy Entertainment and Bonanza Productions | |
| Emily Owens, M.D. | Medical drama | 2012–2013 | The CW | CBS Television Studios and The Dan Jinks Company | |
| Cult | Mystery | 2013 | The CW | Fake Empire, CBS Television Studios & Rockne S. O’Bannon Television | |
| Golden Boy | Crime drama | 2013 | CBS | Berlanti Productions, Nicholas Wootton Productions & Bonanza Productions | |
| The Carrie Diaries | Teen drama | 2013–2014 | The CW | Fake Empire and A.B. Baby Productions | |
| Hostages | Drama | 2013–2014 | CBS | Jerry Bruckheimer Television and Nana.10.Co.il | Based on Bnei Aruba by Nana.10.Co |
| Super Fun Night | Sitcom | 2013–2014 | ABC | Conaco and Bonanza Productions | |
| The Tomorrow People | Science fiction | 2013–2014 | The CW | FremantleMedia North America, CBS Television Studios, Berlanti/Plec and Bonanza Productions | Based on The Tomorrow People by Thames Television |
| Almost Human | Science fiction | 2013–2014 | Fox | Frequency Films, Bad Robot and Bonanza Productions | |
| Newsreaders | Comedy | 2013–2015 | Adult Swim | The Corddry Company, Abominable Pictures, Warner Bros. Studio 2.0 and Williams Street | |
| The Following | Psychological thriller | 2013–2015 | Fox | Outerbanks Entertainment and Bonanza Productions | |
| Mom | Sitcom | 2013–2021 | CBS | Chuck Lorre Productions | |
| The Originals | Horror | 2013–2018 | The CW | My So-Called Company, Alloy Entertainment, CBS Television Studios and Bonanza Productions | |
| Reign | Historical drama | 2013–2017 | The CW | Joyful Girl Productions, Take 5 Productions, Whizbang Films and CBS Television Studios | |
| Believe | Fantasy | 2014 | NBC | Bad Robot, Esperanto Filmoj and Bonanza Productions | |
| Star-Crossed | Science fiction | 2014 | The CW | Space Floor Television, Olé Productions and CBS Television Studios | |
| Surviving Jack | Comedy | 2014 | Fox/TVNZ 2 | Doozer | |
| Selfie | Sitcom | 2014 | ABC/Hulu | Piece of Pie Productions | Modern adaptation of My Fair Lady |
| Undateable | Sitcom | 2014–2016 | NBC | Doozer | |
| Candidly Nicole | Reality | 2014–2015 | VH1 | World of Wonder, Telepictures and Honey Child Productions | |
| The Mysteries of Laura | Police procedural | 2014–2016 | NBC | Berlanti Productions, Kapital Entertainment, New Media Vision and Jeff Rake Productions | Based on Los Misterios de Laura by RTVE |
| Forever | Fantasy | 2014–2015 | ABC | Good Session Productions and Lin Pictures | |
| Stalker | Crime drama | 2014–2015 | CBS | Outerbanks Entertainment | |
| A to Z | Sitcom | 2014–2015 | NBC | BQ Productions and Le Train Train | |
| Constantine | Drama | 2014–2015 | NBC | DC Comics, Ever After Productions, Phantom Four Films and Bonanza Productions | |
| Gotham | Crime drama | 2014–2019 | Fox | Primrose Hill Productions and DC Comics | |
| The 100 | Action | 2014–2020 | The CW | Alloy Entertainment, Bonanza Productions and CBS Television Studios | |
| The Flash | Superhero | 2014–2023 | The CW | Bonanza Productions, Berlanti Productions and DC Entertainment | |
| Jane the Virgin | Comedy drama | 2014–2019 | The CW | Poppy Productions, RCTV International, Electus and CBS Television Studios | Based on Juana la Virgen by RCTV |
| The Leftovers | Drama | 2014–2017 | HBO | HBO Entertainment, White Rabbit and Film 44 | |
| iZombie | Comedy drama | 2015–2019 | The CW | Spondoolie Productions, Bonanza Productions, DC Comics and Vertigo | |
| Blindspot | Crime drama | 2015–2020 | NBC | Berlanti Productions and Quinn's House | |
| Crazy Ex-Girlfriend | Romantic comedy | 2015–2019 | The CW | LeanMachine, Webbterfuge and CBS Television Studios | |
| Supergirl | Superhero | 2015–2021 | CBS/The CW | Berlanti Productions and DC Comics | |
| Significant Mother | Sitcom | 2015 | The CW | Alloy Entertainment and CBS Television Studios | |
| The Messengers | Supernatural | 2015 | The CW | Thunder Road Television and CBS Television Studios | |
| One Big Happy | Sitcom | 2015 | NBC | Visualized, Inc. and A Very Good Production | |
| Legends of Tomorrow | Superhero | 2016–2022 | The CW | Berlanti Productions, DC Comics and Bonanza Productions | |
| Lucifer | Occult detective fiction | 2016–2021 | Fox/Netflix | Jerry Bruckheimer Television and DC Comics | |
| Animal Kingdom | Crime drama | 2016–2022 | TNT | John Wells Productions | Continued from Warner Horizon Television |
| Queen Sugar | Drama | 2016–2022 | OWN | Array Filmworks and Harpo Films | Continued from Warner Horizon Television |
| Westworld | Science fiction | 2016–2022 | HBO | HBO Entertainment, Jerry Weintraub Productions (season 1), Bad Robot and Kilter Films | Based on the 1973 film by Metro-Goldwyn-Mayer |
| Lethal Weapon | Comedy drama | 2016–2019 | Fox | Lin Pictures and Good Session Productions | Based on the 1987 film and its sequels by Warner Bros. Pictures |
| Containment | Drama | 2016 | The CW | Eyeworks and My So-Called Company | |
| 11.22.63 | Drama | 2016 | Hulu | Carpenter B. and Bad Robot | |
| Rush Hour | Police procedural | 2016 | CBS | Doozer, RatPac Television and New Line Cinema | Based on the 1998 film by New Line Cinema |
| Frequency | Drama | 2016–2017 | The CW | Jeremy Carver Productions, Lin Pictures and New Line Cinema | Based on the 2000 film by New Line Cinema |
| Roadies | Comedy drama | 2016 | Showtime | Bad Robot, Vinyl Films and Showtime Networks | |
| No Tomorrow | Comic science-fiction | 2016–2017 | The CW | Grupo Globo, Electus and CBS Television Studios | Based on Como Aproveitar o Fim do Mundo by Estúdios Globo |
| Time After Time | Drama | 2017 | ABC | Outerbanks Entertainment | |
| Powerless | Sitcom | 2017 | NBC | Ehsugadee Productions and DC Comics | |
| Training Day | Crime | 2017 | CBS | Jerry Bruckheimer Television | Based on the 2001 film by Warner Bros. Pictures |
| Me, Myself & I | Sitcom | 2017–2018 | CBS | Kapital Entertainment and Melon Entertainment | |
| Disjointed | Sitcom | 2017–2018 | Netflix | Chuck Lorre Productions | |
| Trial & Error | Mockumentary/Surreal comedy | 2017–2018 | NBC | Other Shoe Productions and Good Session Productions | |
| Riverdale | Teen drama | 2017–2023 | The CW | Berlanti Productions, CBS Studios and Archie Comics | |
| Claws | Comedy drama | 2017–2022 | TNT | Le Train Train and Studio T (seasons 1–2) | Continued from Warner Horizon Television |
| Young Sheldon | Sitcom | 2017–2024 | CBS | Chuck Lorre Productions | |
| Valor | Military drama | 2017–2018 | The CW | Ostar Productions and CBS Television Studios | |
| Black Lightning | Superhero | 2018–2021 | The CW | Berlanti Productions, Akil Productions and DC Comics | |
| Life Sentence | Drama | 2018 | The CW | In Good Company, Doozer and CBS Television Studios | |
| Deception | Crime drama | 2018 | ABC | Berlanti Productions and VHPT Company | |
| Living Biblically | Sitcom | 2018 | CBS | Enrico Pallazzo Productions and Alcide Bava Productions | |
| Splitting Up Together | Sitcom | 2018–2019 | ABC | A Very Good Production and Piece of Pie Productions | |
| Castle Rock | Mystery | 2018–2019 | Hulu | Bad Robot, Old Curiosity Shop and Darkbloom Productions (season 1) | |
| You | Psychological thriller | 2018–2025 | Lifetime/Netflix | Berlanti Productions, Man Sewing Dinosaur, Alloy Entertainment and A+E Studios | Continued from Warner Horizon Television |
| Manifest | Drama/Supernatural | 2018–2023 | NBC/Netflix | Universal Television (seasons 1–3), Compari Entertainment and Jeff Rake Productions | |
| God Friended Me | Fantasy | 2018–2020 | CBS | Berlanti Productions, I Have an Idea! Entertainment and CBS Television Studios | |
| Chilling Adventures of Sabrina | Horror | 2018–2020 | Netflix | Berlanti Productions, Muckle Man Productions (season 2) and Archie Comics | |
| All American | Sports drama | 2018–2026 | The CW | Berlanti Productions, April Blair's Company (season 1) and CBS Studios | |
| Titans | Superhero | 2018–2023 | DC Universe/HBO Max | Berlanti Productions, Weed Road Pictures (seasons 1–2) and DC Entertainment | |
| Legacies | Drama | 2018–2022 | The CW | My So-Called Company, Alloy Entertainment and CBS Studios | |
| The Kominsky Method | Sitcom | 2018–2021 | Netflix | Chuck Lorre Productions | |
| Roswell, New Mexico | Drama | 2019–2022 | The CW | Amblin Television, My So Called Company, Bender Brown Productions and CBS Studios | |
| Doom Patrol | Superhero | 2019–2023 | DC Universe/HBO Max | Berlanti Productions, Jeremy Carver Productions and DC Entertainment | |
| Whiskey Cavalier | Comedy drama | 2019 | ABC | Hemingson Entertainment and Doozer | |
| In the Dark | Crime drama | 2019–2022 | The CW | Red Hour Productions and CBS Studios | |
| The Red Line | Drama | 2019 | CBS | Forward Movement, Berlanti Productions, Array Flimworks and CBS Television Studios | |
| Special | Comedy | 2019–2021 | Netflix | Stage 13, That's Wonderful Productions and Campfire | |
| It's Bruno! | Comedy | 2019 | Netflix | Stage 13, SLI Entertainment and Phiphen Pictures | |
| What/If | Thriller | 2019 | Netflix | Page Fright, Atlas Entertainment and Compari Entertainment | |
| Swamp Thing | Superhero | 2019 | DC Universe | Big Shoe Productions, Atomic Monster and DC Entertainment | |
| Pennyworth | Action | 2019–2022 | Epix/HBO Max | Primrose Hill Productions and DC Entertainment | Also known as Pennyworth: The Origin of Batman's Butler for season 3; Continued from Warner Horizon Television; A prequel to Gotham and the DC Vertigo graphic novel V for Vendetta; Based on the DC Comics character Alfred Pennyworth by Bill Finger & Jerry Robinson |
| All Rise | Legal drama | 2019–2023 | CBS/OWN | CBS Studios (seasons 1–2), Harpo Films (season 3-) Shimmering Pictures (seasons 1–2), Skyemac Productions and Tall Baby Productions | |
| David Makes Man | Coming-of-age | 2019–2021 | OWN | Page Fright, Outlier Society Productions and Harpo Films | Continued from Warner Horizon Television |
| Bob Hearts Abishola | Sitcom | 2019–2024 | CBS | Chuck Lorre Productions | |
| Prodigal Son | Crime drama | 2019–2021 | Fox | Berlanti Productions, Sklaverwork Productions, VHPT Company and Fox Entertainment | |
| Batwoman | Superhero | 2019–2022 | The CW | Berlanti Productions and DC Entertainment | |
| Watchmen | Superhero | 2019 | HBO | HBO Entertainment, White Rabbit, Paramount Television and DC Entertainment | A television series sequel to the DC Comics comic limited series by Alan Moore and Dave Gibbons |
| Dolly Parton's Heartstrings | Anthology | 2019 | Netflix | Dixie Pixie Productions, Sandollar Productions and Magnolia Hill Entertainment | |
| AJ and the Queen | Comedy drama | 2020 | Netflix | MPK Productions and RuCo | |
| Katy Keene | Comedy drama | 2020 | The CW | Berlanti Productions, Archie Comics and CBS Studios | A spin-off to Riverdale; Based on the Archie Comics character of the same name by Katy Keene and Bill Woggon |
| Cherish the Day | Romantic drama | 2020–2022 | OWN | Harpo Films and ARRAY Filmworks | Continued from Warner Horizon Television |
| 100 Humans | Reality-TV | 2020 | Netflix | Shed Media, BlazHoffski and Rob & Joep Productions | |
| Self Made: Inspired by the Life of Madam C.J. Walker | Drama | 2020 | Netflix | SpringHill Entertainment, Orit Entertainment and Wonder Street | |
| Stargirl | Superhero | 2020–2022 | DC Universe/The CW | Berlanti Productions, Mad Ghost Productions and DC Entertainment | |
| I May Destroy You | Drama | 2020 | BBC One; HBO | FALKNA Productions, Various Artists Limited and BBC Studios | |
| Little Voice | Romantic comedy | 2020 | Apple TV+ | Dear Hope Productions and Bad Robot | |
| The Fugitive | Action thriller | 2020 | Quibi | Blackjack Films, Thunder Road Pictures and 3 Arts Entertainment | |
| Ted Lasso | Comedy drama | 2020–present | Apple TV+ | Ruby's Tuna, Doozer and Universal Television | |
| Lovecraft Country | Period drama | 2020 | HBO | HBO Entertainment, Afemme, Monkeypaw Productions and Bad Robot | |
| B Positive | Sitcom | 2020–2022 | CBS | Chuck Lorre Productions | |
| The Flight Attendant | Thriller | 2020–2022 | HBO Max | Yes, Norman Productions and Berlanti Productions | |
| The Right Stuff | Historical drama | 2020 | Disney+ | National Geographic Studios and Appian Way Productions | |
| Call Me Kat | Sitcom | 2021–2023 | Fox | Farm Kid, Sad Clown Productions, That's Wonderful Productions, Fox Entertainment, and BBC Studios | Based on Miranda by BBC Studios |
| Superman & Lois | Superhero drama | 2021–2024 | The CW | Berlanti Productions and DC Entertainment | |
| United States of Al | Sitcom | 2021–2022 | CBS | Chuck Lorre Productions | |
| Kung Fu | Martial arts action | 2021–2023 | The CW | Berlanti Productions, Quinn's House (seasons 1–2) and Kinga Productions (season 3) | |
| Sweet Tooth | Fantasy drama | 2021–2024 | Netflix | Nightshade, Team Downey and DC Entertainment | |
| Lisey's Story | Drama | 2021 | Apple TV+ | 60/40 Productions and Bad Robot | |
| The Republic of Sarah | Drama | 2021 | The CW | Black Lamb, Fulwell 73 Productions and CBS Studios | |
| Os Exterminadores do Além: A série | Comedy | 2021 | SBT | Clube Filmes | Produced by Warner Bros. Television; Based on 2018 film produced by Warner Bros. and Clube Filmes |
| Gossip Girl | Teen drama | 2021–2023 | HBO Max | Random Acts Productions, Fake Empire, Alloy Entertainment and CBS Studios | A standalone sequel to the original series of the same name; Based on the novel series by Cecily von Ziegesar |
| Maid | Drama | 2021 | Netflix | John Wells Productions and LuckyChap Entertainment | |
| Blade Runner: Black Lotus | Anime | 2021 | Adult Swim (Toonami) | Crunchyroll and Williams Street | Licensed by Warner Bros. TV Studios and Sony Pictures Television (International) |
| Head of the Class | Sitcom | 2021 | HBO Max | Doozer | Revival of the 1986–1991 series by Michael Elias and Richard Eustis |
| The Sex Lives of College Girls | Comedy drama | 2021–2025 | HBO Max | Kaling International and 3 Arts Entertainment | |
| Abbott Elementary | Mockumentary | 2021–present | ABC | Delicious Non-Sequitur Productions, Fifth Chance (season 2–) and 20th Television | |
| The Cleaning Lady | Crime drama | 2022–2025 | Fox | ShadowDance Pictures, Amore & Vita Productions, Inc. (seasons 1–2), Laughing Monkeys (seasons 1–2) and Fox Entertainment | Based on the Argentine series La Chica Que Limpa |
| Pivoting | Comedy | 2022 | Fox | Mama Look! Productions, Kapital Entertainment and Fox Entertainment | |
| Naomi | Superhero | 2022 | The CW | Array Filmworks and DC Entertainment | |
| The Kings of Napa | Drama | 2022 | OWN | Harpo Films and Folding Chair Productions | |
| Peacemaker | Superhero action/Black comedy | 2022–2025 | HBO Max | DC Studios, The Safran Company, and Troll Court Entertainment | |
| All American: Homecoming | Sports drama | 2022–2024 | The CW | CBS Studios, Berlanti Productions and Rock My Soul Productions | |
| Shining Vale | Comedy horror | 2022–2023 | Starz | Lionsgate Television, Kapital Entertainment, Other Shoe Productions and Merman | |
| DMZ | Dystopian alternate history drama | 2022 | HBO Max | ARRAY Filmworks, Analog and DC Entertainment | |
| The Time Traveler's Wife | Science fiction romantic drama | 2022 | HBO | HBO Entertainment, New Line Cinema and Hartswood Films | |
| Keep Breathing | Survival drama | 2022 | Netflix | Wide Awake Productions and Quinn's House | |
| Pretty Little Liars: Original Sin | Slasher teen mystery thriller | 2022–2024 | HBO Max | Muckle Man Productions and Alloy Entertainment | |
| The Sandman | Fantasy drama | 2022–2025 | Netflix | DC Entertainment, PurePop Inc., The Blank Corporation and Phantom Four Films | |
| East New York | Police procedural | 2022–2023 | CBS | Clothesline Productions, Grounded Mind, Skyemac Productions and Wonder Street Entertainment | |
| The Winchesters | Supernatural drama | 2022–2023 | The CW | CBS Studios, Here There, Chaos Machine Productions and Wonderland Sound and Vision | Prequel of Supernatural |
| The Peripheral | Science fiction thriller drama | 2022 | Amazon Prime Video | Kilter Films, Copperheart Entertainment and Amazon Studios | |
| Night Court | Sitcom | 2023–2025 | NBC | After January Productions, Secret Bird and Universal Television | Revival of the 1984–1992 series |
| Shrinking | Comedy | 2023–present | Apple TV+ | 3 Chance Productions, Corporate Mandate and Doozer Productions | |
| Gotham Knights | Action crime drama superhero | 2023 | The CW | Berlanti Productions and DC Entertainment | |
| Mrs. Davis | Science fiction drama | 2023 | Peacock | White Rabbit Productions and Little Bug | |
| Casa Grande | Family drama | 2023 | Amazon Freevee | ESX Entertainment | |
| Found | Drama | 2023–2025 | NBC | Berlanti Productions, Rock My Soul Productions and Universal Television | Originally ordered at ABC |
| Bookie | Comedy | 2023–2025 | HBO Max | Chuck Lorre Productions | Originally titled 'How to Be a Bookie' |
| The Girls on the Bus | Political drama | 2024 | HBO Max | Berlanti Productions and Tsiporah | Originally ordered by Netflix and later developed at The CW |
| Dead Boy Detectives | Supernatural comedy-drama | 2024 | Netflix | DC Entertainment, Berlanti Productions and Ghost Octopus | Originally in development at Max |
| The Big Cigar | Drama | 2024 | Apple TV+ | Epic, Jim Hecht Productions and Folding Chair Productions | 6-episode series |
| How Music Got Free | Music | 2024 | Paramount+ | Telepictures, MTV Entertainment Studios, SpringHill Company, Interscope Films and Shady Films | |
| Presumed Innocent | Legal drama | 2024–present | Apple TV+ | Bad Robot, Nine Stories Productions, Old Curiosity Shop Productions and David E. Kelley Productions | |
| The Emperor of Ocean Park | Thriller | 2024 | MGM+ | John Wells Productions | |
| Bad Monkey | Crime comedy | 2024–present | Apple TV+ | Doozer Productions | |
| The Penguin | Crime drama gangster miniseries | 2024 | HBO | DC Studios, Acid and Tender Productions, 6th & Idaho Motion Picture Company, Dylan Clark Productions, Chapel Place Productions and Zobot Projects | Originally ordered at Max |
| Rescue: HI-Surf | Drama | 2024–2025 | Fox | John Wells Productions and Fox Entertainment | |
| Brilliant Minds | Medical drama | 2024–2026 | NBC | Berlanti Productions, 1107 Productions, 72nd Street Fabel Entertainment, The Imaginarium and Universal Television | Originally ordered at Fox |
| Georgie & Mandy's First Marriage | Sitcom | 2024–present | CBS | Chuck Lorre Productions | A direct sequel to Young Sheldon |
| The Pitt | Medical drama | 2025–present | HBO Max | John Wells Productions and R. Scott Gemmill Productions | |
| Running Point | Sports Comedy | 2025–present | Netflix | Kaling International, 23/34 Productions and 3 Arts Entertainment | |
| Duster | Crime Thriller | 2025 | HBO Max | Bad Robot and TinkerToy Productions | |
| Untamed | Murder Mystery | 2025–present | Netflix | John Wells Productions, Escape Artists and Bee Holder Productions | |
| Leanne | Sitcom | 2025–present | Netflix | Chuck Lorre Productions | |
| It: Welcome to Derry | Coming-of-age supernatural horror | 2025–present | HBO | Rideback, Vertigo Entertainment, FiveTen Productions, K Plus Ultra and Double Dream | A prequel to the 2017 film It and its 2019 sequel It Chapter Two; Based on the novel It by Stephen King |
| Not Suitable for Work | Comedy | 2026 | Hulu | Kaling International, Charlie Grandy Productions, Inc. and 3 Arts Entertainment | |
| Memory of a Killer | Crime drama | 2026–present | Fox | Fox Entertainment | |
| Rooster | Comedy | 2026–present | HBO | Doozer Productions and Two Soups Productions | |
| Stuart Fails to Save the Universe | Sitcom | 2026–present | HBO Max | Chuck Lorre Productions | Second spin-off to The Big Bang Theory |
| Lanterns | Superhero science fiction | 2026–present | HBO | DC Studios and Man, Woman & Child Productions | Based on the DC Green Lantern characters Hal Jordan and John Stewart from DC |
| Unaccustomed Earth | Romantic drama | 2026–present | Netflix | John Wells Productions | |
| Harry Potter | Fantasy drama | December 25, 2026 | HBO | Heyday Films and Brontë Film and Television | A television adaptation of the J.K. Rowling's eponymous fantasy books series Harry Potter. |
| Anna O | Crime thriller | TBA | Netflix | Berlanti Productions | |
| The People v. Gorilla Grood | Mockumentary | TBA | HBO Max | DC Studios and Woodhead Entertainment | |
| Escorted | Romantic Comedy | TBA | Amazon Prime Video | Amazon MGM Studios | |
| Just Cause | | TBA | Amazon Prime Video | These Pictures | Based on the novel by John Katzenbach |
| Untitled Buster Keaton limited series | | TBA | TBA | 6th & Idaho Productions | |
| Doll | | TBA | NBC | | |
| Anon Pls | Drama | TBA | HBO Max | Berlanti Productions | |
| Cleopatra and Frankenstein | | TBA | HBO Max | | |
| The Hotel Nantucket | | TBA | HBO Max | | |
| The Probability of Miracles | Drama | TBA | HBO Max | Alloy Entertainment | |
| More | Drama | TBA | HBO Max | Berlanti Productions | |
| Waller | Superhero | TBA | HBO Max | DC Studios | |
| Paradise Lost | Superhero | TBA | HBO Max | DC Studios | |
| Booster Gold | Superhero | TBA | HBO Max | DC Studios | |
| 300 | | TBA | TBA | | |
| Foster Friends | | TBA | CBS | Alloy Entertainment | |
| A Few Good Men | Drama | TBA | NBC | Sony Pictures Television and Universal Television | |
| Foster Dade | | TBA | TBA | Berlanti Productions and De Line Pictures | |
| Kansas City Star | Comedy | TBA | HBO Max | Yes, Norman Productions | |
| Pure | Drama | TBA | Peacock | Weimaraner Republic Pictures | Based on Allen Salkin's Vanity Fair article "The Runaway Vegan". |
| Expecting | | TBA | Peacock | Kaling International and 3 Arts Entertainment | |
| Untitled Aqualad series | Young Adult | TBA | HBO Max | Denver & Delilah Films | Based on the 2020 YA graphic novel, You Brought Me the Ocean. |
| Pride | | TBA | HBO | Alloy Entertainment | |
| Speed Racer | | TBA | Apple TV+ | Bad Robot | |
| Stillwater | Horror | TBA | TBA | Berlanti Productions and Skybound Entertainment | |
| Untitled Justin Noble/Prime Video Project | Crime drama | TBA | Amazon Prime Video | Brownstone Productions and David E. Kelley Productions | |
| Untitled Sherlock Holmes spin-off | Mystery | TBA | HBO Max | Team Downey | |
| Untitled Sherlock Holmes spin-off (2) | Mystery | TBA | HBO Max | Team Downey | |
| Scooby-Doo: Origins | | TBA | Netflix | Berlanti Productions | |
| Untitled Sarah Chalke/Bill Lawrence project | | TBA | TBA | Doozer Productions | |
| Untitled The Conjuring Series | Supernatural horror | TBA | HBO Max | Atomic Monster and The Safran Company | |
| Afterlife with Archie | Drama | TBA | Disney+ | Berlanti Productions | |
| American Blue | Drama | TBA | HBO Max | Berlanti Productions | |
| How to Survive Without Me | Family Drama | TBA | HBO Max | Berlanti Productions and Yes, Norman Productions | |
| Modern Austen | Drama | TBA | The CW | DIGM Entertainment and Homegrown Pictures | |
| Regency | Historic Comedy | TBA | CBS | | |
| Rust Belt News | Comedy | TBA | CBS | Alloy Entertainment | |
| Skinny Dip | Crime comedy | TBA | Amazon Prime Video | Doozer Productions | |
| V for Vendetta | Drama | TBA | HBO | DC Studios, Wall to Wall Media and Poison Pen | |
| Zarna | Comedy | TBA | CBS | Kaling International, Hartbeat Productions and 3 Arts Entertainment | |
| Crazy Rich Asians | Romantic comedy drama | TBA | HBO | Color Force and SK Global Entertainment | |
| Karen Read | Drama series | TBA | Amazon Prime Video | Brownstone Productions and David E. Kelley Productions | |

==== Blue Ribbon Content ====
| Title | Years | Network | Co-production with |
|---|---|---|---|
| Terminator Salvation: The Machinima Series | 2009 | Machinima | Wonderland Sound and Vision and The Halcyon Company |
| Mortal Kombat: Legacy | 2011–2013 | Machinima | Warner Bros. Interactive Entertainment, NetherRealm Studios and Contradiction Films |
| Justice League: Gods and Monsters Chronicles | 2015 | Machinima | Warner Bros. Animation and DC Entertainment |
| Vixen | 2015–2016 | CW Seed | Warner Bros. Animation and DC Entertainment |
| Now We're Talking | 2016–2018 | go90 | Uninterrupted |
| JoJoHead | 2016 | CW Seed | Unperfect Productions |
| Ellen's Pet Dish | 2017 | YouTube | Ellen Digital Ventures |
| Ginger Snaps | 2017 | ABCd | Rubber House and BES Animation |
| Play with Caution | 2017 | DIXP | |
| Freedom Fighters: The Ray | 2017–2018 | CW Seed | Warner Bros. Animation, DC Entertainment and Berlanti Productions |
| Constantine: City of Demons | 2018–2019 | CW Seed | Warner Bros. Animation, DC Entertainment, Berlanti Productions and Phantom Four Films |
| Best Shot | 2018 | YouTube Premium | SpringHill Entertainment and Boardwalk Pictures |
| Critters: A New Binge | 2019 | Shudder | New Line Cinema and Triton Media Holdings |
| Deathstroke: Knights & Dragons | 2020 | CW Seed | Warner Bros. Animation, DC Entertainment and Berlanti Productions |
| Toys of Terror | 2020 | Syfy | Cartel Pictures |

==== Warner Horizon Television ====
| Title | Genre | Years | Network | Co-production companies |
|---|---|---|---|---|
| High School Reunion | Reality television | 2003–2010 | The WB/TV Land | Next Entertainment |
| Pussycat Dolls Present | Reality television | 2007–2008 | The CW | Pussycat LLC and 10 by 10 Entertainment |
| Online Nation | Reality television | 2007 | The CW | |
| CW Now | News program/News magazine | 2007–2008 | The CW | |
| Heartland | Medical drama | 2007 | TNT | David Hollander Productions |
| Side Order of Life | Drama | 2007 | Lifetime | The Jinks/Cohen Company |
| State of Mind | Comedy drama | 2007 | Lifetime | The Shepard/Robin Company |
| America's Best Dance Crew | Competitive dance | 2008–2015 | MTV | MTV Production Development, Tenth Planet Productions, Hip Hop International, Bayonne Entertainment and Dream Merchant Entertainment |
| Here Come the Newlyweds | Reality television | 2008–2009 | ABC | The Jay & Tony Show |
| Stylista | Reality television | 2008 | The CW | 10 by 10 Entertainment, Bankable Productions, Eliz Holzman Productions, Full Picture Entertainment, Development Hell and Magic Molehill Productions |
| Pussycat Dolls Present: Girlicious | Reality television | 2008 | The CW | 10 by 10 Entertainment, Wonderland Sound and Vision, Interscope Records, Geffen Records and Magic Molehill Productions |
| True Beauty | Reality television | 2009–2010 | ABC | Bankable Productions and Katalsyt Films |
| 13: Fear Is Real | Reality television | 2009 | The CW | Jay Beinstock Productions, Ghost House Pictures and Magic Molehill Productions |
| Trust Me | Drama | 2009 | TNT | The Shepard/Robin Company |
| Hitched or Ditched | Reality television | 2009 | The CW | |
| Man vs. Cartoon | Popular science | 2009 | TruTV | Monkey Kingdom and Pilgrim Film & Television |
| Dark Blue | Crime drama | 2009–2010 | TNT | Water Chopping Entertainment |
| More to Love | Reality television | 2009 | Fox | |
| There Goes the Neighborhood | Reality television | 2009 | CBS | Next Entertainment and Jay Bienstock Productions |
| Leave It to Lamas | Reality television | 2009 | E! | |
| Pretty Little Liars | Crime thriller | 2010–2017 | ABC Family/Freeform | Alloy Entertainment, Long Lake Productions and Russian Hill Productions |
| Rubicon | Drama | 2010 | AMC | HBTV and City Entertainment |
| Unnatural History | Action | 2010 | Cartoon Network | Mike Herb Productions |
| Memphis Beat | Crime drama | 2010–2011 | TNT | Smokehouse Productions |
| Rizzoli & Isles | Police procedural | 2010–2016 | TNT | Ostar Productions and Hurdler Productions |
| Bachelor Pad | Game show | 2010–2012 | ABC | Next Entertainment |
| School Pride | Reality television | 2010 | NBC | Denise Cramsey Productions |
| Glory Daze | Comedy drama | 2010–2011 | TBS | The Walt Becker Company |
| Shedding for the Wedding | Reality | 2011 | The CW | |
| Take the Money and Run | Reality competition | 2011 | ABC | Jerry Bruckheimer Television and Profiles Television |
| The Lying Game | Mystery | 2011–2013 | ABC Family | Alloy Entertainment and Pratt Enterprises |
| H8R | Reality | 2011 | The CW | Lisa G Productions and Next Entertainment |
| Good Vibes | Animated sitcom | 2011 | MTV | MTV Production Development, MTV Animation, Werner Entertainment, Rough House Pictures, Not the QB Pro. and Six Point Harness |
| Longmire | Crime drama | 2012–2017 | A&E/Netflix | The Shephard/Robin Company and Two Boomerangs Productions |
| Dallas | Drama | 2012–2014 | TNT | Cyntax Productions |
| Political Animals | Comedy drama | 2012 | USA Network | Berlanti Productions and Laurence Mark Productions |
| The Next: Fame Is at Your Doorstep | Reality television | 2012 | The CW | Raqual Productions and Flavor Unit Entertainment |
| Pretty Dirty Secrets | Mystery | 2012 | ABC Family | Alloy Entertainment, Long Lake Productions and Russian Hill Productions |
| Sullivan & Son | Sitcom | 2012–2014 | TBS | Wild West Picture Show Productions |
| Oh Sit! | Game show | 2012–2013 | The CW | The Gurin Company, 405 Productions and Raquel Productions Inc. |
| La Voz Kids | Reality competition | 2013–2016 | NBC | One Three Media (2013–2014), United Artists Media Group (2014–2015), MGM Television (2016) and Talpa Media |
| Ravenswood | Teen drama | 2013–2014 | ABC Family | Alloy Entertainment, Long Lake Productions, Russian Hill Productions and Jarndyce & Jarndyce Inc. |
| Ground Floor | Sitcom | 2013–2015 | TBS | Doozer |
| Copycat | Game show | 2014 | MTV | Next Entertainment and MTV Production Development |
| Finding Carter | Teen drama | 2014–2015 | MTV | The Popfilms Movie Company, Stockton Drive, Inc. (season 2) and MTV Production Development |
| Repeat After Me | Comedy reality | 2015 | ABC | A Very Good Production |
| 500 Questions | Game show | 2015–2016 | ABC | United Artists Media Group (season 1)/MGM Television (season 2) |
| Clipped | Sitcom | 2015 | TBS | KoMut Entertainment |
| Bachelor in Paradise: After Paradise | Talk show | 2015–2016 | ABC | Next Entertainment and Embassy Row |
| Fuller House | Sitcom | 2016–2020 | Netflix | Jeff Franklin Productions and Miller-Boyett Productions |
| Little Big Shots | Talent show | 2016–2020 | NBC | East 112th Street Productions, On the Day Productions and A Very Good Production |
| Ben & Lauren: Happily Ever After? | Reality Television | 2016 | Freeform | Next Entertainment |
| People of Earth | Comedy | 2016–2018 | TBS | Conaco and Deedle-Dee Productions |
| The Twins: Happily Ever After? | Reality television | 2017 | Freeform | Next Entertainment |
| Famous in Love | Drama | 2017–2018 | Freeform | Long Lake Media, Farah Films and Carmina Productions |
| Love Connection | Dating game show | 2017–2018 | Fox | Next Entertainment and Telepictures |
| The Bachelor Winter Games | Reality competition | 2018 | ABC | Next Entertainment |
| Krypton | Action | 2018–2019 | Syfy | Phantom Four Films and DC Entertainment |
| American Woman | Comedy | 2018 | Paramount Network | John Wells Productions |
| The Proposal | Reality series | 2018 | ABC | Next Entertainment |
| Love Is | Comedy drama | 2018 | Oprah Winfrey Network | Harpo Films and Akil Productions |
| La Voz | Reality competition | 2019–2020 | Telemundo | Telemundo Studios, Talpa Media (2019) and ITV America (2020) |
| The World's Best | Reality | 2019 | CBS | Fulwell 73 Productions and MGM Television |
| Pretty Little Liars: The Perfectionists | Crime thriller | 2019 | Freeform | Alloy Entertainment and Long Lake Productions |
| Million Dollar Mile | Game show | 2019 | CBS | Fly on the Wall Entertainment and SpringHill Entertainment |
| Medical Police | Comedy | 2020 | Netflix | Abominable Pictures, David Wain Productions, Mister Krister and The Corddry Company |
| The Bachelor: Listen to Your Heart | Dating game show | 2020 | ABC | Next Entertainment |
| The Bachelor: The Greatest Seasons- Ever! | Reality television | 2020 | ABC | Next Entertainment |
| Helter Skelter: An American Myth | Miniseries | 2020 | Epix | Invented By Girls, Rogue Atlas, Berlanti Productions and MGM Television |

==== Warner Horizon Unscripted Television ====
| Title | Genre | Years | Network | Co-production with |
|---|---|---|---|---|
| Whose Line Is It Anyway? | Comedy | 1998–2024 | ABC/ABC Family/The CW | Hat Trick Productions and Angst Productions |
| The Bachelor | Dating game show | 2002–present | ABC | Next Entertainment (2002–2023) and NZK Productions Inc. |
| The Bachelorette | Dating game show | 2003–present | ABC | Next Entertainment (2002–2023) and NZK Productions Inc. |
| The Voice | Reality competition | 2011–present | NBC | Mark Burnett Productions (2011), One Three Media (2012–2014), United Artists Media Group (2014–2015), MGM Television (2016–present), Talpa Media (2011–2019) and ITV America (2020–present) |
| Bachelor in Paradise | Reality competition | 2014–present | ABC | Next Entertainment (2014–2023) |
| Ellen's Game of Games | Game show | 2017–2021 | NBC | Telepictures and A Very Good Production |
| Mental Samurai | Game show | 2019–2021 | Fox | A. Smith & Co. Productions and Apploff Entertainment |
| The Bradshaw Bunch | Reality television | 2020–2022 | E! | Shed Media |
| Equal | Docuseries | 2020 | HBO Max | Scout Productions, Berlanti Productions, Raintree Ventures and That's Wonderful Productions |
| The Masked Dancer | Reality competition | 2020–2021 | Fox | Fox Alternative Entertainment, MBC and A Very Good Production |
| Family Game Fight! | Game show | 2021–2022 | NBC | A Very Good Production, Dingus Von Pringus and Telepictures |
| Home Sweet Home | Reality | 2021 | NBC/Peacock | ARRAY Filmworks |
| Harry Potter: Hogwarts Tournament of Houses | Game show | 2021 | TBS; Cartoon Network | theoldschool |
| Finding Magic Mike | Reality | 2021 | HBO Max | Eureka Productions |
| True Story with Ed and Randall | Docuseries | 2022 | Peacock | Universal Television Alternative Studio and Pacific Electric Picture Co. |
| The Wheel | Game show | 2022 | NBC | Apploff Entertainment and Hungry Bear Media |
| 100 Years of Warner Bros. | Documentary | 2023 | Max | Iwerks and Co. |
| Lotería Loca | Game show | 2023 | CBS | Apploff Entertainment |
| Harry Potter: Wizards of Baking | Baking | 2024–present | Food Network | Twenty Twenty Television and theoldschool |
| Fast Friends | Game show | 2024 | Max | |

==== Shed Media ====
| Title | Genre | Years | Network | Co-production with | Notes |
|---|---|---|---|---|---|
| Supernanny | Reality | 2005–2020 | ABC/Lifetime | | |
| Supernanny Brazil | Reality | 2006–2014 | SBT | | |
| The Real Housewives of New York City | Reality television | 2008–present | Bravo | Bravo Media Productions | Owned by NBCUniversal Global Distribution |
| Who Do You Think You Are? | Documentary | 2010–2022 | NBC/TLC | Is or Isn't Entertainment | |
| Basketball Wives | Reality | 2010–2025 | VH1 | MTV Entertainment Studios and Truly Original (season 10-) | Owned by Paramount Global Content Distribution |
| The Marriage Ref | Reality | 2010–2011 | NBC | Columbus 81 Productions and Ellen Rakieten Entertainment | |
| Bethenny Ever After | Documentary | 2010–2012 | Bravo | Bravo Media Productions | |
| Football Wives | Reality television | 2010 | VH1 | | Spin-off of Basketball Wives; Owned by Paramount Global Content Distribution |
| America's Supernanny | Documentary | 2011–2013 | Lifetime | | |
| Texas Multi Mamas | | 2011–2012 | We TV | | |
| Styled to Rock | Reality competition | 2013 | Bravo | Fenty Films, Overbrook Entertainment and Marcy Media | |
| APB: With Troy Dunn | | 2014 | TNT | | |
| Livin' Lozada | Reality | 2015–2016 | OWN | | |
| First Dates | Reality | 2017 | NBC | A Very Good Production | |
| Baller Wives | Reality | 2017 | VH1 | | |
| Polícia 24h | Reality television | 2017–present | BAND/A&E | | |
| Criminal Confessions | True crime | 2017–2020 | Oxygen | Wolf Entertainment | |
| Do or Dare | | 2017–2018 | Facebook Watch | Matador Content and SpringHill Entertainment | |
| Genius Junior | Game show | 2018 | NBC | Prediction Productions | |
| Warriors of Liberty City | | 2018 | Starz | SpringHill Entertainment and Dukes Up | |
| Mexican Dynasties | Reality television | 2019–present | Bravo | Campanario Entertainment | |
| Murder for Hire | True crime | 2019–2020 | Oxygen | Wolf Entertainment and Green Lakes Productions | |
| Best Room Wins | Reality | 2019 | Bravo | Wall to Wall Media and Bravo Media Productions | |
| 100 Humans | Reality | 2020 | Netflix | Warner Bros. Television, BlazHoffski and Rob & Joep Productions | |
| The Bradshaw Bunch | Reality | 2020–2022 | E! | Warner Horizon Unscripted Television | |
| The Real Housewives of Salt Lake City | Reality | 2020–present | Bravo | Bravo Media Productions and Invent TV | |
| Fast Foodies | Reality | 2021–present | TruTV | | |
| The Real Housewives Ultimate Girls Trip | Reality | 2021–present | Peacock | Bravo Media Productions | |
| Paris in Love | Reality | 2021–present | Peacock | Slivington Manor Entertainment and Telepictures | |
| 911 Crisis Center | Reality | 2021–present | Oxygen | | |
| Mathis Family Matters | Reality | 2022–present | E! | E! Entertainment Television, Telepictures and Cube Five Productions | |
| 101 Places to Party Before You Die | Reality | 2022–present | TruTV | High & Mighty Productions, Clone Wolf, Inc., 3 Arts Entertainment and Artists First | |

==== Telepictures ====
| Title | Genre | Years | Network | Notes |
|---|---|---|---|---|
| My Favorite Martian | Science fiction | 1963–1966 | CBS | distribution only; currently distributed by the Peter Rodgers Organization |
| Here's Lucy | Sitcom | 1968–1974 | CBS | distribution only; currently owned by Desilu Too, LLC. |
| Mayberry R.F.D. | Sitcom | 1968–1971 | CBS | distribution only |
| The New Dick Van Dyke Show | Sitcom | 1971–1974 | CBS | distribution only |
| This Old House | Home improvement | 1979–present | PBS | distribution for syndication from 1996 to 1999 produced by WGBH Educational Foundation (1979–2019), WETA-TV (2019–present) and This Old House Ventures |
| The People's Court | Reality court show | 1981–1993; 1997–2023 | Syndication | |
| Love Connection | Dating game show | 1983–1994; 1998–1999; 2017–2018 | Syndication/Fox | co-production with Eric Lieber Productions (1983–1994), PEL Productions (1998–1999), Warner Horizon Television and Next Entertainment (2017–2018) |
| Rituals | Soap opera | 1984–1985 | Syndication | co-production with Metromedia |
| The All New Let's Make a Deal | Comedy | 1984–1986 | Syndication | currently owned by Fremantle |
| Catchphrase | Game show | 1985–1986 | Syndication | co-production Pasetta Productions |
| ThunderCats | Action/Adventure | 1985–1986 | Syndication | co-production with Rankin/Bass Animated Entertainment |
| Showtime at the Apollo | Variety show | 1987–2008 | Syndication | |
| Trump Card | Game show | 1990–1991 | Syndication | co-production with Createl Ltd. and Fiedler/Berlin Productions |
| Fox's Fun House | Game show | 1990–1991 | Fox | co-production with Stone Stanley Productions |
| The Jesse Jackson Show | Talk show | 1991 | Syndication | co-production with Quincy Jones Entertainment |
| Best of the Worst | Comedy | 1991–1992 | Fox | co-production with The Wolper Organization and Lorimar Television |
| The Jenny Jones Show | Tabloid talk show | 1991–2003 | Syndication | co-production with David Salzman Enterprises and Quincy Jones-David Salzman Entertainment |
| The Jane Whitney Show | Tabloid talk show | 1992–1994 | Syndication/NBC | co-production with Scripps Howard Productions |
| Extra | Entertainment news magazine | 1994–present | Syndication | co-production with Lisa G. Productions |
| The Rosie O'Donnell Show | Variety talk show | 1996–2002 | Syndication | not to be confused with The Rosie Show on OWN. Co-production with KidRo Productions |
| In Person with Maureen O'Boyle | Talk show | 1996–1997 | Syndication | |
| Change of Heart | Reality Television | 1998–2003 | Syndication | |
| The Queen Latifah Show | Talk show | 1999–2001 | Syndication | |
| Judge Mathis | Arbitration-based reality court show | 1999–2023 | Syndication | co-production with AND Syndicated Productions and Black Pearl Entertainment |
| Street Smarts | Game show | 2000–2005 | Syndication | co-production with AND Syndicated Productions and Entertain the Brutes (seasons 1–3) |
| ElimiDate | Reality Television | 2001–2006 | Syndication | co-production with AND Syndicated Productions |
| Spend It Fast | | 2002 | Syndication | |
| The Caroline Rhea Show | Talk show | 2002–2003 | Syndication | Travail D'Amour Productions Inc. |
| Celebrity Justice | News show/nontraditional court show | 2002–2005 | Syndication | Harvey Levin Productions |
| Are You Hot? | Reality | 2003 | ABC | co-production with AND Syndicated Productions and Next Entertainment |
| The Sharon Osbourne Show | Talk show | 2003–2004 | Syndication | co-production with AND Syndicated Productions and SO Divine Productions |
| The Ellen DeGeneres Show | Talk show | 2003–2022 | Syndication | A Very Good Production and Warner Bros. Television |
| The Larry Elder Show | Talk show | 2004–2005 | Syndication | ANE Productions |
| The Tyra Banks Show | Talk show | 2005–2010 | Syndication/The CW | co-production with Bankable Productions and Handprint Entertainment (season 1) |
| The Dr. Keith Ablow Show | Talk show | 2006–2007 | Syndication | co-production with Dr. Keith Ablow Creative and LMNO Cable Group |
| TMZ on TV | Entertainment and gossip news television show | 2007–present | Syndication | co-production with Harvey Levin Productions and ParaMedia; producer of pre-2021 episodes only |
| The Bonnie Hunt Show | Talk show | 2008–2010 | Syndication | co-production with Bob & Alice Productions and ParaMedia |
| Judge Jeanine Pirro | Court show | 2008–2011 | The CW/Syndication | |
| Lopez Tonight | Talk show | 2009–2011 | TBS | co-production with Warner Horizon Television, 2.2 Productions, Paramort Television and ParaMedia |
| Dr. Drew's Lifechangers | Talk show | 2011–2012 | The CW | co-production with Dr. Drew Productions and Lisa G. Productions |
| Anderson Live | Talk show | 2011–2013 | Syndication | co-production with Strongchild Productions |
| Bethenny | Talk show | 2012–2014 | Syndication | co-production with A Very Good Production |
| Let's Ask America | Game show | 2012–2015 | Syndication | co-production with Canter/Karask Industries, Paramedia, Apploff Entertainment and E.W. Scripps Company |
| The Real | Talk show | 2013–2022 | Syndication | co-production with 495 Productions (2013–2016) |
| Just Keke | Talk show | 2014 | BET | co-production with Mantis Productions |
| Candidly Nicole | Reality | 2014–2015 | VH1 | co-production with Warner Bros. Television, World of Wonder and Honey Child Productions |
| Ellen's Design Challenge | Reality competition | 2015–2016 | HGTV | co-production with A Very Good Production and A. Smith & Co. Productions |
| Crime Watch Daily | Investigative newsmagazine | 2015–2018 | Syndication | co-production with Lisa G. Productions |
| Mad TV | Sketch comedy | 2016 | The CW | co-production with Montgomery Studios and Teitelbaum Artists |
| Ellen's Game of Games | Game show | 2017–2021 | NBC | co-production with Warner Horizon Unscripted Television and A Very Good Production |
| RuPaul | Talk show | 2019 | Syndication | co-production with World of Wonder and Warner Bros. Television |
| Ellen's Greatest Night of Giveaways | Miniseries | 2019 | Syndication | co-production with A Very Good Production |
| Family Game Fight! | Game show | 2021–2022 | NBC | co-production with Warner Horizon Unscripted Television, A Very Good Production and Dingus Von Pringus |
| Paris in Love | Reality | 2021–2022 | Peacock | co-production with Shed Media and Silvington Manor Entertainment |
| Mathis Family Matters | Reality | 2022–present | E! | co-production Shed Media, E! Entertainment Television and Cube Five Productions |
| The Jennifer Hudson Show | Talk show | 2022–present | Syndication | co-production with Warner Bros. Television and JHud Productions |
| How Music Got Free | Music | 2024 | Paramount+ | co-production with Warner Bros. Television, MTV Entertainment Studios, SpringHill Company, Interscope Films and Shady Films |

==== Cartoon Network Studios ====
===== Cartoon Network Productions =====
| Show | Year(s) | Network | Co-production(s) | Notes |
|---|---|---|---|---|
| Captain Planet and the Planeteers | 1990–1996 | TBS | DIC Entertainment, Turner Program Services (seasons 1–3) and Hanna-Barbera (seasons 4–6) | Administration only |
| The Moxy Show | 1993–1995 | Cartoon Network | Colossal Pictures | |
| Cartoon Planet | 1995–1998; 2012–2014 | Cartoon Network | Ghost Planet Industries (1995–1997) and Turner Studios | A spin-off of Space Ghost Coast to Coast. |
| The Tex Avery Show | 1996–2002 | Cartoon Network | | |
| Ed, Edd n Eddy | 1999–2009 | Cartoon Network | A.k.a. Cartoon | |
| Cult Toons | 1999–2000 | Cartoon Network UK | Cartoon Network Europe and Exceeda | |
| Mike, Lu & Og | 1999–2001 | Cartoon Network | Kinofilm | |
| Courage the Cowardly Dog | 1999–2002 | Cartoon Network | Stretch Films | |
| Sheep in the Big City | 2000–2002 | Cartoon Network | Curious Pictures | |
| Codename: Kids Next Door | 2002–2008 | Cartoon Network | Curious Pictures | |
| Immortal Grand Prix | 2003–2006 | Adult Swim (Toonami) | Production I.G. and Bandai Entertainment | |
| Sunday Pants | 2005 | Cartoon Network | Spitfire Studios | |
| Powerpuff Girls Z | 2006–2007 | TV Tokyo; Cartoon Network Japan | Toei Animation, Aniplex and Ocean Productions | Distributed by Sony Pictures Television |
| Skatoony | 2006–2013 | Cartoon Network UK; Teletoon | Cartoon Network Europe; Talent TV (UK); MarbleMedia (NA); Blink Studios UAE | Rights owned by Blue Ant Rights |
| My Spy Family | 2007–2010 | Boomerang UK | Kindle Entertainment | |
| The Secret Saturdays | 2008–2010 | Cartoon Network | PorchLight Entertainment | |
| The Othersiders | 2009 | Cartoon Network | | |
| BrainRush | 2009 | Cartoon Network | | |
| Destroy Build Destroy | 2009–2011 | Cartoon Network | Mess Media and Idiot Box Productions | |
| Dude, What Would Happen | 2009–2011 | Cartoon Network | Dalaklis Media Enterprises | |
| Bobb'e Says | 2009 | Cartoon Network | | |
| Hero: 108 | 2010–2012 | Cartoon Network | MoonScoop Entertainment, Gamania, Telegael and Hong Ying Animation | |
| La CQ | 2012–2014 | Cartoon Network Latin America | Televisa and RCTV Studios | |
| Exchange Student Zero | 2015 | Cartoon Network Australia | Fragrant Gumtree Entertainment and Cartoon Network Southeast Asia Pacific | |
| The Happos Family | 2016–2018 | Boomerang UK/Cartoonito | Spider Eye Productions, Cyber Group Studios (uncredited) and Ferrero SpA (uncredited) | |
| Villainous | 2017–2021 | Cartoon Network Latin America | Cartoon Network Productions Mexico and A.I Animation Studio | |
| Ninjin | 2019–2021 | Cartoon Network Latin America | Birdo Studio and Pocket Trap | |
| Monster Beach | 2020 | Cartoon Network Australia | Bogan Entertainment Solutions and Fragrant Gumtree Entertainment | |

=== Warner Bros. International Television Production ===
| Title | Genre | Years | Network | Notes |
|---|---|---|---|---|
| The New Adventures of Robin Hood | Adventure | 1997–1998 | TNT/Syndication | co-production with Tarnview Limited, Dune Productions, M6, Weintraub/Kuhn Productions and Baltic Ventures International |
| Treasure Island | Reality competition | 1997–present | TVNZ 2 | continued from Eyeworks Touchdown |
| The Legend of Calamity Jane | Animation | 1997–1998 | Canal+ The WB (Kids' WB) | co-production with Gangster Production and Contre Allée |
| The New Adventures of Zorro | Animation | 1997–1998 | Syndication | co-production with Zorro Productions, Inc., Carrington Productions International, Harvest Entertainment and Fred Wolf Films Dublin |
| Police Academy: The Series | Sitcom | 1997–1998 | Syndication | co-production with Paul Maslansky Productions, Goodman/Rosen Productions and Protocol Entertainment |
| The Fantastic Voyages of Sinbad the Sailor | Animation | 1998 | Cartoon Network | co-production with WW Productions, Ventureworld Films, Carrington Productions International and Fred Wolf Films Dublin |
| Code Name: Eternity | Science fiction | 2000 | Global Television Network/M6 | co-production with Dune Productions, Protocol Entertainment and UFA International Film & TV Production |
| Dark Realm | Anthology | 2001 | Syndication | co-production with Dune Productions, Atlantique Productions and UFA International Film & TV Production |
| Who Do You Think You Are? Australia | Documentary | 2008–present | SBS | co-production with Artemis Media (seasons 1–7) |
| The Block NZ | Reality | 2012–2022 | Three | |
| Gabriela | Telenovela | 2012 | TV Globo | co-production with Estúdios Globo |
| Food Unwrapped | Consumer | 2012–2025 | Channel 4 | co-production with Ricochet |
| Territory Cops | Factual television | 2012–present | Crime & Investigation Network/Network 10 | co-production with McAvoy Media |
| The Bachelor Australia | Reality | 2013–2023 | Network 10 | co-production with Shine Australia (seasons 1–3) |
| Jills veranda | Documentary | 2014–2020 | SVT1 | |
| The Bachelor New Zealand | Dating-based competition show | 2015–2023 | Three/TVNZ 2 | |
| The Bachelorette Australia | Reality | 2015–2023 | Network 10 | co-production with Shine Australia (season 1) |
| First Dates Australia | Reality | 2016–2022 | Seven Network/Network 10 | |
| You Are Wanted | Drama | 2017–2018 | Amazon Prime Video | co-production with Pantaleon Films |
| Little Big Shots Australia | Reality | 2017–2018 | Seven Network | |
| Married at First Sight NZ | Reality | 2017–2019 | Three | |
| Bachelor in Paradise Australia | Reality | 2018–2020 | Network 10 | |
| All or Nothing: New Zealand All Blacks | Reality | 2018 | Amazon Prime Video | co-production with Mother Media Group and Pang |
| Game of Games | Game show | 2018 | Network 10 | |
| The Great Kiwi Bake Off | Baking | 2018–present | TVNZ 2/TVNZ 1 | |
| Dancing with the Stars | Reality | 2019–present | Network 10/Seven Network | Prior seasons produced by other companies. Co-production with BBC Studios |
| Brigada Costa del Sol | Serial drama | 2019 | Telecinco | co-production with Mediaset España |
| The Masked Singer Australia | Reality television | 2019–2023 | Network 10 | |
| Man in Room 301 | Drama | 2019 | Elisa Viihde | co-production with Wall to Wall Media and Inkas Film & T.V. Productions |
| Black Hands | Drama | 2020 | TVNZ 1 | |
| Pray, Obey, Kill | Docuseries | 2021 | HBO | co-production with HBO Entertainment, HBO Documentary Films and HBO Europe |
| RuPaul's Drag Race Down Under | Reality competition | 2021–present | Stan; TVNZ 2 | co-production with World of Wonder |
| The Masked Singer NZ | Reality competition | 2021–present | Three | |
| The Celebrity Apprentice Australia | Reality | 2021–2022 | Nine Network | Prior seasons produced by FremantleMedia Australia |
| Snackmasters Australia | Food | 2021–2022 | Nine Network | |
| Love Me | Drama | 2021 | Foxtel | co-production with Aquarius Films |
| Delphine: The Secret Princess | Docuseries | 2022 | HBO Max | |
| The Repair Shop Australia | Factual | 2022–present | Lifestyle | |
| The Twelve | Court drama | 2022–present | Fox Showcase | co-production with Easy Tiger Productions |
| FBOY Island NZ | Reality | 2022–present | TVNZ+ | |

==== Ricochet ====
| Title | Years | Network | Notes |
|---|---|---|---|
| No Going Back | 2002–2004 | Channel 4 | |
| Born to Be Different | 2003–2020 | Channel 4 | |
| FightBox | 2003 | BBC Three | |
| Risking It All | 2004 | Channel 4 | |
| Supernanny | 2004–2008 | Channel 4 | |
| How Not to Decorate | 2004–2006 | Channel 5 | |
| Flying Heavy Metal | 2005 | Discovery Channel UK | |
| It's Me or the Dog | 2005–present | Channel 4/Really; Animal Planet | |
| Extreme Dreams with Ben Fogle | 2006–2009 | BBC Two | |
| Sex in Court | 2007 | E4 | |
| Clutter Nutters | 2007 | CBBC | |
| Fat March | 2007 | ABC | |
| Breaking Into Tesco | 2008 | Channel 5 | |
| Unbreakable | 2008 | Channel 5 | |
| Mastercrafts | 2010–2014 | BBC Two/More4 | |
| World's Most Dangerous Roads | 2011–present | BBC Two/Dave | continued from Renegade Pictures |
| Food Unwrapped | 2012–present | Channel 4 | co-production with Warner Bros. International Television Production |
| Stacey Dooley Investigates | 2012–present | BBC Three | |
| Ben Fogle: New Lives in the Wild | 2013–present | Channel 5 | continued from Renegade Pictures co-production with Motion Content Group |
| Channel Patrol | 2014–2015 | BBC One | |
| Cowboy Builders and Bodge Jobs | 2015–2016 | Channel 5 | |
| Sun, Sea and Selling Houses | 2017–present | Channel 4 | |
| The Repair Shop | 2017–present | BBC Two/BBC One | |
| Celebrity 5 Go Motorbiking | 2017 | Channel 5 | co-production with Krempelwood Entertainment |
| Extreme Hair Wars | 2018 | 5Star | |
| Celebrity 5 Go Barging | 2018–2019 | Channel 5 | |
| The Bidding Room | 2020–present | BBC One | |
| Love Bites | 2020–2021 | ITV2 | |
| Jay's Yorkshire Workshop | 2021–present | BBC Two | |
| Kings of the Wood | 2022–present | Quest | co-production with Krempelwood Entertainment and Drive TV |
| Britain's Top Takeaways | 2022 | BBC Two | |
| Amazing Cleans | 2022–present | 5Star | |

==== Twenty Twenty Television ====
===== Watershed TV =====
| Title | Years | Network | Notes |
|---|---|---|---|
| Street Kid World Cup | 2014 | BBC Three | co-production with Ricochet |

==== Wall to Wall Media ====
| Title | Years | Network | Notes |
|---|---|---|---|
| A Statement of Affairs | 1993 | ITV | co-production with Carlton Television |
| Plotlands | 1997 | BBC One | |
| All Mod Cons | 1997 | BBC Two | |
| Body Story | 1998–2000 | Channel 4 Discovery Channel | |
| Sex, Chips & Rock n' Roll | 1999 | BBC One | |
| Naked Planet | 1999–2000 | Channel 4 | |
| The 1900 House | 1999–2000 | Channel 4 PBS | |
| The Wedding Planner | 2001 | Living TV | |
| One Hit Wonderland | 2002 | Discovery Channel | |
| Joe Millionaire UK | 2003–2004 | E4 | co-production with Fox UK |
| Regency House Party | 2004 | Channel 4 | |
| Who Do You Think You Are? | 2004–present | BBC Two/BBC One | |
| Not Forgotten | 2005–2009 | Channel 4 | |
| Waterloo Road | 2006–present | BBC One | continued from Shed Productions and Headstrong Pictures co-production with Rope Ladder Fiction |
| Surviving Disaster | 2009 | Paramount Network | co-production with Spike Cable Networks |
| Long Lost Family | 2011–present | ITV | |
| Italy Unpacked | 2013–2015 | BBC Two | |
| Car SOS | 2013–present | National Geographic UK | continued from Renegade Pictures |
| Child Genius | 2013–present | Channel 4 | |
| The Art of Australia | 2013 | BBC Four | co-production with Serendipity Productions |
| The Voice: Louder on Two | 2014 | BBC Two | co-production with Talpa |
| Back in Time for... | 2015–2022 | BBC Two | |
| First Peoples | 2015 | PBS | co-production with Arte France |
| Time Crashers | 2015 | Channel 4 | co-production with GroupM Entertainment |
| UK's Best Part-Time Band | 2016 | BBC Four | |
| 500 Questions | 2016 | ITV | |
| Lawless Oceans | 2017 | National Geographic | |
| Little Big Shots | 2017–2018 | ITV | |
| The Sweet Makers | 2017 | BBC Two | |
| Mysteries of the Missing | 2017 | Science Channel | |
| Dope | 2017–2019 | Netflix | |
| Rome Unpacked | 2018 | BBC Two | |
| 100 Years Younger in 10 Days | 2018 | ITV | |
| Churchill's Secret Agents: The New Recruits | 2018 | BBC Two; Netflix | |
| Nadiya's Asian Odyssey | 2018 | BBC Two | |
| The Twinstitute | 2019 | BBC Two | |
| Glow Up: Britain's Next Make-Up Star | 2019–present | BBC Three | |
| The Yorkshire Ripper Files: A Very British Crime Story | 2019 | BBC Four | |
| Best Room Wins | 2019 | Bravo | co-production with Shed Media and Bravo Media Productions |
| Nature's Strangest Mysteries: Solved | 2019 | Animal Planet | |
| Narcoworld: Dope Stories | 2019 | Netflix | |
| Man in Room 301 | 2019 | Elisa Viihde | co-production with Warner Bros. ITVP Finland and Inkas Film & T.V. Productions |
| Nadiya Bakes | 2020 | BBC Two | |
| The Shipman Files: A Very British Crime Story | 2020 | BBC Two | |
| My Family, the Holocaust and Me | 2020 | BBC One | |
| Becoming You | 2020 | Apple TV+ | |
| Alien Worlds | 2020 | Netflix | |
| Narco Wars | 2020–2022 | National Geographic | |
| 21 Day Body Turnaround with Michael Mosley | 2021 | Channel 4 | |
| Growing Up Animal | 2021 | Disney+ | co-production with National Geographic |
| Killers of the Cosmos | 2021 | Science Channel | |
| Nadiya's Fast Flavours | 2021 | BBC Two | |
| The Nilsen Files | 2022 | BBC Two | |
| Aids: The Unheared Tapes | 2022–present | BBC Two | |
| Flordelis: A Family Crime | 2022 | HBO Max | |
| Go Hard or Go Home | 2023–present | BBC Three | |
| Lucy Worsley's Victorian Murder Club | 2026 | BBC Two | |

===== Shed Productions =====
| Programme | Genre | Series | Episodes | Duration | Channel |
|---|---|---|---|---|---|
| Bad Girls | Drama | 8 | 107 | 1999–2006 | ITV1 |
| Footballers' Wives | Drama | 5 | 42 | 2002–2006 | ITV1 |
| Bombshell | Military drama | 1 | 7 | 2004 | ITV1 (Unaired in the UK) |
| Footballers' Wives Extra Time | | 2 | 32 | 2005–2006 | ITV2 |
| Footballers Wives TV | | 1 | 8 | 2005 | ITV2 |
| The Fugitives | Science fiction | 1 | 7 | 2005 | CITV |
| Waterloo Road | Drama | 10 | 200 | 2006–2015 | BBC One (2006–2015); BBC Three (2015) |
| Rock Rivals | Drama | 1 | 8 | 2008 | ITV1 |
| Hope Springs | Comedy drama | 1 | 8 | 2009 | BBC One |

==== Shed Media Scotland ====
| Title | Years | Network | Notes |
|---|---|---|---|
| Being Victor | 2010 | MTV UK (Internet); STV (Edited) | |
| Waterloo Road Reunited | 2011 | BBC Online | |
| Sugartown | 2011 | BBC One | |
| Young James Herriot | 2011 | BBC One | co-production with Koco Drama |

==== Headstrong Pictures ====
| Title | Years | Network | Notes |
|---|---|---|---|
| New Tricks | 2003–2015 | BBC One | Previously produced by Wall to Wall Media |

==== Renegade Pictures ====
| Title | Years | Network | Notes |
|---|---|---|---|
| Don't Tell the Bride | 2007–2020 | BBC Three/BBC One/Sky One/E4 | |
| Picture This | 2008 | Channel 4 | |
| Planet Mechanics | 2008 | National Geographic | |
| Extreme Bodies | 2008–2009 | Discovery Channel | |
| Little Crackers | 2010–2012 | Sky One | co-production with Blue Door Adventures, Phil Mclntyre Television, Sprout Pictures, Tiger Aspect Productions, Silver River Productions, Glassbox Productions, Avalon Television and Can Communicate |
| The Secret Life of Buildings | 2011 | Channel 4 | co-production with Christie HQ and The Open University |
| Bigger Than... | 2012 | Sky Living | |
| Drive to Buy | 2012 | ITV | |
| Street Genius | 2013–2015 | National Geographic UK | |
| 24 Hours to Go Broke | 2014 | Dave | |
| Transformation Street | 2018 | ITV | co-production with Storyvault Films |
| Our Yorkshire Farm | 2018–2021 | Channel 5 | co-production with Motion Content Group |
| City Life to Country Life | 2020 | Channel 5 | |
| Surviving the Stone Age: Adventure to the Wild | 2020 | Channel 4 | |
| Outsiders | 2021–present | Dave | co-production with That M&V Company |
| Sue Perkins' Big American Road Trip | 2022 | Channel 4 | |

==== Yalli Productions ====
| Title | Years | Network | Notes |
|---|---|---|---|
| Impractical Jokers UK | 2012–2016 | BBC Three/Channel 5 Comedy Central | |
| The Ginge, The Geordie and the Geek | 2013 | BBC Two | |
| Viral Tap | 2014 | ITV2 | |

==== Koco Drama ====
| Title | Years | Network | Notes |
|---|---|---|---|
| Young James Herriot | 2011 | BBC One | co-production with Shed Media Scotland |

==== Eyeworks ====
| Title | Years | Network | Notes |
|---|---|---|---|
| De Nationale IQ Test | 2001–2016 | Nederland 2/Nederland 1/NPO 1/RTL 4 | |
| Sterren Dansen Op Het IJs | 2006–2013 | SBS6 | |
| Wie words Tarzan? | 2006 | SBS6 | |
| So You Wanna Be a Popstar | 2007 | SBS6 | |
| Chef in Nood | 2008 | VTM | |
| CQC | 2008–2015 | BAND | as Eyeworks Cuatro Cabezas |
| NZ Smashes Guinness World Records | 2009 | TVNZ 2 | |
| Dag & Nacht: Hotel Eburon | 2010 | VTM | |
| Australia Smashes Guinness World Records | 2010 | Seven Network | as Eyeworks Australia |
| Op zoek naar Zorro | 2010–2011 | AVRO | |
| A Liga | 2010–2016 | BAND | as Eyeworks Cuatro Cabezas |
| Polícia 24h | 2010–2016 | BAND/A&E | (Season 1–6), as Eyework Cuatro Cabezas |
| 24 uur: tussen leven en dood | 2012 | RTL 4 | |
| Sterren Springen Op Zaterdag | 2012–2014 | SBS6 | |
| Celebrity Splash! | 2013 | Seven Network | as Eyeworks Australia |
| Amazing Greys | 2014 | ITV | co-production with ITV Studios |

== Paramount Pictures Corporation ==
| Title | Network | Year(s) | Co-production with | Notes | Status |
|---|---|---|---|---|---|
| The Firm | AXN | 2012 | AXN Original Production, Shaw Media, Lukas Reiter Productions and Entertainment One | | Ended |
| Knuckles | Paramount+ | 2024 | Sega Sammy Group and Original Film | | Miniseries |

=== DreamWorks Television ===
| Title | Years | Network | Notes |
|---|---|---|---|
| Champs | 1996 | ABC | with Ubu Productions |
| High Incident | 1996–1997 | ABC | with Johnson/Pavone Productions, Nothing But Net, Inc. (season 1) and Donwell Productions (season 2) |
| Majority Rules | 1996–1997 | NBC | |
| Spin City | 1996–2002 | ABC | with Ubu Productions and LotteryHill Entertainment |
| Ink | 1996–1997 | CBS | with Shukovsky English Entertainment and Addis/Wechsler Television |
| Arsenio | 1997 | ABC | with David Rosenthal Productions and Arsenio Hall Communications |
| Toonsylvania | 1998 | Fox Kids | produced by DreamWorks Television Animation |
| Invasion America | 1998 | The WB | produced by DreamWorks Television Animation |
| It's Like, You Know... | 1999–2000 | ABC | with 42 Pound Productions and EWH3 Productions |
| Freaks and Geeks | 1999–2000 | NBC | with Apatow Productions |
| The Others | 2000 | NBC | with NBC Studios and Delusional Films |
| Battery Park | 2000 | NBC | with Ubu Productions |
| The Job | 2001–2002 | ABC | with The Cloudland Company, Apostle and Touchstone Television; Rights co-owned with ABC Signature |
| Band of Brothers | 2001 | HBO | miniseries; with HBO and Playtone; Rights owned by HBO |
| Alienators: Evolution Continues | 2001–2002 | Fox Kids | with DIC Entertainment, The Montecito Picture Company, Columbia TriStar Television and Dentsu; Rights co-owned with WildBrain |
| Undeclared | 2001–2002 | Fox | with Apatow Productions |
| Off Centre | 2001–2002 | The WB | with Weitz, Weitz & Zuker and Warner Bros. Television |
| Boomtown | 2002–2003 | NBC | with Nemo Films and NBC Studios; Rights co-owned with NBCUniversal Syndication Studios (distributed outside of the U.S. by MGM Television) |
| Taken | 2002 | Sci Fi | miniseries |
| Oliver Beene | 2003–2004 | Fox | with Steven Levitan Productions, ge.wirtz Films and 20th Century Fox Television; Rights co-owned with 20th Television |
| Las Vegas | 2003–2008 | NBC | with Gary Scott Thompson Productions and NBC Studios/NBC Universal Television Studio/Universal Media Studios; Rights owned by NBCUniversal Syndication Studios (distributed outside of the U.S. by MGM Television) |
| Line of Fire | 2003–2004 | ABC | with Battle Plan Productions and Touchstone Television; Rights owned by Disney-ABC Home Entertainment and Television Distribution |
| Rescue Me | 2004–2011 | FX | with The Cloudland Company, Apostle and Sony Pictures Television |
| Father of the Pride | 2004–2005 | NBC | produced by DreamWorks Animation (current owner) |
| Into the West | 2005 | TNT | miniseries |
| Miracle Workers | 2006 | ABC | with MedMiracle Productions; Currently owned by Lionsgate Television |
| Dog Bites Man | 2006 | Comedy Central | with Comedy Central |
| On the Lot | 2007 | Fox | with Amblin Television and Mark Burnett Productions |
| Carpoolers | 2007–2008 | ABC | with T.R.O.R.T., 3 Arts Entertainment and ABC Studios; Rights owned by Disney-ABC Home Entertainment and Television Distribution |
| The Pacific | 2010 | HBO | miniseries; with HBO and Playtone; Started production in 2007, while DreamWorks Television was still operating as part of Paramount, prior to its split in late 2008; Rights owned by HBO |

=== Insurge Pictures ===
| Title | Airdate | Network | Notes |
|---|---|---|---|
| Burning Love | 2012–2013 | Yahoo! Screen/E! | co-production with Red Hour Productions, Abominable Pictures and Dancing Workfriend |

== Home Box Office, Inc. ==
| Title | Years | Network | Co-production with | |
|---|---|---|---|---|
| HBO World Championship Boxing | 1973–2018 | HBO | | |
| On Location | 1975–1986 | HBO | | |
| Inside the NFL | 1977–2008 | HBO | NFL Films | |
| Standing Room Only | 1976–1982 | HBO | | |
| Race for the Pennant | 1978–1992 | HBO | | |
| HBO Sneak Preview | 1980–1983 | HBO | | |
| HBO Magazine | 1982–1983 | HBO | | |
| Cinemax Screening Room | 1982–1983 | HBO | | |
| Time Was | 1982 | HBO | | |
| HBO Coming Attractions | 1983–1985 | HBO | | |
| Braingames | 1983–1985 | HBO | | |
| The Hitchhiker | 1983–1991 | HBO | | |
| HBO Mailbox | 1984–1985 | HBO | | |
| Vietnam War Story | 1987–1988 | HBO | | |
| Tanner '88 | 1988 | HBO | | |
| One Night Stand | 1989–2005 | HBO | | |
| Tales from the Crypt | 1989–1996 | HBO | Tales from the Crypt Holdings | |
| Real Sex | 1990–2009 | HBO | | |
| Sessions | 1991 | HBO | Castle Rock Entertainment | |
| Erotic Confessions | 1992–1996 | Cinemax | | |
| Def Comedy Jam | 1992–1997 | HBO | | |
| Hardcore TV | 1993–1994 | HBO | | |
| HBO Comedy Half-Hour | 1994–1998 | HBO | | |
| Autopsy | 1994–2008 | HBO | | |
| Taxicab Confessions | 1995–2006 | HBO | | |
| Hot Line | 1995–1996 | Cinemax | Magic Hour Pictures | |
| Real Sports with Bryant Gumbel | 1995–2023 | HBO | HBO Sports | |
| Happily Ever After: Fairy Tales for Every Child | 1995–2000 | HBO | Hyperion Animation, Two Oceans Entertainment Group and Confetti Entertainment Company | |
| Arli$$ | 1996–2003 | HBO | Tollin/Robbins Productions | |
| Boxing After Dark | 1996–2018 | HBO | | |
| The High Life | 1996 | HBO | Worldwide Pants | |
| The Chris Rock Show | 1997–2000 | HBO | CR Productions, Inc., 3 Arts Entertainment and HBO Downtown Productions | |
| Reverb | 1997–2001 | HBO | | |
| Todd McFarlane's Spawn | 1997–1999 | HBO | HBO Animation and Todd McFarlane Entertainment | |
| Spicy City | 1997 | HBO | HBO Animation | |
| Oz | 1997–2003 | HBO | The Levinson/Fontana Company, Viacom Productions and Rysher Entertainment | |
| Tenacious D | 1997–2000 | HBO | Dakota North Entertainment | |
| From the Earth to the Moon | 1998 | HBO | | |
| Sex and the City | 1998–2004 | HBO | Darren Star Productions | |
| The Sopranos | 1999–2007 | HBO | Chase Films and Brad Grey Television | |
| 30 by 30: Kid Flicks | 1999–2001 | HBO | | |
| A Little Curious | 1999–2000 | HBO | Curious Pictures | |
| Crashbox | 1999–2000 | HBO | Planet Grande Productions and Cuppa Coffee Animation | |
| Nightcap | 1999 | Cinemax | | |
| The Pleasure Zone | 1999 | Cinemax | MRG Entertainment | |
| Bedtime Stories | 2000 | Cinemax | MRG Entertainment | |
| Passion Cove | 2000–2001 | Cinemax | Alta Loma Entertainment | |
| Thrills | 2001 | Cinemax | Advanced Media Entertainment | |
| The Corner | 2000 | HBO | Blown Deadline Productions and Knee Deep Productions | |
| KO Nation | 2000–2001 | HBO | | |
| G String Divas | 2000 | HBO | | |
| Curb Your Enthusiasm | 2000–2024 | HBO | | |
| On the Record with Bob Costas | 2001–2004 | HBO | | |
| Six Feet Under | 2001–2005 | HBO | Actual Size Films and The Greenblatt/Janollari Studio | |
| Hard Knocks | 2001–present | HBO | HBO Sports and NFL Films | |
| Kindergarten | 2001 | HBO | Parallel Pictures & Television | |
| Freshman Year | 2001 | HBO | Planet Grande Productions | |
| Band of Brothers | 2001 | HBO | Playtone and DreamWorks Television | |
| The Mind of the Married Man | 2001–2002 | HBO | Comedy Arts Studios, 3 Arts Entertainment and Sunlight Productions | |
| Project Greenlight | 2001–2015 | HBO | | |
| Def Poetry Jam | 2002–2007 | HBO | | |
| The Best Sex Ever | 2002–2003 | Cinemax | MRG Entertainment | |
| Hotel Erotica | 2002–2003 | Cinemax | Blue Hotel Productions | |
| The Wire | 2002–2008 | HBO | Blown Deadline Productions | |
| El Perro y El Gato | 2003–2012 | HBO | Primal Screen | |
| Real Time with Bill Maher | 2003–present | HBO | Brad Grey Television and Bill Maher Productions | |
| Carnivàle | 2003–2005 | HBO | 3 Arts Entertainment and Twilight Time Films (pilot) | |
| K Street | 2003 | HBO | Interface Media Group | |
| Da Ali G Show | 2003–2004 | HBO | | |
| Deadwood | 2004–2006 | HBO | Roscoe Productions, Red Board Productions and Paramount Network Television | |
| Black Tie Nights; Hollywood Sexcapades | 2004–2005 | Cinemax | Black Tie Films and POV Pictures | |
| Entourage | 2004–2011 | HBO | Leverage Entertainment, Closest to the Hole Productions and Fly the Coop Entertainment (season 8) | |
| Family Bonds | 2004 | HBO | | |
| Pornucopia | 2004 | HBO | | |
| Unscripted | 2005 | HBO | Section Eight Productions and Warner Bros. Television | |
| Sex Games: Vegas; Sex Games: Cancún | 2005–2006 | Cinemax | MRG Entertainment | |
| Costas Now | 2005–2009 | HBO | | |
| Classical Baby | 2005–2027 | HBO | Poetry Foundation | |
| The Comeback | 2005–2014 | HBO | Is or Isn't Entertainment, Working Class Films and Warner Bros. Television | |
| Cathouse: The Series | 2005–2014 | HBO | | |
| Rome | 2005–2007 | HBO; BBC Two; Rai 2 | HD Vision Pictures | |
| Elizabeth I | 2005 | HBO; Channel 4 | co-production with HBO Films and Company Pictures | |
| Hotel Erotica Cabo | 2006 | Cinemax | OronaFilm | |
| Big Love | 2006–2011 | HBO | Anima Sola Productions and Playtone | |
| Lucky Louie | 2006 | HBO | Circus King, 3 Arts Entertainment, Snowpants Productions and HBO Independent Productions | |
| John from Cincinnati | 2007 | HBO | Red Board Productions and Saticoy Productions | |
| Tell Me You Love Me | 2007 | HBO | O&M / ANN SJM Productions and Pariah | |
| The Erotic Traveler | 2007 | Cinemax | | |
| Sin City Diaries | 2007 | Cinemax | | |
| Co-Ed Confidential | 2007–2010 | Cinemax | MRG Entertainment | |
| Flight of the Conchords | 2007–2009 | HBO | Dakota Pictures | |
| In Treatment | 2008–2021 | HBO | Leverage Entertainment, Closest to the Hole Productions and Sheleg | |
| John Adams | 2008 | HBO | High Noon Productions, Playtone and Mid Atlantic Films | |
| Generation Kill | 2008 | HBO | Company Pictures and Blown Deadline Productions | |
| House of Saddam | 2008 | BBC Two; HBO | BBC | |
| True Blood | 2008–2014 | HBO | Your Face Goes Here Entertainment | |
| Little Britain USA | 2008 | HBO | 19 Entertainment and Reveille Productions | |
| The Life & Times of Tim | 2008–2012 | HBO | Warner Bros. Television, Insane Loon Productions and Media Rights Capital (owner) | |
| Zane's Sex Chronicles | 2008–2010 | Cinemax | The Company Pictures | |
| Forbidden Science | 2009 | Cinemax | Dangerous Tomorrows, Inc. | |
| Lingerie | 2009–2010 | Cinemax | American Cinema Group | |
| Life on Top | 2009–2011 | Cinemax | Lott Productions | |
| Eastbound & Down | 2009–2013 | HBO | Gary Sanchez Productions, Rough House Pictures and Enemy MIGs Productions | |
| Brave New Voices | 2009–2010 | HBO | | |
| Hung | 2009–2011 | HBO | Tennessee Wolf Pack and Entertainment One | |
| Bored to Death | 2009–2011 | HBO | Dakota Pictures, 3 Arts Entertainment and Fair Harbour Productions | |
| The Neistat Brothers | 2010 | HBO | | |
| How to Make It in America | 2010–2011 | HBO | Leverage Entertainment, Closest to the Hole Productions and Big Meyer | |
| Funny or Die Presents | 2010–2011 | HBO | Funny or Die, Gary Sanchez Productions and Apatow Productions | |
| The Ricky Gervais Show | 2010–2012 | HBO; Channel 4/E4 | WildBrain Entertainment and Media Rights Capital (owner) | |
| The Pacific | 2010 | HBO | DreamWorks Television and Playtone | |
| Treme | 2010–2013 | HBO | Blown Deadline Productions | |
| Boardwalk Empire | 2010–2014 | HBO | Leverage Entertainment, Closest to the Hole Productions, Sikelia Productions and Cold Front Productions | |
| Mildred Pierce | 2011 | HBO | Kilter Films, John Wells Productions and MGM Television | |
| Femme Fatales | 2011–2012 | Cinemax | Four Amigos Entertainment and Radioactive Fishtank | |
| Skin to the Max | 2011–2012 | Cinemax | Stick Figure Productions | |
| Chemistry | 2011 | Cinemax | Ostar Productions | |
| Enlightened | 2011–2013 | HBO | Rip Cord Productions | |
| Luck | 2011–2012 | HBO | | |
| Strike Back | 2011–2020 | Cinemax; Sky One | Left Bank Pictures | |
| Game of Thrones | 2011–2019 | HBO | Television 360, Grok! Television, Generator Entertainment, Startling Television and Bighead Littlehead | |
| On Freddie Roach | 2012 | HBO | | |
| The Girl's Guide to Depravity | 2012–2013 | Cinemax | | |
| Girls | 2012–2017 | HBO | Apatow Productions and I Am Jenni Konner Productions | |
| Veep | 2012–2019 | HBO | Dundee Productions | |
| The Newsroom | 2012–2014 | HBO | | |
| Banshee | 2013–2016 | Cinemax | Your Face Goes Here Entertainment, Tropper Schicker Productions and One Olive | |
| Working Girls in Bed | 2013 | Cinemax | | |
| Zane's The Jump Off | 2013 | Cinemax | Planet Zane Productions and MRG Entertainment | |
| Vice | 2013–2019 | HBO | Bill Maher Productions and Vice Media | |
| Hello Ladies | 2013–2014 | HBO | Four Eyes Entertainment, Quantity Entertainment and ABC Studios | |
| Getting On | 2013–2015 | HBO | Anima Sola Productions and BBC Worldwide Productions | |
| True Detective | 2014–present | HBO | Anonymous Content, Parliament of Owls, Passenger and Neon Black | |
| Looking | 2014–2016 | HBO | Fair Harbor Productions | |
| Topless Prophet | 2014 | Cinemax | Pilgrim Studios | |
| Olive Kitteridge | 2014 | HBO | Playtone and As Is | |
| Silicon Valley | 2014–2019 | HBO | Judgemental Films Alec Berg Inc., Altschuler Krinsky Works and 3 Arts Entertainment | |
| Last Week Tonight with John Oliver | 2014–present | HBO | Avalon Television and Partially Important Productions | |
| The Knick | 2014–2018 | Cinemax | AMBEG Screen Products, Anonymous Content and Extension 765 | |
| Togetherness | 2015–2016 | HBO | Duplass Brothers Productions | |
| The Jinx | 2015 | HBO | HBO Documentary Films, Blumhouse Television and Hit the Ground Running | |
| The Brink | 2015 | HBO | Jerry Weintraub Productions, Everyman Pictures and Little City Iron Works | |
| Ballers | 2015–2019 | HBO | Seven Bucks Productions, Leverage Entertainment, Closest to the Hole Productions and Film 44 | |
| Show Me a Hero | 2015 | HBO | HBO Miniseries, Blown Deadline Productions and Pretty Pictures | |
| J. Cole: Road to Homecoming | 2015–2016 | HBO | Dreamville Films | |
| Animals | 2016–2018 | HBO | Karen BBQ, Duplass Brothers Productions and Starburns Industries | |
| Vinyl | 2016 | HBO | Paramount Television, Jagged Productions, Sikelia Productions and Cold Front Productions | |
| After the Thrones | 2016 | HBO | The Ring | |
| Any Given Wednesday with Bill Simmons | 2016 | HBO | | |
| The Night Of | 2016 | HBO | BBC Worldwide Productions, Bad Wolf and Film Rites | |
| Vice Principals | 2016–2017 | HBO | Rough House Pictures | |
| Quarry | 2016 | Cinemax | Anonymous Content, Night Sky Productions and One Olive | |
| Divorce | 2016–2019 | HBO | Pretty Matches Productions, Merman, Kapital Entertainment, | |
| Insecure | 2016–2021 | HBO | Hoorae Media, Penny for your Thoughts Entertainment and 3 Arts Entertainment | |
| Big Little Lies | 2017–2019 | HBO | Crazyrose, David E Kelley Productions, Hello Sunshine, Blossom Films | |
| Crashing | 2017–2019 | HBO | Joy Quota and Apatow Productions | |
| The Defiant Ones | 2017 | HBO | Silverback 5150 Pictures and Alcon Entertainment | |
| Room 104 | 2017–2020 | HBO | Duplass Brothers Productions | |
| The Deuce | 2017–2019 | HBO | Blown Deadline Productions, Rabbit Bandini Productions and Spartan Productions | |
| Mike Judge Presents: Tales from the Tour Bus | 2017–2018 | Cinemax | Judgmental Films, Zipper Bros. Films, Sutter Road Picture Co. and Diamond Docs | |
| 2 Dope Queens | 2018–2019 | HBO | | |
| Barry | 2018–2023 | HBO | Alec Berg Inc. and Hanarply | |
| Here and Now | 2018 | HBO | Your Face Goes Here Entertainment | |
| Sharp Objects | 2018 | HBO | Crazyrose, Fourth Born, Blumhouse Television, Tiny Pyro and Entertainment One | |
| Random Acts of Flyness | 2018–2022 | HBO | MVMT and A24 | |
| Wyatt Cenac's Problem Areas | 2018–2019 | HBO | Amalgalmated Bear, Sixteen String Jack Productions and Avalon Television | |
| Succession | 2018–2023 | HBO | Gary Sanchez Productions, Hyperobject Industries and Project Zeus | |
| The Shop | 2018–2025 | HBO | | |
| Camping | 2018 | HBO | | |
| Elvis Presley: The Searcher | 2018 | HBO | HBO Documentary Films | |
| Being Serena | 2018 | HBO | | |
| Axios on HBO | 2018–present | HBO | HBO Documentary Films, Axios Media and Downtown Community Television Center | |
| The Case Against Adnan Syed | 2019 | HBO | HBO Documentary Films, NBCUniversal International Studios, Working Title Television, Instinct Productions and Disarming Films | |
| Warrior | 2019–2023 | Cinemax/Max | Tropper Ink Productions, Perfect Storm Entertainment and Bruce Lee Entertainment | |
| Chernobyl | 2019 | HBO; Sky Atlantic | HBO Miniseries, Sky UK, Sister Pictures, The Mighty Mint, and Word Games | |
| Los Espookys | 2019–2022 | HBO | Broadway Video, Más Mejor, Antigravico, Fabula | |
| Euphoria | 2019–2026 | HBO | The Reasonable Branch, A24, Little Lamb, DreamCrew, ADD Content Agency, Hot and Tedy Productions | |
| A Black Lady Sketch Show | 2019–2023 | HBO | For Better or Words Inc., Hoorae Media, Jax Media, 3 Arts Entertainment | |
| The Righteous Gemstones | 2019–2025 | HBO | Rough House Pictures | |
| His Dark Materials | 2019–2022 | HBO; BBC One | Bad Wolf and New Line Cinema | |
| The Outsider | 2020 | HBO | Aggregate Films, Temple Hill Entertainment, Pieface Inc., Civic Center Media and MRC | |
| Avenue 5 | 2020–2022 | HBO | Dundee Productions | |
| McMillions | 2020 | HBO | Unrealistic Ideas and Fun Meter | |
| The Plot Against America | 2020 | HBO | RK Films, Annapurna Television and Blown Deadline Productions | |
| Run | 2020 | HBO | DryWrite, Wild Swim and Entertainment One | |
| We're Here | 2020–2024 | HBO | House of Opus 20 and The Intellectual Property Corporation | |
| Betty | 2020–2021 | HBO | A Dreamy Crystal Moselle Sequence..., Arfin Material (season 1) and Untitled Entertainment | |
| I May Destroy You | 2020 | HBO; BBC One | Various Artists Limited and FALKINA Productions | |
| Perry Mason | 2020–2023 | HBO | Dwight Street Book Club, Inflatable Mouse and Team Downey | |
| I'll Be Gone in the Dark | 2020–2021 | HBO | HBO Documentary Films and Story Syndicate | |
| The Vow | 2020–2022 | HBO | HBO Documentary Films and The Othrs | |
| The Third Day | 2020 | HBO; Sky Atlantic | Punchdrunk International, Plan B Entertainment, Scott Free Productions and Sky Studios | |
| Agents of Chaos | 2020 | HBO | HBO Documentary Films, Jigsaw Productions and Investigate Studios | |
| How To with John Wilson | 2020–2023 | HBO | Blow Out Productions and John's Movies | |
| Industry | 2020–present | HBO; BBC Two | Bad Wolf | |
| Tiger | 2021 | HBO | HBO Sports, Jigsaw Productions and Our Time Projects | |
| Painting with John | 2021–2023 | HBO | Hyperobject Industries | |
| The Lady and the Dale | 2021 | HBO | HBO Documentary Films, Duplass Brothers Productions and Cinemation Studios | |
| Allen v. Farrow | 2021 | HBO | HBO Documentary Films, Impact Partners, Jane Doe Films, Chicago Media Project, Artemis Rising Foundation and The Lozen Foundation | |
| Q Into the Storm | 2021 | HBO | HBO Documentary Films, Hyperobject Industries and Hyrax Films | |
| Exterminate All the Brutes | 2021 | HBO; Sky Documentaries | HBO Documentary Films, Velvet Film, Sky Documentaries and ARTE France | |
| The Nevers | 2021 | HBO | Mutant Enemy Productions | |
| Pray, Obey, Kill | 2021 | HBO | HBO Documentary Films, HBO Europe and Warner Bros. International Television Production | |
| Pause with Sam Jay | 2021–2022 | HBO | Donna's Daughter, A Penny for Your Thoughts, Avalon Television and Art & Industry | |
| The White Lotus | 2021–present | HBO | Pallogram, The District and Rip Cord Productions | |
| Catch and Kill: The Podcast Tapes | 2021 | HBO | HBO Documentary Films and World of Wonder | |
| 100 Foot Wave | 2021–present | HBO | Topic Studios, Amplify Pictures, Library Films, React Films and Cinetic Media | |
| Small Town News: KPVM Pahrump | 2021 | HBO | HBO Documentary Films and World of Wonder | |
| Obama: In Pursuit of a More Perfect Union | 2021 | HBO | HBO Documentary Films and Kunhardt Films | |
| NYC Epicenters 9/11→2021½ | 2021 | HBO | HBO Documentary Films and 40 Acres and a Mule Filmworks | |
| Level Playing Field | 2021 | HBO | HBO Sports and Vox Media Studios | |
| Nuclear Family | 2021 | HBO | HBO Documentary Films, Story Syndicate, Topic Studios, Impact Partners, Big Beach, Sustainable Films and Bunker | |
| Landscapers | 2021 | HBO; Sky Atlantic | Sky Studios, Sister Pictures and South of the River Pictures | |
| And Just Like That... | 2021–2025 | Max | Michael Patrick King Productions, Pretty Matches Productions and Rialto Films | |
| The Gilded Age | 2022–present | HBO | Universal Television and Neamo Film and Television | |
| Somebody Somewhere | 2022–2024 | HBO | Duplass Brothers Productions and The Mighty Mint | |
| Winning Time: The Rise of the Lakers Dynasty | 2022–2023 | HBO | Jim Hecht Productions, Jason Shuman Productions, Steeplechase Amusements and Hyperobject Industries | |
| The Invisible Pilot | 2022 | HBO | | |
| We Own This City | 2022 | HBO | Spartan Productions and Blown Deadline Productions | |
| The Baby | 2022 | Proverbial Pictures, Sky Studios and Sister | | |
| The Time Traveler's Wife | 2022 | Hartswood Films, Warner Bros. Television and New Line Cinema | | |
| Irma Vep | 2022 | HBO; OCS City | A24, Vortex Sutra, The Reasonable Bunch and Little Lamb | |
| Mind Over Murder | 2022 | HBO | HBO Documentary Films, Vox Media Studios, Little Horse Crossing the River and Truth.Media | |
| The Anarchists | 2022 | HBO | HBO Documentary Films, Blumhouse Television and Bird Murmur | |
| The Rehearsal | 2022–present | HBO | Blow Out Productions | |
| House of the Dragon | 2022–present | HBO | GRRM, Basford Sword and 1:26 Pictures Inc. | |
| The Last of Us | 2023−present | HBO | Sony Pictures Television, PlayStation Productions, Naughty Dog, The Mighty Mint and Word Games | |
| White House Plumbers | 2023 | HBO | Fearless Films, Hot Seat Productions, Perfect Pleasant Productions, wiip, The District and Crash&Salvage | |
| The Idol | 2023 | HBO | A24, Bron, Little Lamb, The Reasonable Bunch, Manic Phase and People Pleaser | |
| Jerrod Carmichael Reality Show | 2024 | HBO | Morningside Entertainment and Edgeline Films | |
| Fantasmas | 2024 | HBO | Irony Point, Frut Tree and 3 Arts Entertainment | |
| Dune: Prophecy | 2024–present | HBO | Wandering Jew Productions, Herbert Properties, Inc., Flying Life and Legendary Television | |
| I Love LA | 2025–present | HBO | Bizzaro Brothers and Treacly Productions | |
| A Knight of the Seven Kingdoms | 2026–present | HBO | Friendly Wolf Pictures and GRRM | |
| Neighbors | 2026–present | HBO | 2026–present | A24, Gummy Films, Genma Pictures and Central Pictures |
| Youth | 2026–present | HBO; HBO Max (United Kingdom) | 2026–present | co-production with Merman |
| Six Feet Under Follow-Up | TBA | | | |

==== HBO Documentary Films ====
| Title | Years | Network | Notes |
|---|---|---|---|
| Saving My Tomorrow | 2014–2017 | HBO | co-production with HBO Entertainment |
| The Jinx | 2015 | HBO | co-production with HBO Entertainment, Blumhouse Television and Hit the Ground Running |
| The Zen Diaries of Garry Shandling | 2018 | HBO | co-production with HBO Entertainment, Apatow Productions and RadicalMedia |
| Axios on HBO | 2018–present | HBO | co-production with HBO Entertainment, Axios Media and Downtown Community Television Center |
| The Case Against Adnan Syed | 2019 | HBO | co-production with HBO Entertainment, NBCUniversal International Studios, Working Title Television, Instinct Productions and Disarming Films |
| I'll Be Gone in the Dark | 2020–2021 | HBO | co-production with HBO Entertainment and Story Syndicate |
| The Vow | 2020–2022 | HBO | co-production with HBO Entertainment and The Othrs |
| Agent of Chaos | 2020 | HBO | co-production with HBO Entertainment, Jigsaw Productions and Investigate Studios |
| The Lady and the Dale | 2021 | HBO | co-production with HBO Entertainment, Duplass Brothers Productions and Cinemation Studios |
| Allen v. Farrow | 2021 | HBO | co-production with HBO Entertainment, Impact Partners, Jane Doe Films, Chicago Media Project, Artemis Rising Foundation and The Rozen Foundation |
| Q Into the Storm | 2021 | HBO | co-production with HBO Entertainment, Hyperobject Industries and Hyrax Films |
| Exterminate All the Brutes | 2021 | HBO; Sky Documentaries | co-production with HBO Entertainment, Velvet Film, Sky Documentaries and ARTE France |
| Pray, Obey, Kill | 2021 | HBO | co-production with HBO Entertainment, HBO Europe and Warner Bros. ITVP Sweden |
| Catch and Kill: The Podcast Tapes | 2021 | HBO | co-production with HBO Entertainment and World of Wonder |
| Small Town News: KPVM Pahrump | 2021 | HBO | co-production with HBO Entertainment and World of Wonder |
| Obama: In Pursuit of a More Perfect Union | 2021 | HBO | co-production with HBO Entertainment and Kunhardt Films |
| NYC Epicenters 9/11→2021½ | 2021 | HBO | co-production with HBO Entertainment and 40 Acres and a Mule Filmworks |
| Nuclear Family | 2021 | HBO | co-production with HBO Entertainment, Story Syndicate, Topic Studios, Impact Partners, Big Beach, Sustainable Films and Bunker |
| Phoenix Rising | 2022 | HBO | co-production with HBO Entertainment, Disarming Films and The Artemis Rising Foundation |
| Mind Over Murder | 2022 | HBO | co-production with HBO Entertainment, Vox Media Studios, Little Horse Crossing the River and Truth.Media |
| The Anarchists | 2022 | HBO | co-production with HBO Entertainment, Blumhouse Television and Bird Murmur |

=== HBO Europe ===
| Title | Years | Network | Co-production with |
|---|---|---|---|
| Terapie | 2011–2019 | HBO Europe | |
| Umbre | 2014–present | HBO Europe | |
| The Silent Valley | 2016 | HBO Europe | |
| Hackerville | 2018 | HBO Europe; TNT Serie | |
| The Pioneer | 2019 | HBO Europe | |
| 30 Coins | 2020–2023 | HBO Europe | Pokeepsie Films |
| Pray, Obey, Kill | 2021 | HBO | HBO Entertainment, HBO Documentary Films and Warner Bros. ITVP Sweden |
| The Informant | 2022–present | HBO Max | |

=== HBO Downtown Productions ===
| Title | Years | Network | Notes |
|---|---|---|---|
| Night After Night with Allan Havey | 1989–1992 | The Comedy Channel; Comedy Central | |
| Short Attention Span Theater | 1989–1994 | The Comedy Channel; Comedy Central | |
| Sports Monster | 1991 | The Comedy Channel; Comedy Central | |
| Stand Up, Stand Up | 1991–1992 | Comedy Central | |
| Inside the NFL | 1992 | HBO | co-production with NFL Films |
| Women Aloud | 1992–1993 | Comedy Central | co-production with Comedy Partners |
| Mystery Science Theater 3000 | 1992–1996 | Comedy Central | co-production with Best Brains; Currently owned by Shout! Factory |
| 2 Drink Minimum | 1993–1994 | Comedy Central | co-production with Comedy Partners |
| Politically Incorrect | 1993–2002 | Comedy Central; ABC | co-production with Comedy Partners |
| Dr. Katz, Professional Therapist | 1995–2002 | Comedy Central | co-production with Tom Snyder Productions, Popular Arts Entertainment and Comedy Partners |
| Exit 57 | 1995–1996 | Comedy Central | co-production with Comedy Partners |
| The Chris Rock Show | 1997–2000 | HBO | co-production with HBO Entertainment, 3 Arts Entertainment and CR Enterprises, Inc. |

=== HBO Independent Productions ===
| Title | Years | Network | Notes |
|---|---|---|---|
| Roc | 1991–1994 | Fox | |
| The Paula Poundstone Show | 1992 | HBO | co-production with Morra, Brezner & Steinberg Entertainment, Inc. |
| Down the Shore | 1992 | Fox | co-production with Caravan Entertainment and 3 Arts Entertainment |
| Martin | 1992–1997 | Fox | co-production with You Go Boy! Productions (seasons 3–5) |
| Laurel Avenue | 1993 | HBO | mini-series; co-production with Elsboy Entertainment |
| Daddy Dearest | 1993 | Fox | co-production with Van Zandt/Milmore Productions and 3 Arts Entertainment |
| Get Smart | 1995 | Fox | co-production with Columbia Pictures Television (Note: Distributed by Sony Pictures Television; HBO owns the program's copyrights.) |
| House of Buggin' | 1995 | Fox | co-production with Bregman/Baer Productions |
| The Last Frontier | 1996 | Fox | |
| Everybody Loves Raymond (Note: Distributed in syndication by CBS Television Distribution; HBO owns the program's copyrights.) | 1996–2005 | CBS | co-production with Where's Lunch and Worldwide Pants Incorporated |
| The Jury | 2004 | Fox | co-production with The Levinson/Fontana Company, MarlJim Productions and 20th Century Fox Television |
| Lucky Louie | 2006 | HBO | co-production with HBO Entertainment, Circus King, 3 Arts Entertainment and Snowpants Productions |

=== Time-Life Television ===
| Title | Years | Network | Notes |
|---|---|---|---|
| Wild, Wild World of Animals | 1973–1978 | Syndication | |
| Harold Lloyd's World of Comedy | 1974 | Syndication | |
| World War II: G.I. Diary | 1978–1979 | Syndication | |
| The Africans | 1978 | Nine Network | co-production with Nine Network and Meredith Broadcasting |
| Blind Ambition | 1979 | CBS | |
| Wilderness Alive | 1979 | Syndication | miniseries |
| The Search for Alexander the Great | 1981 | PBS | co-production with VideoArts TV |

==== Talent Associates ====
| Title | Years | Network | Notes |
|---|---|---|---|
| East Side/West Side | 1963–1964 | CBS | co-production with United Artists Television; Currently distributed by MGM Television |
| Get Smart | 1965–1970 | NBC/CBS | |
| The Hero | 1966 | NBC | |
| N.Y.P.D. | 1967–1969 | ABC | |
| Diana | 1973–1974 | NBC | |
| Eleanor and Franklin | 1976 | ABC | mini-series |

== Paramount International Networks ==
=== Channel 5 Broadcasting ===
| Title | Original run | Network | Co-producer(s) | Notes |
|---|---|---|---|---|
| 5 News | 1997–present | Channel 5 | ITN (1997–2004; 2012–present); Sky News (2005–12) | 1997–2004 episodes owned by ITN |
| Animal Antics | 1997 | Channel 5 | Two Sides TV | |
| Little Antics | 1999 | Channel 5 | Two Sides TV | |
| Happy Monsters | 2000 | Channel 5 | Roland Rat Enterprises | |
| When I Grow Up | 2001 | Channel 5 | Turn On TV | |
| Animal Express | 2002–2003 | Channel 5 | Two Hands Productions | |
| Monkey Makes | 2002–2003 | Channel 5 | Top TV | |
| MechaNick | 2002–2004 | Channel 5 | Impossible Television | |
| Sailor Sid | 2002–2004 | Channel 5 | Kerrupt Animation | short series |
| Michaela's Wild Challenge | 2002–2006 | Channel 5 | Two Hands Productions | |
| A House Just Like Yours | 2003–2004 | Channel 5 | Two Hats Film & Television | |
| Bird Bath | 2004 | Channel 5 | Impossible Television | |
| Look! | 2004 | Channel 5 | Two Sides TV | short series |
| My First | 2004 | Channel 5 | Wised Up Productions Limited | |
| Murder Prevention | 2004 | Channel 5 | World Productions | |
| The Secret of Eel Island | 2005–2006 | Channel 5 | Eye Film and Television Productions | |
| Demolition Dad | 2005–2006 | Channel 5 | Two Hats Film & Television and Here's One I Made Earlier Productions | |
| Royal Institution Christmas Lectures | 2005–2008 | Channel 5 | Windfall Films | |
| The Beeps | 2007–2008 | Channel 5 | Impossible Television | |
| Animal Families | 2009–2010 | Channel 5 | Two Hands Productions | |
| Lip Sync Battle UK | 2016–2018 | Channel 5 | Whizz Kid Entertainment | |

=== Ten Network Holdings ===
| Title | Original run | Network | Co-producer(s) | Notes |
|---|---|---|---|---|
| 10 News First | 1965–present | Network 10 | | |
| Ten Eyewitness News Morning | 1980–2014 | Network 10 | | |
| Good Morning Australia | 1981–1992 | Network 10 | | |
| The Early Bird Show | 1985–1989 | Network 10 | | |
| Video Hits | 1987–2011 | Network 10 | | |
| Ridgey Didge | 1987–1989 | Network 10 | | |
| Mulligrubs | 1988–1996 | Network 10 | | |
| Ten Eyewitness News Late | 1991–present | Network 10 | | |
| Totally Wild | 1992–2021 | Network 10/10 Peach/10 Shake | | |
| 10 News First Weekend | 1994–present | Network 10 | | |
| In the Box | 1998–2006 | Network 10 | | |
| The Secret Life of Us | 2001–2005 | Network 10 | Optus Television and Southern Star Entertainment | |
| ttn | 2004–2008 | Network 10 | | |
| Scope | 2005–2020 | Network 10/10 Peach | | |
| Toasted TV | 2005–2020 | Network 10/10 Peach | | |
| Ten Eyewitness News Early | 2006–2014 | Network 10 | | |
| Puzzle Play | 2006–2011 | Network 10 | | |
| Wurrawhy | 2011–2016 | Network 10/10 Peach | | |
| Breakfast | 2012 | Network 10 | | |
| Wake Up | 2013–2014 | Network 10 | | |
| Studio 10 | 2013–2023 | Network 10 | | |
| Crocamole | 2016–2019 | 10 Peach | | |
| 10 News First Breakfast | 2022 | Network 10 | | |
| Last King of the Cross | 2023–2024 | Paramount+ | Cineflix and Helium Productions | |
| Fake | 2024 | Paramount+ | Kindling Pictures | |

=== Telefe Contenidos ===
| Title | Original run | Network | Notes |
|---|---|---|---|
| Casados con hijos | 2005–2006 | Telefe | co-production with Sony Pictures Television International |
| Montecristo | 2006 | Telefe | |
| Vidas Robadas | 2008 | Telefe | |
| Botineras | 2009–2010 | Telefe | co-production with Underground Producciones and Endemol |
| Cain and Abel | 2010 | Telefe | |
| El elegido | 2010 | Telefe | co-production with El Árbol |
| Dulce amor | 2012–2013 | Telefe | co-production with L.C. Acción Producciones |
| Sres. Papis | 2014 | Telefe | |
| Camino al Amor | 2014 | Telefe | co-production with L.C. Acción Producciones |
| Entre caníbales | 2015 | Telefe | co-production with Sony Pictures Television and 100 Bares Producciones |
| Educando a Nina | 2016 | Telefe | co-production with Underground Producciones |
| Kally's Mashup | 2017–2019 | Nickelodeon Latin America | co-production with Anders Media and 360 Powwow |
| 100 días para enamorarse | 2018 | Telefe | co-production with Underground Producciones |
| Campanas en la noche | 2019 | Telefe | |

=== Paramount Television International Studios ===
| Title | Years | Network | Notes |
|---|---|---|---|
| Caught on Camera | 2013–2018 | Channel 5 | |
| Cruising with Jane McDonald | 2017–2021 | Channel 5 | |
| Jane McDonald & Friends | 2018–2020 | Channel 5 | |
| Wheel of Fortune Poland | 2017–present | TVP 2 | co-production with Telewizja Polska, S. A. |
| Resistiré | 2019 | Mega/MTV | |
| Trevor McDonald's Indian Train Adventure | 2019 | ITV | |
| MTV Cribs UK | 2019–2021 | MTV | |
| Se rentan cuartos | 2019–2022 | Comedy Central | co-production with Endemol Shine Boomdog |
| Dani Who? | 2019–2020 | Paramount Channel | co-production with Argos Comunicación |
| Jeopardy! Poland | 2020–present | TVP 2 | co-production with Telewizja Polska, S. A. |
| Ana | 2020 | Comedy Central; Amazon Prime Video | co-production with Argos Comunicación |
| Goldie's Oldies | 2021 | Nickelodeon | |
| True Life Crime UK | 2021–2022 | MTV | |
| Catfish UK | 2021–present | MTV | |
| Parot | 2021 | Amazon Prime Video | co-production with RTVE and Onza |
| Sharkdog | 2021–2023 | Netflix | co-production with One Animation |
| Rio Shore | 2021–2023 | MTV | co-production with Endemol Shine Brasil |
| Stories to Stay Awake | 2021–2022 | Amazon Prime Video | co-production with ZDF Studios and Isla Audiovisual; Co-owned with ZDF Studios |
| Cecilia | 2021–2023 | Paramount+ | co-production with Animal De Luz Films and Oficina Burman |
| The First of Us | 2022 | Telefe | |
| Harina | 2022–present | Comedy Central | co-production with The Lift Entertainment |
| The Flatshare | 2022 | Paramount+ | co-production with 42 |
| The Challenge UK | 2023 | Channel 5 | co-production with Bunim/Murray Productions |
| The Gold | 2023–2025 | BBC One; Paramount+ | co-production with Tannadice Pictures |
| No Escape | 2023 | Paramount+ | co-production with New Pictures |
| The Turkish Detective | 2023 | Paramount+ | co-production with Miramax Television and Ay Yapim |
| One Trillion Dollars | 2023 | Paramount+ | co-production with W&B Television |
| Fleeting Lies | 2023 | SkyShowtime | co-production with El Deseo |
| Sexy Beast | 2024 | Paramount+ | co-production with Train A Comin' Productions, AC Chapter One and Anonymous Content; Originally developed at Paramount Network |
| A Gentleman in Moscow | 2024 | Paramount+ | co-production with Lionsgate Television, Vanity Film & TV, Popcorn Storm Pictures and Moonriver Productions |

=== Paramount Australia ===
| Title | Years | Network | Notes |
|---|---|---|---|
| NCIS: Sydney | 2023–present | Paramount+/CBS/ Network 10 | Produced by Endemol Shine Australia for CBS Studios and Paramount Australia |

=== Noggin, LLC ===
Since 2024, Noggin LLC's assets are currently owned by the independent United Kingdom-based company Noggin Holdings, Inc.

| Title | Years | Network | Co-production with | Notes |
|---|---|---|---|---|
| Phred on Your Head Show | 1999–2000 | Noggin | MTV Animation and Possible Worlds | |
| A Walk in Your Shoes | 1999–2005 | Nickelodeon; Noggin | Bullfrog Productions | |
| Oobi | 2000–2002 | Noggin | Little Airplane Productions | interstitial series |
| On the Team | 2001 | Noggin | Hitchhiker Films and Stolen Car Productions | |
| The URL with Phred Show | 2001–2002 | Noggin | | |
| Sponk! | 2001–2002 | Noggin | Insight Productions and Sesame Workshop | |
| Play with Me Sesame | 2002–2007 | Noggin | Sesame Workshop (owner) | |
| Oobi | 2003–2005 | Noggin | Little Airplane Productions | |
| LOL with The N | 2003 | The N | | |
| Girls v. Boys | 2003–2005 | The N | Dancing Toad Productions | |
| O'Grady | 2004–2006 | The N | Soup2Nuts | |
| Miracle's Boys | 2005 | The N | | |
| Jack's Big Music Show | 2005–2007 | Noggin | Spiffy Pictures | |
| South of Nowhere | 2005–2008 | The N | Tom Lynch Company | |
| The Upside Down Show | 2006 | Noggin | Blink Films for Sesame Workshop | |
| Kinderwood | 2020–2021 | Noggin app | Titmouse, Inc. | |

== Television movies and specials ==
=== Skydance Television Studios Group ===
==== CBS Studios ====
- Out of Office (2022) (co-production with MTV Entertainment Studios and Propagate Content)
- Pickled (2022) (co-production with Spartina Productions and Funny or Die)
- Reindeer in Here (2022) (co-production with CBS Eye Animation Productions, The Tiny Toons Co. and Jam Filled Entertainment)

===== Paramount Television =====
- Seven in Darkness (1969)
- The Silent Gun (1969)
- Quarantined (1970)
- Weekend of Terror (1970)
- Assault on the Wayne (1971)
- Dr. Cook's Garden (1971)
- Escape (1971)
- Terror in the Sky (1971)
- Women in Chains (1972)
- The New Healers (1972)
- Night of Terror (1972)
- The Heist (1972)
- The Weekend Nun (1972)
- The Devil's Daughter (1973)
- Poor Devil (1973)
- Call to Danger (1973)
- A Time for Love (1973)
- Catch-22 (1973)
- Night Games (1974)
- Paramount Presents (1974)
- The Underground Man (1974)
- Locusts (1974)
- The Legend of Lizzie Borden (1975)
- The Last Day (1975)
- The Killer Who Wouldn't Die (1976)
- Law and Order (1976)
- Look What's Happened to Rosemary's Baby (1976)
- The Secret Life of John Chapman (1976)
- Yesterday's Child (1977)
- Secrets (1977)
- Red Alert (1977)
- Delta County, U.S.A. (1977)
- Dog and Cat (1977)
- Mary Jane Harper Cried Last Night (1977)
- Escape from Bogen County (1977)
- Having Babies II (1977)
- Sharon: Portrait of a Mistress (1977)
- The Defection of Simas Kudirka (1978)
- The Ghost of Flight 401 (1978)
- Snowblind (1978)
- Perfect Gentleman (1978)
- Getting Married (1978)
- True Grit: A Further Adventure (1978)
- A Family Upside Down (1978)
- Flesh & Blood (1979)
- Mind Over Murder (1979)
- The Gift (1979)
- Stunts Unlimited (1980)
- Top of the Hill (1980)
- The Girl, the Gold Watch & Everything (1980)
- Shōgun (1980)
- Act of Love (1980)
- The Brady Girls Get Married (1981)
- A Woman Called Golda (1982)
- The Renegades (1982)
- The Last Ninja (1983)
- The Jesse Owens Story (1984)
- Wallenberg: A Hero's Story (1985)
- Command 5 (1985)
- Family Ties Vacation (1985)
- Roman Holiday (1987)
- Shooter (1988)
- A Very Brady Christmas (1988)
- The Kid Who Loved Christmas (1990)
- Not of This World (1991)
- Love Kills (1991)
- Yesterday Today (1992)
- Praying Mantis (1993)
- The Odd Couple: Together Again (1993)
- MacGyver: Lost Treasure of Atlantis (1994)
- MacGyver: Trail to Doomsday (1994)
- The Shamrock Conspiracy (1995)
- Star Command (1996)
- Hollywood Confidential (1997)
- The Garden of Redemption (1997)
- Gold Coast (1997)
- The Defenders: Choices of Evils (1998)
- The Warlord: Battle for the Galaxy (1998)
- The Tiger Woods Story (1998)
- The Defenders: Taking the First (1998)
- Aldrich Ames: Traitor Within (1998)
- The Last Man on Planet Earth (1999)
- Virtual Nightmare (2000)
- Growing Up Brady (2000)
- A House Divided (2000)
- The Thin Blue Lie (2000)
- Papa's Angels (2000)
- My Horrible Year! (2001)
- The Day Reagan Was Shot (2001)
- Keep the Faith, Baby (2002)
- 10,000 Black Men Named George (2002)
- Bobbie's Girl (2002)
- Sightings: Heartland Ghost (2002)
- The Brady Bunch in the White House (2002)
- The Pentagon Papers (2003)
- Comfort and Joy (2003)
- Amber Frey: Witness for the Prosecution (2005)
- Mayday (2005)
- Walker, Texas Ranger: Trial by Fire (2005)

====== Wilshire Court Productions ======
- Fire and Rain (1989)
- Wheels of Terror (1990)
- After the Shock (1990)
- Nightmare on the 13th Floor (1990)
- Deadly Desire (1991)
- Child of Darkness, Child of Light (1991)
- Duplicates (1992)
- Treacherous Crossing (1992)
- Body Language (1992)
- Through the Eyes of a Killer (1992)
- Tainted Blood (1993)
- Without Warning: Terror in the Woods (1993)
- Praying Mantis (1993)
- Rubdown (1993)
- The Substitute (1993)
- Linda (1993)
- Official Denial (1993)
- Dying to Remember (1993)
- Jerico Fever (1993)
- Accidental Meeting (1994)
- Parallel Lives (1994)
- Trapped in Space (1994)
- A Vow to Kill (1995)
- Tall, Dark and Deadly (1995)
- My Antonia (1995)
- As Good as Dead (1995)
- When the Dark Man Calls (1995)
- Trilogy of Terror II (1996)
- Contagious (1997)
- Sins of the Mind (1997)
- The Ticket (1997)
- Melanie Darrow (1997)
- Bad to the Bone (1997)
- Ms. Scrooge (1997)
- Atomic Dog (1998)
- The Con (1998)
- Chameleon (1998)
- Alien Cargo (1999)
- Sweetwater: A True Rock Story (1999)
- Strange Justice (1999)
- Monster! (1999)
- The Way She Moves (2001)
- Too Legit: The MC Hammer Story (2001)
- Warning: Parental Advisory (2002)
- Code 11–14 (2003)

====== Viacom Pictures/Productions ======
- Evel Knievel (1974)
- A Question of Love (1978)
- A Last Cry for Help (1979)
- She's Dressed to Kill (1979)
- Heaven Only Knows (1979)
- To Race the Wind (1980)
- Nurse (1980)
- All God's Children (1980)
- Angel on My Shoulder (1980)
- Enola Gay: The Men, The Mission, The Atomic Bomb (1980)
- East of Eden (1981)
- For Ladies Only (1981)
- Thursday's Child (1983)
- The Return of the Man from U.N.C.L.E.: The Fifteen Years Later Affair (1983) (with Michael Sloan Productions)
- The Face of Rage (1983)
- Concrete Beat (1984)
- The Ratings Game (1984)
- Kids Don't Tell (1985)
- Suburban Beat (1985)
- Perry Mason Returns (1985)
- Return to Mayberry (1986)
- The Secret Garden (1987)
- Payoff (1991)
- The Fear Inside (1992)
- Paris Trout (1992)
- Nails (1992)
- Scam (1993)
- Children of the Mist (1993)
- Gramps (1995)
- Sabrina the Teenage Witch (1996)
- Alibi (1997)
- The Right Connections (1997)
- Sabrina Goes to Rome (1998)
- In the Doghouse (1998)
- Sabrina Down Under (1999)
- Avalon: Beyond the Abyss (1999)
- Two of Us (2000)
- Love Song (2000)
- Once Upon a Christmas (2000)
- Warden of Red Rock (2001)
- The Wilde Girls (2001)
- Twice Upon a Christmas (2001)
- Bang Bang You're Dead (2002)
- Finding John Christmas (2003)
- The Legend of Butch & Sundance (2003)

===== Spelling Television =====
- The Monk (1969)
- How Awful About Allan (1970)
- River of Gold (1971)
- Two for the Money (1972)
- Rolling Man (1972)
- Kate Bliss and the Ticker Tape Kid (1978)
- The Users (1978)
- The Power Within (1979)
- The Return of The Mod Squad (1979) (with Danny Thomas Productions)
- Massarati and the Brain (1982)
- Velvet (1984)
- International Airport (1985)
- Mr. and Mrs. Ryan (1986)
- Day One (1989) (with World International Network)
- Just Temporary (1989)
- Satan's School for Girls (2000)

====== Sunn Classic Pictures ======
- A Killer in the Family (1983) (co-production with Stan Margulies Productions)
- Houston: The Legend of Texas (1986) (co-production with JD Feigelson Productions)
- The Christmas Gift (1986) (co-production with Rosemont Productions)

====== QM Productions ======
- The Aliens are Coming! (1980) (with Woodruff Productions)
- The Return of Frank Cannon (1980)
- Senior Trip (1981) (with Kenneth Johnson Productions)
- September Gun (1983)

===== CBS Productions =====
- Rose Parade (1948–2005)
- The Thanksgiving Day Parade on CBS (1948–present)
- Summer is Forever (1969)
- The Brotherhood of the Bell (1970)
- 11:59: Last Minute to Choose (1971)
- The Cat in the Hat (1971)
- The American Revolution: 1770–1783: A Conversation with Lord North (1971)
- Goodbye, Raggedy Ann (1971)
- A Death of Innocence (1971)
- Mongo's Back in Town (1971)
- Visions of Death (1972)
- Something Evil (1972)
- The Lorax (1972)
- The Family Rico (1972)
- Deadly Harvest (1972)
- The House Without a Christmas Tree (1972)
- Crime Club (1973)
- Hunter (1973)
- The Horror at 37,000 Feet (1973)
- Coffee, Tea or Me? (1973)
- Dr. Seuss on the Loose (1973)
- The Thanksgiving Treasure (1973)
- The Migrants (1974)
- Addie and the King of Hearts (1975)
- The Hoober-Bloob Highway (1975)
- The Easter Promise (1975)
- I Want To Keep My Baby (1976)
- Relentless (1977)
- Thaddeus Rose and Eddie (1978)
- 30th Primetime Emmy Awards (1978) (co-production for Academy of Television Arts & Sciences)
- Like Mom, Like Me (1978)
- First, You Cry (1978) (co-production for MTM Enterprises)
- Crisis in Mid-Air (1979)
- You Can't Go Home Again (1979)
- The Wild Wild West Revisited (1979)
- Orphan Train (film) (1979) (co-production for EMI Television)
- More Wild Wild West (1980)
- 33rd Primetime Emmy Awards (1981) (co-production for Academy of Television Arts & Sciences)
- A Tribute to Count Basie (1981)
- Killing at Hell's Gate (1981)
- The Million Dollar Infield (1982)
- Muggable Mary, Street Cop (1982)
- Rascals and Robbers: The Secret Adventures of Tom Sawyer and Huckleberry Finn (1982)
- Napoleon Conquers America (1982)
- The Gift of Life (1982)
- Maid in America (1982)
- Drop-Out Father (1982)
- Country Gold (1982)
- Games Mother Never Taught You (1982)
- Listen to Your Heart (1982)
- Illusions (1983)
- Another Woman's Child (1983)
- Running Out (1983)
- The Other Woman (1983)
- First Affair (1983)
- Two Kinds of Love (1983)
- Quarterback Princess (1983)
- Hobson's Choice (1983)
- Last of The Great Survivors (1983)
- Calamity Jane (1984)
- Getting Physical (1984)
- First Steps (1985)
- Brotherly Love (1985)
- Classified Love (1986)
- Blind Justice (1986)
- That Secret Sunday (1986)
- One Police Plaza (1986)
- Deadly Deception (1987)
- Gunsmoke: Return to Dodge (1987)
- Body of Evidence (1988)
- Case Closed (1988) (co-production with Houston Motion Picture Entertainment, Inc.)
- Fifty Years of Television: A Golden Celebration (1989)
- Gunsmoke: The Last Apache (1990)
- Shangri-la Plaza (1990) (pilot; co-production with Castle/Safan/Mueller Productions)
- Goodnight, Sweet Wife: A Murder in Boston (1990) (co-production with Arnold Shapiro Productions)
- The Honeymooners Anniversary Special (1990)
- Donor (1990)
- Blood River (1991) (co-production with Little Apple Productions)
- Gunsmoke: To the Last Man (1992)
- The Year of the General (1992)
- Guiding Light: The Primetime Special (1992)
- Secret Lives of Husbands and Wives (1992)
- Moment of Truth (1992)
- Ultimate Revenge (1992 TV pilot) (co-production with Woody Fraser Productions and Reeves Entertainment)
- The President's Child (1992)
- Malcolm X: The Real Story (1992)
- Somalia: A Country is Dying (1992)
- Frosty Returns (1992) (co-production with Bill Melendez Productions and Broadway Video)
- Coming Up Roses (1993–2002)
- The Carol Burnett Show: A Reunion (1993)
- The Man with Three Wives (1993) (co-production with Arnold Shapiro Productions)
- Gunsmoke: The Long Ride (1993)
- Labor of Love: The Arlette Schweitzer Story (1993)
- With Hostile Intent (1993)
- Love, Honor & Obey: The Last Mafia Marriage (1993) (co-production with Reteitalia Productions, SPA)
- The Legend of The Beverly Hillbillies (1993)
- Schwarzkopf in Vietnam: A Soldier Returns (1993)
- Harlan and Merleen (1993; two-part TV pilot)
- For Love and Glory (1993)
- Jack (1993)
- Terror in the Night (1994)
- Gunsmoke: One Man's Justice (1994)
- Search for Grace (1994)
- D-Day (1994)
- Angels Among Us (1994 TV pilot)
- Halloween! (1994)
- In the Shadow of Evil (1995)
- Magician's Favorite Magicians (1995) (co-production with Armand Grant DGS., Inc. and Milt Larsen Brookledge Corporation)
- The Man in the Attic (1995) (co-production with Showtime Networks)
- A Streetcar Named Desire (1995)
- A Mother's Instinct (1996)
- Uncommon Heroes (1996 TV pilot) (co-production with Arnold Shapiro Productions)
- The Story of Santa Claus (1996) (co-production with Arnold Shapiro Productions)
- Stolen Woman, Captured Hearts (1997)
- Heart Full of Rain (1997)
- Monday After the Miracle (1998)
- Murder at 75 Birch (1999)
- 26th Daytime Emmy Awards (1999)
- A Song From the Heart (1999)
- Secret of Giving (1999)
- One Kill (2000)
- The Christmas Secret (2000)
- Blackout (2001)
- Dr Quinn: The Heart Within (2001)
- The Sons of Mistletoe (2001)

===== CBS Eye Productions =====
- Traitors Within (2002)
- History Now: SARS and the New Plagues (2003)
- The 9/11 Commission Report (2004)
- First Arab Israeli Plane Hijacking (2007) (co-production with CBS News)
- Shark Week: Day of the Shark (2008) (co-production with Beanfield Productions)
- Disaster on K2 (2009) (co-production with Beanfield Productions, Ascending Path and Capsule Media)
- Ripped Off: Maddoff and the Scamming of America (2009)
- Kidnapped for 18 Years: The Jaycee Dugard Story (2009)
- TV Murders: Jasmine Fiore and Anne Pressly (2010)
- Who Is the Real Jordan van der Sloot? (2010)
- Best of the Road (2012)
- David Letterman: A Life on Television (2015)

===== See It Now Studios =====
- 26th Street Garage: The FBI's Untold Story of 9/11 (2021) (co-production with Efran Films)
- Race Against Time: The CIA and 9/11 (2021)
- Undeniable: The Truth to Remember (2022) (co-production with ATTN:)
- Watergate: High Crimes in the White House (2022)
- Superpower (2023)

==== Paramount Television Studios ====
- Grease: Live (2016) (Live TV special based on the 1978 movie by Paramount Pictures. Co-produced with Marc Platt Productions.)

===== Showtime Studios =====
Chicken Soup for the Soul Entertainment distributed most Showtime Original Pictures made between 1995 and 2000 outside of the U.S. and Canada.

- Gotham (1988) (co-production with Phoenix Entertainment Group and Keith Addis & Associates)
- Last Light (1993)
- Attack of the 5 Ft. 2 In. Women (1994)
- Next Door (1994) (co-production with TriStar Television)
- End of Summer (1995)
- The Man in the Attic (1995) (co-production with CBS Productions)
- Zooman (1995)
- The Wharf Rat (1995)
- Bloodknot (1995)
- The Courtyard (1995)
- Full Body Massage (1995)
- Favorite Deadly Sins (1995)
- Out There (1995)
- Triplecross (1995)
- Ruby Jean and Joe (1996)
- Conundrum (1996)
- Boxing: A Different Look (1996)
- Undertow (1996)
- Mr. and Mrs. Loving (1996)
- Sabrina the Teenage Witch (1996) (co-production with Viacom Productions)
- Homecoming (A1996)
- Moonshine Highway (1996)
- The Legend of Gator Face (1996)
- Robin of Locksley (1996)
- Losing Chase (1996)
- Gang in Blue (1996)
- Annie O (1996)
- The Halfback of Notre Dame (1996)
- Amanda and the Alien (1996)
- Money Plays (1996)
- Mandela and de Klerk (1997)
- Riot (1997)
- North Shore Fish (1997)
- Elvis Meets Nixon (1997)
- The Right Connections (1997) (co-production with Viacom Productions)
- Color of Justice (1997)
- The Westing Game (1997)
- Face Down (1997)
- Woman Undone (1997)
- Tricks (1997)
- Twists of Terror (1997) (co-production with Filmline International and The Movie Network)
- The Defenders: Choices of Evils (1998) (co-production with Paramount Television)
- The Tiger Woods Story (1998) (co-production with Paramount Television and Stu Segall Productions)
- In The Doghouse (1998) (co-production with Viacom Productions, Once and Future Films and Shaken Not Stirred Productions)
- Aldrich Ames: Traitor Within (1998) (co-production with Paramount Television)
- The Defenders: Taking the First (1999) (co-production with Paramount Television)
- Noriega: God's Favorite (2000) (co-production with Regency Enterprises)
- Rated X (May 13, 2000)
- Harlan County War (2000)
- A House Divided (2000) (co-production with Paramount Television)
- The Thin Blue Lie (2000) (co-production with Paramount Television)
- Possessed (2000)
- Warden of Red Rock (2001) (co-production with Viacom Productions)
- My Horrible Year! (2001) (co-production with Paramount Television)
- The Wilde Girls (2001) (co-production with Viacom Productions)
- My Beautiful Son (2001) (co-production with Granada Entertainment)
- The Day Reagan Was Shot (2001) (co-production with Paramount Television)
- Keep the Faith, Baby (2002)
- 10,000 Black Men Named George (2002) (co-production with Paramount Television)
- Bobbie's Girl (2002) (co-production with Paramount Television)
- Sightings: Heartland Ghost (2002) (co-production with Paramount Television)
- Carry Me Home (2003)
- Just Another Story (2003)
- The Mudge Boy (2003)
- Baadasssss! (2004)
- Bereft (2004)
- Dirt (2004)
- Fathers and Sons (2004)
- Sexual Life (2004)
- Speak (2004)
- The Best Thief in the World (2004)
- Paradise (2004)
- Sucker Free City (2004)
- Hate (2004)
- Pryor Offenses (2004; pilot)
- After Innocence (2005) (co-production with Showtime Documentary Films and American Film Foundation)
- Our Fathers (2005) (co-production with Dan Curits Productions)
- Mario Cantone: Laugh Whore (2005)
- The Good Humor Man (2005)
- Same Sex America (2006) (co-production with Corra Films and K2 Pictures)
- Home Front (2006) (co-production with Looking Glass Films and Swirl Productions)
- Shame (2007)
- Semper Fi: One Man's Journey (2007)
- In Pot We Trust (2007)
- A Game of Honor (2011)
- The Vatican: The Pope's Slippers (2013) (pilot; co-production with Sony Pictures Television)
- Steve-O: Guilty as Charged (2016)
- W. Kamau Bell: Semi-Promenint Nergo (2016) (co-production with Comedy Dynamics and Yeah Dude Productions)
- Trumped (2017) (co-production with Left/Right Productions)
- Nick Cannon: Stand Up, Don't Shoot (2017) (co-production with Comedy Dynamics and Ncredible Entertainment)
- Disgraced (2017)
- Al Madrigal: Shrimpin' Ain't Easy (2017) (co-production with Irwin Entertainment)
- Tim & Faith: Soul2Soul (2017) (co-production with Magical Elves Productions)
- American Dream/American Knightmare (2018) (co-production with Mythology Entertainment and Fuqua Films)
- Queen Fur (2018) (pilot; co-production with Sony Pictures Television)
- XY Chelsea (2019) (co-production with Showtime Documentary Films, British Film Institute, 19340 Productions, Diamond Docs, Faliro House Productions, Field of Vision, Pulse Films and Topic Studios)
- Quiet Storm: The Ron Artest Story (2019) (co-production with Showtime Documentary Films, Bleacher Report, CMD Productions and Jvarta)
- Ready for War (2019) (co-production with Showtime Documentary Films, Cedar Park Entertainment, Dreamcrew, Prettybird, North of Now Group and Entertainment One)
- Matt Rogers: Have You Ever Heard About Christmas (2022) (co-production with Rotten Science)

====== Showtime Documentary Films ======
- After Innocence (2005) (co-production with Showtime Networks and American Film Foundation)
- Home Front (2006) (co-production with Showtime Networks, Looking Glass Films and Swirl Productions)
- American Jihad (2017)
- XY Chelsea (2019) (co-production with Showtime Networks, British Film Institute, 19340 Productions, Diamond Docs, Faliro House Productions, Field of Vision, Pulse Films and Topic Studios)
- Quiet Storm: The Ron Artest Story (2019) (co-production with Showtime Networks, Bleacher Report, CMD Productions and Jvarta)
- Ready for War (2019) (co-production with Showtime Networks, Cedar Park Entertainment, Dreamcrew, Prettybird, North of Now Group and Entertainment One)

===== Nickelodeon Productions =====
- Wild Rides (1982)
- UFO Kidnapped (1983) (co-production with Carleton Productions)
- School Stories From Famous People (1986)
- Nick's Thanksgiving Fest (November 22, 1989)
- Nickelodeon Studios Opening Day Celebration (1990)
- Tales From The Whoop: Hot Rod Brown, Class Clown (October 20, 1990)
- Stories from Growing Up (February 23, 1991) (co-production with Think Entertainment)
- Letters to the Earth (1993)
- The Big Help-a-thon (1994–1998)
- Those Nick at Nite Promos: 10 Years of Better Living Through Television (1995)
- Road to the Extreme Arena: Behind the Scenes of Global GUTS (1995)
- "Oh Brother" Starring Stick Stickly (1995)
- Nickelodeon Sports Theater with Shaquille O'Neal (1996–1999)
- "Stuck" Starring Stick Stickly (1997)
- Good Burger: On the Job with Kenan & Kel (1997)
- Nickellennium (2000)
- Nick GAS All-Star Party (2000)
- What Sparks You? (2000)
- Nick GAS NFL Special (2000)
- Cry Baby Lane (2000)
- Blue's Big Musical Movie (2000)
- Global GAS (2001)
- The Maximum Rocket Power Games (2002)
- R U All That?: Funniest Kid in America Grand Finale (2003)
- Let's Just Play (2003–2004; 2006–2007)
- The Nick@Nite Holiday Special (2003)
- The Pickles: Behind the Picking (2004)
- Rugrats Tales from the Crib: Snow White (2005)
- Search for the Funniest Mom in America (2005)
- Avatar: The Legend So Far (2005)
- Rugrats Tales from the Crib: Three Jacks & The Beanstalk (2006)
- Behind the Clues: 10 Years of Blue (2006)
- Deep Inside the KCAs (2007)
- Shredderman Rules (2007)
- Shredderman Rules: Behind the Scenes (2007)
- Behind the Scenes of The Last Day of Summer (2007)
- The Last Day of Summer (2007)
- Avatar: The Legend Continues (2007)
- SpongeBob's Atlantis SquarePantis (2007)
- Behind the Pantis: How We Made Atlantis SquarePantis (2007)
- Bring On the Nominees (2008)
- KCA Best of the Mess (2008–2009)
- Nickelodeon HALO Awards (2009–2017)
- Nickelodeon Kids' Choice Sports (2014–2019)
- SpongeBob's Big Birthday Blowout (2019)

==== Warner Bros. Television Studios ====
- Crosscurrent (1971)
- Probe (1972) (co-production with Leslie Stevens Productions)
- The Eyes of Charles Sand (1972)
- Climb An Angry Mountain (1972)
- Genesis II (1973) (co-production with Norway Productions)
- The Third Girl from the Left (1973)
- Deliver Us from Evil (1973)
- Cry Rape! (1973) (co-production with Leonard Freeman Productions)
- Key West (1973)
- Smile Jenny, You're Dead (1974)
- Wonder Woman (1974)
- Sidekicks (1974) (co-production with Cherokee Productions)
- Planet Earth (1974)
- The Healers (1974)
- The F.B.I. Story: The FBI Versus Alvin Karpis, Public Enemy Number One (1974) (co-production with Quinn Martin Productions)
- Attack on Terror: The FBI vs. the Ku Klux Klan (1975) (co-production with Quinn Martin Productions)
- Search for the Gods (1975) (co-production with The Douglas S. Cramer Company)
- Black Bart (1975)
- Death Among Friends (1975) (co-production with The Douglas S. Cramer Company)
- Strange New World (1975)
- Brinks: The Great Robbery (1976) (co-production with Quinn Martin Productions)
- Panache (1976)
- The Dark Side of Innocence (1976)
- Mayday at 40,000 Feet! (1976) (co-production with Andrew J. Fenady Productions)
- Bugs and Daffy's Carnival of the Animals (1976)
- Flood! (1976)
- The Possessed (1977)
- Fire! (1977) (co-production with Irwin Allen Productions)
- Bugs Bunny's Howl-oween Special (1977) (co-production with DePatie–Freleng Enterprises)
- Bugs Bunny in King Arthur's Court (1978) (co-production with Chuck Jones Productions)
- A Death in Canaan (1978) (co-production with Chris/Rose Productions)
- The Return of Captain Nemo (1978) (co-production with Irwin Allen Productions)
- The New Maverick (1978) (co-production with Cherokee Productions)
- Zuma Beach (1978) (co-production with Bruce Cohn Curtis Films Ltd. and Edgar J. Scherick Associates)
- Katie: Portrait of a Centerfold (1978) (co-production with Moonlight Productions)
- Thou Shalt Not Commit Adultery (1978) (co-production with Edgar J. Scherick Productions)
- How Bugs Bunny Won the West (1978)
- The Pirate (1978) (co-production with Howard W. Koch Productions)
- Someone's Watching Me! (1978)
- Champions: A Love Story (1979)
- The Corn Is Green (1979)
- Hanging by a Thread (1979) (co-production with Irwin Allen Productions)
- You Can't Take It with You (1979)
- Dummy (1979) (co-production with The Königsberg Company)
- Bugs Bunny's Thanksgiving Diet (1979)
- Friendships, Secrets and Lies (1979) (co-production with W/R – Wittman/Riche Productions)
- The Memory of Eva Ryker (1980) (co-production with Irwin Allen Productions)
- Haywire (1980) (co-production with Pando Productions)
- This Year's Blonde (1980)
- Daffy Duck's Easter Show (1980) (co-production with DePatie-Freleng Enterprises)
- Bugs Bunny's Bustin' Out All Over (1980) (co-production with Chuck Jones Enterprises)
- The Scarlett O'Hara War (1980) (co-production with David L. Wolper-Stan Margulies Productions)
- Fun and Games (1980) (co-production with The Kainn-Gallo Company)
- The Women's Room (1980)
- The Bugs Bunny Mystery Special (1980)
- Daffy Duck's Thanks-for-Giving Special (1980)
- Crazy Times (1981)
- Scruples (1981) (co-production with Lou Step Productions)
- Don't Look Back: The Story of Leroy 'Satchel' Paige (1981) (co-production with Satie Productions Ltd., TBA Productions Inc. and Triseme)
- Fly Away Home (1981) (co-production with An Lac Productions)
- Bugs Bunny: All-American Hero (1981)
- Golden Gate (1981) (co-production with Lin Bolen Productions)
- Sidney Shorr: A Girl's Best Friend (1981) (co-production with Hajeno Productions)
- A Few Days in Weasel Creek (1981) (co-production with Hummingbird Productions)
- Splendor in the Grass (1981) (co-production with Katz-Gallin Productions and Half-Pint Productions)
- The Marva Collins Story (1981) (co-production with Hallmark Hall of Fame Productions and NRW Features)
- The Children Nobody Wanted (1981) (co-production with Blatt-Singer Productions)
- Bugs Bunny's Mad World of Television (1982)
- Murder Is Easy (1982) (co-production with CBS Entertainment Production and David L. Wolper-Stan Margulies Productions)
- Victims (1982) (co-production with Hajeno Productions)
- The Long Summer of George Adams (1982)
- Divorce Wars: A Love Story (1982)
- Thou Shalt Not Kill (1982) (co-production with Edgar J. Scherick Associates)
- The Kid with the Broken Halo (1982) (co-production with Satellite Productions and Zephyr Productions)
- The Letter (1982) (co-production with Hajeno Productions)
- Bare Essence (1982)
- Missing Children: A Mother's Story (1982) (co-production with Kayden/Gleason)
- The Night the Bridge Fell Down (1983) (co-production with Irwin Allen Productions)
- V: The Original Miniseries (1983) (co-production with Kenneth Johnson Productions)
- Cave-In! (1983) (co-production with Irwin Allen Productions)
- Sparkling Cyanide (1983)
- A Caribbean Mystery (1983)
- Found Money (1983) (co-production with Cypress Point Productions)
- V: The Final Battle (1984) (co-production with Blatt-Singer Productions)
- The Mystic Warrior (1984)
- No Man's Land (1984)
- Goldie and the Bears (1984)
- His Mistress (1984)
- The Bad Seed (1985) (co-production with Hajeno Productions)
- Murder with Mirrors (1985)
- Midas Valley (1985) (co-production with Edward S. Feldman Company)
- Thirteen at Dinner (1985)
- Between the Darkness and the Dawn (1985) (co-production with Doris Quinlan Productions and Entheos Unlimited Productions)
- Looney Tunes 50th Anniversary (1986) (co-production with Broadway Video)
- Dead Man's Folly (1986)
- Kung Fu: The Movie (1986) (co-production with Lou Step Productions)
- Dallas: The Early Years (1986) (co-production with Lorimar Television and Roundelay Productions)
- Killer in the Mirror (1986) (co-production with Litke/Grossbart Productions)
- Northstar (1986) (co-production with Daniel Grodnik Productions and Clyde Philips Productions)
- Murder in Three Acts (1986)
- Of Pure Blood (1986)
- Promise (1986) (co-production with Garner-Duchow Productions and Hallmark Hall of Fame Productions)
- The Betty Ford Story (1987) (co-production with David L. Wolper Productions)
- Nutcracker: Money, Madness & Murder (1987) (co-production with Green Arrow Productions)
- The Spirit (1987) (co-production with De Souza Productions and Von Zerneck-Samuels Productions)
- Napoleon and Josephine: A Love Story (1987) (co-production with David L. Wolper Productions)
- What Price Victory (1988) (co-production with David L. Wolper Productions)
- The Town Bully (1988) (co-production with Dick Clark Productions)
- Roots: The Gift (1988) (co-production with David L. Wolper Productions)
- Bugs vs. Daffy: Battle of the Music Video Stars (1988)
- The Man in the Brown Suit (1989) (co-production with Alan Shayne Productions)
- Bugs Bunny's Wild World of Sports (1989)
- My Name Is Bill W. (1989) (co-production with Garner-Duchow Productions and Hallmark Hall of Fame Productions)
- The Plot to Kill Hitler (1990)
- Murder in Mississippi (1990)
- Forbidden Nights (1990) (co-production with Tristine Rainer Productions)
- The Face of Fear (1990)
- Happy Birthday, Bugs!: 50 Looney Years (1990) (co-production with Smith-Hemion Productions)
- A Promise to Keep (1990) (co-production with Elliot Friedgen & Company & Sacret)
- When You Remember Me (1990)
- To My Daughter (1990) (co-production with Zacs Productions and Nugget Entertainment)
- Dillinger (1991) (co-production with David L. Wolper Productions)
- Bugs Bunny's Overtures to Disaster (1991)
- Babe Ruth (1991) (co-production with Elliot Friedgen & Company)
- Prisoner of Honor (1991) (co-production with Dreyfuss / James Productions and Etude)
- Survive the Savage Sea (1992) (co-production with Von Zerneck-Sertner Films)
- Taking Back My Life: The Nancy Ziegenmeyer Story (1992) (co-production with Elliot Friedgen & Company and Lytte Heshty Production)
- A House of Secrets and Lies (1992) (co-production with Chris/Rose Productions and Elliot Friedgen & Company)
- Empire City (1992)
- The Sands of Time (1992) (co-production with Dove Audio)
- Condition: Critical (1992) (co-production with Toots Productions)
- Killer Rules (1993) (co-production with Lee Rich Company)
- The Flood: Who Will Save Our Children? (1993) (co-production with Wolper Productions and Film Queensland)
- I'll Fly Away: Then and Now (1993) (co-production with Brand/Falsey Productions)
- No Child of Mine (1993) (co-production with Bonnie Raskin Productions and Green/Epstein Productions)
- Fatal Deception: Mrs. Lee Harvey Oswald (1993) (co-production with Elliot Friedgen & Company, David L. Wolper Productions and Bernard Sofronski Productions)
- Attack of the 50 Ft. Woman (1993)
- A Cool Like That Christmas (1993)
- Lies of the Heart: The Story of Laurie Kellogg (1994) (co-production with MDT Productions and Daniel H. Blatt Productions)
- Beyond Obsession (1994)
- Where Are My Children (1994) (co-production with Andrea Baynes Productions)
- The Innocent (1994) (co-production with Grammnet Productions)
- Someone She Knows (1994)
- Beyond Betrayal (1994) (co-production with Daniel H. Blatt Productions)
- Without Warning (1994) (co-production with The Wolper Organization and Mountain View Productions)
- How the West Was Fun (1994) (co-production with Dualstar Productions, Green/Epstein Productions and Kicking Horse Productions Ltd.)
- Because Mommy Works (1994) (co-production with Spring Creek Productions)
- Spenser: The Judas Goat (1994) (co-production with ABC Cable & International Broadcast Inc., Boardwalk Entertainment and Protocol Entertainment)
- A Walton Wedding (1995) (co-production with Amanda Productions, Eagle Point Production and The Lee Rich Company)
- Young at Heart (1995) (co-production with TS Productions)
- Virtual Seduction (1995)
- Divas (1995) (co-production with CBS Productions and The Thomas Carter Company)
- Prince for a Day (1995) (co-production with The Wolper Organization)
- It Was Him or Us (1995) (co-production with MDT Productions)
- The Thorn Birds: The Missing Years (1996) (co-production with The Wolper Organization and Village Roadshow Pictures Television)
- A Brother's Promise: The Dan Jansen Story (1996)
- Sins of Silence (1996) (co-production with Daniel H. Blatt Productions)
- Radiant City (1996) (co-production with Witt/Thomas Productions)
- Never Give Up: The Jimmy V Story (1996) (co-production with Daniel H. Blatt Productions and Sports Illustrated Television)
- Kidz in the Wood (1996) (co-production with Green/Epstein Productions and Pacific Motion Pictures)
- Once You Meet a Stranger (1996) (co-production with Michael Filerman Productions)
- Blue Rodeo (1996) (co-production with Lakeside Productions and The Paul Lussier Company)
- Dallas: J.R. Returns (1996) (co-production with Eagle Paint Production and Olive Productions)
- Childhood Sweetheart? (1997) (co-production with Daniel H. Blatt Productions and Lakeside Productions)
- The Dukes of Hazzard: Reunion! (1997) (co-production with Kudzu Productions)
- Knots Landing: Back to the Cul-de-Sac (1997)
- A Walton Easter (1997) (co-production with Eagle Point Production)
- Dallas: War of the Ewings (1998) (co-production with Lakeside Productions)
- Blade Squad (1998) (co-production with H. Beale Company)
- Babylon 5: The River of Souls (1998)
- Babylon 5: Thirdspace (1998)
- Border Line (1999) (co-production with Aviator Films)
- Fail Safe (2000) (co-production with Maysville Pictures)
- The Dukes of Hazzard: Hazzard in Hollywood (2000) (co-production with Kudzu Productions)
- Witchblade (2000) (co-production with Halsted Pictures, Image Comics, Mythic Films and Top Cow Productions)
- Shadow Realm (2002) (co-production with Angel/Brown Productions)
- The Big Time (2002) (co-production with John Wells Productions)
- The Lone Ranger (2003) (co-production with Turner Television)
- Evil Never Dies (2003) (co-production with Coote Hayes Productions and The Wolper Organization)
- L.A. Confidential (2003) (co-production with Regency Television and The Wolper Organization)
- Christmas Vacation 2: Cousin Eddie's Island Adventure (2003) (co-production with Elliot Friedgan & Company and National Lampoon)
- The Goodbye Girl (2004) co-production with TNT)
- Helter Skelter (2004) (co-production with Lakeside Productions and Wolper Organization)
- Growing Pains: Return of the Seavers (2004) (co-production with Green-Epstein-Bacino Productions)
- Samantha: An American Girl Holiday (2004) (co-production with Red Om Films, Revolution Studios and Sam Films)
- Dallas Reunion: The Return to Southfork (2004) (co-production with Henry Winkler/Michael Levitt Productions)
- Snow Wonder (2005) (co-production with The Wolper Organization and Without Santa LLC)
- Felicity: An American Girl Adventure (2005) (co-production with Revolution Studios, Red Om Films and American Girl)
- Knots Landing Reunion: Together Again (2005) (co-production with Henry Winkler/Michael Levitt Productions)
- Avenger (2006) (co-production with TNT, Radiant Productions and Appledown Films Inc.)
- Aquaman (2006)
- Molly: An American Girl on the Home Front (2006) (co-production with American Girl, Red Om Films and Revolution Studios)
- The Year Without a Santa Claus (2006) (co-production with The Wolper Organization)
- Sybil (2007) (co-production with Norman Stephen Productions and Wolper Organization)
- Poison Ivy: The Secret Society (2008) (co-production with CineTel Films, Insight Film Studios and New Line Cinema)
- Innocent (2011) (co-production with Frank von Zerneck Films and Mike Robe Productions)
- Dolly Parton's Christmas of Many Colors: Circle of Love (2016) (co-production with Dixie Pixie Productions and Magnolia Hill Productions)
- Hairspray Live! (2016) (co-production with New Line Cinema, Sony Pictures Television, Storyline Entertainment and Universal Television)
- The Bad Seed (2018) (co-production with Front Street Pictures, Lifetime, Loweprofile, The Wolper Organization and Warner Horizon Unscripted Television)
- Critters Attack! (2019) (co-production with Blue Ribbon Content and New Line Cinema)
- The Waltons: Homecoming (2021) (co-production with Magnolia Hill Productions)
- The Waltons: Thanksgiving (2022) (co-production with Magnolia Hill Productions)
- Dolly Parton's Mountain Magic Christmas (2022) (co-production with Sandollar Productions and Magnolia Hill Productions)

===== Warner Horizon Unscripted Television =====
- A Christmas Story Live! (2017) (co-production with Marc Platt Productions and Turner Entertainment Co.)
- A West Wing Special to Benefit When We All Vote (2020) (co-production with Casey Patterson Entertainment and Shoe Money Productions)
- The Fresh Prince of Bel-Air Reunion (2020) (co-production with Westbrook)
- Friends: The Reunion (2021) (co-production with Bright/Kaufmann/Crane Productions and Fulwell 73 Productions)
- Scooby-Doo, Where Are You Now! (2021) (co-production with Warner Bros. Animation, Hanna-Barbera Cartoons and Abominable Pictures)
- Harry Potter 20th Anniversary: Return to Hogwarts (2021) (co-production with Casey Patterson Entertainment and Pulse Films)

===== Lorimar Television =====
- Aesop Fables (1971)
- The Crooked Hearts (1972)
- The Girls of Huntington House (1973)
- Dying Room Only (1973)
- Don't Be Afraid of the Dark (1973)
- The Blue Knight (1973)
- A Dream for Christmas (1973)
- The Stranger Within (1974)
- Bad Ronald (1974)
- The Runaway Barge (1975)
- The Runaways (1975)
- Returning Home (1975)
- Eric (1975)
- Conspiracy of Terror (1975)
- Widow (1976)
- Green Eyes (1977)
- The Prince of Central Park (1977)
- Killer on Board (1977)
- A Question of Guilt (1978)
- Desperate Women (1978)
- Long Journey Back (1978)
- Some Kind of Miracle (1979)
- Mr. Horn (1979)
- Marriage Is Alive and Well (1980)
- The Waltons: A Decade of the Waltons (1980)
- Reward (1980)
- A Perfect Match (1980)
- Rape and Marriage: The Rideout Case (1980)
- A Matter of Life and Death (1981)
- Our Family Business (1981)
- Mistress of Paradise (1981)
- Killjoy (1981)
- Washington Mistress (1982)
- A Wedding on Walton's Mountain (1982)
- Desperate Lives (1982)
- Mother's Day on Waltons Mountain (1982)
- This Is Kate Bennett.. (1982)
- Two of a Kind (1982)
- Johnny Belinda (1982)
- One Shoe Makes It Murder (1982)
- A Day for Thanks on Walton's Mountain (1982)
- Pajama Tops (1983)
- One Cooks, the Other Doesn't (1983)
- An Uncommon Love (1983)
- The Winter of Our Discontent (1983)
- Why Me? (1984)
- Spraggue (1984)
- Gulag (1985)
- Deadly Intentions (1985)
- Master Harold...and the Boys (1985)
- Blood & Orchids (1986)
- Dallas: The Early Years (1986)
- The Deliberate Stranger (1986)
- Circle of Violence: A Family Drama (1986)
- Love Among Thieves (1987)
- Shattered Innocence (1988)
- Glitz (1988)
- Desperate for Love (1989)
- The Outside Woman (1989)
- An Eight Is Enough Wedding (1989)
- Burning Bridges (1990)
- Hollywood Dog (1990)
- Deadly Intentions... Again? (1991)
- For the Very First Time (1991)
- Doublecrossed (1991)
- A Mother's Justice (1991)
- O Pioneers! (1992)
- Miss Rose White (1992)
- To Grandmother's House We Go (1992)
- A Killer Among Friends (1992)
- Just Mt Imagination (1992)
- Bloodlines: Murder in the Family (1993)
- Men Don't Tell (1993)
- Black Widow Murders: The Blanche Taylor Moore Story (1993)
- There Was a Little Boy (1993)
- A Walton Thanksgiving Reunion (1993)
- Island City (1994)

=== CBS News ===
- National Drivers Test (1965)
- 16 in Webster Groves (1966)
- Inside Pop: The Rock Revolution (1967)
- Children of Apartheid (1987)
- Cronkite Remembers (1996)
- Demolition Day: Seattle Kingdome (2000)
- Criminal: Punks vs. Preps (2000)
- Summer of Terror: The Real Son of Sam Story (2001)
- Inside Flight 93 (2002)
- Survivor: The Reunion (2002) (co-production with Castaway Television Productions)
- Be Your Own Hero: Call to Duty (2002)
- Burning Questions (2002)
- The Horrors of Hussein (2003)
- Deadly Deception: The Mark Hacking Story (2004)
- Impossible City (2004)
- Lifeline: The Nursing Diaries (2004)
- Global Issues for Students: Africa: Challenges in the 21st Century (2004) (co-production with Schlessinger Media)
- Betrayal: The Battle for Warsaw (2005)
- CBS News on Logo: Special Report on AIDS (co-production with Logo TV)
- Hot Zips (2006)
- Dust of Dust: The Health Effects of 9/11 (2006) (co-production with Tinderbox Media Group)
- 2007: The Year In Animals (2007)
- First Arab Israeli Plane Hijacking (2007) (co-production with CBS Eye Productions)
- Killer Virus: Hunt for the Next Plague (2008)
- Collapse: When Structures Fail (2008)
- Dark Fellowships: The Vril (2008) (co-production with Silent Crow Arts)
- When Nature Strikes (2008)
- Crash: The Next Great Depression? (2008)
- New Life on Mars? (2009)
- Amatomy of a Pandemic (2009)
- The Truth About Pandemic (2009) (co-production with Silent Crow Arts)
- Understanding Ardi (2009) (co-production with Silent Crow Arts)
- The Gayle King Interview with R. Kelly (2019)
- Creating Syntheitc Life: Your Questions Answered (2010)

=== BET Networks ===
- BET Awards (2001–present)
- Celebration of Gospel (2001–2016)

=== Comedy Partners ===
- State of the Union Undressed (1992)
- This is MST3K (1992)
- Out There (1993) (co-production with English Channel)
- Out There II (1994) (co-production with English Channel)
- Out There in Hollywood (1995) (co-production with English Channel)
- Comedy del Sol (1996)
- Windy City Heat (2003) (co-production with Jackhole Productions / Dakota Pictures)
- The Hebrew Hammer (2003) (co-production with ContentFilm / Intrinsic Value Films)
- A Colbert Christmas (2008) (co-production with Spartina Productions)
- Bo Burnham: Words, Words, Words (2010) (co-production with 3 Arts Entertainment / Art & Industry)
- The Comedy Awards (2011–2012)
- Daniel Tosh: Happy Thoughts (2011) (co-production with Irwin Entertainment / Black Hearts Productions)
- Norm Macdonald: Me Doing Standup (2011) (co-production with Irwin Entertainment / Norm Macdonald Productions / Brillstein Entertainment Partners)
- 6 Days to Air (2011)
- Jo Koy: Lights Out (2011) (co-production with Art & Industry)
- Eugene! (2012) (co-production with Jax Media)
- Jeff Ross Roasts America (2012) (co-production with Enough with the Bread Already Productions / Tagline Television)
- Demetri Martin: Standup Comedian (2012) (co-production with PersonGlobal / Irwin Entertainment)
- D.L. Hughley: The Endangered List (2012) (co-production with Five Timez Productions / Kahn Miller Greenberg / 3 Arts Entertainment)
- Al Madrigal: Why Is The Rabbit Crying? (2013) (co-production with Pupcake Productions / Brillstein Entertainment Partners)
- Steve Rannazzisi: Manchild (2013) (co-production with Brillstein Entertainment Partners / Irwin Entertainment)
- Neal Brennan: Woman and Black Dudes (2014) (co-production with Neal Brennan, Inc. / Irwin Entertainment / Brillstein Entertainment Partners)
- Hannibal Buress: Live from Chicago (2014) (co-production with Big Gang Bang Birds Productions / 3 Arts Entertainment / Marshall/Raboy Productions)
- Ari Shaffir: Paid Regular (2015) (co-production with Tax Industries / Art & Industry)
- Nick Swardson: Taste It (co-production with Irwin Entertainment / Brillstein Entertainment Partners)
- Bridget Everest: Gynecological Wonder (2015) (co-production with Red Hour Productions / Beavertail Productions)
- Steve Rannazzisi: Breaking Dad (2015) (co-production with Thank You, Brain! Productions / Brillstein Entertainment Partners)
- Nikki Glasser: Perfect (2016) (co-production with Irwin Entertainment / Perfect / Convy Entertainment / Brillstein Entertainment Partners)
- Big Jay Oakerson: Live at Wembley Hall (2016) (co-production with Angry Buddha Films / ScooBADoo Productions / Jax Media)
- Roy Wood Jr.: Father Figure (2017) (co-production with Art & Industry)
- Roy Wood Jr.: Imperfect Messenger (2021) (co-production with Bob Bain Productions / Mainstay Entertainment)
- Reno 911! The Hunt for QAnon (2021) (co-production with High Sierra Carpeting)
- A Clüsterfünke Christmas (2021) (co-production with Lighthouse Pictures / Wishing Floor Films)
- Hot Mess Holiday (2021) (co-production with Gunpowder & Sky)
- South Park: The 25th Anniversary Concert (2022) (co-production with Alex Coletti Productions)
- Jeff Dunham: Me the People (2022) (co-production with Red Wire Blue Wire / Triage Entertainment)
- Out of Office (2022) (co-production with CBS Studios / Propagate Content)
- Cursed Friends (2022) (co-production with Propagate Content / Electric Avenue / Artists First)
- Reno 911! It's a Wonderful Heist (2022) (co-production with High Sierra Carpeting)
- Office Race (2023) (co-production with Above Average / Believe Entertainment Group)
- Jeff Dunham: I'm with Cupid (2024) (co-production with Red Wire Blue Wire / Triage Entertainment)

=== Paramount Network (Spike Cable Networks Inc.) ===
- Summer Splash at Walt Disney World (1998)
- Kenny Loggins: December (1999)
- Spike Video Game Awards (2003–2012)
- Scream Awards (2006–2011) (co-production with Michael Levitt Productions / Chloe Productions)
- The Hunt for Monster Sharks (2007)
- Bam's World Domination (2010) (co-production with Time Inc. Studios / Capital V Productions)
- Alternate History: Nazis Win WW2 (2011) (co-production with Flight 33 Productions)
- Dashing in December (2020) (co-production with The Ninth House)

=== Group W Productions ===
- Lost in London (1985) (co-production with Emmanuel Lewis Entertainment Enterprises, Inc. and D’Angelo Productions, Inc.)
- Mafia Princess (1986)
- Soldier Boys (1987)
- Fatal Judgement (1988)
- Gangs (1988)
- Taking a Stand (1989)

=== Paramount Pictures Corporation ===
==== DreamWorks Television ====
- Dear Diary (1996) (pilot)
- Giving Harry the Business (1996) (unaired pilot)
- Fully-Clothed, Non-Dancing Girls (1996) (unaired pilot)
- Twin Cities (1996) (unaired pilot)
- For the People (1996) (unaired pilot)
- 7:08 (1997) (unaired pilot)
- Anna Says (1998) (unaired pilot)
- The Duplex (1999) (unaired pilot)
- Sugar Hill (1999) (unaired pilot)
- We Stand Alone Together: The Men of Easy Company (2001) (co-production with Playtone and Cowen/Richter Productions for HBO)

==== Miramax Television ====
- Robinson Crusoe (1997) (co-production with RHI Entertainment)
- A Wrinkle in Time (2003) (as Dimension Television; co-production with BLT Productions and Fireworks Entertainment)
- The I Inside (2004) (as Dimension Television)

=== Paramount Television International Studios ===
- The Butcher Surgeon, Why Wasn't He Stopped? (2017)
- Wallis: The Queen That Never Was (2017)
- The Battle for Britain's Heroes (2018) (co-production with Uplands Television)
- Albert: The Power Behind Victoria (2018)
- Stephen King Master of Horror (2018)
- Meghan and the Markles: A Family at War (2019)
- When Buildings Collapse: World's Worse Engineering Disasters (2019)
- Inside the Cockpit: The Concorde Crash (2019)
- Inside Lidl at Christmas (2020)
- Aldi's Easter Secrets (2021)
- Neighbours Made Me a Star: From Ramsay St to Hollywood (2022)
- Neighbours All The Pops Hits & More (2022)
