= List of programs broadcast by Noggin =

Noggin's original logo, used from 1999 to 2009, and from 2015 to 2019

The following is a list of programs featured on Noggin, an edutaiment brand established in 1999 as a joint venture between MTV Networks' Nickelodeon and Sesame Workshop.

Noggin originated as a cable television channel, featuring dayparts targeted at preschoolers, older children and teenagers, and adult audiences, much like Nickelodeon. In April 2002, the preschool and teen-oriented dayparts were extended to last 12 hours each day, with the latter receiving its own name and branding distinct from the rest of the channel: The N.

Sesame Workshop sold its stake in Noggin in August 2002, but continued to co-produce content for the brand until 2009. That same year, the Noggin television channel was replaced by the Nick Jr. Channel, but the brand was relaunched as a streaming service in 2015. From 2020 until 2024, the Noggin streaming service produced a variety of exclusive series. The service shut down on July 2, 2024, but was relaunched in August 2025.

== Television channel (1999–2009) ==
The Noggin television channel launched on February 2, 1999, and closed on September 28, 2009. In its first three years, it targeted pre-teens and teenagers, with programming blocks aimed at young children and adults throughout its schedule. Starting on April 1, 2002, Noggin would devote 12 hours of its schedule (between 6 a.m. and 6 p.m.) to preschool programming, with the remainder occupied by The N and retaining its teen audience. On December 31, 2007, The N was spun-off into its own channel, and Noggin became fully devoted to preschoolers.

=== Original programming ===
MTV Networks and Sesame Workshop established Noggin LLC to produce original content for their network in 1999. Sesame Workshop would sell its stake in August 2002, but continued to co-produce content until 2009.

==== Daytime series ====
Title	First air date	Last air date	Source(s)
Big Kids	January 29, 2001	January 25, 2004 (during The N)	
Jack's Big Music Show	September 12, 2005	September 25, 2009	(Note: This show continued to air on the Nick Jr. Channel after it took over Noggin's channel space on September 28, 2009.)
On the Team	January 30, 2001	March 31, 2002	
Oobi	2000 (shorts); April 7, 2003 (long-form)	September 28, 2009	(Note: Previously premiered as interstitial shorts in 2000 before becoming a full-length series.)
Phred on Your Head Show	June 6, 1999	March 31, 2002	
Sponk!	September 10, 2001	February 1, 2004 (during The N)	
The Upside Down Show	October 16, 2006	September 27, 2009	(Note: Co-produced by Noggin LLC and Sesame Workshop. Both companies co-own the copyright.)
The URL with Phred Show	July 23, 2001	December 14, 2003	(Note: The URL with Phred Show was a regular part of Noggin's daytime block from July 2001 until March 2002. From then until December 2003, it aired as part of a program called "Cable in the Classroom.")
A Walk in Your Shoes	October 25, 1999 (shorts); April 30, 2000 (long-form)	December 4, 2005 (during The N)	

==== Overnight programming (The N) ====
Title	First air date	Last air date	Source(s)
Big Kids	April 1, 2002	January 25, 2004	
Girls v. Boys	August 8, 2003	January 7, 2007	
LOL with The N	May 30, 2003	June 20, 2003	
Miracle's Boys	February 18, 2005	December 31, 2007	
O'Grady	July 30, 2004	September 23, 2007	
On the Team	April 21, 2002	December 21, 2003	
Out There	May 23, 2003	January 21, 2004	
South of Nowhere	November 4, 2005	December 31, 2007	
Sponk!	April 1, 2002	February 1, 2004	
A Walk in Your Shoes	April 1, 2002	December 4, 2005	

=== Acquired programming ===
==== Daytime series ====
Title	First air date	Last air date	Source(s)
64 Zoo Lane	January 3, 2005	September 28, 2009	
Bill Nye the Science Guy	September 10, 2000	July 28, 2003 (during The N)	
Connie the Cow	September 8, 2003	March 4, 2007	(Note: Noggin/The N is named in the credits but did not directly produce the show.)
Cooking for Kids with Luis	September 26, 2005	March 2009	
Ebb and Flo	November 14, 2005	March 2009	
Miffy and Friends	April 7, 2003	October 26, 2008	
Toot & Puddle	December 13, 2006	September 25, 2009	
Tweenies	April 7, 2003	December 25, 2005	

==== The N ====
Title	First air date	Last air date	Source(s)
24Seven	April 1, 2002	January 18, 2004	
About a Girl	October 5, 2007	December 31, 2007	
Being Eve	April 1, 2002	February 15, 2004	
Best Friend's Date	December 3, 2004	December 18, 2005	
Beyond the Break	June 2, 2006	December 31, 2007	
The Best Years	June 29, 2007	September 21, 2007	
Bill Nye the Science Guy	April 1, 2002	July 27, 2003	
The Brady Bunch	March 29, 2004	April 24, 2004	
Clueless	April 4, 2003	December 31, 2007	
Dawson's Creek	August 14, 2006	December 31, 2007	
Degrassi: The Next Generation	April 1, 2002	December 31, 2007	
Degrassi Junior High/Degrassi High	October 6, 2005	May 17, 2007	
A Different World	February 24, 2007	December 31, 2007	
Girlstuff/Boystuff	May 26, 2003	September 19, 2004	
Growing Pains	May 28, 2007	December 31, 2007	
The Hills	July 30, 2007	December 9, 2007	
Instant Star	July 1, 2005	May 18, 2007	
Just Deal	January 6, 2003	December 5, 2004	
Moesha	January 1, 2005	December 31, 2007	
My So-Called Life	April 2004	March 30, 2007	
One on One	October 27, 2006	December 15, 2007	
Radio Free Roscoe	August 1, 2003	December 9, 2007	
Real Access	August 1, 2003	September 12, 2004	
Sabrina the Teenage Witch	March 1, 2004	December 31, 2007	
Summerland	May 1, 2006	December 31, 2007	
Whistler	June 30, 2006	December 5, 2007	

=== Programming from Sesame Workshop ===
Reruns of series from Sesame Workshop's content library were shown as a staple of Noggin from 1999 to 2005. Two syndication packages of Sesame Street episodes, titled Sesame Street Unpaved and 123 Sesame Street, were created specifically for Noggin.

==== Daytime series ====
Title	First air date	Last air date	Source(s)
123 Sesame Street	February 2, 1999	August 28, 2005	
3-2-1 Contact	February 2, 1999	May 21, 2003	(Note: From mid-2002 onward, the show only aired in the early morning, during time slots reserved for Cable in the Classroom.)
Cro	February 2, 1999	May 18, 2003	
The Electric Company	February 2, 1999	May 18, 2003	
Ghostwriter	February 2, 1999	2002	
The New Ghostwriter Mysteries	June 18, 2001	2002	
Pinky Dinky Doo	April 10, 2006	September 25, 2009	(Note: First broadcast as a one-episode preview on April 3, 2006.)
Play with Me Sesame	April 1, 2002	September 2, 2007	(Note: Although Nick Digital was involved in the production of the series and Viacom owns the "Play with Me" trademark, the series is still solely owned by Sesame Workshop.)
Sesame Street Unpaved	February 2, 1999	May 25, 2003	
Square One Television	February 2, 1999	May 20, 2003	
Tiny Planets	April 1, 2002	April 9, 2006	(Note: Previously premiered as interstitial shorts on April 1, 2002 before becoming a full-length series.)

==== The N ====
Title	First air date	Last air date	Source(s)
Ghostwriter	2002	May 22, 2003	
The New Ghostwriter Mysteries	2002	2003	

=== Programming from MTV and Nickelodeon ===
An asterisk (*) indicates that the program had new episodes aired on Noggin.

==== Daytime series ====
Title	First air date	Last air date	Source(s)
Allegra's Window	February 2, 1999	February 2, 2003	
The Backyardigans*	November 22, 2004	September 27, 2009	
Blue's Clues	February 2, 1999	September 27, 2009	
Blue's Room	August 2, 2004	February 14, 2009	
Dora the Explorer*	April 7, 2003	September 27, 2009	
Doug	February 2, 1999	March 31, 2002	
Eureeka's Castle	February 2, 1999	September 8, 2000	
The Fresh Beat Band	August 30, 2009	September 6, 2009	-
Go, Diego, Go!	August 22, 2005	September 27, 2009	(Note: The series aired first on Noggin as a sneak peek before eventually premiering on Nickelodeon a month later on September 6, 2005.)
Gullah Gullah Island	February 2, 1999	September 28, 2009	
Little Bill	September 10, 2007	September 27, 2009	
Ni Hao, Kai-Lan	August 10, 2008	September 28, 2009	
Nick News	February 2, 1999	March 31, 2002	
Oswald	April 7, 2003	September 25, 2009	(Note: Co-produced by Nickelodeon Animation Studio and HIT Entertainment. Both companies co-own the copyright.)
Wild Side Show	February 2, 1999	March 31, 2002	
Wonder Pets!*	March 3, 2006	September 27, 2009	

==== The N ====
Title	First air date	Last air date	Source(s)
The Adventures of Pete & Pete	April 1, 2002	2003	
The Amanda Show	October 13, 2007	December 29, 2007	
Caitlin's Way	January 24, 2003	2007	
Clarissa Explains It All	April 1, 2002	2004	
Daria	July 2, 2002	June 3, 2006	
The Hills	July 30, 2007	December 9, 2007	
iCarly	September 8, 2007		
Just Jordan	January 16, 2007	December 31, 2007	
Kenan & Kel	October 13, 2007	December 30, 2007	
Laguna Beach: The Real Orange County	July 2, 2007	December 8, 2007	
The Naked Brothers Band	October 2, 2007	December 2007	
The Nick Cannon Show	June 14, 2003	July 3, 2003	
The Secret World of Alex Mack	January 24, 2003	June 13, 2003	
Unfabulous	December 2, 2006	December 15, 2007	
Zoey 101	June 4, 2007	December 11, 2007	

=== Acquired programming from MTV and Nickelodeon ===
==== Daytime series ====
Title	First air date	Last air date	Source(s)
Bob the Builder	April 7, 2003	December 25, 2004	
The Busy World of Richard Scarry	January 3, 2000	September 7, 2001	(Note: Nickelodeon is named in the credits, but Nickelodeon's studios did not produce the show.)
Franklin	October 4, 1999	September 25, 2009	
Holly Hobbie & Friends (specials)	December 22, 2006	2007	(Note: Although Nickelodeon Animation Studios was involved in the production of the series, the series is solely owned by American Greetings.)
Kipper	January 29, 2001	March 7, 2003	
LazyTown	November 22, 2004	September 28, 2009	
Little Bear	September 10, 2001	September 28, 2009	
Maggie and the Ferocious Beast	April 7, 2003	September 28, 2009	
Maisy	January 29, 2001	November 11, 2007	
Max & Ruby	August 16, 2004	September 27, 2009	
Miss Spider's Sunny Patch Friends	November 22, 2004	September 27, 2009	
Rubbadubbers	May 31, 2004	November 28, 2004	
Olivia*	February 1, 2009	September 27, 2009	
Wow! Wow! Wubbzy!*	August 21, 2006	September 28, 2009	
Yo Gabba Gabba!*	August 20, 2007	September 27, 2009	

==== The N ====
Title	First air date	Last air date	Source(s)
The Fresh Prince of Bel-Air	October 3, 2004	December 31, 2007	

=== Short-form programming ===
Title	Premiere date	End date	Source(s)
And Then What Happened?	April 1, 2002	April 6, 2003	
Art Alive	April 7, 2003	September 28, 2009	
Arts and Crafts	2007	September 28, 2009	
Bedtime Business	2008	September 28, 2009	
The Big Green Help	April 22, 2008	September 28, 2009	
Brain Food: Nick's Kid Almanac	February 2, 1999	March 31, 2002	
Bugsy and Herbie	February 2, 1999	2000	
Critter Corner	April 7, 2003	September 28, 2009	
Deja Noggin	February 2, 1999	March 31, 2002	
Field Trip	April 7, 2003	September 28, 2009	
Getting Going	2009	September 28, 2009	
The Girl With Her Head Coming Off	February 2, 1999	March 31, 2002	
Head Buzzers	February 2, 1999	March 31, 2002	
I Am Poem	1999	March 31, 2002	
Inside Out Boy	February 2, 1999	March 31, 2002	
Just Wondering	June 2001	September 2001	
Let's Do Math: Bruno	August 2005	September 2009	
Letter and Number Soup: Max and His Alphabet Adventures	February 2, 1999	March 31, 2002	
Looking at Each Other	February 2, 1999	March 31, 2002	
Me in a Box	2000	March 31, 2002	
Moose and Zee	April 7, 2003	September 28, 2009	
Move to the Music	April 7, 2003	September 28, 2009	
My Wacky Family	February 2, 1999	March 31, 2002	
Noggin Boogie: Jungle Boogie; Nick Jr. Presents Blue's Big Musical Movie; Nick Jr. Sings; The Space Between Mr. Frear's Ears	February 2, 1999	March 31, 2002	
Noggin Gold	February 2, 1999	March 31, 2002	
Noggin's Neighbors: Nanalan'; What's the Buzz with Philomena Fly; Winky Love	February 2, 1999	March 31, 2002	
Noggin Presents: Ask Mother Nature	February 2, 1999	March 31, 2002	
Noggin Presents: Chickiepoo and Fluff: Barnyard Detectives; Peppa Pig	2007	September 28, 2009	
Noggin's Thoughts	February 2, 1999	March 31, 2002	
Noggin Knows U Know	2000	March 31, 2002	
Noggin Wants to Know	February 2, 1999	2000	
Nogginoid	February 2, 1999	March 31, 2002	
A Nogginy Moment	February 2, 1999	2000	
Noggolution	February 2, 1999	March 31, 2002	
Oobi	2000	2007	
Out of Your Mind: Nick Jr. Show and Tell; Short Films by Short People	February 2, 1999	March 31, 2002	
Sesame Street Hits	February 2, 1999	March 31, 2002	
Show and Tell	April 7, 2003	September 28, 2009	
A Show of Hands	February 2, 1999	March 31, 2002	
Snack Time: Cooking for Kids with Luis	September 26, 2005	March 2009	
Story Time	April 7, 2003	September 28, 2009	
Think Loudly: Nickellennium (excerpts)	2000	March 31, 2002	
What's In Heidi's Head?	1999	2000	
What Sparks You?	February 2, 1999	March 31, 2002	
The Whooton Observer	February 2, 1999	March 31, 2002	
Your Noggin's Choice	1999	2000	
Zee's Bookshelf: Ebb and Flo	November 2005	March 2009	
Zee's Garden: Little Green Fingers	2008	2009	

== Streaming service (2015–2024) ==
Logo used from 2019 to 2024.

In March 2015, the Noggin brand was relaunched as a video-on-demand streaming app. It featured shows from the original Noggin channel as well as some exclusive shows and currently-running series from Nickelodeon's library. The service was active until July 2, 2024.

=== Original programming ===
Title	Added	Removed
Balloon Builders	February 27, 2022	July 2, 2024
Dance Squad with Ailey	April 30, 2023	July 2, 2024
Jack's Big Music Show	April 8, 2015	April 30, 2020
Kinderwood	December 3, 2020	July 2, 2024
Moose and Zee interstitials	March 4, 2015	July 2, 2024
Noggin Knows	January 4, 2021	July 2, 2024
The Noggins	January 31, 2021	July 2, 2024
Oobi	May 6, 2015	April 30, 2020
School of Yum	November 12, 2020	July 2, 2024
Story Time	March 4, 2015	July 2, 2024
Troop Dragonfly	June 11, 2023	July 2, 2024
The Upside Down Show	March 4, 2015	April 30, 2020
Yoga Friends	February 18, 2020	July 2, 2024

=== Acquired programming ===
Title	Added	Removed
Bob Books	December 2, 2019	July 2, 2024
Frankie & Frank	April 3, 2020	July 2, 2024
JoJo & Gran Gran	June 14, 2021	July 2, 2024
Miffy and Friends	September 28, 2016	April 30, 2020
Mofy	November 2, 2016	September 30, 2018
Numberblocks	July 26, 2021	July 2, 2024
Play Along with Sam	October 5, 2016	September 30, 2018
Pocoyo Planet	April 6, 2016	June 30, 2019
Teletubbies (classic series)	May 25, 2016	April 30, 2020
Tot Cop	September 3, 2019	July 2, 2024
Trucktown	January 10, 2017	September 30, 2018
Twirlywoos	May 24, 2017	April 30, 2020

=== Programming from Nickelodeon ===
Title	Added	Removed
Allegra's Window	March 4, 2015	April 30, 2020
Baby Shark's Big Show!	March 1, 2021	July 2, 2024
The Backyardigans	June 17, 2015	July 2, 2024
Blaze and the Monster Machines	May 31, 2017	July 2, 2024
Blue's Clues	March 4, 2015	July 2, 2024
Blue's Clues & You!	October 16, 2019	July 2, 2024
Blue's Room	March 4, 2015	April 30, 2020
Bubble Guppies	May 31, 2017	July 2, 2024
Dora and Friends: Into the City!	August 7, 2019	July 2, 2024
Dora the Explorer	August 31, 2017	July 2, 2024
Face's Music Party	June 7, 2022	July 2, 2024
The Fresh Beat Band	November 7, 2018	July 2, 2024
Fresh Beat Band of Spies	June 24, 2019	July 2, 2024
Go, Diego, Go!	November 18, 2015	July 2, 2024
Gullah Gullah Island	March 4, 2015	April 30, 2020
Mutt & Stuff	September 11, 2019	July 2, 2024
Nella the Princess Knight	October 9, 2019	July 2, 2024
Ni Hao, Kai-Lan	March 4, 2015	July 2, 2024
Oswald	March 4, 2015	April 30, 2020
Robot and Monster	March 4, 2015	September 30, 2018
Santiago of the Seas	September 28, 2020	July 2, 2024
Shimmer and Shine	June 24, 2019	July 2, 2024
Sunny Day	August 7, 2019	July 2, 2024
Team Umizoomi	May 31, 2017	July 2, 2024
Wallykazam!	June 6, 2018	July 2, 2024
Wonder Pets!	July 6, 2016	July 2, 2024
Zoofari	September 11, 2019	July 2, 2024

=== Acquired programming from Nickelodeon ===
Title	Added	Removed
Abby Hatcher	October 23, 2019	July 2, 2024
The Adventures of Paddington	May 10, 2021	July 2, 2024
Becca's Bunch	September 25, 2019	September 6, 2021
Canticos	May 10, 2018	July 2, 2024
Deer Squad	May 10, 2021	July 2, 2024
Digby Dragon	April 10, 2019	July 2, 2024
Franklin	August 19, 2015	September 30, 2018
Franklin and Friends	March 4, 2015	September 6, 2021
Hey Duggee	February 20, 2019	July 2, 2024
Little Bear	March 4, 2015	July 2, 2024
Max & Ruby	March 21, 2018	November 11, 2022
Miss Spider's Sunny Patch Friends	March 4, 2015	September 30, 2018
Paw Patrol	February 21, 2018	July 2, 2024
Peppa Pig	November 16, 2017	July 2, 2024
Peter Rabbit	April 10, 2018	July 2, 2024
Pocoyo	March 4, 2015	June 30, 2019
Rainbow Rangers	October 2, 2019	July 2, 2024
Ricky Zoom	October 23, 2019	July 2, 2024
Rusty Rivets	August 7, 2019	July 2, 2024
Ryan's Mystery Playdate	October 2, 2019	July 2, 2024
Tickety Toc	July 19, 2017	June 30, 2019
Top Wing	November 6, 2019	September 6, 2021
Trulli Tales	September 25, 2019	September 6, 2021
Yo Gabba Gabba!	March 8, 2017	June 30, 2019
Zack & Quack	October 4, 2017	September 6, 2021

== See also ==
- List of Sesame Workshop productions
- List of programs broadcast by Nickelodeon
- List of programs broadcast by the Nick Jr. Channel
- List of programs broadcast by Nick at Nite
- List of programs broadcast by Nicktoons
- List of programs broadcast by TeenNick
- List of Nickelodeon original films
