= Best Friend's Date =

American television series

- Genre: Reality
- Directed by: Brian Crance
- Presented by: Tika Sumpter; Nick Slatkin
- Music by: Derek McKeith
- Country of origin: United States
- Original language: English
- No. of seasons: 1
- No. of episodes: 12

Production
- Producers: Rick de Oliveira; Adam Tobin
- Editors: Scott Teti; Dave Wilson
- Camera setup: Videotape; Multi-camera
- Running time: 22 minutes
- Production company: De Oliveira Entertainment Group

Original release
- Network: The N (Noggin)
- Release: December 3, 2004 – February 11, 2005

Best Friend's Date is an American reality-drama television series. It aired on the Noggin channel as part of its nighttime programming block for teens, The N. In each episode, a teenager goes on a blind date with someone chosen by his or her best friend. The show was hosted by Tika Sumpter and Nick Slatkin. It was filmed from July to August 2004.

The show ran for one season of 12 episodes. It premiered on December 3, 2004, and aired its last episode on February 11, 2005. The show is notable for launching Tika Sumpter's career and for featuring an entire episode, "The Boys' Night Out Date," about a gay relationship. Most episodes featured groups of teenage friends from Los Angeles, while the final two episodes included guest appearances by Drake, Ali Mukaddam, and Stacey Farber.

== Format ==
The show is based on the premise that people's best friends probably know them better than they know themselves. Each episode has a teenager's best friend screen and select their perfect blind date. Their compatibility is tested as cameras accompany each date to find out whether the result is "magic or tragic." Roger Catlin of the Hartford Courant likened the show's format to a "less perverse" version of Date My Mom.

The episodes start with a best friend selecting a date for their friend from a pool of four candidates. After they put each prospective date through rounds of interviews and challenges, the choice is made. Next, the best friend introduces their choice to their friend and their friend's parents. The young provisional couple must then cope with first date jitters and a variety of surprise curveballs that the show throws at them, like singing karaoke on street corners or bowling while handcuffed together. Each date ends with a deciding moment where each dater must decide whether it is a budding romance, a mutual "no thanks," or a heartbreaking rejection.

== History ==
Noggin LLC first trademarked the show's name and format on June 15, 2004. The show was officially announced to be greenlit by The Hollywood Reporter on July 13, 2004. It was shot on location in Los Angeles from July 24, 2004, through the end of August. The first episode premiered on December 3, 2004, and new episodes aired until February 11, 2005. The soundtrack for the show was composed by Derek McKeith.

The first ten episodes are self-contained stories, and the last two episodes make up an hour-long special. The special expands on the usual format by holding two dates (a double date) involving two celebrities: Drake (Aubrey Graham) and Ali Mukaddam. The finale aired on February 11, 2005, at 9:30 PM. An encore showing was played on February 13. A week before the finale aired, Multichannel News listed Best Friend's Date as one of the shows that helped to increase Noggin's ratings during its The N block by 15% by the end of 2004.

== Cast ==
- Tika Sumpter
- Nick Slatkin

== Episodes ==
Noggin aired the episodes slightly out of production order. It featured an episode guide on its The N website.

No.	Title	Original release date
1	"The Young Hollywood Date"	December 10, 2004
Jessica makes a group of boys walk on a runway in order to earn a Hollywood date with her friend Jennie.
2	"The Santa Monica Pier Date"	December 17, 2004
Julie has had a tough year romantically, so best friend Lindsay needs to pick a date carefully to help heal Julie's heart.
3	"The Player's Date"	December 3, 2004
Sarah is tough on the girls who are interested in dating her friend, 18-year-old LeAndre. The four hopeful teens make mix CDs and show off their best dance moves to score a date with LeAndre, who, along with the winner, is treated to a fun-filled day at a nearby theme park.
4	"The Love Songs Date"	January 21, 2005
Emily makes prospective dates shout out why they should date her cheerleader best friend, Nicole.
5	"The Surfer Boy's Date"	January 7, 2005
While picking a girl for his best friend Shelby, obnoxious surfer-boy Zack grates on the contestants' nerves.
6	"The 'Sister Knows Best?' Date"	December 28, 2004
Ashley's younger sister, Sierra, likes bad boys and typically chooses them for dates. When Ashley gets the chance to choose a date for Sierra, she tries her best to pick someone nice.
7	"The Boys' Night Out Date"	January 14, 2005
Allison tries to pick the right guy for her gay best friend Alan.
8	"The Karma Date"	January 28, 2005
Dejon chooses a date for her 19-year-old deejay friend, but it turns out that he and the girl already know each other. This leads to some awkward conversation during their date at a popular Los Angeles radio station.
9	"The OC Date"	December 30, 2004
After breaking her best friend Daniel's heart, Lily tries to mend it by picking the right girl in Orange County to go out with Daniel.
10	"The Shoot for Love Date"	February 4, 2005
Erin has a group of boys show off their basketball skills to win a date with her best friend Asia.
11	"The Celebrity Double Date" (Part 1)	February 11, 2005
In the first installment of a two-part special, Aubrey Drake Graham gets help from his co-star Stacey Farber to find a date and visit Los Angeles hotspots.
12	"The Celebrity Double Date" (Part 2)	February 11, 2005
In the follow-up to the previous part, Stacey Farber gives dating advice to Ali Mukaddam.
