= Agustin Reyes =

American television producer and theatre director

Gus Reyes is an American television producer and theatre director. For nearly ten years was co-founder and Producing Artistic Director of The Next Stage Company, a New York-based performing arts company, where he produced and directed over 200 shows. In New York, Reyes also directed plays, staged reading and or workshops at the Roundabout, Atlantic Theatre (Stage 2), MTC, MCC, Summer Play Festival, the Underwood Theatre and Epic Rep. Regionally, he has worked at the Hartford Stage and the Eugene O'Neill Theater Center in Connecticut, the Adirondack Theatre Festival in New York, the Salt Lake Acting Company in Utah, Onyx in North Carolina, and the Philadelphia Theatre Company in Pennsylvania. He frequently works with J. T. Rogers.

Reyes is the president and owner of Stolen Car Productions, specializing in production, post production and music for film and television, where he directs and or executive produces commercials, documentaries and film projects. He produced the opening sequence for Contest Searchlight on Comedy Central and executive-produced On the Team for Noggin and Nickelodeon. Stolen Car is also Executive Producer for JECO Music, creators of music for film and TV.

== Theatre credits ==
=== Off and Off-Off Broadway ===
- Atlantic Theater (Stage 2)
  - White People, by J. T. Rogers
- Summer Play Festival
  - Madagascar, by J. T. Rogers
- Epic Rep
  - Madagascar, by J. T. Rogers
  - Murmuring in a Dead Tongue, by J. T. Rogers
  - Beast in the Jungle, by Sasha Kahn
- The Next Stage Company (artistic director)
  - Spreading Out, by Missi Lopez Lecub
  - Murmuring in a Dead Tongue, by J. T. Rogers
  - The Further Adventures of Gussie Mae in America, by Letitia Guillory
  - Whatever the Matter May Be, by Missi Lopez Lecube
  - Frankfurt & Penetrating Malaysia, by J. T. Rogers
  - White People, by J. T. Rogers (Best Prod-OOBR, Best of the Best-Backstage)
  - Bob Comes to Life, by J. T. Rogers
  - Guy Talk, by J. T. Rogers
  - Above the Beasts, by J. T. Rogers
- MCC Theater
  - Another Complex, by Cara Bono

=== Regional ===
- Adirondack Theatre Festival
  - Madagascar, by J. T. Rogers
- Salt Lake Acting Company
  - Madagascar, by J. T. Rogers (Best Director-Weekly Press)
  - Seeing the Elephant, by J. T. Rogers
- Philadelphia Theatre Company
  - White People, by J. T. Rogers (Play of the Year-Barrymore nominee)

Various Staged Readings: Hartford Stage, Eugene O'Neill Theater Center, MTC, New Dramatists, etc.

Teacher/Guest Artist/Artist Residencies: New York University Faculty, O'Neill, NTI, University of Utah

Education: North Carolina School of the Arts, B.F.A.

Related skills and experience: Fluent in Spanish; produced over 200 productions and workshops of new plays, films, dance and music concerts, solo performance, and multimedia works.

== External reference links ==
- http://theater2.nytimes.com/mem/theater/treview.html?_r=1&html_title=&tols_title=WHITE%20PEOPLE%20(PLAY)&pdate=20000215&byline=By%20BEN%20BRANTLEY&id=1077011432008&scp=2&sq=gus%20reyes&st=cse
- https://www.newyorker.com/arts/events/theatre/2009/02/02/090202goth_GOAT_theatre
- https://www.variety.com/review/VE1117939557.html?categoryid=33&cs=1
- https://web.archive.org/web/20090206090648/http://playbill.com/news/article/125847.html
- http://theater2.nytimes.com/gst/theater/tdetails.html?id=1231546496806&scp=3&sq=gus%20reyes&st=cse
- nydailynews.com
- http://broadwayworld.com/blogs/viewblog.cfm?blogid=2348
- https://www.timeout.com/newyork/events/theater/265647/white-people
- http://www.whitepeopletheplay.com/gusreyes.html
- http://www.curtainup.com/whitepeople.html
- http://www.imdb.com/name/nm1190827/
- https://web.archive.org/web/20090124151516/http://www.nytheatre.com/nytheatre/showpage.php?t=whit7891
- https://books.google.com/books?id=WFsdoiSZfboC&dq=Gus+Reyes&pg=PA5
- https://books.google.com/books?id=4YULs2uEvtQC&dq=Gus+Reyes&pg=PA5
- https://books.google.com/books?id=CcVciO--PkgC&dq=Gus+Reyes&pg=RA1-PT180
- http://www.linkedin.com/pub/3/b99/ab3
- http://broadwayworld.com/article/WHITE_PEOPLE_Begins_Previews_128_At_The_Atlantic_Stage_20090128
- https://web.archive.org/web/20110713165133/http://www.kornbergpr.com/white_people/White_People_press_release.pdf
- http://www.jecomusic.com/libraries/contact.php
- http://www.stolencar.net/
- https://www.nytimes.com/1993/06/28/arts/dance-in-review-450693.html?sq=gus+reyes&scp=4&st=cse
- http://tv.nytimes.com/show/158583/On-the-Team/overview?scp=7&sq=gus%20reyes&st=cse
- https://web.archive.org/web/20081120121435/http://www.epic-rep.com/2004.htm
- https://web.archive.org/web/20090222052326/http://ncarts.edu/drama/dramaalumninews.htm
- https://web.archive.org/web/20090129205336/http://atfestival.org/history.htm
- https://web.archive.org/web/20110707094924/http://www.aicpshow.com/cgi-bin/member_directory.cgi?num=000000000000106&table=AICP_AMP_mem
- https://web.archive.org/web/20110714073035/http://web.memberclicks.com/mc/directory/viewResultsPageByLetter.do?hidWhereTo=R&updateTags=true&userId=&selectPageNav=1&pageNumber=&selectPageNavBottom=1
- https://web.archive.org/web/20081118180226/http://www.playpenn.org/05photogallery.html
- http://www.oobr.com/top/volTwo/seventeen/OOBR-White.html
- https://gasikara.blogspot.com/2005/06/madagascar-play.html
- https://web.archive.org/web/20110716063337/https://secure.showbizdata.com/contacts/jobcity.cfm?country=United%20States&job=Post-Production&city=New%20York
