= Karen Fowler (disambiguation) =

Karen Joy Fowler is an American children's book author.

Karen Fowler may also refer to:

- Karen Fowler, a contestant of Big Brother 1 (American season)
- Karen Fowler, a developer of The Electric Company reboot series (2009–11)
- Karen Fowler, a producer and narrator of short-lived American children's television game show Sponk! (2001)
