= Professional Performing Arts School =

Public school in New York City

- PPAS
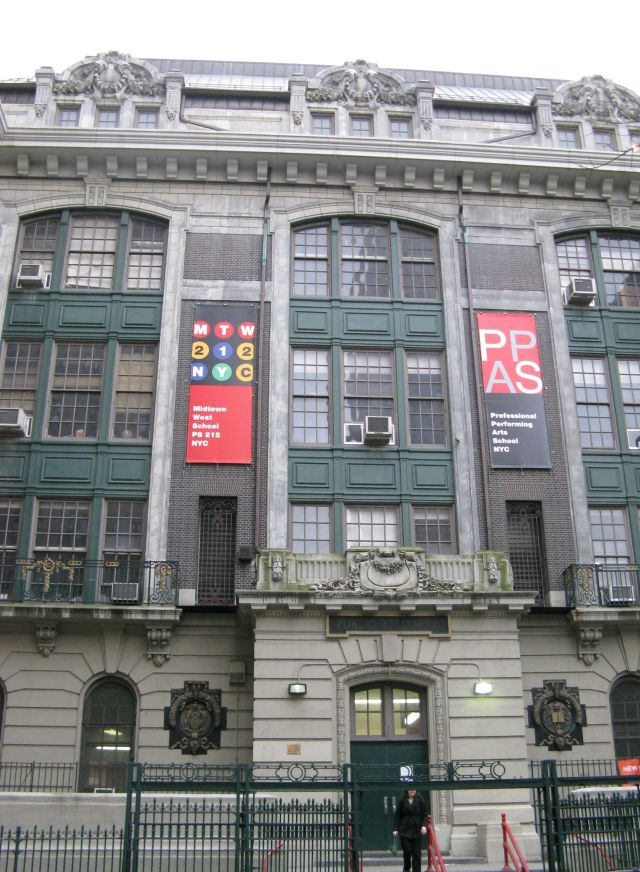

Location
- 328 West 48th St. Manhattan, New York City; United States; 40°45′42″N 73°59′19″W

Information
- Type: Public
- Established: 1990
- School district: 10036
- Principal: Leah Dyer
- Teaching staff: 30 academic teachers
- Grades: 6–12
- Enrollment: 485
- Campus type: Urban
- Yearbook: 2009
- Website: http://www.ppasnyc.org/

The Professional Performing Arts School (PPAS) is a public middle and high school specializing in the performing arts, located in the Hell's Kitchen neighborhood of Manhattan, New York City. Middle school students focus on Theater Arts while high school students major in Dance, Drama, Film, Musical Theater or Vocal.

PPAS maintains professional partnerships with several performing arts organizations, including Rosie's Theater Kids, Evolution Arts, The National Chorale, Ballet Tech, Manhattan Youth Ballet, School of American Ballet, American Ballet Theatre, and Alvin Ailey American Dance Theater.

== History ==
PPAS, serving 6th through 12th grade, was created in 1990 to meet the needs of two groups of students: those who wanted to pursue professional work in the arts as they earned a junior/senior high school diploma, and those who wanted to study the arts as an avocation.

== Notable alumni ==
- Eddie Alderson, actor (Daytime Emmy Award nominee for One Life to Live)
- Kristen Alderson, actress (Daytime Emmy Award winner for One Life to Live)
- Nadia Azzi, pianist
- Morena Baccarin, actress (Firefly, Primetime Emmy Award nominee for Homeland)
- Andrea Bowen, actress (Desperate Housewives, Les Misérables)
- Monét X Change, drag queen, singer (Rupaul's Drag Race, RuPaul's Drag Race All Stars)
- Tru Collins, singer and actor (Trans-Siberian Orchestra)
- Lana Condor, actress (To All the Boys I've Loved Before)
- Ben Cook, actor
- Billy Crawford, singer, actor and television Host (It's Showtime)
- Julia Cumming, singer, songwriter, bassist (Sunflower Bean), model and activist
- Claire Danes, actress (My So-Called Life, Primetime Emmy Award winner for Homeland)
- Melonie Diaz, actress (Raising Victor Vargas, Fruitvale Station)
- Max Ehrich, actor and dancer (Daytime Emmy Award nominee for The Young and the Restless)
- Jesse Eisenberg, actor (Academy Award nominee for The Social Network)
- Noah Galvin, actor (The Real O'Neals, Theater Camp)
- Jessica Lee Goldyn, actress and dancer (A Chorus Line)
- Sarah Hyland, actress (Modern Family, Lipstick Jungle)
- Paul Iacono, actor and director (The Hard Times of RJ Berger, Fame)
- Mark Indelicato, actor (Ugly Betty, White Bird in a Blizzard)
- Aubrey Joseph, actor (Cloak and Dagger)
- Alicia Keys, actress, singer and pianist (multiple Grammy Award winner)
- Christy Knowings, actor, musician, writer and dancer (All That, Sesame Street)
- Samantha Logan, actress (All American, 13 Reasons Why)
- Jake Lucas, actor (Broadway production of Newsies, Peter Pan Live!, the 2015 Broadway revival of The King and I)
- Gregori Lukas, singer and dancer (Recording Artist, The Nutcracker, New York City Ballet)
- Paul McGill, actor and dancer (Bullets Over Broadway, Fame)
- Taylor Momsen, actress and singer (Gossip Girl, The Pretty Reckless)
- Asher Monroe, actor, dancer and singer (V Factory, Fame)
- Christian Navarro, actor (Vinyl, 13 Reasons Why)
- Eric Nelsen, actor and dancer (All My Children, 13: The Musical)
- Connor Paolo, actor (Gossip Girl, Revenge)
- Karina Pasian, singer and pianist (Grammy Award nominee for First Love)
- Josh Peck, actor and comedian (Drake & Josh, The Amanda Show)
- Justin Peck, dancer and choreographer (New York City Ballet)
- Victor Rasuk, actor (How to Make it in America, Fifty Shades film series)
- Alisa Reyes, actress (All That, The Proud Family)
- Elena Satine, actress and singer (Magic City, Revenge)
- Max Schneider, singer and actor (How To Rock, Rags)
- Troy Schumacher, choreographer, dancer, director (BalletCollective, New York City Ballet)
- Dominique Thorne, actress (If Beale Street Could Talk, Judas and the Black Messiah)
- Rebecca Harrell Tickell, actress, producer and director (Prancer, FUEL, The Big Fix)
- Addison Timlin, actress (Derailed, Zero Hour)
- Louie Torrellas, actor and comedian (Sponk!, Jumper)
- Chris Trousdale, actor and singer (The Biggest Fan, Dream Street)
- Daniel Ulbricht, dancer (New York City Ballet)
- Jamila Velazquez, actor (Empire, Twisted)
- Malina Weissman, actress (A Series of Unfortunate Events)
- Jeremy Allen White, actor (Shameless, The Bear)
- Lee Thompson Young, actor (The Famous Jett Jackson, Rizzoli & Isles)
- Lara Raj, singer and dancer (Katseye)
