= Ebb and Flo =

- Created by: Jane Simmons
- Directed by: Thomas Voigt
- Narrated by: Fiona Shaw
- Countries of origin: United Kingdom; Germany
- Original languages: English; German

Production
- Running time: 5 minutes
- Production companies: Canning Factory; Hahn Film AG; VGI Entertainment

Original release
- Release: November 14, 2005 – January 2006

Ebb and Flo is an animated short series co-produced by Canning Factory Productions from the UK and Hahn Film AG from Germany. Kate Canning and Gerhard Hahn were the supervising directors and producers.

The show is based on the books by children's author Jane Simmons. Simmons, who won a silver Nestle Smarties Book Prize for Come On, Daisy! wrote the first Ebb and Flo book, Ebb's New Friend, in 1998. Three more books followed, all published by Orchard.

The show aired on Five in the United Kingdom and on Noggin in the United States. It features the narration of Fiona Shaw.

== Synopsis ==
The world of Ebb and Flo is seen through Ebb's eyes and Ebb reveals all the emotions grown-ups usually try to hide.

5-year-old Flo does not think of Ebb as a dog, and Ebb doesn't think of Flo as a child, they're simply best friends. Life revolves around their home, a boat moored near the mouth of a sea estuary, the boatyard and the little dinghy in which they visit Flo's Granny. She lives up a nearby creek and at her house in the wilderness, time seems to stand still.

As they play, they find there are so many things to discover and with the arrival of Bird (a large white goose), Ebb finds that some of life's early lessons are tough to deal with. With Flo's help though, and her own naughty humour, Ebb struggles through. But never far away, Ma keeps a watchful eye over them, but rarely intrudes on their life together with Bird as they make new friends in and around the boatyard.
