= Wild Side Show =

Educational television show

- Genre: Nature
- Written by: Melanie York; Jennifer McAuley-Biasi
- Presented by: Jessica Durante; Scott Tunnell; Jillian Hirasawa; Gordon Michael Woolvett
- Composer: Bob Wiseman
- Countries of origin: United States; Canada
- No. of seasons: 2
- No. of episodes: 26

Production
- Production locations: San Diego Zoo (season 1); Toronto Zoo (season 2)
- Running time: 23 minutes
- Production companies: Safari Productions, Inc.; Alliance Atlantis

Original release
- Network: Nickelodeon
- Release: February 21, 1992 – February 6, 1994

Wild Side Show (shortened to Wild Side for its second season) is a nature documentary series for children, which aired on Nickelodeon and later Noggin. The show originally ran from February 21, 1992 to February 6, 1994 on Nickelodeon, with reruns until December 30, 1995, before it moved to Noggin on February 2, 1999 – and reran until March 31, 2002. Segments from the series were also included as part of Noggin's Phred on Your Head Show.

The show focuses on up-close encounters with animals, both in zoos and in their natural habitats. The producers wanted to avoid the style of a "nature show with a voice-over narration and no humans in sight," which is why the hosts were "so close to the animals, right next to their faces." Most of the show was live-action, but short animated segments were also used to explain concepts and add humor.

Wild Side Show ran for two seasons and 26 episodes in total. The first season, hosted by Jessica Durante and Scott Tunnell, was taped at the San Diego Zoo. The second season, hosted by Jillian Hirasawa and Gordon Michael Woolvett, was taped at the Toronto Zoo in Canada. Safari scenes were taped throughout southern Africa. Some episodes visited different locations, like Yellowstone National Park.

== Cast ==
- Jessica Durante – Co-host of season one. She was a fan of snakes and had pet snakes at her home.
- Scott Tunnell – Co-host of season one. He had a farm at home and raised goats and pigs.
- Jillian Hirasawa – Co-host of season two.
- Gordon Michael Woolvett – Co-host of season two.

== History ==
The first episode aired on February 21, 1992. This episode reran throughout 1992. The rest of the show started airing regularly on August 16, 1992.

When Nickelodeon and Sesame Workshop launched the Noggin channel on February 2, 1999, Wild Side Show was part of the daily schedule. It aired regularly on Noggin until March 31, 2002. Segments from the show were included in many episodes of Noggin's Phred on Your Head Show.

The company Studio 100 currently owns the distribution rights to Wild Side Show. In 2018, the second season of Wild Side Show was included in Studio 100's online catalogue of series.

== Episodes ==
Season	Episodes	Originally released	
Season	Episodes	First released	Last released
1	13	February 21, 1992	October 31, 1993
2	13	November 6, 1993	February 6, 1994

== Reception ==
TV Guide called the show "a fascinating surf-and-turf safari that should appeal to all ages." The Muscatine Journal wrote that "youngsters at home will certainly enjoy this romp through exotic locales with the show's hosts, a pair of kids who seem to possess a genuine appreciation of where they go and what they see." In the magazine College & Research Libraries News, the show was highlighted as an example of how "modern children's educational television can be a marvelous place to learn things."

Wild Side Show was nominated in the category "Best Children's Program or Series" at the 1995 Gemini Awards.
