= Louie Torrellas =

American actor

- Born: Louie Joseph Torrellas; July 19, 1987 (age 39); Long Island, New York, U.S.

Comedy career
- Years active: 1998–present
- Medium: Stand-up, film, television, entrepreneur
- Genres: Satire, Political satire, Observational comedy, Character comedy
- Subjects: Race relations, racism, Latino-American culture, pop culture, human sexuality, American politics, current events, self-deprecation
- Website: LouieTorrellas.com

Louie Joseph Torrellas (born July 19, 1987) is an American actor, comedian, producer, writer, and entrepreneur. His work includes roles in films such as Jumper, Sponk, and Blood and Bone, and video games such as Bully and The Warriors. His film "To Be Friends" won Best Cinematography at the 2010 Boston Film Festival. He also hosted the Emmy Award-winning television series Yankees on Deck.

== Early life ==
Torrellas was born in Long Island, New York to a Puerto Rican father and a Cuban mother. He has two younger sisters. His maternal grandfather was of Turkish descent and his paternal grandfather was of Spanish descent. Torrellas's father worked at WABC-TV. He grew up in Jamaica, Queens and began performing in school plays at the age of five. He also performed in community theater at Queens Theatre In The Park (Flushing Meadow). He moved with his father to Manhattan and attended the Professional Performing Arts School starting in 7th grade.

== Stand-up comedy ==
Torrellas began performing stand-up comedy at age 10 at Carolines on Broadway. He continued performing stand-up while attending school and trained at the American Comedy Institute. He toured as a teenager, performing in the Caribbean, California, and across the tri-state area. He was part of the "We Got Next Tour!" and appeared on various television shows doing stand-up, including Late Night with Conan O'Brien.

Torrellas also founded Laugh Fiend Productions, a comedy production company. He has produced stand-up shows at St. John's University and Stand-Up NY.

== Acting ==
Torrellas's early career included appearances in an AT&T commercial and a regular role on the Nickelodeon/Noggin show Sponk. He transitioned to dramatic acting and appeared in episodes of Law & Order and Third Watch, and the miniseries Miracle's Boys. He has also appeared in video games such as Grand Theft Auto, The Warriors, and Bully. His film credits include Jumper, Blood and Bone, and It Runs in the Family.

== Media personality ==
Torrellas has hosted various events, television shows, and internet broadcasts. His early hosting roles included Teen Time Live. He hosted and created Yankees on Deck. He also hosted the Yankees' seventh-inning stretch program during the 2009 season.

== Ambitious Media ==
In 2011, Torrellas co-founded Ambitious Media, a production company with offices in New York and Los Angeles. The company produces fashion and music video content, and has worked with clients such as Wiz Khalifa and Machine Gun Kelly.
