= Gregori Lukas =

American singer-songwriter

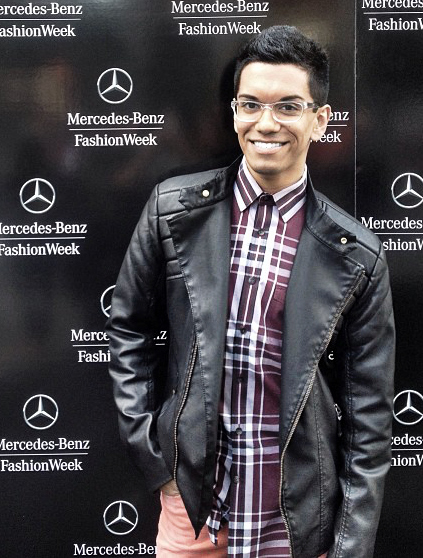
- Gregori Lukas attends Mercedes-Benz Fashion Week, NYC September 2013

Background information
- Born: Gregory Lucas Malek-Jones; May 12, 1990 (age 36); Montclair, New Jersey, US
- Instrument: Vocals
- Label: KAP/21, UMG
- Website: gregorilukas.com

Gregory Lucas Malek-Jones (born May 12, 1990) known professionally as Gregori Lukas is an American recording artist, singer, dancer and actor. Gregori released his debut single "Stay", in March 2013, composed by world renowned composer and conductor, Tomer Adaddi, a composer known for his unique blend of classical and contemporary music. Lukas released his second single, "Belong" on March 5, 2015. He has appeared with the New York City Ballet in numerous productions and is best known for playing the title role in George Balanchine's Nutcracker at the New York State Theater in Lincoln Center.

== Life and career ==
Born and raised in Montclair, New Jersey, Malek-Jones attended the Professional Performing Arts School in New York City alongside Taylor Momsen, Sarah Hyland and others where he studied musical theater. While in attendance at the Professional Performing Arts School, he was nominated for the New Jersey Theater Alliance's NJACT Perry Award for Best Male Ensemble actor in a musical for his role in the Montclair Operetta Club's Children of Eden. Gregori also attended the School of American Ballet, the official school of the New York City Ballet in Lincoln Center from the years 2000–2008. During his term with the School of American Ballet he performed in various shows with the New York City Ballet, including Harlequinade, Swan Lake, Vienna Waltzes, Sleeping Beauty and George Balanchine The Nutcracker. While in production with George Balanchine The Nutcracker, he was featured in the film, The Nutcracker Family : Behind the Magic, directed by Virginia Loring Brooks. Malek-Jones also starred in the film adaptation for the independent film Tap Dreams, directed by Anthony Giordano. Malek-Jones appeared with the Paper Mill Playhouse in various theater productions such as The King And I and Carousel. He also sang alongside Tony Award winner Ben Vereen for the New Voices concert in April 2003. In 2005, Malek-Jones appeared with New York City's Camp Broadway with "Melissa & Joey" star Joey Lawrence in the Macy's Thanksgiving Day Parade singing "Ac-Cent-Tchu-Ate the Positive". In February 2010, Gregory and his longtime friend formed the pop music group Closet Boys and digitally released their debut single, "I Wanna Go", worldwide under The Island Def Jam Music Group. Gregory now resides in Upper Montclair, New Jersey and New York City.

== Discography ==
=== Singles ===
- "Stay" (2013)
- "Belong" (2015)

== Filmography ==
Film
Year	Title	Role	Notes
2006	The Nutcracker Family : Behind the Magic	The Nutcracker/Prince	
