= Bottle Rocket (company) =

Web-based game developer

- Industry: Interactive Entertainment
- Founded: 1996 (acquired: 2000)
- Fate: Acquired by ACTV (since acquired by OpenTV)
- Headquarters: New York City

Bottle Rocket, Inc. was a leading developer of Web-based casual games and advergames from 1996 until 2000, when the company was acquired by ACTV, a technical and creative interactive television services company later acquired by OpenTV. Based in New York City, the company created more than 40 licensed trivia, prediction, simulation, arcade-style and multiplayer game formats played by more than 600,000 registered users, and specialized in sports-related content.

== History ==
The company was founded in Manhattan’s “Silicon Alley” in 1996, and was briefly known as Lucid Media. Bottle Rocket’s first game title was IBM Rangers Shootout, an online hockey trivia game built for the New York Rangers and sponsored by IBM. Bottle Rocket also built football, baseball, basketball and soccer sports trivia games for clients including AC Milan, Arsenal FC, Major League Baseball, National Basketball Association, National Football League, StarMedia and The Sporting News, and also to develop arcade-style games and prediction games.

In 1998, with investment from London-based online sports company Pangolin, Bottle Rocket began to sign larger game development deals in the sports industry, and to expand into music, general entertainment and other non-sports content. Bottle Rocket and the NHL launched the NHL Game Room, featuring a variety of hockey-themed games, and the company also partnered with The Sporting News on TSN TriviArena, a suite of five sports trivia games offering collectible sports memorabilia as prizes to the best players monthly. Bottle Rocket also developed titles such as The Hollywood Aptitude Test (entertainment trivia) for E! Online, Predict The Winners (Oscars prediction game) for Reel.com, VMA Pool Party (Video Music Awards prediction game) for MTV, and Skengle & Skengle (a tamagotchi-like game) for Noggin.

In 1999, Electronic Arts made an investment in Bottle Rocket, and also announced a three-year development agreement between the two companies to develop FanSlam, an online trivia contest that pits sports fans against one another. In 1999 and 2000, Bottle Rocket announced new deals and game launches including Shoot for Six (golf trivia) for Nuts.com, a game for the Westminster Kennel Club, and Bubble Boy Hockey (simulated table-top hockey game) for ESPN with sponsorship by Budweiser.

In August 2000 Bottle Rocket was acquired by ACTV for an undisclosed sum. Bottle Rocket continued to operate as a wholly owned subsidiary of the company, developing both online and interactive television games. ACTV, including the Bottle Rocket subsidiary, was acquired by OpenTV in 2002.
