= Phred on Your Head Show =

American children's television series

- Genre: Variety show
- Created by: Amy Friedman
- Starring: Doug Preis
- Theme music composer: Michael Ungar
- Country of origin: United States
- Original language: English
- No. of seasons: 2

Production
- Executive producer: Amy Friedman
- Producers: Michael Pecoriello; Sally Anne Syberg; Lissette Decos
- Running time: 30–120 minutes
- Production companies: MTV Animation; Tricky Pictures; Possible Worlds

Original release
- Network: Noggin
- Release: June 6, 1999 – September 9, 2001

Related
- The URL with Phred Show

Phred on Your Head Show is an American children's television series produced for Noggin, a cable channel co-founded by MTV Networks and Sesame Workshop. The first episode aired on June 6, 1999. Noggin aired encore showings of the first episode throughout June and started airing the show regularly on July 26, 1999. The show stars a small green character named Phred, voiced by Doug Preis, who resembles an athromporphic pickle (a running gag has him insist he is not actually a pickle) and has his own variety show. In each episode, Phred hops across different people's heads to find a host, who then chooses a selection of Noggin programs to play.

Phred was animated by two studios: MTV Animation and Possible Worlds. The show was linked with Noggin's website, Noggin.com, and Phred's home is said to be inside the "dot" of Noggin.com. The episodes encourage viewers to visit Noggin.com and send in their own ideas, comments, and questions for future episodes. These were integrated into the show as part of a segment called "Phred's Got Mail". Other segments called "We Show It" and "Out of Your Mind" feature short films created by Noggin viewers.

Phred on Your Head Show debuted to successful ratings, posting a 2.2 Nielsen score in 1999. Multichannel News reported that the show drew record traffic to Noggin's website. The show ran for two seasons and aired its last new episode on September 9, 2001, with a spin-off series called The URL with Phred Show later premiering in its place. The spin-off was formatted as an online art showcase hosted by Phred, and it had more emphasis on viewers' submissions to Noggin.com.

== Format ==
=== Opening ===
Phred during the "Pickles to Pluto" game

The show opens with a prologue explaining Phred's backstory. He was a mascot for a pickle company called Phantastic Pickles and lived on a pickle jar. One day, Phred's pickle jar rolled off of a supermarket shelf and set him free. He was curious about the outside world and looked for a good place to think, which led him to the dot of Noggin.com. There, he became Noggin's spokesperson and went from "pickle jar to TV star."

The rest of the show centers on Phred presenting his own variety show from the head of a child. An unseen character named Big Voice (also voiced by Doug Preis) gives Phred the name of the upcoming episode's host. Phred hops from head to head of different people, and when he finds the host, a stop-motion theme song plays. It has replaceable lyrics that change to fit in the host's name. Once the host has been introduced, Phred tells the Noggin crew to "pickle" the host. This teleports the host and Phred into Noggin.com, where they choose different Noggin programs to show.

=== Segments ===
- Featured content - Each episode usually includes clips from certain Noggin programs while Phred is "searching" for the host. These include Doug, Nick News, Dirk Niblick of the Math Brigade, The Further Adventures of Zook & Alison, Sesame Street Unpaved, Mathnet, and The Electric Company. Occasionally, a short from "Snick Snack" or Short Films by Short People was also shown.
- Cecile and Her Very Own Universe - A planned series of animated shorts, specially created for the show and written by Peter Reynolds, about the title 13-year-old girl and her robotic dog Comet, who were raised in the futuristic underground civilization of Metro on a distant planet, as they secretly explore the untamed surface world while others race to reach the planet's core. Production was canceled after only one episode, "The Root", aired.
- Phred's Got Mail - Big Voice gives Phred a piece of fan mail to read aloud. The fan mail letters were submitted by viewers on Noggin.com.
- Pickles to Pluto - A game segment where Phred asks a player to connect two things that seem like they have nothing in common in six steps or less.
- Tête à Tête with Phred - Phred hops onto the head of different historical figures and interviews them.
- We Show It - A user-submitted segment where Phred plays a home video submitted by a viewer.

== History ==
=== Production ===
The concept for Phred was developed in 1999 by Amy Friedman, the creative director of Noggin. She approached three animators—Tony Caio, Janine Cirincione, and Michael Ferraro—to help her develop an idea for an animated host on Noggin. Three potential hosts were designed, and Noggin.com visitors were asked to vote for which one they liked the most. The winning design was "the Tattoo Dude," who was eventually renamed Phred. The character was designed by Tony Caio, who also drew most of Phred's poses for the show. Caio designed Phred as an amorphous "animated tattoo" who could appear on people's heads. He says he created Phred as an example of "the little person we all carry in our heads, especially when we're younger. I didn't see any need for hands and wanted to do something with the modern idea of tattoos. Phred's just one big old head on your head."

Cirincione and Ferraro scanned the Phred designs into a computer, then used them to create a database where Phred's poses could be digitally manipulated like a puppet. They added a voice-activated element that matched sounds with lip movements, allowing Phred's speech to be animated in real time.

The show's animation was handled by two studios: MTV Animation and Possible Worlds, a studio owned by Cirincione and Ferraro. Phred's theme song was written by Michael Ungar, a songwriter who later worked with Noggin on Girls v. Boys. The show's audio mixing and sound design were done by Broadway Sound, a studio in New York.

The first season of Phred on Your Head Show contained 21 episodes, which were all animated over the course of six weeks in mid-1999. On February 1, 2000, Noggin renewed the show for a second season of 10 episodes. The second season's episodes were finished by September 2000.

=== Broadcast ===
The first episode of Phred on Your Head Show previewed on Nickelodeon on June 6, 1999, at 12 p.m. An encore showing aired on Noggin at 8 p.m. on the same day. Noggin aired reruns of the same episode throughout June, and it started airing the show regularly on Noggin on July 26, 1999. Until November 22, 1999, Noggin aired the show twice daily from 5-7 p.m. and from 8-10 p.m.

On March 27, 2000, Nickelodeon introduced an early-morning block called "Noggins Up" (later renamed "Noggin on Nick") that aired shows from the Noggin channel starting at 6:30 a.m. Phred on Your Head was shown during this time slot (usually on Mondays and Fridays) until February 2001.

On July 12, 2021, it was announced that the show would be made available on the streaming service Paramount+. The series has a page on Paramount+, but no episodes have been added as of 2022.

== Episodes ==
The show has two seasons. The first season was made in 1999, and the second season was made in 2000. The runtime of the episodes varied: there were half-hour, one-hour, and two-hour episodes.

=== Half-hour episodes ===
Nickelodeon's website featured an episode guide for Phred on Your Head Show, which listed only the half-hour episodes (21 episodes in all). This episode guide was also featured on the website Excite TV. Each episode's title is the name of the host. The hosts are only called by their first names on the show, but some of the episode titles feature their last names. The one-hour and two-hour episodes were never listed on Nickelodeon's guide, so the titles are unknown.

| No. | Title |
|---|---|
| 1 | Episode 1: Mary Elizabeth King |
| 2 | Episode 2: John Quashie |
| 3 | Episode 3: Gilbert |
| 4 | Episode 4: Chance Bradley |
| 5 | Episode 5: Ashley Saunders |
| 6 | Episode 6: Dana Harrison |
| 7 | Episode 7: Terrence Ali |
| 8 | Episode 8: Noemi |
| 9 | Episode 9: Billy |
| 10 | Episode 10: Adam |
| 11 | Episode 11: Keisha |
| 12 | Episode 12: Allyson & Jillian |
| 13 | Episode 13: Erik |
| 14 | Episode 14: Anthony |
| 15 | Episode 15: Kelly |
| 16 | Episode 16: Bess |
| 17 | Episode 17: Tai |
| 18 | Episode 18: Amy |
| 19 | Episode 19: Omar |
| 20 | Episode 20: Kim |
| 21 | Episode 21: Craig |

=== Hour-long episodes ===
The show's first-ever episode was an hour-long episode hosted by a boy named Chad. Hour-long episodes hosted by Mary and Anthony existed as well, and these same episodes were also trimmed down and aired as half-hour episodes.

=== Two-hour episodes ===
From July 26 until November 22, 1999, the show had two-hour episodes. They aired twice daily on Noggin, from 5-7 p.m. and from 8-10 p.m. The first two-hour episode on July 26 involved Phred returning home after being stranded on Pluto. After November 22, the two-hour episodes were discontinued, but the half-hour and hour-long episodes still aired regularly.

== Reception ==
The first episode of Phred on Your Head Show drew over 850,000 viewers, generating a 2.2 Nielsen Media Research national rating. More than 112,000 visitors logged onto Noggin.com after the show, marking a 220% increase over the site's average traffic at the time. From June to July 1999, about 36,000 emails were sent to Phred from viewers.

Phred on Your Head Show is described in a 2001 book called "Designing for Children: Marketing Design that Speaks to Kids." It is highlighted as an example of a TV show that was successfully able to integrate television with the Internet. Joanne Ostrow, an author for The Denver Post, wrote in November 1999 that she was "a connoisseur of Noggin's Phred on Your Head Show" and thought it was the most enjoyable part of Noggin's lineup.

== The URL with Phred Show ==
A spin-off based on Phred on Your Head Show premiered in 2001, called The URL with Phred Show. It focuses on user-generated content submitted to Noggin.com.
