= The URL with Phred Show =

- Logo
- Starring: Doug Preis; Stephanie Michaels
- Country of origin: United States
- No. of episodes: 20

Production
- Producer: Alyssa Cooper
- Editor: Leslie Boone
- Running time: 60 minutes

Original release
- Network: Noggin
- Release: September 10, 2001 – 2002

Related
- Phred on Your Head Show

The URL with Phred Show is an American children's television series produced for the Noggin channel. It is a spin-off series to Phred on Your Head Show, an earlier Noggin series with the same animated host: a small, green character named Phred. Premieres of The URL with Phred Show aired from September 10, 2001 until 2002, and reruns aired until 2004. The show is presented as an art showcase, and each episode follows Phred as he presents a mix of viewer-submitted artwork and messages from Noggin's website.

The show was named after URL, a term for an online web address. In the episodes, the URL name is said to also stand for "U R Live," emphasizing how viewers could submit their own art and messages to Noggin's website to see them live on the show. In a departure from the original Phred on Your Head Show, the spin-off is themed around a website interface, and there are a variety of new characters who co-host the show with Phred. Most of the new characters started out in Noggin's online games before appearing on the show.

== Format ==
Phred and his friends from Noggin.com

=== Characters ===
- Phred - The main host of the show, a former pickle mascot who looks like a yellow-green blob with short legs. He talks with a Brooklyn accent. As a running gag, Phred is often asked what his species is, and he will try to respond before being interrupted by a mishap in the studio. He was voiced by Doug Preis.
- Noggimation Boy - A miniature boy made of 8-bit pixels who hosts the segment "Noggimation Station." He has stringy red hair and wears a purple shirt. In his segment, he shows short animations submitted by Noggin.com users. He is hyperactive, talks in a sped-up voice, and is always moving around. Phred likes watching Noggimation Boy's animations but tends to get annoyed by him.
- Birthday Boy - An untidy yellow cartoon boy who hosts the segment "Birthday Time." He is always eating birthday cake and talks with his mouth full. He lives in a kitchen and likes to bake. His job is to announce the birthdays for Noggin.com users, but he usually shows up late and messes up his lines. At the end of each episode, Birthday Boy has a different excuse for being late to the "goodbye" segment.
- Skengle and Skengle - Two aliens, named Skibby and Cud, who host the segment "Skengle Poll." They want to take over Noggin.com and then the Earth. They use online polls to find out everything about Earth and its people, hoping their knowledge will help them take over the world. The first Skengle, Skibby, is a blue cyclops with a female voice who wears a helmet. The second Skengle, Cud, is a light green wig creature who wears a hair bow and floats around.
- The Whats - A group of colorful birds with mismatched features who host the segment "Question the Whats." They mostly communicate through warped sounds, squawks, and buzzing noises.
- Big Voice - A sarcastic unseen announcer who narrates the segment "High Scores." He often bickers with Phred, makes fun of him, and points out errors. Along with Phred, he is one of only two characters from Phred on Your Head Show to return for the spin-off. Although Big Voice is never shown on screen, Phred is able to see him and comments that he is "fat with an F."
- The Director - The off-screen director of the show. She is heard throughout all of the different segments. She also narrates the transitions from scene to scene, which usually involve her hurriedly trying to find the next act.

=== Segments ===
- Featured content - Like the original series, URL with Phred featured select episodes from shows such as Doug and Cro.
- Phred's Email - This segment is usually featured at the start of the episodes. In it, Big Voice gives Phred an email from a Noggin.com user. Phred reads the email aloud and responds to it. Video messages and artwork were sometimes shown.
- Dress Phred - Phred wears outfits designed by Noggin.com users. This segment is very brief and is often featured more than once in each episode.
- Noggimation Station - Noggimation Boy shows a short digital animation from a Noggin.com user. As a running gag, Noggimation Boy sometimes tries to start the segment by chanting each letter of "Noggimation," but Phred interrupts him.
- Birthday Time - This segment features a list of Noggin.com users whose birthday was on a certain date. It is presented by Birthday Boy, with off-screen singing from Phred.
- Skengle Poll - The Skengles announce the results of their online polls. In these segments, the Skengles often accidentally mention their plans to take over the Earth, which makes Phred question them.
- Question the Whats - The Whats appear in a presentation of riddles.
- High Scores - Big Voice announces the highest-scoring users for different online games on Noggin.com. When an unregistered user has a high score, their name is listed as "Nogginer."
- Goodbyes - This is the closing act of the show. It features the main characters gathering in Phred's room to say goodbye. One character (often Birthday Boy) is always late and holds up the end of the show.

== History ==
=== Production ===
An important change from the older Phred on Your Head Show was the addition of co-host characters who appear along with Phred in their own segments. Most of the new characters originated in Noggin's online games.

Noggimation Boy first appeared as part of the "Noggimation Quilt," an online feature where users could create and upload their own animations. After enough animations were posted, Noggin put them together as the patches of a digital quilt. Nickelodeon trademarked the name Noggimation on May 30, 2000, two months before The URL with Phred Show started.

The Skengles were created by Noggin and Bottle Rocket for a game, just called "Skengle," in 1999. The Skengle game asked thought-provoking questions to users and told them where they stood with their opinions in relation to others. It gave users the opportunity to tell Noggin why they chose certain answers, which Noggin could then publish on the site, making the users' voices heard. The game was reworked and renamed "Skengle Poll" for URL with Phred. The original game also gave a backstory to the Skengles, which was dropped and left unmentioned in the show. It described them as "aliens who, after drinking orange juice and brushing their teeth, cause a cataclysmic reaction that sends them hurtling through space towards Earth."

=== Broadcast ===
The show was first announced by Noggin on June 11, 2001, and it was scheduled to premiere in summer 2001. It first appeared on Noggin's schedule on July 28, 2001. The show aired regularly throughout August and September. According to a Noggin press release, the show's official premiere was on September 10, and all previous airings were sneak peeks. URL with Phred continued to air in reruns until 2004, but its last daily airing was on March 31, 2002. From 2003 to 2004, reruns were shown on Noggin during an early-morning block (3 am to 5 am) dedicated to educational shows.
