= Sheila Frazier =

American actress

- Born: Sheila Elaine Frazier; November 13, 1948 (age 77); New York City, New York, U.S.
- Occupations: Actress; Producer; Model
- Years active: 1972–present
- Spouses: Sam McKeith; John Atchison (m. 2008)
- Children: Derek McKeith

Sheila Elaine Frazier (born November 13, 1948) is an American actress, producer, and model. Frazier is known for her role as Georgia in the 1972 crime drama film Super Fly. Frazier later reprised her role in the 1973 sequel, Super Fly T.N.T.

== Early life ==
Sheila Elaine Frazier was born in New York City to parents Dorothy Dennis and Eugene Cole Frazier. She spent her early years living on the Lower East Side of Manhattan and attended PS 97 until the age of ten, when she relocated with her mother to Englewood, New Jersey. There, she enrolled in the Liberty School. During her childhood, Frazier experienced a stutter, which contributed to her shyness. In sixth grade, a teacher attempted to help her overcome it by addressing the class before her presentation and stating, "I don't want any laughter. Sheila has a stutter." Frazier has mentioned that this introduction heightened her anxiety about public speaking.

In Englewood, her neighbors included, Clyde McPhatter, Van McCoy, The Isley Brothers, and Dolly and Jackie McLean. She went on to Dwight Morrow High School, where her classmates included Margaret Travolta, actress and sister of John Travolta. Despite Frazier's struggle with stuttering, she was inspired by Susan Hayward's performance in the film I'll Cry Tomorrow to pursue a career as an actress. After graduating from high school in 1966, aged 17, she moved to New York City, where she stayed with her godmother and found work as a secretary.

== Career ==
One day on the subway, a man approached Frazier and asked if she'd ever considered modelling. That chance encounter led her to do photo sessions with his boss, Bert Andrews. She began to do runway modeling and print work, but was not comfortable with that sort of attention. At some point, she met actor Richard Roundtree, who suggested she audition for the Negro Ensemble Company. Following his advice about focusing on the part she was playing, Frazier found she had overcome her stuttering. Five months later, she auditioned for the film Super Fly, winning the role of Georgia, the lead actress. She went on to work in many film and television productions, including Three the Hard Way. In 1980, she hosted a community affairs show on KNXT-TV in Los Angeles. She also worked as a story editor at Richard Pryor's Indigo Productions.

=== Film and television ===
Year	Title	Role	Notes
1972	Super Fly	Georgia	
1973	Super Fly T.N.T.	Georgia	
1973	Firehouse	Michelle Forsythe	ABC Movie of the Week
1974	The Super Cops	Sara	
1974	Three The Hard Way	Wendy Kane	
1977	Starsky and Hutch	Dr. Sammie Mason	Episode "Manchild on the Streets"
1978	California Suite	Bettina Panama	
1978	King	June	TV mini-series
1978	The Lazarus Syndrome	Gloria St. Clair	TV movie
1979	The Hitter	Lola	
1979	The Lazarus Syndrome	Gloria St. Clair	Episode "A Brutal Assault"
1981	Lou Grant	Beth MacDougall	Episode "Execution"
1982	The Phoenix	Mira	Episode "One of Them"
1982	Dallas	Miss Carpenter	Episode "Changing of the Guard"
1982	The Love Boat	Joyce Murdock	Episode "The Tomorrow Lady/Father, Dear Father/Still Life"
1983	Two of a Kind	Reporter	
1984	Hardcastle and McCormick	Newswoman	Episode "D-Day"
1985	Gimme a Break!	Yvonne Anderson	Episode "Friendship"
1985	Magnum, P.I.	Sheila Pennington	Episode "Round and Around"
1986	Cagney & Lacey	Reporter	Episode "Capitalism"
1988	227	Ida Dalton	Episode "The Roommate"
1990	1st & Ten: The Championship	Mabel	Episode "The Squeeze"
1999	The West Wing	Newscaster #2	Episode "Five Votes Down"
2000	The District	Mayor's Wife	Episode "The Jackal"
2001	All About You	Mrs. Tate	
2004	NCIS	Debra Green	5 episodes, 2004-2008
2006	The Last Stand	Dede's Mom	
2014	Being Mary Jane	Catherine Stafford	2 episodes

== Personal life ==
Frazier has been married twice and has one child. Frazier married evangelist minister John Atchison in early–2008 at Crenshaw Christian Center East in Manhattan, New York. Frazier's son, Derek McKeith is from her previous marriage to Sam McKeith. Frazier currently resides in New York.
