= Real Access =

American television series

- Genre: Entertainment news
- Written by: Mathew Baxt
- Presented by: Lauren Mayhew
- Country of origin: United States
- Original language: English
- No. of seasons: 1
- No. of episodes: Specials: 2; Half-hour episodes: 13

Production
- Executive producer: Rob Silverstein
- Producer: Kathy Samuels
- Camera setup: Videotape; Multi-camera
- Running time: 60 minutes (specials); 30 minutes
- Production companies: Access Entertainment News (NBC); The N Original Productions

Original release
- Network: Noggin; Nickelodeon
- Release: August 1, 2003 – May 6, 2004

Real Access is an entertainment news program for teenagers that ran for one season. It was produced by the NBC-owned company Access Entertainment News Productions, which also made Access Hollywood. Every episode is hosted by Lauren Mayhew and focuses on music, actors, and events related to television and film. The show aired on two channels owned by MTV Networks: Noggin (as part of its nighttime teen block, The N) and Nickelodeon.

The show consists of two hour-long specials and 13 half-hour episodes. The first special premiered on Noggin on August 1, 2003, and an encore showing was played on Nickelodeon on August 24. The second special aired on Noggin on December 31, 2003, and the rest of the show aired in early 2004.

== Format ==
The show placed an emphasis on interactivity, responding to viewer-submitted questions and comments. Most episodes rely on previous archived interviews and news clips. From time to time, host Lauren Mayhew gets to interview a few of the show's subjects. There are recurring segments in the episodes, like "Choose" ("this-or-that" questions), "ID Checkpoint" (the subjects reveal their driver's license pictures), and "Web Access" (other questions for guests that were submitted online).

== History ==
=== Production ===
The show was filmed from Times Square in New York City. According to Noggin's former vice president, Kenny Miller, the producers of Access Hollywood approached him with their idea to make a teen version of their series. In an interview for Variety, Miller said, "They came and found us, and we loved their idea...we're going a little deeper than what you would normally get, even on Access Hollywood."

=== Live tour ===
In December 2003, MTV Networks launched a live tour to promote the show, called the "Real Access Mall Tour," in malls across the United States. It featured interactive components like "The Real Access Studio," where visitors could play the role of an on-air host by interviewing celebrity lookalikes in front of a live camera, and then review their performance on The N's website; and "The Pamper Room," where visitors and shoppers could receive a massage, have their hair coifed, or face made up. Shoppers could also answer celebrity trivia questions to win prizes based on Real Access.

== Episodes ==
=== Specials (2003) ===
No.	Title	Original release date
1	"Justin and Christina"	August 1, 2003 (Noggin) August 24, 2003 (Nickelodeon)
2	"Top 24 in 2004"	December 31, 2003

=== Season 1 (2004) ===
No.	Title	Original release date
1	"Episode 1"	January 2, 2004
2	"Sibling Rivalry"	January 9, 2004
3	"Behind the Celebrity World"	January 16, 2004
4	"Foreign Invasion"	January 23, 2004
5	"Triple Threats"	January 30, 2004
6	"ABC's of Diva"	February 6, 2004
7	"Celebrity Sampler"	February 27, 2004
8	"2004's Top 10 Prime-Cut Hunks"	March 5, 2004
9	"Blonde Ambition"	March 12, 2004
10	"The Abode Show"	March 19, 2004
11	"Fashionistas"	March 26, 2004
12	"Cause Celebrities"	May 6, 2004
13	"Mister and Miss Behavin'"	May 6, 2004
