= On the Team =

American documentary television series

- Also known as: Noggin's On the Team
- Genre: Documentary; Baseball
- Created by: Lisa Wood Shapiro
- Composer: Chris Hajian
- Country of origin: United States
- Original language: English
- No. of seasons: 1
- No. of episodes: 13

Production
- Executive producers: Lisa Wood Shapiro; Gus Reyes
- Producers: Tom Ascheim; Maude Chilton; Tom Donahue; Jarret Engle
- Production locations: Brooklyn, New York
- Editor: Jill Schweitzer
- Camera setup: Videotape; Multi-camera
- Running time: 30 minutes
- Production companies: Hitchhiker Films; Stolen Car Productions

Original release
- Network: Noggin
- Release: January 30 – April 24, 2001

On the Team is an American documentary television series produced for the Noggin channel. It covers the experiences of a youth baseball team in Brooklyn as they prepare for the 2000 playoff games. The series premiered on Noggin on January 30, 2001. It started airing on Noggin's sister channel, Nickelodeon, on May 2, 2001. It was created by Lisa Wood Shapiro and executive-produced by Shapiro and Gus Reyes.

The show was first announced by Variety in November 2000. According to an article in The New York Times, the idea stemmed from Lisa Wood Shapiro's wish to create a "cinéma vérité for kids." She spent the summer of 2000 scouting different teams, looking for a group that demonstrated team spirit. Shapiro eventually chose the Camp Friendship Panthers, a team that played at Brooklyn's Prospect Park. Noggin greenlit a thirteen-episode series based on the team because the network "wanted a program about real kids doing real things." Ahead of the show's premiere, former New York Mets player John Franco hosted promotional events for On the Team.

On the Team debuted during Noggin's primetime block, The Hubbub, which was designed to allow viewers to interact with the show as it aired. Viewer comments were played live during interstitials and after each broadcast. The show was aimed at pre-teens. Critical response to the series was positive, with The Los Angeles Times calling it "unexpectedly compelling true storytelling" and The Star Democrat calling it better than most new adult documentaries at the time.

== Plot ==
The show chronicles the triumphs and tribulations of a diverse coed team of 9- and 10-year-old baseball players in Brooklyn as they learn to be a team, deal with hard work, and face disappointment. The team has 20 members: nine girls and 11 boys.

The team is led by their coach Bobby Gari, who played for the Panthers back in the 1980s, and his assistant Mr. Cruz (always called "Mr. C"), who tries to be a calming voice in the children's frenetic world. The players include Stephanie, the daughter of Mr. C and an ace pitcher; Jarian, the team's best hitter; Jarra, a right fielder who is high-spirited and friends with everyone on the team; Christine, a left fielder who tries to be the team's personal cheering section; Jordan, who is stuck in a midseason batting slump; Kevin, Jordan's best friend who is better at batting; Aida, who wants to be a pitcher but has trouble throwing; and Justin, who plays short-stop and outfield.

== History ==
=== Production ===
The show was created by Lisa Wood Shapiro. She likened the concept to "The Real World meets The Bad News Bears." In an interview for The New York Times, she said "I definitely wanted to do some kind of cinéma vérité for kids, and I knew I wanted to do a sport. I was on a Little League baseball team [as a kid] and I was the only girl, and it was horrible. I always regretted that I didn't do sports more." She chose baseball and spent the summer of 2000 searching for a baseball team that demonstrated team spirit. She chose the Camp Friendship Panthers because, while they were far from the best team, they all enjoyed playing and treated each other as friends.

The crew spent over 100 hours taping the show, from tryouts to the final trophy day. The Panthers were a racially and ethnically diverse group from modest urban backgrounds. Tom Ascheim, the general manager of Noggin, said to the New York Daily News: "They live in a very real, urban society. We don't talk about it, we just show it." Ascheim hoped that, after watching the series, children in other parts of the country would empathize with their urban counterparts.

Gus Reyes executive-produced the series alongside Shapiro. Tom Donahue was a producer, and the show was edited by Reyes and Donahue's production company, Stolen Car Productions. Music for the show was composed and performed in Queens, New York, by Chris Hajian.

=== Broadcast ===
The series aired as part of The Hubbub, Noggin's primetime programming block. Premieres aired Tuesdays through Thursdays at 7:30 p.m. The Hubbub allowed viewers to interact with the show as it aired. Viewers could log onto Noggin's website, Noggin.com, to submit comments and questions about the show. These comments were played live during interstitials and after each episode.

On May 2, 2001, Nickelodeon started airing On the Team on its main channel as well. Nickelodeon aired it from May until June 22, 2001. In April 2002, Noggin changed its lineup to add a block called The N, which included all of its tween and teen-oriented shows. On the Team was deemed to "skew old enough to fit the new mandate," and it was announced by Kidscreen that the show would move to a new timeslot on The N. Reruns aired during The N until December 21, 2003.

=== Promotions ===
Former New York Mets player John Franco hosted a promotional event for On the Team in January 2001, celebrating the upcoming launch of the show. The series was previously announced by the magazine Variety on November 8, 2000. One of Noggin's parent companies, Viacom, first registered the show as a trademark on September 11, 2000.

Noggin heavily featured the show on their website in mid-2001. It created a "Fantasy Baseball League" game to coincide with On the Team, which featured segments called "Rules of Baseball" and "Baseball Lingo." In mid-2001, the top ten players of the game won a Noggin package of prizes. The top 100 players were inducted into an online list of players called the On the Team Hall of Fame. The Noggin site also included an element called "On the Team's Calculator" which allowed sport players to catalogue their scores.

== Episodes ==
The show has 13 episodes in total. The first episode features three intertwined stories: Coach Bobby stressing the importance of commitment during batting practice, Stephanie visiting her grandparents, and Aida trying to prove that she can become the team pitcher.

Episodes
No.	Title	Original air date
1	"The Making of a Ball Player"	January 30, 2001
2	"Picking the Panthers"	January 31, 2001
3	"Becoming a Team"	February 13, 2001
4	"Practice in Life"	February 20, 2001
5	"Everyone's Friend"	February 27, 2001
6	"Picking the All Stars"	March 6, 2001
7	"To Quit or Not to Quit"	March 13, 2001
8	"Striking Out"	March 20, 2001
9	"Practice Makes Perfect"	March 27, 2001
10	"It's Only a Game"	April 3, 2001
11	"Making the Grade"	April 10, 2001
12	"The Re-Match"	April 17, 2001
13	"Trophy Day"	April 24, 2001

== Reception ==
Critical response to the series was positive. Lynne Heffley of Los Angeles Times praised the show, calling it "unexpectedly compelling true storytelling" that "scores" in comparison to Big Kids, a British co-production that also aired on Noggin. Heffley enjoyed the show's multi-layered approach to portraying both physical and emotional sides of baseball, writing that "drama, suspense and human interest are captured in the camera's eye ... there's dimension as well as action aplenty." In an article for The Star Democrat, Evan Levine of the Newspaper Enterprise Association called the show better than most adult documentaries at the time, adding: "witness On the Team...they go from being the underdogs to a cohesive group of players, and the series will interest viewers most when it chronicles how the change came about. Viewers will also enjoy identifying with the different players."
