= Bob Books =

American children's book series

Bob Books, written by Bobby Lynn Maslen and illustrated by John R. Maslen, are a series of children’s books designed to teach reading skills acquisition. With a foundation in phonics methods, each level addresses a single stage in a child’s reading development.

Sets in the series include:

- Bob Books Set 1: Beginning Readers (ISBN 0-439-17545-3) introduces short vowels and three-letter words.
- Bob Books Set 2: Advanced Beginners (ISBN 0-439-84502-5) uses three-letter words and vowel sounds in slightly longer stories.
- Bob Books Set 3: Word Families (ISBN 0-439-84509-2) includes consonant blends, endings and a few sight words.
- Bob Books Set 4: Compound Words (ISBN 0-439-84506-8) includes new word blends, more sight words and longer multi syllable words.
- Bob Books Set 5: Long Vowels (ISBN 0-439-86541-7) introduces long vowels and the silent E.
- My First Bob Books: Pre-Reading Skills (ISBN 978-0545019224) teaches reading foundation skills: shapes, patterns and sequencing.
- My First Bob Books: Alphabet (ISBN 978-0545019217) teaches phonemic awareness, written to help tune children's ears to the sounds letters make.
- Bob Books Sight Words: Kindergarten (ISBN 978-0545019231) introduces sight words at the kindergarten level.
- Bob Books Sight Words: First Grade (ISBN 978-0545019248) introduces 30 additional sight words at the first grade level.

Each set is organized into stages: Reading Readiness, Stage 1: Starting to Read, Stage 2: Emerging Reader and Stage 3: Developing Reader.

== History ==
Bobby Lynn Maslen and John Maslen created Bob Books, first published in 1976.

Author Bobby Lynn Maslen was involved in cooperative preschool education for nine years and then became a teacher of 3-5 year-olds at a private school in Portland, Oregon. It was there that she created the Bob Books.

Illustrator John Maslen is a watercolor painter and architect. He holds signature status in the National Watercolor Society and several other art organizations. He also received an American Institute of Architects Honor Award.

The first Bob Books were individually hand-drawn for Bobby Lynn Maslen's students. When it became too cumbersome to make books for each child, she persuaded the school to print 300 copies. This eventually led to more sets, a cottage industry and self publishing.

The Bob Books became a Children’s Book of the Month Club selection and the series was adopted by home-schoolers and Montessori teachers. In 1993 USA Today ran a story about the Bob Books. “By that time we knew the potential was much more than we could handle ourselves.” Scholastic Inc. became their publisher in 1994.
