= Girls v. Boys =

- Also known as: GVB
- Genre: Game show Competition
- Written by: Vinny Montello; Scott Sonneborn
- Directed by: Elaine Frontain Bryant; John Chiappardi; Steven Lerner
- Presented by: Ursula Abbott; Dave B.; Joe Hayes; Jess Muniz; Pooch Hall
- Country of origin: United States
- Original language: English
- No. of seasons: 4

Production
- Producer: Steven Lerner
- Running time: 30 minutes (with commercials)
- Production company: Dancing Toad Productions

Original release
- Network: The N (Noggin)
- Release: August 8, 2003 – October 7, 2005

Girls v. Boys, also known as GVB, is an American game show that aired on Noggin's teen programming block, The N. It was produced by Noggin LLC and Dancing Toad Productions, the same team that collaborated with Noggin to produce A Walk in Your Shoes. The show aired from August 8, 2003 to October 7, 2005. GVB pits teams of adolescent boys and girls against each other in physical competitions for the chance to score points and win prizes. The series had four seasons: GVB: Tampa, GVB: Hawaii, GVB: Montana, and GVB: Puerto Rico.

== The Games ==
Before the games started, anyone between the ages of 16 and 18 are asked to audition. The show then shows the competitions as well as the debacles between the two teams, both internally and externally. The games consisted of physical competitions as well as acts of sabotage such as during baking contests. The purpose of the competitions is to attain a prize (it has varied from season to season, but in Puerto Rico it was $50,000 for the winning team and $1,000 worth of travel gear split between the winning team members). Each competition earns the winners of the competition a set number of points (ranging from 100 to over 500 in the final event) and the team that earns the most points wins.

The first game was set in Tampa and had three girls and three boys on opposite teams. They stayed at a summer camp.

The second game was set in Hawaii and also had three girls and three boys on opposite teams. However, Lauren Collins and Jake Epstein also make appearances. This season also introduced the teams staying at vacation houses.

The third game during the span of 11 episodes was set in rural Montana and had expanded the competitors to non-celebrity teams of four girls and four boys on opposite teams. The contestants were expected to constantly talk about winning the game, by chanting the phrase "Fresh Money" with a specific accent. Also, in episode 8 Colleen Kirk and Jose Gonzalez appeared to get in a verbal dispute with the rest of the episodes focusing on the consequences of the dispute. This was part of the script as none of the contestants were disqualified.

The fourth and final game during the span of 10 episodes was set in Puerto Rico and the format changed yet again. There were four girls and four boys but they were no longer opposite each other. Three girls and one boy were competing against one girl and three boys. This happened during the span of episodes 4, 5, and 6 where the contestants were told to vote one girl and one boy. It was revealed to be a gimmick when Paris Hoover and Ryder Darcy were "voted out" but then they returned but this time they switched teams.

== Cast ==
- Ursula Abbott
- Dave B.

=== Season 1 (Florida) ===
- Mikey Maher
- Marcus Polo
- Skylar
- Sam
- Marilyn
- Vicky

=== Season 2 (Hawaii) ===
- Teri Onoda
- Kris Brown
- Justin Simmons
- Dina Mazariegos
- Christina Campfield
- Jessica Huggins
- Jake Epstein
- Lauren Collins

=== Season 3 (Montana) ===
- Matt Johnson
- Jose Gonzalez
- Allen Justice
- Frank Chad Muniz
- Monica Estrada
- Ming Peiffer
- Colleen Kirk
- Shannon Bean
- Joe Hayes

=== Season 4 (Puerto Rico) ===
- Cory Dodds
- Ryder Darcy
- Ace Griffin
- Demian Martinez
- Kelley Primc
- Paris Hoover
- Krystal Harris
- Jia Tolentino
- Jess Muniz
- Pooch Hall

== In popular culture ==
Season 4 cast member Jia Tolentino devoted one of the essays in her best-selling book "Trick Mirror: Reflections on Self-Delusion" to a re-evaluation and recollection of her time on the show.
