= Derek McKeith =

American musician

Derek McKeith is an American singer, songwriter and music producer whose sound and style is sometimes compared to Lenny Kravitz and Prince. Born in New York City to William Morris agent Sam McKeith, who had helped guide the early careers of Stevie Wonder and Bruce Springsteen, and actress/producer Sheila Frazier, McKeith moved to Los Angeles with his mother, where he began his music career aspirations. In 2009, he produced his debut album, Signature, which received moderate airplay, while over 80 percent of the album's sales were made over the Internet. McKeith has also received accolades for his live shows at B.B. King's in New York, and The Roxy Theater in West Hollywood, as well as by the website Soul-Patrol.com.
