= Kinderwood =

2020 American TV kids series

- Genre: Mystery; Adventure
- Created by: Otto Tang
- Developed by: Carin Greenberg
- Directed by: Allison Craig
- Theme music composer: Gabe Sokoloff; Otto Tang
- Composer: Gabe Sokoloff
- Country of origin: United States
- Original language: English
- No. of seasons: 1
- No. of episodes: 30

Production
- Running time: 6-7 minutes
- Production company: Titmouse, Inc.

Original release
- Network: Noggin
- Release: December 3, 2020 – April 6, 2021

Kinderwood is an American animated series that premiered on the Noggin mobile app on December 3, 2020. The series was created by Otto Tang and developed by Carin Greenberg. It is produced by Titmouse, Inc. It is set in a fictional school called Kinderwood, which is able to transform into different environments. The main characters are the "Kinderkids," a group of five classmates who attend Kinderwood.

The series was first announced on December 1, 2020, and it was available early on Noggin's Amazon Video channel on the same day. On December 3, one episode of the series aired on Nickelodeon to promote its debut on Noggin. Commercials for the show's Noggin debut also played on Nickelodeon's networks.

== Characters ==
The five main characters are known as the "Kinderkids."

- Liddo (voiced by Judah Prehn) is a white cat with a black bowler hat that obscures his ears.
- Fifi (voiced by Chloe Coleman) is a shy and detail-oriented black and white dog.
- Luplup (voiced by Luke Lowe) is a sweet, loving, yellow-and-white dog and Fifi's little brother.
- Olive (voiced by Capri Oliver) is a white duck who is the most curious and imaginative Kinderkid.
- DD (vocal effects provided by Otto Tang) is an always stylish black and white cat who doesn't speak and only meows. He also expresses himself through thought balloons which the characters can see.

== Episodes ==
All episodes were directed by Allison Craig.

No.	Title	Written by	Original release date	Television air date	Prod. code	U.S. linear viewers (millions)
1	"Fifi's Balloon Dance"	Written by : Carin Greenberg; Storyboarded by : Thomas Hudson	December 3, 2020	May 28, 2021	101A	0.11
2	"Lovey Story"	Written by : Carin Greenberg; Storyboarded by : David Wachtenheim	December 3, 2020	TBA	101B	N/A
3	"A Star is Horn"	Written by : Carin Greenberg; Storyboarded by : Lauren Bergholm	December 3, 2020	May 28, 2021	101C	0.11
4	"What Sounds Like Thunder"	Written by : Shane Portman; Storyboarded by : Allyson Gonzalez	December 3, 2020	June 4, 2021	102A	N/A
5	"Dandy Dandelion"	Written by : David Grubstick; Storyboarded by : Thomas Hudson	December 3, 2020	June 4, 2021	102B	N/A
6	"Beetle Buddy"	Written by : Allan Neuwirth; Storyboarded by : David Wachtenheim	December 3, 2020	TBA	TBA	N/A
7	"A Hat Like That"	Written by : Jeff Goode; Storyboarded by : Allyson Gonzalez	December 3, 2020	TBA	103A	N/A
8	"The Amazing Green Canyon"	Written by : Eric Branscum; Storyboarded by : Allyson Gonzalez	December 3, 2020	TBA	103B	N/A
9	"Luplup and the Missing Moon"	Story by : David Grubstick & Gabe Pulliam; Teleplay by : David Grubstick; Storyboarded by : David Wachtenheim	December 3, 2020	June 11, 2021	103C	0.12
10	"Sluglup"	Written by : Andrew Blanchette; Storyboarded by : Lauren Bergholm	December 3, 2020	TBA	104A	N/A
11	"Out of the Blocks"	Written by : Don Gillies; Storyboarded by : Lauren Bergholm	December 3, 2020	TBA	104B	N/A
12	"Silent Story"	Written by : Eric Branscum; Storyboarded by : Thomas Hudson	December 3, 2020	TBA	104C	N/A
13	"Luplup's Big Sister"	Written by : Don Gillies; Storyboarded by : Lauren Bergholm	April 6, 2021	TBA	105A	N/A
14	"Clean Up Round Up"	Written by : Eric Branscum; Storyboarded by : Lauren Bergholm	April 6, 2021	TBA	105B	N/A
15	"It's About Time"	Written by : David Grubstick; Storyboarded by : David Wachtenheim	April 6, 2021	TBA	105C	N/A
16	"A Kinderwood Holiday"	Written by : David Grubstick; Storyboarded by : Thomas Hudson	December 3, 2020	December 3, 2020	106A	0.33
17	"Snowball Effect"	Written by : Andrew Blanchette; Storyboarded by : Allyson Gonzalez	December 3, 2020	December 3, 2020	106B	0.33
18	"Hop to the Top"	Written by : Andrew Blanchette; Storyboarded by : Lauren Bergholm	December 3, 2020	December 3, 2020	106C	0.33
19	"Olive Spins a Yarn"	Written by : Allan Neuwirth; Storyboarded by : Thomas Hudson	April 6, 2021	TBA	107A	N/A
20	"Two Can Play"	Written by : David Grubstick; Storyboarded by : Allyson Gonzalez	April 6, 2021	TBA	107B	N/A
21	"Friendship Day"	Written by : Kris Marvin Hughes; Storyboarded by : Allyson Gonzalez	April 6, 2021	TBA	107C	N/A
22	"A Day Without DD"	Written by : Shane Portman; Storyboarded by : David Wachtenheim	April 6, 2021	TBA	108A	N/A
23	"Train Gain"	Written by : Eric Branscum; Storyboarded by : Thomas Hudson	April 6, 2021	TBA	TBA	N/A
24	"The Island of Lost Treasure"	Written by : Kris Marvin Hughes; Storyboarded by : David Wachtenheim	April 6, 2021	June 11, 2021	TBA	0.12
25	"A Fish Tale"	Written by : David Grubstick; Storyboarded by : David Wachtenheim	April 6, 2021	TBA	TBA	N/A
26	"The Trouble with Scribbles"	Written by : Jacob Goldfine; Storyboarded by : Lauren Bergholm	April 6, 2021	TBA	TBA	N/A
27	"The Tap Trap"	Written by : Melinda LaRose; Storyboarded by : David Wachtenheim	April 6, 2021	TBA	TBA	N/A
28	"The Spring Chicken"	Written by : Don Gillies; Storyboarded by : Allyson Gonzalez	April 6, 2021	TBA	TBA	N/A
29	"Fruit Route"	Written by : James Bates; Storyboarded by : Thomas Hudson	April 6, 2021	TBA	TBA	N/A
30	"The Butterfly Effect"	Written by : David Grubstick; Storyboarded by : Thomas Hudson	April 6, 2021	TBA	TBA	N/A

== Reception ==
Common Sense Media gave the show a five-star review. The staff reviewer, Ashley Moulton, said that the show's stories "emphasize that it's okay to feel negative emotions, that it's important to help other people, and being a good friend," and she summarized Kinderwood as a "lovely, kind-hearted show" with "oodles of charm."

The episode "What Sounds Like Thunder" was selected to compete in the Television Films category of the 2021 Annecy International Animation Film Festival.
