= Sesame Street syndication packages =

Two syndication packages of Sesame Street episodes, titled Sesame Street Unpaved and 123 Sesame Street, were produced by the Noggin cable channel in 1999. At the time, Sesame Workshop co-owned Noggin and many of the company's older programs were replayed on the channel. Unpaved aired until 2002, and 123 aired until 2005.

The digital release began on July 10, 2011, on Apple's iTunes Store (now accessible via Apple TV). Rather than releasing full, consecutive seasons, the "Classics" volumes bundled legendary curated episodes from the show's earliest decades, covering the timeframe from Season 1 through Season 25.

== Sesame Street Unpaved ==
Series intertitle

Sesame Street Unpaved features select episodes from the series' first twenty seasons. The 67-episode package includes every season premiere of Sesame Street with the exception of the season sixteen premiere. Each installment consists of a remastered version of an older episode, normally trimmed and edited to allow time for commercials. Episodes open with an exclusive title sequence created specifically for Unpaved, which depicts the characters on a busy New York street and was shot on-location in the borough of Queens. The package was partially marketed towards older viewers who would watch the program based on nostalgia. Most later broadcasts on Noggin paired Unpaved with fellow Sesame Workshop series 3-2-1 Contact, making up a two-hour timeslot.

A documentary with the same name, created to celebrate Sesame Street's thirtieth year on television, premiered on TV Land on December 8, 1999, to promote the Noggin channel's "retro" shows. Unlike all other installments, it was created in a clip show format; scenes from a variety of hallmark episodes were featured instead of content from a single episode, and original footage starring five of the program's original cast members – Loretta Long, Sonia Manzano, Bob McGrath, Martin P. Robinson and Caroll Spinney – was added as a framing device. These segments were written and produced by Josh Selig. Robinson (Mr. Snuffleupagus and Slimey the Worm) and Spinney (Big Bird and Oscar) were the only Muppet performers who appeared as themselves.

== 123 Sesame Street ==
123 Sesame Street repackages episodes from the seasons 25, 30 and 31. Its title is derived from the fictional address of the franchise's titular location. Unlike Unpaved, this package was explicitly aimed at preschoolers. It was used as a way to introduce a new generation of viewers to older episodes that still managed to meet modern educational standards. Many installments of this package were incorporated into marathons and events consisting of otherwise brand-new content.

123 Sesame Street also debuted in 1999. Unlike Unpaved, it was never shown on TV Land and regularly broadcast twice a day on Noggin. When the Noggin channel was restructured in spring 2002, and many CTW/Sesame Workshop programs were dropped from its regular schedule, 123 Sesame Street replaced all other airings of Sesame Street content (with the exception of Play with Me Sesame). The package continued to air until August 28, 2005, about three years after Unpaved was removed.

== Sesame Street Classics ==
Sesame Street Classics is documented as a collection of vintage episodes packaged by Sesame Workshop for digital download and streaming platforms.

The initial 2011 Apple/iTunes release consisted of 12 complete episodes spanning Seasons 1, 10, and 20, alongside two bonus behind-the-scenes features.

Following this release, subsequent digital collections on Apple TV/iTunes cataloged iconic milestones extending directly to Season 25 (1993–1994)—which marked the show's 25th anniversary and featured historic segments like Bert and Ernie's "Banana Telephone" skit and Roosevelt Franklin.

These specific bundles were later grouped under Sesame Street TVOD (Transactional Video on Demand) on Muppet Wiki, as the episodes shifted across platforms over time to include Amazon, Google Play, and streaming networks.

== Development ==
Plans to create Sesame Street syndication packages for Noggin had existed since April 1998, when Sesame Workshop and Nickelodeon first invested in the company. The Workshop initially considered repackaging Sesame segments into themed collections, rather than airing modified cuts of individual episodes. Herb Scannell (who was the president of Nickelodeon and TV Land at the time) suggested centering a package around Elmo, a breakout character whose popularity had peaked in the late 1990s. While describing such possibilities for an interview with The New York Times, he mentioned "[CTW] could do 'The Elmo Show,' for example."
