= Doug Preis =

American voice actor

- Born: Doug Preis
- Occupation: Voice actor
- Years active: 1986–present
- Agent: Peter Varano
- Notable credit(s): Doug; Phred on Your Head Show; The URL with Phred Show
- Website: http://www.dougpreis.com

Doug Preis is an American voice actor, best known for his role as Phil Funnie, Chalky Studebaker, Willie White, Walter "Skunky" Beaumont, Bill Bluff, and Vice Principal Lamarr Bone on Doug.

== Roles ==
- Doug - Mr. Phil Funnie, Chalky Studebaker, Willie White, Skunky Beaumont, Monroe Yoder and Clyde ("Chap") Lipman (both of The Beets), Mr. Bill Bluff, and Mr. Lamarr Bone
- Hoyt 'n Andy's Sports Bender - Hoyt
- Phred on Your Head Show - Phred, Big Voice
- The URL with Phred Show - Phred, Big Voice
- PB&J Otter - Redolfo
- The World of Tosh - Ralph Anderson/Elderly Man (in the episode "How Termitey Have Fallen") (English dub, uncredited)
- Cartoon Network - Announcer (2002–04)
- Lucky Charms - Lucky the Leprechaun
- ThunderCats - Alluro, Lynx-O
- Vlasic Pickles - Jovny the Stork
- Adventures of the Galaxy Rangers - Shane Gooseman, Nimrod the Cat
- Adult Swim - Announcer
- Harvey Birdman, Attorney at Law - Thundarr the Barbarian, Beegle Beagle
- Animals United - Hunter
