= A Walk in Your Shoes =

- Genre: Educational
- Written by: Amy Lehr; Eric Maierson
- Country of origin: United States
- Original language: English
- No. of seasons: 3
- No. of episodes: 42 (+3 shorts)

Production
- Executive producers: Amy Friedman; Steven Lerner
- Producers: Elaine Frontain Bryant; John Chiappardi; Leila Lafi
- Editor: Anna Pivarnik
- Production company: Bullfrog Productions

Original release
- Network: Noggin
- Release: October 25, 1999 – October 18, 2005

A Walk in Your Shoes is an American educational television series that aired on the Noggin channel. The show documents the experiences of two different people who switch places for a day and learn how the other person lives. The show started out as a series of three shorts, which premiered on October 25, 1999, as part of Noggin's variety series Phred on Your Head Show. The first half-hour episode premiered on April 30, 2000, and the last episode aired on October 18, 2005.

The show was originally aimed at pre-teens. By its third season, it had become a "serious-minded teenage documentary," with episodes about topics like homelessness, teen pregnancy, living with HIV/AIDS, and the aftermath of Hurricane Katrina. From 2002 to 2005, the show was a fixture of Noggin's nighttime programming block The N. Noggin called A Walk in Your Shoes "The N's signature series."

The show was critically acclaimed. The episode "Living with HIV/AIDS" won a Peabody Award and a Robert Wood Johnson Foundation Award. The episode "Teen Parent" won a Sexual Health in Entertainment Award. The third season was also the recipient of a Parents' Choice Award.

== Background ==
=== History ===
Noggin's general manager, Tom Ascheim, described the show's premise: "we take people of different backgrounds and lives and have them swap. And then we have them show us the conclusions they draw themselves." Before each episode was filmed, Noggin staff members first proposed a topic for a new "switch"—such as two different races, music styles, or religions—then researched the topic. If they decided that a switch was both doable and educational, they started looking for a pair of individuals to switch. Ascheim said "We try to find kids who seem natural and talk easily." Once an episode's stars were chosen, Noggin hired experts on the topic as consultants. For example, for the episode "Catholic / Jewish," interfaith experts Rabbi Marc Gellman and Monsignor Tom Hartman (commentators known as "The God Squad") served as consultants. The show's educational goals were developed with the curriculum standards set forth by the National Council for the Social Studies.

A Walk in Your Shoes started out as a series of three short-form episodes. These shorts were tested as part of Noggin's variety series Phred on Your Head Show from October 25–29, 1999. According to a press release from Noggin, the show "received a strong response from kids when it debuted in short-form," which led them to order a season of 13 long-form episodes. Two of the shorts were combined to make up one long-form episode ("City / Country & Circus / Suburb"), and the other short was appended to a separate long-form episode ("Big Boss / 4th Grader & Candy Store / Summer Camp").

The first season premiered on the main Nickelodeon channel on April 30, 2000. It aired on Noggin one day later, on May 1. Several other episodes were simulcast on both Noggin and Nickelodeon. The show eventually ran for three seasons. In 2003, Noggin planned to make a fourth season and allowed viewers to submit their own ideas for future episodes. Noggin announced: "We have just finished filming our 3rd season of AWIYS and are accepting ideas for future switches." The fourth season did not end up being made.

=== Premise ===
Each episode documents the experiences of two different people who switch places for a day and learn how the other person lives. As the two subjects express their thoughts and impressions on camera, as well as in online diaries on Noggin's website, they learn to appreciate diverse perspectives. The show was designed to help viewers get a first-hand look at how people from different backgrounds and perspectives see the world.

== Episodes ==
=== Shorts (1999) ===
The show began as a series of three shorts, shown as part of Noggin's Phred on Your Head Show. When A Walk in Your Shoes started its first long-form season, two of the shorts were combined to make up one long-form episode ("City / Country & Circus / Suburb"), and the other short was appended to a separate episode ("Big Boss / 4th Grader & Candy Store / Summer Camp").

- City / Country (October 25, 1999)
- Candy Store / Summer Camp (October 26, 1999)
- Circus / Suburb (October 27, 1999)

=== Season 1 (2000–01) ===
- 1. Alaska / Hawaii (April 30, 2000)
- 2. City / Country & Circus / Suburb (May 8, 2000)
- 3. Wheelchair (May 15, 2000)
- 4. Candy Store / Camp & Big Boss / 4th Grader (May 22, 2000)
- 5. Student / Principal (May 29, 2000)
- 6. Military Academy / Commune (July 31, 2000)
- 7. Desert / Water (August 28, 2000)
- 8. Cattle Drive / All That (September 18, 2000)
- 9. Religion (December 17, 2000)
- 10. Juvenile Home (November 13, 2000)
- 11. Inter-Generational (December 4, 2000)
- 12. Boy / Girl (January 29, 2001)
- 13. Big Family / Only Child (February 26, 2001)

=== Season 2 (2001–02) ===
- 14. Boston / Bombay (April 16, 2001)
- 15. Blind (April 23, 2001)
- 16. Reunion Special (May 28, 2001)
- 17. CBS Celebrity (July 2, 2001)
- 18. Moscow / NY (August 6, 2001)
- 19. Deaf (October 2, 2001)
- 20. Same Name (October 9, 2001)
- 21. Mother / Son & Father / Daughter (May 6, 2002)
- 22. Asian / Latin (October 9, 2001)
- 23. Cheerleader Camp / Science Camp (December 10, 2001)
- 24. Aaron Carter (October 29, 2001)
- 25. Muslim (February 10, 2002)
- 26. Rap / Country (July 14, 2002)

=== Season 3 (2002–05) ===
- 27. Extreme Sports / Traditional Sports (May 13, 2002)
- 28. Body Image (October 13, 2002)
- 29. Jock / Music Geek (May 27, 2002)
- 30. Rodeo / Beauty Pageant (June 2, 2002)
- 31. Hip Hop / Ballet (June 17, 2002)
- 32. Teen Parent (June 24, 2002)
- 33. Urban / Rural (January 24, 2003)
- 34. NASCAR (February 16, 2003)
- 35. Homeless (February 24, 2003)
- 36. Spirit / Anti-Spirit (March 6, 2003)
- 37. Jordan / America (March 11, 2003)
- 38. MC Battle / Debate Team (November 7, 2003)
- 39. Living with HIV/AIDS (December 1, 2003)
- 40. Girly Girl / Tomboy (April 19, 2004)
- 41. Rainforest (April 26, 2004)
- 42. Katrina's Aftermath (October 18, 2005)

== Home media ==
There were four home video releases of A Walk in Your Shoes. The show was first released to VHS in 2000, when Noggin released several episodes onto a video called A Walk in Your Shoes: Disabilities Teaching Awareness Kit. Two more episodes, "Living with HIV/AIDS" and "Teen Parent", were released as separate VHS tapes in 2003. The episode "Muslim" was released to DVD in 2005.

== Reception ==
The series was critically acclaimed. In 2001, Aaron Barnhart of the Albuquerque Journal said that A Walk in Your Shoes "might be the best new educational show on TV." Evan Levine of the Newspaper Enterprise Association said that A Walk in Your Shoes "can be terrific viewing for preteens and teens – especially if you watch with them," calling the show "a great opportunity to see glimpses of other people's lives, and to see how other people have misconceptions that are usually broken down." In a review of the episode "Muslim," Alexandra Hoyt of Asbury Park Press said that the show "is full of touching moments and answers questions that develop insight, knowledge and common bonds." Journalist Rob Owen called the show's religious-themed episodes a welcome and timely change in Nickelodeon's lineup, highlighting its positive depictions of multiple religions as rare for children's television.

The San Diego Union-Tribune urged its readers to watch the series, writing: "You might want to park the whole family in front of the TV at 8:30. Tune to Nickelodeon and settle in for a half hour that will stay with everyone far longer. The program is A Walk in Your Shoes and it's your heart, not your feet, that is likely to ache when it's over." Nancy Wellons of the Orlando Sentinel called the show an "illuminating entry into reality TV" for Noggin. SFGate's Tim Goodman pointed to A Walk in Your Shoes as an example of Noggin's best programming, calling it "thoughtfully produced" compared to other tween shows.

The episode "Living with HIV/AIDS" received two awards: a Peabody Award and a Robert Wood Johnson Foundation Award. The episode "Teen Parent" won a Sexual Health in Entertainment Award. The third-season episode "NASCAR" received a Parents' Choice Silver Award.
