= The N =

Programming block on the Noggin television channel

- The prelaunch logo for The N
- Network: Noggin (2002–07)
- Launched: April 1, 2002; 24 years ago (as a programming block) (Note: When the Noggin channel launched, tweens were its main audience, and it aired an untitled lineup of tween shows. The N was an extension and rebranding of this previous block.); December 31, 2007; 18 years ago (as a television channel)
- Closed: December 31, 2007; 18 years ago (as a programming block on most providers); May 6, 2009; 17 years ago (Dish) (Note: The block moved from Noggin to a new channel on December 31, 2007, except on Dish Network until May 6, 2009. Like on Noggin, the new channel limited The N's series and branding to a nighttime block; a block of TEENick series aired during the daytime.); September 28, 2009; 17 years ago (as a television channel)
- Country of origin: United States
- Owner: MTV Networks; Sesame Workshop (2002)
- Format: Educational and personal development series
- Running time: 12 hours (2002–07); 24 hours (2007–09)
- Original language: English
- Official website: the-n.com

The N (standing for Noggin) was an overnight programming block on the Noggin television channel, aimed at preteens (tweens) and teenagers. It was launched on April 1, 2002, by MTV Networks (now Paramount Media Networks) and Sesame Workshop.

Before the block's introduction, Noggin's daytime lineup included tween-aimed shows such as A Walk in Your Shoes, Sponk! and Big Kids. In 2002, Noggin restructured its daytime lineup to cater to preschool children. From then onward, the shows targeted to older children only aired during the night as part of The N.

The N focused on shows that promoted personal development, and the block was described as "an educational twin" of Nickelodeon's teen blocks. The N's original shows were created with educational goals, which was uncommon for teen programming at the time. The block was managed by the same team that made Noggin's preschool shows; the team considered it a challenge to focus on both preschoolers and an older audience at the same time, but they felt that Noggin and The N had a consistent, unified brand identity because both were educational. To create shows for The N, Noggin created research groups to determine their shows' topics. They decided to create shows that educated older children for their futures through cautionary tales, life lessons, and realistic depictions of growing up.

In August 2002, Sesame Workshop sold its stake in Noggin, but it continued to produce shows for Noggin and The N, including Out There. The N launched a variety of spin-off media, such as live events and a soundtrack album. From 2007 to 2009, the block was moved from Noggin to a new channel, which carried TEENick programming throughout the day and relegated The N's content to a block at night. In September 2009, TEENick and The N were merged to form TeenNick. The TeenNick channel was based on TEENick's branding and shows, and The N's programming was completely removed by 2015. According to Polygon, "Nickelodeon began phasing out The N's programming and replacing it with TEENick, an entertainment block with no educational curriculum and zero involvement from Noggin. The N lost its footing by 2009, and both [The N] and its website closed down completely."

== History ==
=== Origins ===
The Noggin channel launched on February 2, 1999. When Noggin started, many of its shows were aimed at tweens. One of the channel's goals was to "dispel the conventional wisdom that educational programming is not entertaining enough to attract pre-teens and young adults." The channel aired three blocks: a main block of tween shows throughout the day, a block for preschoolers in the early morning, and a block of "adult retro" series at night. The nighttime block received low ratings. Noggin's most notable effort to increase its nighttime viewership was a primetime block called The Hubbub, which allowed viewers to send comments through Noggin's website and see them on TV. Ratings never improved, and The New York Times called Noggin's nighttime promotions "several failed efforts at nocturnal programming." This prompted Noggin's executives to reformat the channel.

By April 1, 2002, Noggin had discarded its retro block and expanded the preschool and tween blocks to 12 hours each. The preschool block, also called "the daytime block," aired from 6 a.m. to 6 p.m. each day. The tween block ran from 6 p.m. to 6 a.m. daily, and it was retitled "The N". It took several months for Noggin to choose the new name for the tween block; as reported by Kidscreen in 2002, they wanted a name to "help distance and distinguish the tween programming from the preschool fare," but the legal department also required that the block's name be related to the name of the channel.

The N, like the rest of the Noggin channel, was launched as a joint venture of Viacom and Sesame Workshop. Noggin unveiled the logo for The N in January 2002. The first logo was a rounded hand symbol with "The N" on the palm and a matching rounded label underneath, reading "NOGGIN". The logo was often simplified without the Noggin label at the bottom; when the channel name was not a part of the logo, taglines were used to describe Noggin as The N's namesake instead. These taglines included "The N: The new name for nighttime on Noggin" and "The N: Noggin's teen network".

=== Developing the block ===
Noggin is The N, The N is Noggin. By day it's for the littlest kids, by night it's for the more mature siblings. "I have a very schizophrenic job," said Sarah Tomassi Lindman, vice president of production and programming for Noggin and The N. "One minute we're looking at potentially a math short [for preschoolers] ... and thinking, 'Are we really communicating effective educational math goals in this?' The next minute we're looking at an episode of Degrassi and deciding how we can most responsibly talk about an issue like date rape or drug use for the older audience."

— The Chicago Tribune, 2004

The N was run by the same team as Noggin's preschool shows, so the block's original shows ended with a card reading "Noggin LLC".

All of The N's web content and shows were owned by Noggin LLC, the same company that owned Noggin's preschool shows. Noggin's preschool and The N blocks were both managed by a group of people in Noggin's New York office. The Noggin team aimed to give The N's shows similar educational sensibilities to their preschool shows; they wanted The N's shows to be sophisticated and complex, to separate them from "lesser network fare" like sitcoms.

The Noggin team considered it a difficult task to focus on both preschoolers and older children at the same time. Sarah Tomassi Lindman, the vice president of Noggin and The N, called her job "very schizophrenic" because the two blocks served such different audiences. Tom Ascheim, the general manager of Noggin and The N, said that "developing a cohesive brand attitude with two different but not altogether dissimilar brands is the challenge facing Noggin / The N."

At launch, The N was aimed at Noggin's original audience of tweens. There are strict broadcast standards for tween programming, so if any "provocative story lines" were deemed unfit for tweens, Noggin had to edit or censor them. However, ratings showed that The N's series were attracting "the broader teenage audience, not just tweens." This made Noggin's executives decide that The N would cater to both tweens and teens. The shift to a wider audience allowed Noggin to relax its standards; in 2005, Degrassi producer Linda Schuyler noted that Noggin did not censor scenes anymore and was "less tentative" than it had been in 2002. The N was commercial-free from April 2002 until May 2004, when Noggin started airing six minutes of commercials per hour during the block.

=== Educational goals ===
Noggin was billed as a "thinking channel"; all of its original shows (including those on The N) were educational. Noggin's crew members felt that tweens and teenagers needed more educational content available for them. Tom Ascheim said, "We saw a void in the marketplace for meaningful, educational programming for tweens," and Sarah Tomassi Lindman felt that preteens and teens were "ignored by both television and on-line groups in an educational capacity." Tom Ascheim named Disney Channel, Nickelodeon, and ABC Family as three networks that targeted tweens but did not offer education for them: "none of those outlets provide real-life, educational-based shows that talk directly to the audience." Noggin wanted The N's programming to fill this role. Noggin tried "to position The N as a place where older kids can go to learn to think." In 2002, when Noggin extended its preschool block and launched The N, Tom Ascheim said that both blocks would remain true to Noggin's educational goals while trying to entertain and engage.

In preparation for launching The N, Noggin held research groups of tweens and teens to determine what kind of educational shows they needed. Noggin found that many older children felt unprepared for their futures and needed help with personal and social development. Tom Ascheim stated, "What (tweens) tell us in research is that their No. 1 challenge outside of class is who they are and where they're going ... we like to be the destination that helps them. It's our educational mission." In a 2004 interview, Ascheim said that The N's shows offered older children "a place they can simulate or sample lives they are not leading ... [and] practice philosophically who they want to become." Similarly, Sarah Tomassi Lindman wanted The N to educate viewers about growing up and discovering their purpose, not just about traditional school subjects.

Noggin hired an educational consultant, Maggie Groening, specifically for The N. Noggin's director of education, Russell Miller, created curricula for the channel's two blocks: the daytime block's curriculum was based on preschool standards, and The N's curriculum was centered on life skills for adolescents. The N ran advertisements that encouraged parents to watch along with their children and hold discussions about topics raised on The N's shows. The N's website offered parent discussion guides for each episode of its shows. Because both of Noggin's blocks focused on education, the book Nickelodeon Nation called Noggin's brand "more unified" than that of Nickelodeon's daytime programming with its nighttime block, Nick at Nite. The book wrote that Noggin "stresses fun, empowering, and educational programming for kids in both age-specific dayparts." The book also wrote that The N block had a "'fun but educational' attitude" that made it stand out from other teen brands.

Noggin had specific educational goals for the original series that it produced for The N. For example, Out There had four objectives that each episode demonstrated: the importance of respecting others, making decisions, effective communication, and building on one's individual strengths. Noggin also acquired shows from outside companies to air during The N, and it selected these shows based on how well they fit the block's educational purpose. Tom Ascheim stated that Degrassi: The Next Generation was acquired because "it follows our educational mission of helping kids figure out their lives and presents a platform from which kids and adults can talk about important social issues." The N's website listed a variety of skills that it aimed to promote, like self-respect, constructive thinking strategies, and tolerance of diversity.

=== Cross-promotions and later history ===
The N's second and final logo, used from October 5, 2007 to September 27, 2009

The book Nickelodeon Nation called The N "an educational twin" to Nickelodeon's SNICK and TEENick. TEENick was a programming block that ran on Nickelodeon from 2001 to early 2009. It and The N were separately controlled brands, each with its own distinct programming. The N was an educational block launched by Viacom and Sesame Workshop, and it featured a mix of series from Noggin, Sesame Workshop, and outside companies; on the other hand, the TEENick block was launched by Viacom alone, featured Nickelodeon sitcoms, and had no educational curriculum. Because the two brands targeted a similar audience, they occasionally cross-promoted their series. In August 2003, three shows from The N were aired as "sneak peeks" on the TEENick block. Multichannel News described this promotion as "'The N' Infiltrates Nick's 'TEENick'." In 2007, premieres of TEENick shows were simulcast on both TEENick and The N. In an interview with The Chicago Tribune, Tom Ascheim said he hoped that Noggin's blocks would reach the same success as Nickelodeon: "I have a huge pride in Nickelodeon ... but like anybody, you look up at sort of your big brother or your more successful cousin or friend and, yeah, you want to kick their butt."

In August 2007, it was announced that The N would move from Noggin to a new, 24-hour channel (replacing game show-focused spinoff Nick GAS) in New Year's Eve. In a press release, Viacom stated that the new channel would "feature 'TEENick' programming during the day and The N's content at night." The new channel space was also called The N, but because TEENick programming took up the daytime hours, it was not a 24-hour version of The N's content. Instead, this format was similar to The N's run on Noggin: The N's content was still relegated to a block at night, with another block during the day. On most cable providers, the new channel was available from December 31, 2007 until September 27, 2009. Dish Network (which GAS closed next month and replaced by West Coast feed of Cartoon Network) did not have the satellite capacity at the time to accommodate the separate channel due to problematic unknown factors). Since The N was still limited to a nighttime block, Dish Network chose to import The N's new block of programming onto Noggin each night from December 31, 2007 until May 6, 2009. This gave Dish subscribers access to The N's primetime programming that otherwise appeared on the separate channel, though not its daytime schedule.

The N's programming was gradually phased out as TEENick series overtook the new channel's schedule. In 2009, the TEENick and The N brands were discontinued and merged to form TeenNick. The N's website was closed as well; writer Jia Tolentino noted that "The N shut down in 2009, taking its website ... bonus clips and fan forums down, too." Some of The N's shows were temporarily shown in reruns, but the rest of the new TeenNick channel borrowed exclusively from TEENick's branding; it was named after the TEENick weekend block, mostly aired TEENick shows, and was hosted by the previous presenter of the TEENick block, Nick Cannon. The TeenNick channel featured no educational programming and had no involvement from the Noggin LLC team that managed The N from 2002 to 2009. All reruns of The N series were removed from TeenNick's schedule by 2015; since then, the channel has transitioned to a schedule of library content. When The N brand was discontinued in 2009, the Noggin / The N office in New York was closed and the team was laid off. During The N's time on a separate channel, it was still managed by the same team at Noggin LLC; there was no change in management until the 2009 closure.

== Programming ==
=== Series ===
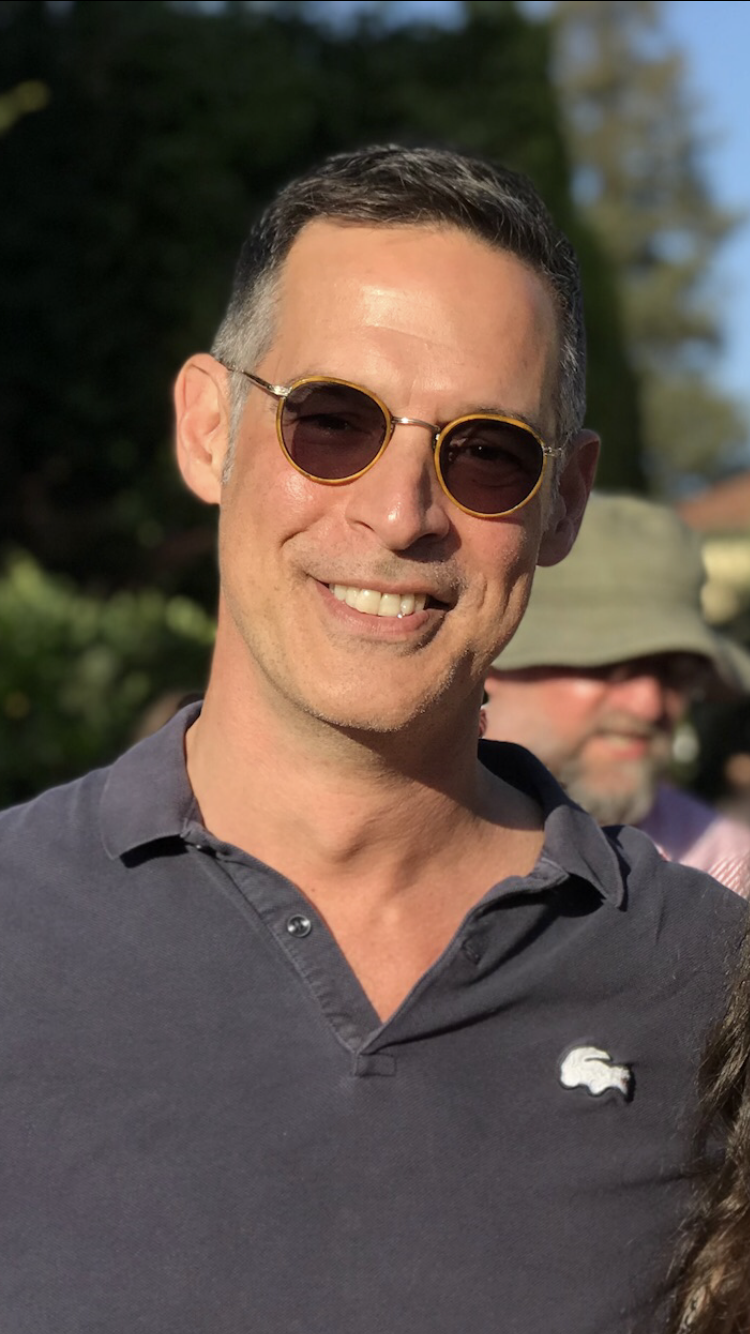
Noggin's manager, Tom Ascheim, controlled both of the channel's blocks. He aimed to make The N's series educational, like the preschool block.

Before The N was introduced, Noggin aired tween-aimed series during the day. After The N began airing, Noggin moved all of its non-preschool shows to the block. Sponk! and Big Kids (co-produced in the UK) were two Noggin-produced series that aired during the daytime in 2001; from 2002 onward, they were shown in reruns during The N block. The N block's schedule also included reruns of shows from Sesame Workshop and Nickelodeon's archives, as well as shows acquired from outside companies, such as Degrassi: The Next Generation (Canada).

Two series that aired new episodes on The N, A Walk in Your Shoes and Out There, were first created for Noggin's original daytime block. A Walk in Your Shoes had been a staple of Noggin's daytime block since 1999 (due to launch), and it was in the middle of its second season when The N was introduced. The rest of the second season and all of the third season aired during The N, along with reruns of older episodes that premiered on Noggin before The N's introduction. Noggin had started filming Out There before it launched The N as a block. When the show started development, it was planned to air during Noggin's daytime block; it instead premiered during The N in 2003.

O'Grady, another original series that aired on The N, also had its roots in Noggin's original daytime block. It was an animated comedy created by Tom Snyder. Noggin first partnered with Snyder in December 1999, when he planned to make an educational children's show for Noggin's daytime block. Noggin released an article about Tom Snyder's project, which said that the show would teach Latin word roots in a comedic way. Snyder's first Noggin series was never completed, but during his partnership with the network, Noggin discovered a series of animations that Snyder had made called O'Grady. Noggin decided to turn O'Grady into a series instead, airing it as part of The N from 2004 to 2006.

Noggin produced a variety of miniseries, reality shows, and specials for The N. In 2003, it aired two miniseries titled LOL with The N and Real Access in The N. It aired two reality shows, Girls v. Boys and Best Friend's Date. In February 2005, it aired a five-part drama titled Miracle's Boys, which was about the real, street lives of African-Americans. In May 2004, it aired a historical documentary titled I Sit Where I Want, focusing on the legacy of Brown v. Board of Education, which ended legal racial segregation in U.S. public schools.

South of Nowhere was one of the last original shows created for The N. It focused on a teenager who moves to Los Angeles and discovers that she is gay. Series creator Thomas Lynch felt that no other brand was "bold and daring enough to air this series." He said that Amy Friedman, the creative director of Noggin and The N, "showed no fear about the idea" of a coming-out storyline; her main focus was on ensuring that the subject matter was treated respectfully. Tom Ascheim said that South of Nowhere represented how he wanted The N to present itself. In an interview with The New York Times, Ascheim said that the show "doesn't preach ... it doesn't pretend it's doing something particularly heroic ... it just kind of says, 'Hi, here we are, being who we are.'" Likewise, Amy Friedman called the show "definitional" to The N.

=== Interstitials ===
Noggin aired commercials to explain the transition between the channel's two blocks.

During The N, Noggin reran older interstitials that had recently aired during the daytime block, such as "Radio Noggin" and "Noggimation". Noggin also created new interstitials for The N, themed around diversity and acceptance. These included "Viva Latinas!" graphics (aimed at Hispanic girls), hip-hop poetry, and shorts in which African-Americans debated the use of racial slurs. In 2006, Noggin created two PSAs for The N: one about gun violence, and another about being an ally to LGBT people.

Noggin also aired a series of station ID shorts that were made for The N. Many of these shorts were designed to look handmade, as if they were designed by real-world tweens and teenagers. The shorts were animated by the Canada-based company Cuppa Coffee Studios, which said "We wanted The N viewers to see the promos and think to themselves, I could do that with my video camera, my computer and a little imagination." The shorts included "Doodles", which was a set of animations based on notebook drawings, and "Action Hand", which starred The N's hand logo and was a parody of action movies.

To announce when The N was starting, Noggin aired a "sign-off" message for the preschool block, which was followed by a timer that counted down to 6 p.m. Eastern Time (ET), when Noggin started airing The N. The preschool block resumed the next day at 6 a.m. ET. Throughout 2002, Noggin ran commercials that explained the two blocks and how the preschool block "transformed" into a tween/teen block at night. These commercials featured the regular Noggin logo becoming pixelated and turning into the logo for The N.

== Spin-off media ==
In 2002, Noggin partnered with the Jillian's restaurant chain to promote its preschool block and The N. The chain sold cards and posters with The N's logo and A Walk in Your Shoes on them. In December 2003, Noggin held a live tour to promote The N's series Real Access in The N in malls across the United States. In August 2006, a soundtrack album for The N's shows was released under the title The N Soundtrack. It was available as a digital download from The N's website on August 22, 2006 and as a retail CD on August 29, 2006.

== Reception ==
In an article for The New York Times, journalist Jon Caramanica commended the block's programming. He wrote, "with its complex characters and genuinely optimistic outlook, The N feels like a private, privileged space where the pesky hierarchies and dogmas of the rest of the world don't apply." Mark McGuire of The Chicago Tribune called The N "frank and compelling entertainment with an educational component that doesn't go down like a compulsory course." In the book Teen Television, Sharon Marie Ross felt that the block stood out from other teen brands due to its commitment to showing diverse perspectives. She wrote that by focusing "on a definition of quality that rested predominantly on social relevancy, diversity, and new media literacy, The N was able to selectively appeal to viewers who may have found The WB too narrow in its vision of the teen experience."

In October 2003, the magazine Broadcasting & Cable reported that Noggin had received a Nielsen rating of 0.3 during The N. More than half of the viewers were in The N's target audience. In 2004, the acquired series Degrassi was the highest-rated show on the block; an episode that aired July 2, 2004, was watched by a record 300,000 people, and Nielsen called it "the No. 1 program for Noggin viewers 12 to 17." Teen viewership of the block grew by 35% from 2004 to 2005.

In July 2003, the Noggin marketing team was awarded at the 20th Annual Mark Awards for their creation of The N's website. In 2004, the team received an advertising award from The One Club for their "Noggin / The N wrapping paper" design, which was used to promote Noggin's two blocks. In 2005, The N's website won a Technology & Engineering Emmy Award for one of its online games, called "The Video Mixer".
