= Sponk! =

Television series

- Genre: Sketch comedy; Improvisational comedy; Game show
- Presented by: Johnathan McClain
- Starring: Allie Berdebes; Tim Dorsch; Julia Kay; Vanessa Lengies; Scott Irby-Ranniar; Miles Thompson; Louie Torrellas; Lori Wells
- Narrated by: Karen Fowler (as SID)
- Theme music composer: Chris Phillips
- Countries of origin: United States; Canada
- Original language: English
- No. of seasons: 1
- No. of episodes: 26

Production
- Executive producer: Eileen Braun
- Producer: Karen Fowler
- Running time: 30 minutes
- Production companies: Sesame Workshop; Insight Productions

Original release
- Network: Noggin
- Release: September 10, 2001 – March 4, 2002

Sponk! is a children's television game show produced by Sesame Workshop and Insight Productions for the Noggin channel. It was Sesame Workshop's first original production for Noggin. It premiered on Noggin on September 10, 2001 and ended on March 4, 2002. The series reran on Nickelodeon on Sunday mornings, starting September 16.

The premise of Sponk! was improvisational comedy, similar to the show Whose Line Is It Anyway? Two teams of performers depicted suggestions in a variety of games. Viewers suggested their ideas by submitting them to the Noggin website. "SID" (Suggestion & Idea Distributor) was the name of the computer on the show that picked the ideas submitted by Noggin.com members. From 2002 to 2004, Noggin aired reruns of Sponk! as part of its nighttime programming block, The N.

== Cast ==
The cast included host Johnathan McClain, and announcer (as the voice of SID) Karen Fowler. The performers were all young actors. Among them were Julia Kay, Tim Dorsch, Scott Irby-Ranniar, Lori Wells, Miles Thompson (who later went on to star in the feature film Me and You and Everyone We Know and cameoed in Return to Sleepaway Camp), Allie Berdebes, Vanessa Lengies, and Louie Torrellas.

== Gameplay ==
The game show featured young actors and a young studio audience. The performers were four boys and four girls, but with two sitting out and six competing in a red team and blue team. The ideas for the improvisational and sketch contests were submitted by the home audience through Noggin.com. SID would then pick a submission and provide credit for the home audience (as their screen name). Later, she announced the winner of a small electronic device.

The studio audience participated as judges for the sketches. They disqualified a contestant by yelling out, "Sponk!". When time ran out and the sound of a hen squawking was played, the audience voted the winner by raising the side of their "Spaddle" to vote for the red team or blue team. The "prize" that the performers competed for was the Sponk Trophy, a golden rubber chicken. Occasionally an audience member would be the sketch participant while the original performers acted as a celebrity panel and won a small prize for participating.
