= Noggin (brand) =

American entertainment brand

- Logo used since August 21, 2025
- Product type: Television channel (1999–2009); Website (1999–2009, 2015–present); Streaming service (2015–24, 2025–present)
- Current owner: Noggin Holdings, Inc.
- Country: United States
- Introduced: February 2, 1999; 27 years ago (television channel); March 5, 2015; 11 years ago (streaming service, original); August 21, 2025; 14 months ago (streaming service, revival)
- Discontinued: September 28, 2009; 17 years ago (television channel); July 2, 2024; 2 years ago (streaming service, original)
- Markets: United States; United Kingdom (2004–05, 2006–10, 2020–24); Latin America (2015–24); France, Germany, and Austria (2020–24)
- Previous owners: Sesame Workshop (co-owner; 1999–2002); Paramount Media Networks (Note: Paramount Media Networks was previously known as MTV Networks (1984–2011), Viacom Media Networks (2011–2019), and ViacomCBS Domestic Media Networks (2019–2022).) (1999–2024)
- Website: noggin.com

Noggin is an American entertainment brand launched on February 2, 1999. Currently a streaming service, Noggin features educational series and games for children ages 5 to 12. Originally co-founded by Paramount and Sesame Workshop, Sesame left the company in 2002. Paramount retained ownership until 2024, when it sold the brand to Noggin's former CEO, Kristen Kane.

From 1999 until 2009, Noggin was a cable television channel. The channel featured a daytime programming block for preschoolers and an overnight block for teenagers called "The N." From 2015 to 2024, Noggin was a streaming service, featuring both classic Noggin series and new original series. In August 2025, Noggin was relaunched as a new streaming app. The new 2025 app features an entirely original library instead of legacy programming from the brand's previous iterations.

Noggin has received positive critical reception throughout its history, primarily for its older-targeted series. In 2003, Noggin received a Peabody Award for its series A Walk in Your Shoes. From 2004 to 2008, Noggin won three Webby Awards for its website. Noggin received a Writers' Guild of America Award and three GLAAD Media Award nominations for Miracle's Boys and South of Nowhere, both made for its teen-aimed programming block, The N.

== Creation ==
The framework for Noggin was established in 1995, when Sesame Workshop (then known as the Children's Television Workshop) planned to start an educational cable channel, dubbed "New Kid City." The Los Angeles Times reported that creating its own channel was "the only way to ensure a home for its highly acclaimed shows," since other cable networks had replaced Sesame Workshop's educational programming with commercialized, merchandise-driven series. Meanwhile, Nickelodeon (part of MTV Networks) planned its own educational channel called "Big Orange." When the two companies learned of each other's ideas, they partnered to create a channel together.

The channel was named Noggin, a slang term for a person's head. The name reflected the channel's purpose: to encourage children to think, discover new things, and use their imaginations. When it started, Noggin was mostly aimed at a pre-teen audience. Its main goal was to provide "fun shows that help kids learn and inspire their curiosity – all without feeling like they're in school." Noggin's core values included the statements: "Kids want to learn. Kids are naturally curious. There are no stupid questions."

== Brand elements ==
=== Logo and branding ===
The original Noggin logo used from 1999 to 2009, 2015 to 2019, and used on Noggin.com from 2024 to 2025

Noggin's first logo was the bottom half of a smiling cartoon face. The logo's upper half featured different icons that represented topics the head was "thinking of" (such as a beaker to reflect science, or flowers to reflect springtime). Hundreds of different "toppers" were designed for the logo. For its first few years, Noggin often captioned its logo with the slogan "What sparks you?" It also aired videos of children and teens responding to the question, explaining their favorite topics that "spark" their imaginations.

Noggin's logo was featured in many original animations that ran between shows on the channel. In its early years, Noggin's creative team hired "sick and twisted" independent animators to create commercials for them, hoping that they could each bring their own personal design elements to the logo. The goal was to make the logo "look unlike any other network" and inspire viewers' creativity. In 2019, the original Noggin face logo was retired and replaced with a lowercase noggin wordmark written in purple. In August 2025, a third logo was introduced: a pink-colored wordmark with "NOGGIN" written in curved letters, resembling the shape of a brain.

=== Television channel ===
The first service established under Noggin was a cable television channel. It operated from February 2, 1999, until September 28, 2009. Noggin was originally aimed at pre-teens, since Noggin's creative team felt that this age group was "underserved when it comes to new, quality educational television." One of Noggin's goals was to disprove the idea "that educational programming is not entertaining enough to attract pre-teens and young adults." The Noggin channel was commercial-free and allowed teachers to tape its programs for use in their classrooms.

Noggin's original lineup included classic episodes of The Electric Company, 3-2-1 Contact, Cro, Square One Television, and Ghostwriter from Sesame Workshop's library. It also included series such as Wild Side Show, Nick News and Doug from Paramount's library. From 2000 to 2002, Noggin aired reruns of the PBS science program Bill Nye the Science Guy. Bill Nye also starred in brand-new segments made specially for Noggin, where he played the role of Noggin's "head sparkologist" and tried to find out what topics sparked viewers' imaginations.

Noggin's first original program was Phred on Your Head Show, which featured an animated host named Phred. A second original series, A Walk in Your Shoes, premiered in October 1999. Each episode of A Walk in Your Shoes followed two different people "switching lives" to better understand each other's cultures. In 2000, Noggin introduced three series of shorts that aired during program breaks: Me in a Box, which featured children making dioramas to represent their personalities; Citizen Phoebe, about a girl who wants to run for president; and Oobi, a preschool series featuring bare-handed puppets.

By 2001, original content made up 40% of Noggin's schedule. That year, Noggin premiered four new shows: Big Kids, a British-US co-production; On the Team, a documentary about a Little League baseball team; Sponk!, a game show centered around improv acting; and The URL with Phred Show, which showcased viewers' submissions to the Noggin website. On April 1, 2002, the channel was reorganized into two blocks each lasting 12 hours: a daytime block for preschoolers and a nighttime block, The N, for teens. Play with Me Sesame, a new series featuring Sesame Street characters, premiered on the same day.

Sesame Workshop continued to co-produce shows for Noggin until 2009, most notably Out There and The Upside Down Show, two live-action series. Both shows were developed by Sesame Workshop's writers in New York and filmed by a multinational team in Australia. On December 31, 2007 (Spring 2009 on Dish due to problematic unknown factors), Noggin became fully devoted to preschoolers, with The N moving to the channel space formerly held by Nick GAS.

On September 28, 2009, as part of Nickelodeon's massive rebranding, the Noggin channel closed, and its channel space was replaced by a 24-hour channel based on Nickelodeon's Nick Jr. block (whose programming had been gradually overtaking Noggin's lineup since 2003). However, the new channel retained Noggin's on-air branding style until March 1, 2012. The Noggin brand was placed on a six-year hiatus until 2015.

=== The N ===
A promo for The N as a block on Noggin

The N (standing for Noggin) was an overnight programming block on the Noggin channel, aimed at older children and teenagers. It aired from April 1, 2002, until December 31, 2007 (Spring 2009 on Dish). It took several months for Noggin to choose the right name for the block; as reported by Kidscreen in 2002, they needed a name to "help distance and distinguish the tween programming from the preschool fare", but the legal department also required the block to maintain a relation to Noggin's main name.

Noggin's preexisting tween-targeted shows—like A Walk in Your Shoes and Sponk!—only aired during The N from 2002 onward. Noggin produced several original series for the block, including the animated comedy O'Grady, the drama South of Nowhere, and the competition show Girls v. Boys. The N was also the U.S. broadcast home of the Canadian series Degrassi: The Next Generation. Noggin aimed to promote a variety of life skills through the shows on The N, including self-respect, constructive thinking, and tolerance of diversity.

The second logo for The N, introduced on October 5, 2007, but used for a short time as a block.

Like the rest of Noggin, The N's shows were created with educational goals, which was uncommon for teen programming. The block was managed by the same team that made Noggin's preschool shows. The team considered it a challenge to focus on both preschoolers and an older audience, but because both focused on educational shows with valuable life lessons, they felt Noggin and The N had a "unified brand identity." From 2007 to 2009, the block was moved from Noggin to a new channel, which carried TEENick programming throughout the day and relegated The N's content to a block at night. According to Polygon, "Nickelodeon began phasing out The N's programming and replacing it with TEENick, an entertainment block with no educational curriculum and zero involvement from Noggin. The N lost its footing by 2009, and both [The N] and its website closed down completely."

=== Streaming service (original) ===
Noggin's second logo, used from June 14, 2019, to July 2, 2024

On March 5, 2015, Noggin relaunched as a streaming service. It included older shows from Noggin's time as a cable channel. In 2020, Noggin premiered new shows available exclusively on the service. These included an exercise show called Yoga Friends and a cooking show called School of Yum. Kinderwood, an animated series about five classmates at a magical school, premiered on Noggin in 2020. In 2021, the service introduced a half-hour educational show called Noggin Knows and a series of shorts called The Noggins, which featured new teal-colored mascots called Noggins. In 2023, it premiered a dance show called Dance Squad with Ailey and a nature show called Troop Dragonfly.

The Noggin streaming service also launched internationally. Spanish and Portuguese versions were released in Latin America in November 2015. On September 21, 2020, it was announced that the Noggin service would launch in four European countries (United Kingdom, France, Germany and Austria) as an add-on to Amazon Prime Video and Apple TV.

On February 13, 2024, when Paramount Global CEO Bob Bakish announced that the company would be laying off 800 workers, unconfirmed reports began surfacing on social media that Noggin would shut down due to layoffs. Two days later, Kidscreen reported that the entire Noggin team was laid off and the Noggin service would be shutting down in the coming months; they also announced that Noggin stopped accepting new subscribers, with a transition period for current subscribers. On May 3, an email notified customers that the Noggin service would shut down on July 2, 2024, and customers who were still subscribed to Noggin would no longer be billed after May 30. The service was shut down on July 2, 2024.

=== Streaming service (revival) ===
On August 21, 2025, it was announced that Noggin would relaunch as a new streaming service for an older audience of pre-teens. A Kidscreen article confirmed that Paramount Global sold Noggin to Kristen Kane, who previously ran Noggin as its CEO from 2019 to 2024. Following the sale, Noggin is now fully independent.

The relaunched Noggin features a virtual game world, "Nogginville," which was carried over from the previous Noggin app. The game was updated to replace the previous preschool-aged player avatars with teenage avatars.

=== Mascots ===
Throughout its history, Noggin has featured unique animated characters who acted as the hosts and mascots of the brand. During Noggin's time as a cable channel, these mascots often appeared during program breaks to introduce shows. Noggin has had the following mascots:

- Phred (1999–2002) – A small, yellow-green creature (voiced by Doug Preis) who was Noggin's first mascot. He talked in a New York accent and liked to make jokes. He interacted with live-action guests by hopping on top of their heads and talking to them.
- Clyde (2000–2002) – A living crown who tours on Noggin's Comic Machine, where fans make their own comics online.
- An unnamed blue mascot (2002–2003) – This character (voiced by Jessica DiCicco), shaped like a circular face with legs, hosted Noggin's preschool block from April 1, 2002 to April 6, 2003. She is unofficially nicknamed "Feetface" by fans.
- Moose and Zee (2003–2009; 2015–2024) – A talking yellow moose (voiced by Paul Christie) and a silent blue bird, who debuted on April 7, 2003. A video collection of their appearances was released to the Noggin streaming service in 2015, packaged as its own series. Moose and Zee continued to have their own page on the service until its closure in 2024.
- The Alpha Teens (2004–2005; The N) – The N's mascots. A group of high schoolers drawn in a comic book style. They first appeared on The N block in 2004. They introduced the shows on The N's schedule.
- The Noggins (2021–2024) – A group of short, teal-colored creatures with purple eyes, who appeared as mascots on the Noggin streaming service from 2021 until 2024. During the Noggins' tenure as hosts, Moose and Zee continued to have their own page on the app.

== Spin-off media ==
=== Websites ===
The Noggin channel launched along with an interactive website, Noggin.com. It was first active from 1999 to 2009 and returned in 2015. The site featured games, blogs, printables, and fact sheets. The website was integrated into some of Noggin's earlier shows, like Sponk! and The URL with Phred Show, which featured viewer-submitted questions and artwork from Noggin.com. Throughout 2000, Bill Nye of Bill Nye the Science Guy answered questions asked by Noggin.com users between airings of his show. In 2001, Noggin launched "Chattervision", which allowed viewers to comment on different shows online and see their comments live on TV.

One of the website's first games was the "Noggimation Station", which taught visitors about the animation process and allowed them to design their own animations, some of which were chosen to air on TV. Another website, called MyNoggin.com, was launched in October 2007. It was a subscription-based site that offered educational games and allowed parents to track their child's progress in different subjects.

On September 4, 2024, the Noggin website, trademarks and content library were purchased from Paramount Global by Noggin's former CEO, Kristen Kane, through a separate company named Noggin Holdings, Inc. On October 3, Noggin's website was updated, featuring a green version of Noggin's 1999 logo over the message "Rebooting..." on a black background. On February 24, 2025, the website added a waitlist form where the user could sign up to "be the first to know when Noggin is back." In August 2025, the website became a guide to the relaunched Noggin app.

In October 2025, the relaunched company acquired Hello Wonder, an AI company.

=== Blocks on other channels ===
Blocks based on Noggin have aired on other channels. TV Land aired a one-night Noggin special on April 26, 1999. Spanning two hours, the special featured reruns of The Electric Company, along with animated shorts featuring the Noggin logo. Noggin shows were also occasionally seen on the main Nickelodeon channel. On June 6, 1999, Nickelodeon ran the first episode of Noggin's Phred on Your Head Show.

On March 27, 2000, Nickelodeon introduced a half-hour block of Noggin shows that aired every weekday morning until June 2001. The block was originally titled "Noggins Up" and became "Noggin on Nickelodeon" during its second year on the air. It showcased one preteen-aimed program every weekday, including A Walk In Your Shoes and On the Team. The block attracted thousands of visitors to the Noggin.com site. Nickelodeon revived the block for a single day on April 7, 2003. Following the block's removal, premiere episodes of Noggin series were often simulcast on Nickelodeon and Noggin.

The Noggin name was used for an otherwise unrelated programming block on Nick Jr. UK from May 2004 until September 2005. It ran for two hours every night and included reruns of older British television series for children. On January 30, 2006, Noggin was launched as a block on TMF in the United Kingdom, this time in the manner of the US Noggin. It ran every weekday from 7 a.m. to 9 a.m. Noggin continued for a short time on TMF's successor, VIVA, until March 2010.

From May 2021 to March 2022, the Nick Jr. Channel aired an hour-long block of programming from the Noggin streaming service every Friday. The block, titled "Noggin Hour", featured shows such as Noggin Knows and Kinderwood, as well as the acquired series Hey Duggee and JoJo & Gran Gran. Since July 30, 2021, Noggin interstitials played during commercial breaks, and a purple screen bug reading "On Noggin" was shown toward the beginning of each program.

==== TV distribution ====
Name	Active date	Country	Partnership(s)
Noggin	February 2, 1999 – July 30, 2021	United States	Independent (February 2, 1999 – September 28, 2009); TV Land (April 26, 1999 – December 1999); Nickelodeon (March 27, 2000 – February 7, 2007); Nick Jr. Channel (May 28 – July 30, 2021)
Noggin/Noggin on TMF/Viva	May 31, 2004 – March 2010	United Kingdom	Nick Jr. (May 31, 2004 – September 5, 2005); TMF (January 30, 2006 – October 26, 2009); Viva (October 26, 2009 – March 2010)

=== Live events ===
Noggin held live events to promote its shows. At the 2001 North American Trade Show in Minnesota, Noggin presented a replica of the set from Oobi. In spring 2002, Noggin launched a live version of its Play with Me Sesame series, featuring mascot characters and music from the show. In May 2002, the Jillian's restaurant chain offered "Noggin Play Days" each Wednesday afternoon, where attendees could watch a live feed of Noggin with themed activities and meals.

In March 2004, Noggin partnered with GGP shopping malls to host a free arts-and-crafts program called Club Noggin. It debuted at five malls in April of the same year. Attendance at the first few events exceeded expectations, leading GGP to bring Club Noggin to over 100 malls across the United States. The monthly events were hosted by trained YMCA leaders, who offered crafts and activities based on Noggin characters. Each meeting was themed around a different Noggin show.

From October 2005 until late 2006, Noggin sponsored a music festival called "Jamarama Live", which toured the United States. The tour had performances from Laurie Berkner, a musician on Jack's Big Music Show. It also had appearances from a mascot costume of Moose A. Moose. Reviewers for Time Magazine compared Jamarama to a family-friendly version of Lollapalooza.

In November 2005, a Noggin float appeared at America's Thanksgiving Parade. In November 2006, Noggin hosted an online charity auction on its website, called the "Noggin Auction". Viewers could bid on props from different Noggin shows. Noggin also auctioned off props from The N's teen-aimed shows, with the money going to homeless shelters. In August 2007, Noggin partnered with St. Jude Children's Research Hospital and sponsored its annual Trike-A-Thon program.

== Reception ==
Noggin has received positive critical reception, as well as several awards and nominations for its series, branding, and website. Noggin received three Webby Awards for its website: one in 2004 in the Broadband category, a second in 2005 in the Youth category, and a third in 2008. Time Magazine also included the Noggin site on its "50 Best Websites of 2004" list. Noggin received a Parents' Choice Award in 2008.

In 2003, Noggin's documentary series A Walk in Your Shoes received a Peabody Award. In 2006, Noggin won a Writers' Guild of America Award for its miniseries Miracle's Boys. Noggin received three GLAAD Media Award for Outstanding Drama Series for South of Nowhere: in 2006, 2007, and 2009. In 2007, Noggin received three awards for The Upside Down Show: a Creative Craft Daytime Emmy Award, a Parents' Choice Award Silver Honor for Television, and a Logie Award in the category Most Outstanding Children's Program.
