= Bust a Move =

Bust a Move may refer to:

== In music ==
- "Bust a Move" (song), a 1989 hip hop song by Young MC

== In video games ==
- Bust-a-Move, a 1994 puzzle video game known as Puzzle Bobble outside of North America and Europe
- Bust a Move: Dance & Rhythm Action, original Japanese name for Bust a Groove

== In television ==
- "Bust A Move Part 1", an episode of Degrassi: The Next Generation
- "Bust A Move Part 2", an episode of Degrassi: The Next Generation
