= List of Degrassi: The Next Generation episodes =

Degrassi: The Next Generation (known simply as Degrassi for its final five seasons) is a Canadian teen drama television series created by Linda Schuyler and Yan Moore. The series first premiered on CTV on October 14, 2001, and concluded on MTV Canada on August 2, 2015. It is the fourth series set in the fictional Degrassi universe created by Schuyler and Kit Hood in 1979. Like its predecessors, Degrassi: The Next Generation follows a group of students from Degrassi Community School, a fictional school in Toronto, Ontario, and depicts some of the typical and atypical issues and challenges common to teenagers' lives.

The series produced 366 individual episodes; however, because of differing individual episode lengths, and all syndicated episodes being half-an-hour long, 385 produced episodes have aired.

The first twelve seasons of Degrassi: The Next Generation are available on DVD in Region 1, with season one through four also available in Region 4. Episodes are also available digitally: MTV Canada and TeenNick stream episodes on their websites; registered users of the Canadian and American iTunes Stores are able to purchase and download episodes for playback on home computers and certain iPods; episodes were also available for download from Puretracks in Canada. All episodes are available to stream on YouTube in countries outside the United States and Canada. The episodes are in a Windows Media 10 file and the purchaser owns them forever, although the episodes can only be burned onto a disc three times and copied to a device three times. Additionally, every episode was available on the Xbox Live Marketplace in the United States.

In addition to the regular episodes, nine "special episodes" have been produced, which are not part of the Degrassi continuity. They consist of two Halloween-themed episodes and six documentaries following the work of the show's cast in other countries.

A number of episodes have aired out of production order in either Canada or the United States. This is a list of Degrassi: The Next Generation episodes by order of production, as they appear on the DVDs. There are also several shorter episodes available on the official Degrassi YouTube channel, known as "Degrassi Minis".

== Series overview ==
| Season | Episodes | | Originally released | | |
| Season | Episodes | | First released | Last released | Network |
|---|---|---|---|---|---|
| 1 | 15 | | October 14, 2001 | March 3, 2002 | CTV |
| 2 | 22 | | September 29, 2002 | February 23, 2003 | CTV |
| 3 | 22 | | September 17, 2003 | April 5, 2004 | CTV |
| 4 | 22 | | September 7, 2004 | February 14, 2005 | CTV |
| 5 | 19 | | September 19, 2005 | March 20, 2006 | CTV |
| 6 | 19 | | September 29, 2006 | May 14, 2007 | CTV |
| 7 | 24 | | October 5, 2007 | June 23, 2008 | CTV |
| 8 | 22 | | October 5, 2008 | August 14, 2009 | CTV |
| 9 | 23 | 14 | October 4, 2009 | November 22, 2009 | CTV |
| 9 | 23 | 9 | May 10, 2010 | July 16, 2010 | MuchMusic |
| 10 | 44 | | July 19, 2010 | April 22, 2011 | MuchMusic |
| 11 | 45 | | July 18, 2011 | May 18, 2012 | MuchMusic |
| 12 | 40 | | July 16, 2012 | June 21, 2013 | MuchMusic |
| 13 | 40 | 8 | July 11, 2013 | August 22, 2013 | MuchMusic |
| 13 | 40 | 32 | October 2, 2013 | July 29, 2014 | MTV Canada |
| 14 | 28 | | October 28, 2014 | August 2, 2015 | MTV Canada |

== Episodes ==
=== Season 1 (2001–02) ===
| No. overall | No. in season | Title | Original release date | Prod. code |
|---|---|---|---|---|
| 1 2 | 1 2 | "Mother and Child Reunion" | October 14, 2001 | 101 & 102 |
| 3 | 3 | "Family Politics" | November 4, 2001 | 103 |
| 4 | 4 | "Eye of the Beholder" | November 11, 2001 | 104 |
| 5 | 5 | "Parents' Day" | November 18, 2001 | 105 |
| 6 | 6 | "The Mating Game" | November 25, 2001 | 106 |
| 7 | 7 | "Basketball Diaries" | December 2, 2001 | 107 |
| 8 | 8 | "Secrets & Lies" | December 9, 2001 | 108 |
| 9 | 9 | "Coming of Age" | December 16, 2001 | 109 |
| 10 | 10 | "Rumours and Reputations" | January 6, 2002 | 110 |
| 11 | 11 | "Friday Night" | January 27, 2002 | 111 |
| 12 | 12 | "Wannabe" | February 3, 2002 | 112 |
| 13 | 13 | "Cabaret" | February 17, 2002 | 113 |
| 14 | 14 | "Under Pressure" | February 24, 2002 | 114 |
| 15 | 15 | "Jagged Little Pill" | March 3, 2002 | 115 |

=== Season 2 (2002–03) ===
| No. overall | No. in season | Title | Directed by | Written by | Canada airdate | U.S. airdate | Prod. code |
|---|---|---|---|---|---|---|---|
| 16–17 | 1–2 | "When Doves Cry" | Bruce McDonald | Yan Moore & Aaron Martin | September 29, 2002 | October 7, 2002 (The N) | 201/202 |
| 18 | 3 | "Girls Just Wanna Have Fun" | Phil Earnshaw | Story by : Yan Moore & Shelley Scarrow; Teleplay by : Susin Nielsen | October 6, 2002 | October 14, 2002 (The N) | 203 |
| 19 | 4 | "Karma Chameleon" | Stefan Scaini | Story by : Aaron Martin & Shelley Scarrow; Teleplay by : Claire Ross Dunn | October 13, 2002 | October 21, 2002 (The N) | 204 |
| 20 | 5 | "Weird Science" | Bruce McDonald | Story by : James Hurst & Shelley Scarrow; Teleplay by : James Hurst | October 20, 2002 | November 11, 2002 (The N) | 205 |
| 21 | 6 | "Drive" | Stefan Scaini | Story by : Aaron Martin & Jana Sinyor; Teleplay by : James Hurst | October 27, 2002 | November 25, 2002 (The N) | 206 |
| 22 | 7 | "Shout: Part 1" | Phil Earnshaw | Story by : Aaron Martin & Claire Ross Dunn; Teleplay by : Tassie Cameron | November 3, 2002 | July 11, 2003 (The N) | 207 |
| 23 | 8 | "Shout: Part 2" | Phil Earnshaw | Story by : Aaron Martin & Craig Cornell; Teleplay by : Tassie Cameron | November 10, 2002 | July 11, 2003 (The N) | 208 |
| 24 | 9 | "Mirror in the Bathroom" | Paul Fox | Story by : James Hurst & Claire Ross Dunn; Teleplay by : Brendon Yorke | November 17, 2002 | July 18, 2003 (The N) | 209 |
| 25 | 10 | "Take My Breath Away" | Stefan Scaini | Story by : Aaron Martin & Yan Moore; Teleplay by : James Hurst | November 24, 2002 | December 9, 2002 (The N) | 210 |
| 26 | 11 | "Don't Believe the Hype" | Anais Granofsky | Story by : David Sutherland & James Hurst; Teleplay by : David Sutherland | December 1, 2002 | December 23, 2002 (The N) | 211 |
| 27–28 | 12–13 | "White Wedding" | Bruce McDonald | Story by : Aaron Martin & Tassie Cameron; Teleplay by : Aaron Martin | January 5, 2003 | January 6, 2003 (The N) | 212/213 |
| 29 | 14 | "Careless Whisper" | Laurie Lynd | Story by : Aaron Martin & Craig Cornell; Teleplay by : Aaron Martin | January 3, 2003 | January 13, 2003 (The N) | 214 |
| 30 | 15 | "Hot for Teacher" | Phil Earnshaw | Story by : Jana Sinyor & Claire Ross Dunn; Teleplay by : Sean Jara | January 10, 2003 | July 25, 2003 (The N) | 215 |
| 31 | 16 | "Message in a Bottle" | Bruce McDonald | Story by : Aaron Martin & Sean Jara; Teleplay by : James Hurst | January 17, 2003 | August 1, 2003 (The N) | 216 |
| 32 | 17 | "Relax" | Laurie Lynd | Story by : Shelley Scarrow & Sean Jara; Teleplay by : Craig Cornell | January 26, 2003 | August 8, 2003 (The N) | 217 |
| 33 | 18 | "Dressed in Black" | Gavin Smith | Story by : Sean Jara & Aaron Martin; Teleplay by : Jana Sinyor | January 19, 2003 | August 15,2003 (The N) | 218 |
| 34 | 19 | "Fight for Your Right" | Chris Deacon | Story by : Aaron Martin & Sean Jara; Teleplay by : Susin Nielsen | February 2, 2003 | August 22, 2003 (The N) | 219 |
| 35 | 20 | "How Soon is Now?" | Eleanore Lindo | Story by : Craig Cornell & James Hurst; Teleplay by : Shelley Scarrow | February 9, 2003 | July 11, 2003 (The N) | 220 |
| 36 | 21 | "Tears Are Not Enough: Part One" | Phil Earnshaw | Story by : Aaron Martin & James Hurst; Teleplay by : Aaron Martin | February 16, 2003 | August 29, 2003 (The N) | 221 |
| 37 | 22 | "Tears Are Not Enough: Part Two" | Phil Earnshaw | Story by : Aaron Martin & James Hurst; Teleplay by : Aaron Martin | February 23, 2003 | August 29, 2003 (The N) | 222 |

=== Season 3 (2003–04) ===
| No. overall | No. in season | Title | Directed by | Written by | Canada airdate | U.S. airdate | Prod. code |
|---|---|---|---|---|---|---|---|
| 38–39 | 1–2 | "Father Figure" | Bruce McDonald | Story by : Aaron Martin & Yan Moore; Teleplay by : James Hurst | September 17, 2003 | October 3, 2003 (The N) | 301 & 302 |
| 40 | 3 | "U Got the Look" | Stefan Scaini | Story by : Jana Sinyor & Brendon Yorke; Teleplay by : Jana Sinyor | October 1, 2003 | October 10, 2003 (The N) | 303 |
| 41 | 4 | "Pride: Part 1" | Phil Earnshaw | Story by : Aaron Martin & James Hurst & Shelley Scarrow; Teleplay by : Aaron Martin | October 8, 2003 | October 17, 2003 (The N) | 304 |
| 42 | 5 | "Pride: Part 2" | Phil Earnshaw | Story by : Aaron Martin & James Hurst & Shelley Scarrow; Teleplay by : Aaron Martin | October 15, 2003 | October 17, 2003 (The N) | 305 |
| 43 | 6 | "Gangsta Gangsta" | Allan Eastman | Story by : Sean Jara & Rebecca Schechter; Teleplay by : Sean Jara | October 22, 2003 | October 24, 2003 (The N) | 306 |
| 44 | 7 | "Should I Stay or Should I Go?" | Stefan Scaini | Story by : Aaron Martin & Shelley Scarrow; Teleplay by : Shelley Scarrow | October 29, 2003 | October 31, 2003 (The N) | 307 |
| 45 | 8 | "Whisper to a Scream" | Phil Earnshaw | Story by : James Hurst & Rebecca Schechter; Teleplay by : Tassie Cameron | November 5, 2003 | November 28, 2003 (The N) | 308 |
| 46 | 9 | "Against All Odds" | Stefan Scaini | Story by : Aaron Martin & Craig Cornell; Teleplay by : James Hurst | November 12, 2003 | December 5, 2003 (The N) | 309 |
| 47 | 10 | "Never Gonna Give You Up" | John Bell | Story by : Yan Moore & Craig Cornell; Teleplay by : James Hurst | November 19, 2003 | December 12, 2003 (The N) | 310 |
| 48–49 | 11–12 | "Holiday" | Phil Earnshaw | Story by : James Hurst & Shelley Scarrow; Teleplay by : Aaron Martin | December 17, 2003 | December 19, 2003 (The N) | 311/312 |
| 50 | 13 | "This Charming Man" | Stefan Scaini | Story by : Aaron Martin & Nicole Demerse; Teleplay by : Jana Sinyor | December 10, 2003 | June 4, 2004 (The N) | 313 |
| 51 | 14 | "Accidents Will Happen" Part One | Eleanore Lindo | Story by : James Hurst & Nicole Demerse; Teleplay by : Shelley Scarrow | January 26, 2004 | August 26, 2006 (The N) | 314 |
| 52 | 15 | "Accidents Will Happen" Part Two | Eleanore Lindo | Story by : James Hurst & Nicole Demerse; Teleplay by : Shelley Scarrow | February 9, 2004 | August 26, 2006 (The N) | 315 |
| 53 | 16 | "Take on Me" | Phil Earnshaw | Story by : Sean Carley & Aaron Martin; Teleplay by : Sean Carley | February 16, 2004 | June 11, 2004 (The N) | 316 |
| 54 | 17 | "Don't Dream It's Over" | Allan Eastman | Story by : Aaron Martin & Christine Alexiou; Teleplay by : Rebecca Schechter | February 23, 2004 | June 18, 2004 (The N) | 317 |
| 55 | 18 | "Rock & Roll High School" | Stefan Scaini | Story by : James Hurst & Rebecca Schechter; Teleplay by : Brendon Yorke | March 8, 2004 | July 2, 2004 (The N) | 318 |
| 56 | 19 | "It's Raining Men" | Andrew Potter | Story by : James Hurst & Aaron Martin; Teleplay by : James Hurst | March 15, 2004 | July 9, 2004 (The N) | 319 |
| 57 | 20 | "I Want Candy" | Stefan Scaini | Story by : Aaron Martin & Shelley Scarrow; Teleplay by : Aaron Martin | March 22, 2004 | July 16, 2004 (The N) | 320 |
| 58 | 21 | "Our House" | Allan Eastman | Story by : Yan Moore & Aaron Martin; Teleplay by : Yan Moore | March 29, 2004 | July 30, 2004 (The N) | 321 |
| 59 | 22 | "The Power of Love" | Stefan Scaini | Story by : Aaron Martin & Shelley Scarrow; Teleplay by : Aaron Martin | April 5, 2004 | August 6, 2004 (The N) | 322 |

=== Season 4 (2004–05) ===
| No. overall | No. in season | Title | Directed by | Written by | Canada airdate | U.S. airdate | Prod. code |
|---|---|---|---|---|---|---|---|
| 60–61 | 1–2 | "Ghost in the Machine" | Phil Earnshaw | Story by : Shelley Scarrow & James Hurst; Teleplay by : Shelley Scarrow | September 7, 2004 | October 1, 2004 | 401/402 |
| 62 | 3 | "King of Pain" | Stefan Scaini | Story by : Sean Reycraft & Shelley Scarrow; Teleplay by : Sean Reycraft | September 21, 2004 | October 8, 2004 | 403 |
| 63 | 4 | "Mercy Street" | Stefan Scaini | Story by : James Hurst & Miklos Perlus; Teleplay by : James Hurst | September 21, 2004 | October 15, 2004 | 404 |
| 64 | 5 | "Anywhere I Lay My Head" | Phil Earnshaw | Story by : Richard Clark & Shelley Scarrow; Teleplay by : Richard Clark | September 28, 2004 | October 22, 2004 | 405 |
| 65 | 6 | "Islands in the Stream" | Phil Earnshaw | Story by : Sean Reycraft & Aaron Martin; Teleplay by : Sean Reycraft | September 28, 2004 | November 26, 2004 | 406 |
| 66 | 7 | "Time Stands Still" Part One | Stefan Scaini | Story by : Brendon Yorke & Aaron Martin; Teleplay by : Brendon Yorke | October 5, 2004 | December 3, 2004 | 407 |
| 67 | 8 | "Time Stands Still" Part Two | Stefan Scaini | Story by : Brendon Yorke & Aaron Martin; Teleplay by : Brendon Yorke | October 12, 2004 | December 10, 2004 | 408 |
| 68 | 9 | "Back in Black" | Ron Murphy | Aaron Martin & Miklos Perlus | October 19, 2004 | December 17, 2004 | 409 |
| 69 | 10 | "Neutron Dance" | Ron Murphy | Story by : Sean Carley & Miklos Perlus; Teleplay by : Sean Carley | October 26, 2004 | February 18, 2005 | 410 |
| 70 | 11 | "Voices Carry: Part One" | Phil Earnshaw | Sean Reycraft | November 2, 2004 | February 25, 2005 | 411 |
| 71 | 12 | "Voices Carry: Part Two" | Phil Earnshaw | Sean Reycraft | November 9, 2004 | March 4, 2005 | 412 |
| 72 | 13 | "Bark at the Moon" | Ron Murphy | Story by : Sean Reycraft; Teleplay by : Aaron Martin | November 23, 2004 | March 11, 2005 | 413 |
| 73 | 14 | "Secret: Part 1" | Eleanore Lindo | Shelley Scarrow | November 30, 2004 | July 1, 2005 | 414 |
| 74 | 15 | "Secret: Part 2" | Eleanore Lindo | Shelley Scarrow | December 7, 2004 | July 1, 2005 | 415 |
| 75 | 16 | "Eye of the Tiger" | Ron Murphy | Story by : Brendon Yorke & R. Scott Cooper; Teleplay by : Brendon Yorke | December 14, 2004 | July 8, 2005 | 416 |
| 76 | 17 | "Queen of Hearts" | Sudz Sutherland | Sean Reycraft | January 17, 2005 | July 15, 2005 | 417 |
| 77 | 18 | "Modern Love" | Sudz Sutherland | Story by : Miklos Perlus; Teleplay by : Shelley Scarrow | January 24, 2005 | July 22, 2005 | 418 |
| 78 | 19 | "Moonlight Desires" | Phil Earnshaw | Story by : Aaron Martin; Teleplay by : Sean Reycraft | January 31, 2005 | July 29, 2005 | 419 |
| 79 | 20 | "West End Girls" | Phil Earnshaw | Shelley Scarrow | January 31, 2005 | August 12, 2005 | 420 |
| 80 | 21 | "Goin' Down the Road: Part 1" | Graeme Campbell | Aaron Martin | February 7, 2005 | August 19, 2005 | 421 |
| 81 | 22 | "Goin' Down the Road: Part 2" | Graeme Campbell | Aaron Martin | February 14, 2005 | August 26, 2005 | 422 |

=== Season 5 (2005–06) ===
| No. overall | No. in season | Title | Directed by | Written by | Canada airdate | U.S. airdate | Prod. code |
|---|---|---|---|---|---|---|---|
| 82 | 1 | "Venus: Part 1" | Phil Earnshaw | Story by : Sean Reycraft & Shelley Scarrow; Teleplay by : Shelley Scarrow | September 19, 2005 | October 7, 2005 | 501 |
| 83 | 2 | "Venus: Part 2" | Phil Earnshaw | Story by : Sean Reycraft & Shelley Scarrow; Teleplay by : Shelley Scarrow | September 26, 2005 | October 7, 2005 | 502 |
| 84 | 3 | "Death of a Disco Dancer" | Stefan Scaini | Sean Reycraft | October 3, 2005 | October 14, 2005 | 503 |
| 85 | 4 | "Foolin" | Stefan Scaini | Story by : Brendon Yorke & Miklos Perlus; Teleplay by : Brendon Yorke | October 10, 2005 | October 21, 2005 | 504 |
| 86 | 5 | "Weddings, Parties, Anything" | Phil Earnshaw | Story by : James Hurst & Alexandra Zarowny; Teleplay by : James Hurst | October 17, 2005 | November 4, 2005 | 505 |
| 87 | 6 | "I Still Haven't Found What I'm Looking For" | Phil Earnshaw | Story by : Miklos Perlus & James Hurst; Teleplay by : Miklos Perlus | October 24, 2005 | November 11, 2005 | 506 |
| 88 | 7 | "Turned Out: Part 1" | Eleanore Lindo | Brendon Yorke | October 31, 2005 | November 18, 2005 | 507 |
| 89 | 8 | "Turned Out: Part 2" | Eleanore Lindo | Brendon Yorke | November 7, 2005 | December 2, 2005 | 508 |
| 90 | 9 | "Tell It to My Heart" | Stefan Scaini | Brendon Yorke | November 14, 2005 | December 9, 2005 | 509 |
| 91 | 10 | "Redemption Song" | Stefan Scaini | Story by : Alexandra Zarowny & James Hurst; Teleplay by : Alexandra Zarowny | November 21, 2005 | December 16, 2005 | 510 |
| 92 | 11 | "The Lexicon of Love: Part One" | Phil Earnshaw | Story by : Sean Reycraft & Kate Melville; Teleplay by : Sean Reycraft | November 28, 2005 | April 7, 2006 | 511 |
| 93 | 12 | "The Lexicon of Love: Part Two" | Phil Earnshaw | Story by : Sean Reycraft & Kate Melville; Teleplay by : Sean Reycraft | December 5, 2005 | April 7, 2006 | 512 |
| 94 | 13 | "Together Forever" | Ron Oliver | Story by : Aaron Martin & Brendon Yorke; Teleplay by : Aaron Martin | December 12, 2005 | April 14, 2006 | 513 |
| 95 | 14 | "I Against I" | Stefan Scaini | Story by : Aaron Martin & Brendon Yorke; Teleplay by : James Hurst | January 30, 2006 | April 21, 2006 | 514 |
| 96 | 15 | "Our Lips Are Sealed: Part 1" | Stefan Scaini | Story by : Kate Melville & Sean Reycraft; Teleplay by : Kate Melville | February 20, 2006 | May 5, 2006 | 515 |
| 97 | 16 | "Our Lips Are Sealed: Part 2" | Ron Oliver | Story by : James Hurst & Avra Fein; Teleplay by : James Hurst & Alexandra Zarowny | February 27, 2006 | May 12, 2006 | 516 |
| 98 | 17 | "Total Eclipse of the Heart" | Ron Oliver | Story by : Aaron Martin & James Hurst; Teleplay by : Aaron Martin | March 6, 2006 | May 19, 2006 | 517 |
| 99 | 18 | "High Fidelity: Part One" | Phil Earnshaw | Brendon Yorke | March 13, 2006 | June 2, 2006 | 518 |
| 100 | 19 | "High Fidelity: Part Two" | Phil Earnshaw | James Hurst | March 20, 2006 | June 9, 2006 | 519 |

=== Season 6 (2006–07) ===
| No. overall | No. in season | Title | Canada airdate | U.S. airdate | Prod. code |
|---|---|---|---|---|---|
| 101–102 | 1–2 | "Here Comes Your Man" | November 28, 2006 | September 29, 2006 | 601 & 602 |
| 103 | 3 | "True Colours" | December 5, 2006 | October 6, 2006 | 603 |
| 104 | 4 | "Can't Hardly Wait" | December 5, 2006 | October 13, 2006 | 604 |
| 105 | 5 | "Eyes Without a Face" Part One | December 12, 2006 | October 20, 2006 | 605 |
| 106 | 6 | "Eyes Without a Face" Part Two | December 12, 2006 | November 3, 2006 | 606 |
| 107 | 7 | "Working for the Weekend" | December 19, 2006 | November 10, 2006 | 607 |
| 108 | 8 | "Crazy Little Thing Called Love" | December 19, 2006 | November 17, 2006 | 608 |
| 109 | 9 | "What's It Feel Like to Be a Ghost?" Part One | January 2, 2007 | January 5, 2007 | 609 |
| 110 | 10 | "What's It Feel Like to Be a Ghost?" Part Two | January 2, 2007 | January 12, 2007 | 610 |
| 111 | 11 | "Rock This Town" | January 9, 2007 | January 26, 2007 | 611 |
| 112 | 12 | "The Bitterest Pill" | January 9, 2007 | February 2, 2007 | 612 |
| 113 | 13 | "If You Leave" | April 9, 2007 | February 16, 2007 | 613 |
| 114 | 14 | "Free Fallin'" Part One | March 28, 2007 | June 29, 2007 | 614 |
| 115 | 15 | "Free Fallin'" Part Two | April 4, 2007 | July 6, 2007 | 615 |
| 116 | 16 | "Love My Way" | April 16, 2007 | July 13, 2007 | 616 |
| 117 | 17 | "Sunglasses at Night" | April 23, 2007 | July 20, 2007 | 617 |
| 118 | 18 | "Don't You Want Me?" Part One | May 7, 2007 | July 27, 2007 | 618 |
| 119 | 19 | "Don't You Want Me?" Part Two | May 14, 2007 | August 3, 2007 | 619 |

=== Season 7 (2007–08) ===
| No. overall | No. in season | Title | Canada airdate | U.S. airdate | Prod. code |
|---|---|---|---|---|---|
| 120 | 1 | "Standing in the Dark" Part One | 14 January 2008 | 5 October 2007 | 701 |
| 121 | 2 | "Standing in the Dark" Part Two | 21 January 2008 | 5 October 2007 | 702 |
| 122 | 3 | "Love Is a Battlefield" | 19 May 2008 | 12 October 2007 | 703 |
| 123 | 4 | "It's Tricky" | 28 January 2008 | 19 October 2007 | 704 |
| 124 | 5 | "Death or Glory" Part One | 4 February 2008 | 2 November 2007 | 705 |
| 125 | 6 | "Death or Glory" Part Two | 11 February 2008 | 9 November 2007 | 706 |
| 126 | 7 | "We Got the Beat" | 18 February 2008 | 16 November 2007 | 707 |
| 127 | 8 | "Jessie's Girl" | 25 February 2008 | 8 February 2008 | 708 |
| 128 | 9 | "Hungry Eyes" | 3 March 2008 | 15 February 2008 | 709 |
| 129 | 10 | "Pass the Dutchie" | 10 March 2008 | 22 February 2008 | 710 |
| 130 | 11 | "Owner of a Lonely Heart" | 17 March 2008 | 29 February 2008 | 711 |
| 131 | 12 | "Live to Tell" | 24 March 2008 | 7 March 2008 | 712 |
| 132 | 13 | "Bust a Move" Part One | 31 March 2008 | 4 April 2008 | 713 |
| 133 | 14 | "Bust a Move" Part Two | 7 April 2008 | 4 April 2008 | 714 |
| 134 | 15 | "Got My Mind Set on You" | 14 April 2008 | 11 April 2008 | 715 |
| 135 | 16 | "Sweet Child o' Mine" | 21 April 2008 | 18 April 2008 | 716 |
| 136 | 17 | "Talking in Your Sleep" | 28 April 2008 | 9 May 2008 | 717 |
| 137 | 18 | "Another Brick in the Wall" | 5 May 2008 | 25 April 2008 | 718 |
| 138 | 19 | "Broken Wings" | 12 May 2008 | 20 May 2008 | 719 |
| 139 | 20 | "Ladies' Night" | 26 May 2008 | 28 May 2008 | 720 |
| 140 | 21 | "Everything She Wants" | 2 June 2008 | 2 June 2008 | 721 |
| 141 | 22 | "Don't Stop Believin'" | 9 June 2008 | 9 June 2008 | 722 |
| 142 | 23 | "If This Is It" | 16 June 2008 | 16 June 2008 | 723 |
| 143 | 24 | "We Built This City" | 23 June 2008 | 23 June 2008 | 724 |

=== Specials (2007–15) ===
In addition to the 385 regular episodes, nine "special episodes" have been produced, which are not considered to be part of the Degrassi continuity.

"Degrassi in Kenya" ("Degrassi: Doing What Matters" in the United States) aired October 18, 2007, on MTV Canada and March 14, 2008, on The N. It documented the Degrassi: The Next Generation cast visiting the Masai Mara in Kenya to build an extension onto Motony Primary School. "Degrassi of the Dead", parodying the zombie movie Dawn of the Dead, was a Halloween special episode which aired on the N on October 26, 2007, and four days later on CTV. The episode was not part of the Degrassi continuity, although the first fifteen minutes did feature a number of actors in character, some of whom had turned into zombies after eating genetically modified food in the school cafeteria, while others were trying to escape. The second half of the episode was a behind-the-scenes look with actors Cassie Steele, Aubrey Graham and Lauren Collins. It was directed by Stefan Brogren, and originally made as five online-only Degrassi Minis, with an additional streaming video of Aubrey Graham dancing to a Halloween-themed rap performed by Brogren. The third was a second Halloween special called "Curse of Degrassi", which aired on the N on October 24 and on CTV on October 26, 2008. In this special, Rick Murray's ghost possesses Holly J. and begins tormenting the students who laughed at him on the day of the "Whack-Your-Brain" incident which eventually led to his death. A third horror-themed special aired as part of season 11; however, "Nowhere to Run" is part of the continuity.

"Degrassi in Ecuador" aired in December 2008, in both Canada and the United States; it documented the cast visiting Ecuador. "Degrassi in India" aired a number of times on MuchMusic during the 2010 holiday break but was promoted as premiering on December 29, 2010; it documented the cast visiting India. Also airing during the holiday break was "Degrassi in Haiti", produced and aired in 2011. A number of other specials have also aired, documenting a MuchMusic VJ visiting the set of Degrassi, at Epitome Studios.

| Title | Season | Canadian airdate | US airdate |
|---|---|---|---|
| "Degrassi in Kenya" | 7 | October 18, 2007 | March 14, 2008 |
| "Degrassi of the Dead" | 7 | October 31, 2007 | October 26, 2007 |
| "The Curse of Degrassi" | 8 | October 26, 2008 | October 24, 2008 |
| "Degrassi in Ecuador" | 8 | December 18, 2008 | December 19, 2008 |
| "Degrassi in India" | 10 | December 24, 2010 | November 4, 2011 |
| "Degrassi in Haiti" | 11 | December 30, 2011 | December 30, 2011 |
| "Degrassi in Ghana" | 12 | December 2, 2012 | December 2, 2012 |
| "Degrassi in Nicaragua" | 13 | October 3, 2013 | October 3, 2013 |
| "It Goes There: Degrassi's Most Talked About Moments" | 14 | N/A | July 31, 2015 |

=== Season 8 (2008–09) ===
| No. overall | No. in season | Title | Directed by | Written by | Canada airdate | U.S. airdate | Prod. code |
|---|---|---|---|---|---|---|---|
| 144 | 1 | "Uptown Girl: Part One" | Phil Earnshaw | Brendon Yorke | October 5, 2008 | October 10, 2008 | 801 |
| 145 | 2 | "Uptown Girl: Part Two" | Phil Earnshaw | Duana Taha | October 12, 2008 | October 10, 2008 | 802 |
| 146 | 3 | "Fight the Power" | Eleanore Lindo | Matt Huether | October 19, 2008 | October 17, 2008 | 803 |
| 147 | 4 | "Didn't We Almost Have It All" | Eleanore Lindo | Sarah Glinski | November 2, 2008 | October 24, 2008 | 804 |
| 148 | 5 | "Man with Two Hearts" | Graeme Campbell | Matt MacLennan | November 9, 2008 | November 7, 2008 | 805 |
| 149 | 6 | "With or Without You" | Graeme Campbell | Sara Snow | November 16, 2008 | November 14, 2008 | 806 |
| 150 | 7 | "Money for Nothing" | Sturla Gunnarsson | Jeremy Boxen | November 23, 2008 | November 21, 2008 | 807 |
| 151 | 8 | "Lost in Love: Part 1" | Bruce McDonald | Matt Huether | November 30, 2008 | February 13, 2009 | 808 |
| 152 | 9 | "Lost in Love: Part 2" | Bruce McDonald | Sarah Glinski | January 18, 2009 | February 13, 2009 | 809 |
| 153 | 10 | "Bad Medicine" | Sturla Gunnarsson | Michael Grassi | January 25, 2009 | February 20, 2009 | 810 |
| 154 | 11 | "Causing a Commotion" | Marni Banack | Sarah Glinski | February 8, 2009 | February 27, 2009 | 811 |
| 155 | 12 | "Heat of the Moment" | Marni Banack | Julia Cohen & Lara Azzopardi | February 15, 2009 | March 6, 2009 | 812 |
| 156 | 13 | "Jane Says: Part 1" | Thom Best | Brendon Yorke | March 1, 2009 | July 3, 2009 | 813 |
| 157 | 14 | "Jane Says: Part 2" | Thom Best | Duana Taha | March 8, 2009 | July 3, 2009 | 814 |
| 158 | 15 | "Touch of Grey" | Phil Earnshaw | Matt Huether | March 15, 2009 | July 10, 2009 | 815 |
| 159 | 16 | "Heart of Glass" | Phil Earnshaw | Sarah Glinski | March 22, 2009 | July 17, 2009 | 816 |
| 160 | 17 | "Up Where We Belong" | Pat Williams | Michael Grassi | April 5, 2009 | July 24, 2009 | 817 |
| 161 | 18 | "Danger Zone" | Pat Williams | Sara Snow | April 12, 2009 | July 31, 2009 | 818 |
| 162–165 | 19–22 | "Degrassi Goes Hollywood" "Paradise City" | Stefan Brogren | Story by : Matt Huether & Vera Santamaria & Sara Snow; Teleplay by : Sarah Glinski & Matt Huether & Vera Santamaria & Sara Snow | August 30, 2009 | August 14, 2009 | 819–822 |

=== Season 9 (2009–10) ===
| No. overall | No. in season | Title | Canada airdate | U.S. airdate | Prod. code |
|---|---|---|---|---|---|
| 166–167 | 1–2 | "Just Can't Get Enough" | October 4, 2009 | October 9, 2009 | 901 & 902 |
| 168 | 3 | "Shoot to Thrill" | October 18, 2009 | October 16, 2009 | 903 |
| 169 | 4 | "Close to Me" | October 11, 2009 | October 23, 2009 | 904 |
| 170 | 5 | "You Be Illin'" | October 18, 2009 | October 30, 2009 | 905 |
| 171 | 6 | "Wanna Be Startin' Somethin'" | October 11, 2009 | November 6, 2009 | 906 |
| 172 | 7 | "Beat It" Part One | November 1, 2009 | November 13, 2009 | 907 |
| 173 | 8 | "Beat It" Part Two | November 1, 2009 | November 20, 2009 | 908 |
| 174 | 9 | "Waiting for a Girl Like You" | November 8, 2009 | February 6, 2010 | 909 |
| 175 | 10 | "Somebody" | November 8, 2009 | February 6, 2010 | 910 |
| 176 | 11 | "Heart Like Mine" Part One | November 15, 2009 | April 9, 2010 | 911 |
| 177 | 12 | "Heart Like Mine" Part Two | November 15, 2009 | April 16, 2010 | 912 |
| 178 | 13 | "Holiday Road" | November 22, 2009 | April 23, 2010 | 913 |
| 179 | 14 | "Start Me Up" | November 22, 2009 | April 30, 2010 | 914 |
| 180–181 | 15–16 | "Why Can't This Be Love?" "Broken PROMises" | April 2, 2010 | 915 | |
| 182 | 17 | "Innocent When You Dream" | May 24, 2010 | May 7, 2010 | 917 |
| 183 | 18 | "In Your Eyes" | May 31, 2010 | May 14, 2010 | 918 |
| 184 | 19 | "Keep on Loving You" | June 7, 2010 | May 21, 2010 | 919 |
| 185–188 | 20–23 | "Degrassi Takes Manhattan" "The Rest of My Life" | July 16, 2010 | July 19, 2010 | 920–923 |

=== Season 10 (2010–11) ===
| No. overall | No. in season | Title | Canada airdate | U.S. airdate | Prod. code |
|---|---|---|---|---|---|
| 189 | 1 | "What a Girl Wants" Part One | July 19, 2010 | July 20, 2010 | 1001 |
| 190 | 2 | "What a Girl Wants" Part Two | July 20, 2010 | July 21, 2010 | 1002 |
| 191 | 3 | "Breakaway" Part One | July 21, 2010 | July 22, 2010 | 1003 |
| 192 | 4 | "Breakaway" Part Two | July 22, 2010 | July 23, 2010 | 1004 |
| 193 | 5 | "99 Problems" Part One | July 26, 2010 | July 26, 2010 | 1005 |
| 194 | 6 | "99 Problems" Part Two | July 27, 2010 | July 27, 2010 | 1006 |
| 195 | 7 | "Better Off Alone" Part One | July 28, 2010 | July 28, 2010 | 1007 |
| 196 | 8 | "Better Off Alone" Part Two | July 29, 2010 | July 29, 2010 | 1008 |
| 197 | 9 | "I Just Don't Know What to Do with Myself" Part One | August 2, 2010 | August 2, 2010 | 1009 |
| 198 | 10 | "I Just Don't Know What to Do with Myself" Part Two | August 3, 2010 | August 3, 2010 | 1010 |
| 199 | 11 | "Try Honesty" Part One | August 4, 2010 | August 4, 2010 | 1011 |
| 200 | 12 | "Try Honesty" Part Two | August 5, 2010 | August 5, 2010 | 1012 |
| 201 | 13 | "You Don't Know My Name" Part One | August 9, 2010 | August 9, 2010 | 1013 |
| 202 | 14 | "You Don't Know My Name" Part Two | August 10, 2010 | August 10, 2010 | 1014 |
| 203 | 15 | "My Body Is a Cage" Part One | August 11, 2010 | August 11, 2010 | 1015 |
| 204 | 16 | "My Body Is a Cage" Part Two | August 12, 2010 | August 12, 2010 | 1016 |
| 205 | 17 | "Tears Dry on Their Own" Part One | August 16, 2010 | August 16, 2010 | 1017 |
| 206 | 18 | "Tears Dry on Their Own" Part Two | August 17, 2010 | August 17, 2010 | 1018 |
| 207 | 19 | "Still Fighting It" Part One | August 18, 2010 | August 18, 2010 | 1019 |
| 208 | 20 | "Still Fighting It" Part Two | August 19, 2010 | August 19, 2010 | 1020 |
| 209 | 21 | "Purple Pills" Part One | August 23, 2010 | August 23, 2010 | 1021 |
| 210 | 22 | "Purple Pills" Part Two | August 24, 2010 | August 24, 2010 | 1022 |
| 211 | 23 | "All Falls Down" Part One | August 25, 2010 | August 25, 2010 | 1023 |
| 212 | 24 | "All Falls Down" Part Two | August 26, 2010 | August 26, 2010 | 1024 |
Part 2
| 213 | 25 | "Don't Let Me Get Me" Part One | October 8, 2010 | October 8, 2010 | 1025 |
| 214 | 26 | "Don't Let Me Get Me" Part Two | October 8, 2010 | October 8, 2010 | 1026 |
| 215 | 27 | "Love Lockdown" Part One | October 15, 2010 | October 15, 2010 | 1027 |
| 216 | 28 | "Love Lockdown" Part Two | October 22, 2010 | October 22, 2010 | 1028 |
| 217 | 29 | "Umbrella" Part One | October 29, 2010 | October 29, 2010 | 1029 |
| 218 | 30 | "Umbrella" Part Two | November 5, 2010 | November 5, 2010 | 1030 |
| 219 | 31 | "Halo" Part One | November 12, 2010 | November 12, 2010 | 1031 |
| 220 | 32 | "Halo" Part Two | November 19, 2010 | November 19, 2010 | 1032 |
Part 3
| 221 | 33 | "When Love Takes Over" Part One | February 11, 2011 | February 11, 2011 | 1033 |
| 222 | 34 | "When Love Takes Over" Part Two | February 11, 2011 | February 11, 2011 | 1034 |
| 223 | 35 | "The Way We Get By" Part One | February 18, 2011 | February 18, 2011 | 1035 |
| 224 | 36 | "The Way We Get By" Part Two | February 25, 2011 | February 25, 2011 | 1036 |
| 225 | 37 | "Jesus, Etc." Part One | March 4, 2011 | March 4, 2011 | 1037 |
| 226 | 38 | "Jesus, Etc." Part Two | March 11, 2011 | March 11, 2011 | 1038 |
| 227 | 39 | "Hide and Seek" Part One | March 18, 2011 | March 18, 2011 | 1039 |
| 228 | 40 | "Hide and Seek" Part Two | March 25, 2011 | March 25, 2011 | 1040 |
| 229 | 41 | "Chasing Pavements" Part One | April 1, 2011 | April 1, 2011 | 1041 |
| 230 | 42 | "Chasing Pavements" Part Two | April 8, 2011 | April 8, 2011 | 1042 |
| 231 | 43 | "Drop the World" Part One | April 15, 2011 | April 15, 2011 | 1043 |
| 232 | 44 | "Drop the World" Part Two | April 22, 2011 | April 22, 2011 | 1044 |

=== Season 11 (2011–12) ===
| No. overall | No. in season | Title | Canada airdate | U.S. airdate | Prod. code |
|---|---|---|---|---|---|
| 233–234 | 1–2 | "Boom Boom Pow" | July 18, 2011 | July 18, 2011 | 1101 & 1102 |
| 247 | 15 | "U Don't Know" Part Two | August 9, 2011 | August 9, 2011 | 1115 |
| 248 | 16 | "Lose Yourself" Part One | August 10, 2011 | August 10, 2011 | 1116 |
| 17 | 249 | "Lose Yourself" Part Two | August 11, 2011 | August 11, 2011 | 1117 |
| 250 | 18 | "Mr. Brightside" Part One | August 15, 2011 | August 15, 2011 | 1118 |
| 251 | 19 | "Mr. Brightside" Part Two | August 16, 2011 | August 16, 2011 | 1119 |
| 252 | 20 | "Extraordinary Machine" Part One | August 17, 2011 | August 17, 2011 | 1120 |
| 253 | 21 | "Extraordinary Machine" Part Two | August 18, 2011 | August 18, 2011 | 1121 |
| 254 | 22 | "Drop It Like It's Hot" Part One | August 22, 2011 | August 22, 2011 | 1122 |
| 255 | 23 | "Drop It Like It's Hot" Part Two | August 23, 2011 | August 23, 2011 | 1123 |
| 256 | 24 | "Don't Panic" Part One | August 24, 2011 | August 24, 2011 | 1124 |
| 257 | 25 | "Don't Panic" Part Two | August 25, 2011 | August 25, 2011 | 1125 |
| 258 | 26 | "Take a Bow" Part One | August 29, 2011 | August 29, 2011 | 1126 |
| 259 | 27 | "Take a Bow" Part Two | August 30, 2011 | August 30, 2011 | 1127 |
| 260 | 28 | "Dead & Gone" Part One | August 31, 2011 | August 31, 2011 | 1128 |
| 261 | 29 | "Dead & Gone" Part Two | September 1, 2011 | September 1, 2011 | 1129 |
Part 2
| 262–263 | 30–31 | "Nowhere to Run" | October 24, 2011 | November 18, 2011 | 1130 & 1131 |
| 264 | 32 | "Underneath It All" Part One | February 24, 2012 | February 20, 2012 | 1132 |
| 265 | 33 | "Underneath It All" Part Two | February 24, 2012 | February 24, 2012 | 1133 |
| 266 | 34 | "Can't Tell Me Nothing" Part One | March 2, 2012 | March 2, 2012 | 1134 |
| 267 | 35 | "Can't Tell Me Nothing" Part Two | March 9, 2012 | March 9, 2012 | 1135 |
| 268 | 36 | "Not Ready to Make Nice" Part One | March 16, 2012 | March 16, 2012 | 1136 |
| 269 | 37 | "Not Ready to Make Nice" Part Two | March 23, 2012 | March 23, 2012 | 1137 |
| 270 | 38 | "Need You Now" Part One | March 30, 2012 | March 30, 2012 | 1138 |
| 271 | 39 | "Need You Now" Part Two | April 6, 2012 | April 6, 2012 | 1139 |
| 272 | 40 | "Smash Into You" Part One | April 13, 2012 | April 13, 2012 | 1140 |
| 273 | 41 | "Smash Into You" Part Two | April 20, 2012 | April 20, 2012 | 1141 |
| 274 | 42 | "Hollaback Girl" Part One | April 27, 2012 | April 27, 2012 | 1142 |
| 275 | 43 | "Hollaback Girl" Part Two | May 4, 2012 | May 4, 2012 | 1143 |
| 276 | 44 | "In the Cold, Cold Night" Part One | May 11, 2012 | May 11, 2012 | 1144 |
| 277 | 45 | "In the Cold, Cold Night" Part Two | May 18, 2012 | May 18, 2012 | 1145 |

=== Season 12 (2012–13) ===
| No. overall | No. in season | Title | Canada airdate | U.S. airdate | Prod. code |
|---|---|---|---|---|---|
| 278 | 1 | "Come as You Are" Part One | July 16, 2012 | July 16, 2012 | 1201 |
| 279 | 2 | "Come as You Are" Part Two | July 17, 2012 | July 17, 2012 | 1202 |
| 280 | 3 | "Walking on Broken Glass" Part One | July 18, 2012 | July 18, 2012 | 1203 |
| 281 | 4 | "Walking on Broken Glass" Part Two | July 19, 2012 | July 19, 2012 | 1204 |
| 282 | 5 | "Got Your Money" Part One | July 23, 2012 | July 23, 2012 | 1205 |
| 283 | 6 | "Got Your Money" Part Two | July 24, 2012 | July 24, 2012 | 1206 |
| 284 | 7 | "Say It Ain't So" Part One | July 25, 2012 | July 25, 2012 | 1207 |
| 285 | 8 | "Say It Ain't So" Part Two | July 26, 2012 | July 26, 2012 | 1208 |
| 286 | 9 | "Closer to Free" Part One | July 30, 2012 | July 30, 2012 | 1209 |
| 287 | 10 | "Closer to Free" Part Two | July 31, 2012 | July 31, 2012 | 1210 |
| 288 | 11 | "Waterfalls" Part One | August 1, 2012 | August 1, 2012 | 1211 |
| 289 | 12 | "Waterfalls" Part Two | August 2, 2012 | August 2, 2012 | 1212 |
| 290 | 13 | "Rusty Cage" Part One | August 6, 2012 | August 6, 2012 | 1213 |
| 291 | 14 | "Rusty Cage" Part Two | August 7, 2012 | August 7, 2012 | 1214 |
| 292 | 15 | "Never Ever" Part One | August 8, 2012 | August 8, 2012 | 1215 |
| 293 | 16 | "Never Ever" Part Two | August 9, 2012 | August 9, 2012 | 1216 |
| 294 | 17 | "Sabotage" Part One | August 13, 2012 | August 13, 2012 | 1217 |
| 295 | 18 | "Sabotage" Part Two | August 14, 2012 | August 14, 2012 | 1218 |
| 296 | 19 | "Scream" Part One | August 15, 2012 | August 15, 2012 | 1219 |
| 297 | 20 | "Scream" Part Two | August 16, 2012 | August 16, 2012 | 1220 |
| 298 | 21 | "Building a Mystery" Part One | October 12, 2012 | October 12, 2012 | 1221 |
| 299 | 22 | "Building a Mystery" Part Two | October 19, 2012 | October 19, 2012 | 1222 |
| 300 | 23 | "Doll Parts" Part One | October 26, 2012 | October 26, 2012 | 1223 |
| 301 | 24 | "Doll Parts" Part Two | November 2, 2012 | November 2, 2012 | 1224 |
| 302 | 25 | "I Want It That Way" Part One | November 9, 2012 | November 9, 2012 | 1225 |
| 303 | 26 | "I Want It That Way" Part Two | November 16, 2012 | November 16, 2012 | 1226 |
| 304 | 27 | "Tonight, Tonight" Part One | November 23, 2012 | November 20, 2012 | 1227 |
| 305 | 28 | "Tonight, Tonight" Part Two | November 23, 2012 | November 20, 2012 | 1228 |
| 306—307 | 29—30 | "Degrassi: Las Vegas" "Lovefool" | December 14, 2012 | December 14, 2012 | 1229 & 1230 |
Part 2
| 308 | 31 | "Bitter Sweet Symphony" Part One | February 15, 2013 | February 15, 2013 | 1231 |
| 309 | 32 | "Bitter Sweet Symphony" Part Two | February 22, 2013 | February 22, 2013 | 1232 |
| 310 | 33 | "Ray of Light" Part One | March 1, 2013 | March 1, 2013 | 1233 |
| 311 | 34 | "Ray of Light" Part Two | March 8, 2013 | March 8, 2013 | 1234 |
| 312 | 35 | "Karma Police" Part One | March 15, 2013 | March 15, 2013 | 1235 |
| 313 | 36 | "Karma Police" Part Two | March 22, 2013 | March 22, 2013 | 1236 |
| 314 | 37 | "Zombie" Part One | March 29, 2013 | March 29, 2013 | 1237 |
| 315 | 38 | "Zombie" Part Two | April 5, 2013 | April 5, 2013 | 1238 |
| 316–317 | 39–40 | "The Time of My Life" | June 21, 2013 | June 21, 2013 | 1239 & 1240 |

=== Season 13 (2013–14) ===
| No. overall | No. in season | Title | Canada airdate | U.S. airdate | Prod. code |
|---|---|---|---|---|---|
| 318–319 | 1–2 | "Summertime" | July 11, 2013 | July 11, 2013 | 1301 & 1302 |
| 320 | 3 | "All I Wanna Do" | July 18, 2013 | July 18, 2013 | 1303 |
| 321 | 4 | "My Own Worst Enemy" | July 25, 2013 | July 25, 2013 | 1304 |
| 322 | 5 | "About a Girl" | August 1, 2013 | August 1, 2013 | 1305 |
| 323 | 6 | "Cannonball" | August 8, 2013 | August 8, 2013 | 1306 |
| 324 | 7 | "Honey" | August 15, 2013 | August 15, 2013 | 1307 |
| 325 | 8 | "Young Forever" | August 22, 2013 | August 22, 2013 | 1308 |
Part 2
| 326 | 9 | "This Is How We Do It" | October 3, 2013 | October 3, 2013 | 1309 |
| 327 | 10 | "You Got Me" | October 10, 2013 | October 10, 2013 | 1310 |
| 328 | 11 | "You Oughta Know" | October 17, 2013 | October 17, 2013 | 1311 |
| 329 | 12 | "Everything You've Done Wrong" | October 24, 2013 | October 24, 2013 | 1312 |
| 330 | 13 | "Who Do You Think You Are" | October 31, 2013 | October 31, 2013 | 1313 |
| 331 | 14 | "Barely Breathing" | November 7, 2013 | November 7, 2013 | 1314 |
| 332 | 15 | "Black or White" | November 14, 2013 | November 14, 2013 | 1315 |
| 333 | 16 | "Spiderwebs" | November 21, 2013 | November 21, 2013 | 1316 |
Part 3
| 334 | 17 | "The World I Know" | January 28, 2014 | January 28, 2014 | 1317 |
| 335 | 18 | "Better Man" | February 4, 2014 | February 4, 2014 | 1318 |
| 336 | 19 | "Dig Me Out" | February 11, 2014 | February 11, 2014 | 1319 |
| 337 | 20 | "Power to the People" | February 18, 2014 | February 18, 2014 | 1320 |
| 338 | 21 | "No Surprises" | February 25, 2014 | February 25, 2014 | 1321 |
| 339 | 22 | "Basket Case" | March 4, 2014 | March 4, 2014 | 1322 |
| 340–341 | 23–24 | "Unbelievable" | March 11, 2014 | March 11, 2014 | 1323 & 1324 |
| 342 | 25 | "What It's Like" | March 18, 2014 | March 18, 2014 | 1325 |
| 343 | 26 | "Close to Me" | March 25, 2014 | March 25, 2014 | 1326 |
| 344 | 27 | "Army of Me" | April 1, 2014 | April 1, 2014 | 1327 |
| 345 | 28 | "Everything Is Everything" | April 8, 2014 | April 8, 2014 | 1328 |
| 346 | 29 | "Sparks Will Fly" Part One | April 15, 2014 | April 15, 2014 | 1329 |
| 347 | 30 | "Sparks Will Fly" Part Two | April 22, 2014 | April 22, 2014 | 1330 |
Part 4
| 348 | 31 | "You Are Not Alone" | June 3, 2014 | June 3, 2014 | 1331 |
| 349 | 32 | "Enjoy the Silence" | June 10, 2014 | June 10, 2014 | 1332 |
| 350 | 33 | "How Bizarre" | June 17, 2014 | June 17, 2014 | 1333 |
| 351 | 34 | "My Hero" | June 24, 2014 | June 24, 2014 | 1334 |
| 352 | 35 | "Hypnotize" | July 1, 2014 | July 1, 2014 | 1335 |
| 353 | 36 | "Out of My Head" | July 8, 2014 | July 8, 2014 | 1336 |
| 354 | 37 | "Believe" Part One | July 15, 2014 | July 15, 2014 | 1337 |
| 355 | 38 | "Believe" Part Two | July 22, 2014 | July 22, 2014 | 1338 |
| 356—357 | 39—40 | "Thunderstruck" | July 29, 2014 | July 29, 2014 | 1339 & 1340 |

=== Season 14 (2014–15) ===
| No. overall | No. in season | Title | Canada airdate | U.S. airdate | Prod. code |
|---|---|---|---|---|---|
| 358 | 1 | "Smells Like Teen Spirit" | October 28, 2014 | October 28, 2014 | 1401 |
| 359 | 2 | "Wise Up" | November 4, 2014 | November 4, 2014 | 1402 |
| 360 | 3 | "If You Could Only See" | November 11, 2014 | November 11, 2014 | 1403 |
| 361 | 4 | "Can't Stop This Thing We Started" | November 18, 2014 | November 18, 2014 | 1404 |
| 362 | 5 | "There's Your Trouble" | November 25, 2014 | November 25, 2014 | 1405 |
| 363 | 6 | "(You Drive Me) Crazy" | December 2, 2014 | December 2, 2014 | 1406 |
| 364 | 7 | "I'll Be Missing You" | December 9, 2014 | December 9, 2014 | 1407 |
| 365 | 8 | "Hush" | December 16, 2014 | December 16, 2014 | 1408 |
| 366 | 9 | "Something's Got to Give" | December 23, 2014 | December 23, 2014 | 1409 |
| 367 | 10 | "Hero vs. Villain" | December 30, 2014 | December 30, 2014 | 1410 |
| 368 | 11 | "Firestarter" Part One | January 6, 2015 | January 6, 2015 | 1411 |
| 369 | 12 | "Firestarter" Part Two | January 13, 2015 | January 13, 2015 | 1412 |
Part 2
| 370 | 13 | "Watch Out Now" | July 20, 2015 | July 20, 2015 | 1413 |
| 371 | 14 | "Ready or Not" | July 20, 2015 | July 20, 2015 | 1414 |
| 372 | 15 | "Wishlist" | July 21, 2015 | July 21, 2015 | 1415 |
| 373 | 16 | "Walking in My Shoes" | July 22, 2015 | July 22, 2015 | 1416 |
| 374 | 17 | "Get It Together" | July 23, 2015 | July 23, 2015 | 1417 |
| 375 | 18 | "Give Me One Reason" | July 24, 2015 | July 24, 2015 | 1418 |
| 376 | 19 | "I Wanna Be Adored" | July 27, 2015 | July 27, 2015 | 1419 |
| 377 | 20 | "Teen Age Riot" | July 28, 2015 | July 28, 2015 | 1420 |
| 378 | 21 | "The Kids Aren't Alright" Part One | July 29, 2015 | July 29, 2015 | 1421 |
| 379 | 22 | "The Kids Aren't Alright" Part Two | July 30, 2015 | July 30, 2015 | 1422 |
| 380 | 23 | "Finally (1)" Part One | July 31, 2015 | July 31, 2015 | 1423 |
| 381 | 24 | "Finally (2)" Part Two | July 31, 2015 | July 31, 2015 | 1424 |
| 382–385 | 25–28 | "Degrassi: Don't Look Back" "Summer Girls" | August 2, 2015 | August 2, 2015 | 1425–1428 |
