= Degrassi: The Next Generation =

Canadian teen drama television series (2001–2015)

- Logo used in seasons 1–5 and 8 & 9
- Also known as: Degrassi (seasons 10–14)
- Genre: Teen drama Telenovela; Slice of life Soap Opera
- Created by: Yan Moore; Linda Schuyler
- Starring: Main cast
- Theme music composer: Jody Colero; Ben Nelson; Jim McGrath; Stephen Stohn
- Opening theme: "Whatever It Takes"
- Composers: Jim McGrath; Tim Welch
- Country of origin: Canada
- Original language: English
- No. of seasons: 14
- No. of episodes: 385 (list of episodes)

Production
- Executive producers: Linda Schuyler; Stephen Stohn; Aaron Martin; James Hurst; Brendon Yorke; Sara Snow; Sarah Glinski
- Producers: David Lowe; Stefan Brogren; Seyedeh Haerihendi
- Production locations: Toronto, Ontario
- Cinematography: Gavin Smith; John Berrie; Jim Westenbrink; Alwyn J. Kumst; Mitchell T. Ness
- Editors: Stephen Withrow; Jason B. Irvine; D. Gillian Truster; Gordon Thorne; Nicholas Wong
- Running time: 22 minutes
- Production companies: Epitome Pictures; Bell Media; Alliance Atlantis (2001–2008); Echo Bridge Entertainment (2008–2011); DHX Media (2015)

Original release
- Network: CTV
- Release: October 14, 2001 – November 22, 2009
- Network: MuchMusic
- Release: May 10, 2010 – August 22, 2013
- Network: MTV Canada
- Release: October 3, 2013 – August 2, 2015

Related
- Degrassi franchise

Degrassi: The Next Generation (re-titled to Degrassi for seasons 10 to 14) is a Canadian teen drama television series created by Yan Moore and Linda Schuyler. It is the fourth series in the Degrassi franchise and a revival of Degrassi Junior High and Degrassi High. It premiered on CTV on October 14, 2001, and concluded on August 2, 2015, on MTV Canada.

The series centers around a new ensemble cast of students at the fictional Degrassi Community School who face challenges such as sex, teen pregnancy, bullying, date rape, drug abuse, body image, homosexuality, domestic violence, gang violence, self-injury, suicide, abortion, mental disorders, and others. Various characters from the previous two series also returned as adults in recurring or guest roles.

The series was created by Linda Schuyler and Yan Moore, who was previously the head writer of Degrassi Junior High and Degrassi High. This was the first series to feature no involvement from Kit Hood, who was a co-creator and director of all previous Degrassi series. It was produced by Epitome Pictures (now a subsidiary of WildBrain) in association with Bell Media.

The series premiered to mixed reviews, with some critics expressing doubts about whether the show would achieve the same impact as its predecessors. However, it would ultimately garner both critical and commercial success similar to its forerunners. It received favourable reviews from critics of Entertainment Weekly, The New York Times, and AfterElton.

In its initial years, the show was frequently the most watched domestic drama series in Canada. In the United States, it became the highest-rated show on Noggin's teen block The N. By 2004, the series had averaged nearly a million viewers in Canada and half a million viewers in the United States. In Canada, the series received awards from the Geminis, Writers Guild of Canada, and the Directors Guild of Canada. Internationally, it also won several Teen Choice Awards, Young Artist Awards, and Prix Jeunesse. The episode "My Body Is a Cage", in which a character is outed as transgender, won a Peabody Award in 2011.

During its later seasons, the show's format underwent several changes following Viacom's involvement. In the tenth season, the airing schedule transitioned to a telenovela format during the summer months before returning to its standard schedule for the fall and spring. The series was also moved to MuchMusic in Canada.

The thirteenth season reverted to a weekly schedule and, part way through, it had moved to MTV Canada, where it aired until its final episode on August 2, 2015, after fourteen seasons. The show was followed by Degrassi: Next Class, which followed the remaining juniors from the show's later seasons as well as introducing newer ones, in 2016.

== Production ==
=== Concept ===
The Degrassi universe was created in 1979 by Playing With Time, a production company owned by former schoolteacher Linda Schuyler and her partner Kit Hood. The franchise began with The Kids of Degrassi Street, which was spawned out of three half-hour short films, and came to prominence with the critical and commercial successes of Degrassi Junior High, which debuted in 1987, and Degrassi High, which premiered in 1989. The two series followed an ensemble cast of students attending the titular schools as they confronted various issues. It became an international sensation, with the shows experiencing upwards of a million viewers on average in Canada, and received numerous accolades. The telemovie School's Out, which concluded the franchise, aired in 1992.

Schuyler and original Degrassi series head writer Yan Moore began developing a new television drama in 1999, following a reunion of the original Degrassi cast on the CBC series Jonovision. As the months progressed, they began to think about what had happened to the original characters to develop a school-reunion theme. However, they decided that a series would not work effectively if based around adults instead of children. Moore realized that the character Emma Nelson, born to character Christine "Spike" Nelson at the end of Degrassi Junior High's second season, would soon be entering junior high school, and development for the series took a new direction by focusing on Emma and her school experiences. Schuyler's husband Stephen Stohn suggested Degrassi: The Next Generation as the name for the new sequel series, which borrowed from Star Trek: The Next Generation.

=== Pitching ===
Schuyler pitched the new series to a number of television networks, with CTV and CBC (the franchise's former network) vying as the top contenders. CTV won through, offering $10 million for a fifteen-episode season. The project was greenlit in May 2000, with the originally planned reunion episode serving as the pilot to the new series. CTV announced the new series at its annual press conference in June 2001, and said the pilot would air in the fall. Soon after, Degrassi crew members attended a conference in New York to find an American partner for the show.

On one panel was Meeri Park Cunniff, from the newly formed Noggin channel at Viacom. Noggin had a double mandate: preschool programming in the morning and adolescent programming in the afternoon. At the panel, an audience member asked Meeri what sort of programming she would be considering for the new adolescent schedule. Without missing a beat, Meeri said, 'A few years back, there was a great series on PBS called Degrassi. That's exactly the kind of show we are looking for.'

— Linda Schuyler

In her memoir, Linda Schuyler explained how the conference went. An American channel called Noggin "had a double mandate: preschool programming in the morning and adolescent programming in the afternoon." Noggin was looking for educational teen shows for the adolescent schedule, and its employees mentioned the original Degrassi as "exactly the kind of show we are looking for." To their surprise, Degrassi distributor Ken Faier was at the conference and responded, "Do I have the show for you: it's called Degrassi." Noggin quickly signed on as the show's American distributor.

In October 2001, the first episode aired on CTV in Canada, and the magazine Kidscreen confirmed that the show was "set to air in Q1 2002 on Noggin in the U.S." In a press release titled "Noggin Tackles Tween Issues with Degrassi: The Next Generation," Noggin announced that the series would premiere on April 1, 2002, as part of its new teen block called The N (standing for Noggin).

=== Executive producers, script-writers and directors ===
Produced by Epitome Pictures Inc, in association with CTVglobemedia, Degrassi: The Next Generation received funding from the Canadian Television Fund, BCE, the Shaw Rocket Fund, Mountain Cable Program and the Royal Bank of Canada, the Bell Broadcast and New Media Fund, and the Cogeco Program Development Fund.

Linda Schuyler and Stephen Stohn served as executive producers throughout its run. Other Epitome Pictures employees and series crew members were also credited as executive producers, including Sara Snow, Brendon Yorke, James Hurst, Aaron Martin, and Sarah Glinski.

Story editors included Sarah Glinski and Matt Huether, Shelley Scarrow, James Hurst, Aaron Martin, and Sean Reycraft. Frequent directors included Phil Earnshaw, Stefan Scaini and Bruce McDonald. When production of season three began, a user on the official Degrassi: The Next Generation website with the alias "ExecProducer" began a forum thread titled "Shooting Season 3", revealing production details, guest actors, scheduling information and DVD release details. He referred to himself as "Stephen Stohn" in one post, although it was not until the release of Degrassi: Generations – The Official 411 in 2005, that Stohn confirmed he was the poster and it was not an imposter.

=== Episode format ===
The episodes are written following the same formula with two or three storylines (Plot A, Plot B and Plot C). The main storyline, A, opened and closed the episode, and was usually driven by a single character. Plot B was usually more comedic in tone and sometimes slightly intertwined with the other stories, often moving story arcs forward. Plot C was usually used sporadically in a season-long arc, but would eventually settle as comedic relief. The problems presented in the episode were not always resolved by the end of the episode, and were carried over to the next, or created a mini-arc over several episodes. The majority of the episodes were named after songs from the 1980s, and since the tenth season, the episodes were named after songs from the 1990s to the present, which represented the entering of a new decade and a completely different cast from the earlier seasons. For the first nine seasons, Degrassi: The Next Generation had been produced as a weekly half-hour teen comedy-drama series, with each season consisting of between fifteen and twenty-four episodes.

Due to falling viewing figures between seasons six and nine, the series developed a daily soap opera format for the summer run of the tenth season, and increased the number of episodes to forty-four. The tenth season also dropped the tagline "The Next Generation", with only one original cast member remaining, and due to the young audience unfamiliar with the past generation, referring to the series as "Degrassi". Season 13 reverted to airing episodes weekly, but still produced more episodes than prior to the soap opera format, airing a block in the summer of 2013 to the summer of 2014.

=== Opening sequence ===
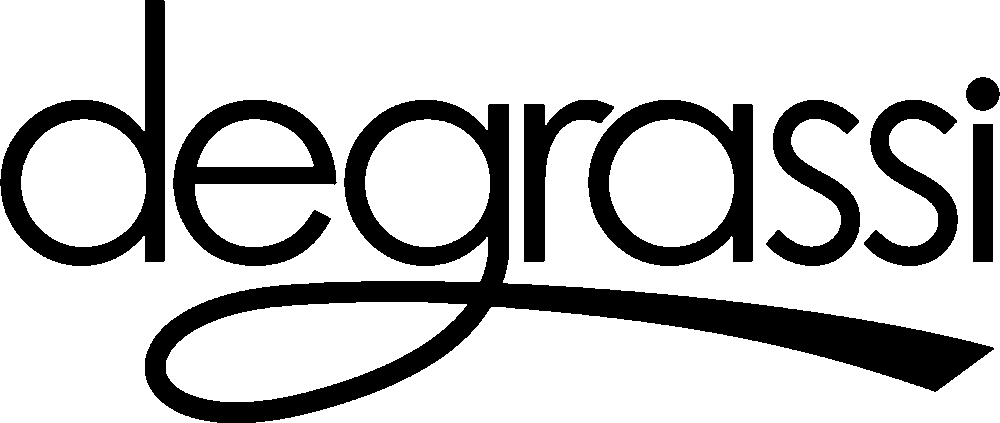
Logo used in seasons 13–14

The opening sequence followed a two- to three-minute cold open. During the first five seasons these credits showed the characters on the school premises and followed a mini storyline. Seasons six and seven featured titles with the actors breaking the fourth wall and facing the camera, over a montage of character videos from past seasons, saturated with blue colour and gold outlines. The montages behind the characters depicting a major event in that character's storyline. For the eighth season, the show abandoned the style of titles used for the previous two seasons and returned to the original form of showing the characters at school while participating in school-related activities. Season thirteen dropped the opening credits, replacing it with an eleven-second montage. This continued into season fourteen. Instead of listing every ensemble actor, after the montage, season thirteen and fourteen episodes credit only the regular actors appearing in that episode.

The theme music, "Whatever It Takes", was composed by Jim McGrath, with lyrics written by Jody Colero and Stephen Stohn. The song include lines such as, "Whatever it takes, I know I can make it through/Be the best, the best I can be", to convey what Colero calls, "a sense of joy and optimism." Lisa Dalbello performed the lyrics with a children's choir over a 1980s pop music style tune during the first three seasons. Dave Ogilvie and Anthony Valcic of Canadian industrial-pop group Jakalope reworked and performed the song with a heavier sound to reflect the growing maturity of the characters in season four. For seasons six and seven, the theme—still performed by Jakalope—was remixed and stripped of vocals. A fourth version of the theme song, with lyrics sung by Jeen O'Brien, was introduced for the eighth season, and a fifth version of the theme, performed by the in-show band "Stüdz" was used for the ninth and tenth seasons. For seasons eleven and twelve, a sixth version of the theme song was used, performed by Alexz Johnson. Seasons thirteen and fourteen featured a truncated version of the Alexz Johnson theme.

=== Music ===
Jim McGrath created the musical score for each episode using an instrumental version of the theme music. He also worked with actors such as Jake Epstein, Melissa McIntyre and Jamie Johnston, when writing music for their characters Craig Manning, Ashley Kerwin, and Peter Stone to perform in the bands Downtown Sasquatch, Paige Michalchuk and the Sexkittens (PMS), Hell Hath No Fury, and Stüdz. In addition to being scored, Degrassi featured a mix of original emo, alternative rock and pop music. Popular songs were used sparingly in the series, mainly because of budget constraints. Usually, music supervisor Jody Colero selected songs from little-known, unsigned Canadian artists. When these songs were included, they originated from a diegetic source. Examples of this could be seen in the first-season episode "Jagged Little Pill", when well-known songs were played during Ashley's house party, at the wedding reception in the fifth-season episode "Weddings, Parties, Anything", and during the party scene in the seventh-season episode "Everything She Wants".

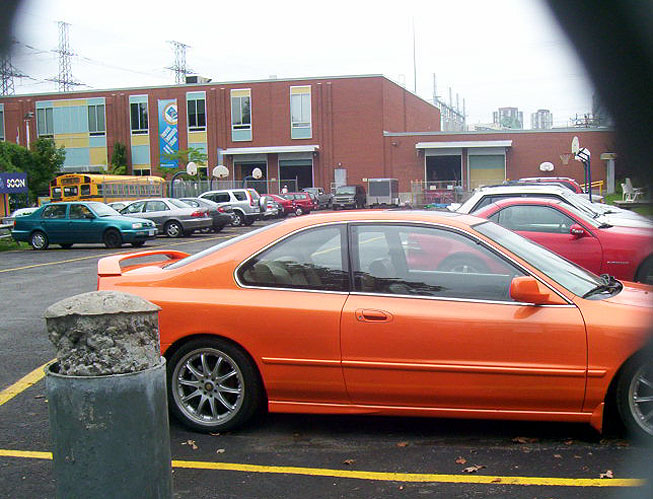
The Epitome Pictures studio where Degrassi: The Next Generation was filmed, pictured in August 2004.

=== Filming locations ===
The Degrassi universe was set on De Grassi Street in Toronto, Ontario. The three previous series were filmed on and near the street. However, The Next Generation was filmed at Epitome Pictures' four soundstages and backlot located at the company's 100,000-square-foot (9,300 m^{2}) production studios in Toronto. The facade of Degrassi Community School was the exterior of Studio C, and used the same colours and glass pattern as Centennial College, which was used to depict the school in Degrassi High. The area in front of this facade featured a "hoarding area" where students gathered, and a street and a bus stop across the road. The studio's backlot was used for exterior shots of the characters' houses, where each unit was dressed differently for each house, and The Dot Grill. The building for The Dot was the only one on the backlot that was large enough to allow filming inside, while scenes that took place inside the school and house interiors were filmed on one of four sound stages.

Studio A contained sets for the school's hallways, washrooms, cafeteria and classrooms. The hallways were stenciled with phrases such as "the perfect human being is all human", which were found at the Etobicoke School for the Arts, one of the many schools that set designers used during their original research. The washroom set had graffiti on the walls to look authentic, and the urinals are installed and removed as needed. The set used for the cafeteria was designed to be "purposefully bland to take the edge off the rest of the school looking so beautiful." It was also used as the studio's cafeteria where the cast and crew eat.

In addition to being used as the exterior of the school, Studio C held sets for the school's entrance foyer, the gymnasium, the media lab and a hallway with lockers. As the series progressed and the budget increased, a stairway and balcony were installed in the foyer in an attempt to get characters off the floor and not all appear in the same geometric plane. For the first few seasons, the gym floor was made of real wooden floorboards; due to warping, it was replaced by concrete painted to look like wood.

Studio B contained the sets for the characters' houses and The Core newspaper office which was introduced in season six. The fourth studio, Studio D, housed all of the production offices, dressing rooms, and make-up and hair departments. The pool hall and university campus club sets were built in Studio D for the seventh season.

York University's Keele Campus in Toronto served as the location for various sites at Smithdale University.

== Episodes ==
Season	Episodes		Originally released		
Season	Episodes		First released	Last released	Network
1	15		October 14, 2001	March 3, 2002	CTV
2	22		September 29, 2002	February 23, 2003	CTV
3	22		September 17, 2003	April 5, 2004	CTV
4	22		September 7, 2004	February 14, 2005	CTV
5	19		September 19, 2005	March 20, 2006	CTV
6	19		September 29, 2006	May 14, 2007	CTV
7	24		October 5, 2007	June 23, 2008	CTV
8	22		October 5, 2008	August 14, 2009	CTV
9	23	14	October 4, 2009	November 22, 2009	CTV
9	23	9	May 10, 2010	July 16, 2010	MuchMusic
10	44		July 19, 2010	April 22, 2011	MuchMusic
11	45		July 18, 2011	May 18, 2012	MuchMusic
12	40		July 16, 2012	June 21, 2013	MuchMusic
13	40	8	July 11, 2013	August 22, 2013	MuchMusic
13	40	32	October 2, 2013	July 29, 2014	MTV Canada
14	28		October 28, 2014	August 2, 2015	MTV Canada

== Cast ==
=== Main ===
For the new generation of students, producers auditioned over six hundred school-aged children in an attempt to provide characters to which the teenaged target-audience could relate. The decision to cast age-similar actors was purposeful to contrast the series from other shows of the same period such as Buffy the Vampire Slayer and Dawson's Creek, which had cast actors in their twenties as teenagers.

Eleven children were given star billing in the first season. Sarah Barrable-Tishauer portrayed the lonely high-achiever Liberty Van Zandt. Daniel Clark played bad-boy Sean Cameron. Lauren Collins was cast as Paige Michalchuk, the school's head cheerleader and queen bee. Ryan Cooley portrayed class clown James Tiberius "J.T." Yorke, with Jake Goldsbie cast as J.T.'s best friend, Toby Isaacs, a computer geek. Aubrey Graham portrayed basketball star Jimmy Brooks, who came from a wealthy family. Shane Kippel played school bully Gavin "Spinner" Mason. Miriam McDonald was cast as Emma Nelson, an environmental rights activist, with Cassie Steele cast in the role of Emma's best friend, high school cheerleader Manuela "Manny" Santos. Melissa McIntyre portrayed Ashley Kerwin, the perfect girl who attracted the popular boys, and who the other girls are jealous of. Christina Schmidt portrayed the overweight and insecure Terri McGreggor.

Providing ties to the previous series in the Degrassi universe, Stefan Brogren was approached to play his old character Archie "Snake" Simpson, now working at the school as the media immersion teacher. Dan Woods reprised his role as English teacher Mr. Raditch, who was promoted to school principal, and Pat Mastroianni returned to his role as Joey Jeremiah. Amanda Stepto also returned to the franchise to play her character Christine "Spike" Nelson as a recurring role.

In the pilot episode, former Degrassi Junior High and Degrassi High actors Danah Jean Brown (Trish Skye), Darrin Brown (Dwayne Myers), Michael Carry (Simon Dexter), Irene Courakos (Alexa Pappadopoulos), Chrissa Erodotou (Diana Economopoulos), Anais Granofsky (Lucy Fernandez), Rebecca Haines (Kathleen Mead), Sarah Holmes (Alison Hunter), Neil Hope (Derek "Wheels" Wheeler), Kyra Levy (Maya Goldberg), Cathy Keenan (Liz O'Rourke), Stacie Mistysyn (Caitlin Ryan), and Siluck Saysanasy (Yick Yu) reprised their roles for the class reunion storyline.

In season two, Mastroianni returned to the Degrassi franchise in a starring role as Joey Jeremiah, a car salesman and single father of two children. Joey's stepson, musician Craig Manning, played by Jake Epstein, was a new student at Degrassi Community School. Three other new characters were introduced in season two in recurring roles. Stacey Farber played Ellie Nash, a goth whose home life was in turmoil, and Adamo Ruggiero portrayed Marco Del Rossi, who was struggling to accept the reality that he is gay. Melissa Di Marco was cast as science and gym teacher Daphne Hatzilakos. Mistysyn also returned to her former Degrassi role as Joey's ex-high school sweetheart, Caitlyn Ryan, who in the years following graduation had become a world-renowned journalist.

In season three, Farber, Ruggiero and Mistysyn were given regular roles, as were Andrea Lewis (Hazel Aden) and Stepto, who had held recurring roles since the first season. Mike Lobel (Jay Hogart), Deanna Casaluce (Alex Nuñez), Ephraim Ellis (Rick Murray) and John Bregar (Dylan Michalchuk) were introduced in recurring roles as new students. Towards the end of the season, Schmidt's character, Terri McGreggor, was written out of the show when her possessive boyfriend Rick pushed her to the ground and knocked her head against a rock, causing her to fall into a coma.

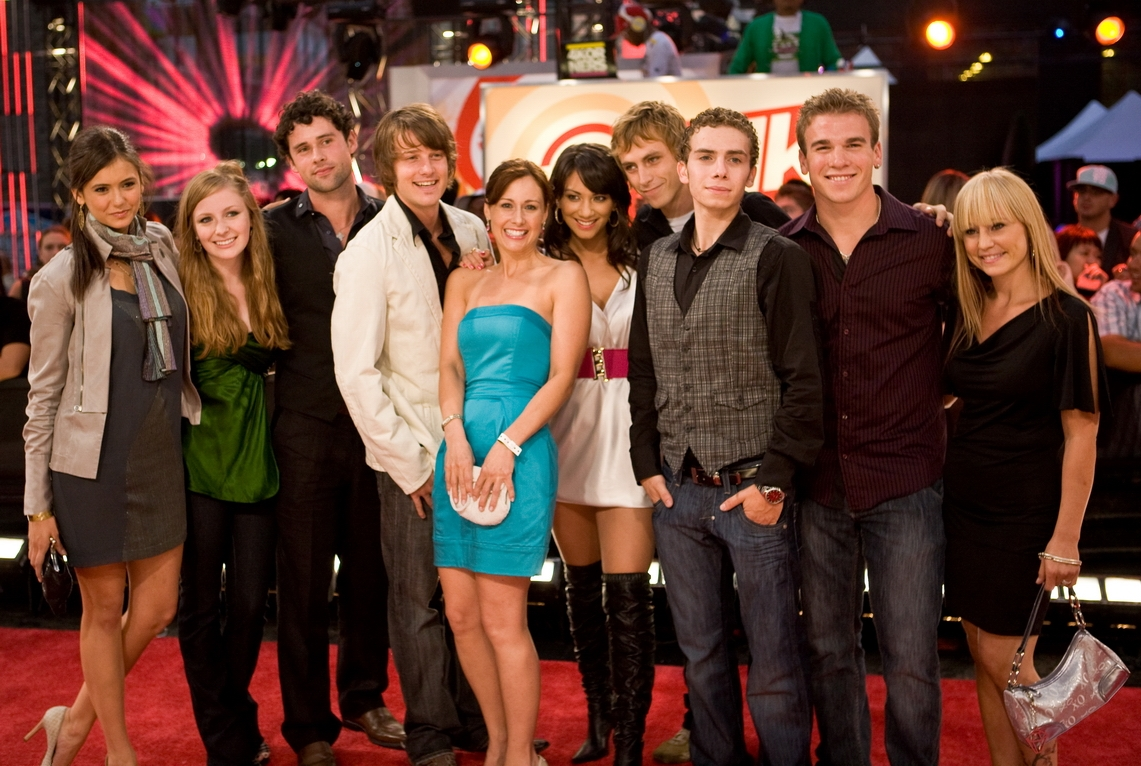
Some of the cast of season eight make an appearance at the eTalk Festival Party during the Toronto International Film Festival

Over the course of the ten seasons of Degrassi: The Next Generation, there have been several departures from the series. Season six depicted the first death of one of the show's main characters when J.T. Yorke was stabbed and killed. Clark's character Sean Cameron has been written out of the show twice. He left the series during the fourth season in the wake of the death of Rick Murray, and returned for the sixth season, but departed the series again at the end of the season. At the end of season five several main characters graduated from Degrassi Community School, and either left the series or went on to university. Six new characters were introduced in season seven in a storyline where nearby rival high school Lakehurst merged with Degrassi following a fire.

Season eight saw many changes when many of the existing cast members, including Collins, Farber, Graham, Stepto, Ruggiero, and DiMarco either moved to recurring status or left the series entirely. The exodus of several major cast members was reportedly an executive decision that left the actors and producers on bad terms, with Graham stating in an interview with Vibe that "[the producers] did us foul." Thirteen actors were added to the main cast to replace them. By season nine, Brogren, McDonald, Steele and Kippel were the only actors from season one who remained in the series as storylines began to focus on a new generation of children attending the school. This was done to avoid moving the show to a primarily college setting, as the first generation cast aged or "graduated" out of Degrassi Community School into college.

As of season 10, none of the characters from the earlier seasons remained, with the exception of Brogren, whose character was promoted to the principal of Degrassi Community School.

=== Guest roles ===
Besides Brogren, Mistysyn, Stepto, and Mastroianni having starring roles, other actors from Degrassi Junior High and Degrassi High had returned to guest star in their old roles throughout Degrassi: The Next Generation's run. As well as the pilot episode featuring the return of many Degrassi alumni, Granofsky made a second guest appearance during the second season in the episode "White Wedding" when her character attended the wedding of Spike and Snake. Neil Hope, who portrayed Wheels in the original series, returned for a brief cameo in a third-season episode centered around Snake's battle with leukemia. In a fifth-season episode, Keenan guest starred when her character returned to console Spike after her marriage with Snake broke down.

Movie director Kevin Smith and actor Jason Mewes guest starred as themselves in the final three episodes of the fourth season. The plot for these episodes involved the pair working on Jay and Silent Bob Go Canadian, Eh!, a fictional feature film in the View Askewniverse, using Degrassi Community School as a filming location. Singer Alanis Morissette, who had worked with Smith, also guest stars in "Going Down the Road Part One" as herself, acted as the school principal in Smith's film. Smith and Mewes also return to Degrassi: The Next Generation as themselves for two episodes in season five. The storyline in the episodes was of the premiere of Jay and Silent Bob Go Canadian, Eh! Smith and Mewes guest starred a third time for four episodes in season eight when many of the characters travelled to Hollywood, Los Angeles. In the episodes, Mewes was the writer-director and protagonist of Mewesical High, which starred a number of Degrassi Community School students. Smith appeared in the episodes to support Mewes as he makes his directorial debut.

Other guest actors who appeared in Degrassi: The Next Generation included Jayne Eastwood as Sean Cameron's mother, Billy Ray Cyrus as Duke, a limousine driver who got arrested, which resulted Jimmy, Hazel, Paige, and Spinner being left stranded in the street. Season seven featured appearances from Shirley Douglas as a university professor, Free The Children founder Craig Kielburger, and English pop singer Natasha Bedingfield as themselves. Jonathan Torrens guest starred as Emma's father, Shane, in the two-part season three premiere. The character had been played by Bill Parrott in the original series, but he decided not to return the former role. In season 10, ballroom dancer Jean-Marc Généreux appeared as a teacher during the episode "My Body Is a Cage". After the series had moved to MuchMusic cameos became more frequent; Keke Palmer, Ben Mulroney, Chaz Bono, Hedley, and Fefe Dobson also made appearances in the show.

== Broadcast and distribution ==
=== First-run broadcast ===
While Degrassi originally aired in Canada on CBC, Degrassi: The Next Generation was broadcast on Bell Media-owned stations. Until mid-season 9, it aired on CTV. It moved to sister network MuchMusic in 2010. In 2013, following a revamp of MuchMusic's schedule, the show moved to MTV in Canada. It currently airs on ABC Spark, Disney Channel, CMT and YTV as of 2020.

In the United States, it aired on Noggin's programming block for teenagers, The N. By 2003, it had become the highest-rated show on the block. An episode that aired July 2, 2004 was watched by a record 300,000 people, and Nielsen Media Research called it "the No. 1 program for Noggin viewers 12 to 17." Seasons 6 and 7 premiered on The N before they aired on CTV. During mid-season 9, the show was carried over to TeenNick, a channel that merged the programming of two Viacom-owned teen blocks (Noggin's The N and Nickelodeon's TEENick).

Before season 10, CTV executives told the production crew that they were cancelling the show due to a decline in viewing figures since season 7. The co-creator Linda Schuyler and executive producer Stephen Stohn were unsure of the fate of the show after this meeting. At the same time, Stohn had recently been in talks with his American partners at Viacom about creating a brand-new telenovela-style show for the TeenNick channel. Instead of making a new show, he pitched a revamp of Degrassi with a telenovela format. Combined with marketing efforts and support from Viacom, the show avoided cancellation. During this time, the show was rebranded as Degrassi.

The show's cancellation was announced in June 2015. That same month, on June 9, Epitome Pictures announced that a sequel series, Degrassi: Next Class, would premiere on Family Channel, owned by DHX Media, and streamed outside of Canada on Netflix. Episodes became available on Netflix in Canada following the conclusion of the first season.

=== Post-broadcast distribution ===
In Canada, stripped reruns of Degrassi: The Next Generation have aired on CTV Two and MTV2, which are owned by Bell Media. In the United States, independent distributor Program Partners and Sony Pictures Television, announced on September 24, 2006, that they acquired the syndication rights to the first 119 episodes of the show in the United States, and any subsequent new episodes.

In December 2006, Sony Pictures Television and Program Partners had reached agreements with the Tribune Company for every station it owned, The CW Plus affiliated stations, and many other stations owned by major media conglomerates. Degrassi: The Next Generation was cleared in 60% of the country including all five of the top five media markets. By March 2007, Program Partners had cleared it in over 70% of the country after stations owned by Hearst-Argyle Television, Capitol Broadcasting Company, and ACME Communications purchased the syndication. The series met the US FCC's educational and informational guidelines towards children's programming.

In October 2019, as part of a content deal struck between Viacom and WildBrain, a channel dedicated to Degrassi was added to Pluto TV on channel 172 (now channel 144) of the free, advertiser-supported streaming service's entertainment tier, offering episodes of Degrassi, with a limited number of episodes—including those that consisted of portions of two-part episodes, such as "Bitter Sweet Symphony (Part 1)"—omitted from the episode rotation.

As of July 2021, reruns of Degrassi: The Next Generation continue to air on certain Canadian television networks owned by Corus Entertainment, including ABC Spark, CMT, and YTV.

=== DVD releases ===
The first twelve seasons of Degrassi: The Next Generation have been released on DVD. The box sets are released in Canada by Alliance Home Entertainment. In the United States, FUNimation Entertainment released the first six seasons and Echo Bridge Entertainment released seasons seven through twelve. Each season boxset includes extra features such as pictures, karaoke sessions, audition tapes, bloopers, deleted scenes and more. In Australia, seasons 1 to 4 were released by Umbrella Entertainment in 2010 and 2011. These DVDs are compatible with the region 4 code, which is in use in, Oceania and Latin America.

The three-episode story arc from the fourth season in which Kevin Smith and Jason Mewes guest star has also been released as a single disc Region 1 DVD. FUNimation Entertainment released the disc on November 8, 2005, in two versions: the first subtitled as "Uncut, Uncensored and Unrated", and the second, "Rated." Each release has the same DVD extras, including an interview with Kevin Smith, bloopers and a Jay and Silent Bob Photo Album. The Unrated release also features episode commentaries by Kevin Smith, Jason Mewes, Stacie Mistysyn, the associate producer Jim Jackman and writer Aaron Martin.

=== Streaming ===
Degrassi: The Next Generation has been made available over various streaming platforms over the years. During the show's original run, episodes were uploaded to CTV and The N's websites in Canada and the United States respectively. It was also made available on iTunes in North America. In 2007, Puretracks in Canada offered episodes for download as a media file that could be only burned or copied three times. In the US, Zune sold the full series. All 14 seasons were made available to stream on HBO Max on March 25, 2022. As of 2024, the majority of the series is free to watch on YouTube. For unknown reasons, some seasons may be missing one or more episodes.

Complete Season DVD Release
Release	Ep #	Release dates				Special Features
Release	Ep #	Region 1		Region 2	Region 4	Special Features
Release	Ep #	Canada	United States	Region 2	Region 4	Special Features
Season 1	15	October 19, 2004	September 28, 2004	—N/a	May 3, 2007	Degrassi Karaoke, Degrassi Photo Album, Character Descriptions, Cast Biographies, Deleted Scenes, Oops and Bloopers, Original Television Promos, and Audition Tapes.
Season 2	22	June 21, 2005		—N/a	September 8, 2010	130+ Deleted/Extended Scenes and Bloopers, Cast Audition Tapes, Season 2 Second Call Back Tapes, "Poor Thing" Karaoke, Interactive Fan Quiz, Degrassi Yearbook, Snake and Spike's Wedding Album, Student and Adult Profiles, and Cast Biographies.: Note: Region 4 DVD Release Only Has 72 Deleted Scenes
Season 3	22	March 28, 2006		—N/a	April 13, 2011	Audio Commentaries ("Accidents Will Happen" and "Pride"), Deleted Scenes, "Rock and Roll High School" Karaoke, Season 3 Interactive Quiz, CTV Degrassi Promo, Degrassi Yearbook, and Character and Cast Biographies.
Season 4	23	October 24, 2006	November 28, 2006	—N/a	April 13, 2011	Audio Commentaries ("Time Stands Still" and "Secret"), Deleted Scenes, Blooper Reel, Original Cast Auditions, Season 4 Interactive Quiz, Character and Cast Biographies, Jay and Silent Bob Flipbook, Degrassi Yearbook, and PAX Gun Violence Prevention Public Service Announcements.: Note: Audio Commentary on "Secret" is only available on the United States release.
Season 5	19	July 3, 2007		—N/a	—N/a	Deleted Scenes, Blooper Reel, Original Cast Auditions, Interview with Cassie Steele, Character and Cast Biographies, Degrassi Yearbook, Simple Plan Music Video and Interview, and Trailers.
Season 6	19	May 27, 2008		—N/a	—N/a	Deleted Scenes, Bloopers, Original Auditions, Character and Cast Biographies, Degrassi Yearbook, and Trailers.
Season 7	24	May 26, 2009	March 17, 2009	—N/a	—N/a	Bloopers, Deleted Scenes, Photo Gallery, Webisodes, and "On The Set".
Season 8	23	September 1, 2009		—N/a	—N/a	"Degrassi Goes Hollywood" The Movie, Bloopers, Deleted Scenes, Podcasts, Webisodes, "On The Set" Webisodes, and "My Window" Music Video.
Season 9	23	July 20, 2010		—N/a	—N/a	"Degrassi Takes Manhattan" The Movie, Bloopers, Deleted Scenes, Webisodes and Minis, and Music Videos.
Season 10	44	October 18, 2011	September 13, 2011	—N/a	—N/a	Episode Commentaries ("My Body Is A Cage" and "Umbrella"), Music Videos, Bloopers, and Webisodes.
Season 11	45	December 3, 2013		—N/a	—N/a	Meet the New Kids, The Gallery Shoot, Set Tour, Parking Lot Tour, From Rehearsal to Shooting, Goodbyes, Behind the Scenes, Deleted Scenes, Bloopers, and Webisodes.
Season 12	40	October 29, 2013		—N/a	—N/a	Back to Degrassi, New Kids on the Block, Shooting the Opening Sequence, 300th Episode Celebration, A Day with the Ice Hounds, Goodbye Uniforms, Inside Fiona's Birthday Brawl, Say Cheese: Photoshoot with Demetrius, Vanessa and Justice, The Making of Romeo & Jules, Bloopers, The Inside Look and The Table Read – Bitter Sweet Symphony, Graduation Day, Prom Night, The One and Only – Dylan Everett, Eli's Short Film – LIFE, Eli's Short Film – NYU Portfolio, Video Yearbook, and Episode Commentary.
Season 13	40	—N/a	—N/a	—N/a	—N/a	To Be Announced
Season 14	28	—N/a	—N/a	—N/a	—N/a	To Be Announced

== Impact and reception ==
=== Critical reception ===
Degrassi: The Next Generation has received generally positive reviews. Entertainment Weekly has called it "a cult hit", and The New York Times named it "Tha Best Teen TV N da WRLD (The best teen TV in the world)". Of the first season, The Ottawa Citizen's Tony Atherton had mixed feelings of the new incarnation, saying it "has a cleaner, more polished look, has lost its edge [and offers] nothing new to viewers familiar with the groundbreaking preceding series, nor to anyone else who has watched the deluge of teen dramas since ... there is a sense of déjà vu with regards to the plots and characters". He did, however, praise the show for having "the same simple narrative told from a kid's viewpoint, and the same regard for unvarnished reality [as Degrassi Junior High and Degrassi High]".

Before its debut in the United States, The Seattle Times' Melanie McFarland wondered whether the series would do well, writing: "soft-pedaling through the issues might work for today's family of viewers, but what's gentle enough for Mom and Dad's peace of mind might not be enough to hook Junior or the original Degrassi's older fans". The issues that the characters experience have often been commented on in the media. It has been noted that the series never attempts to hide from depicting honest accounts of the trials and tribulations that real teenagers may often experience. Sarah Liss from CBC News said that despite often being corny and soap opera-y, Degrassi: The Next Generation tackles issues that other genre series prefer to gloss over, and was part of her essential viewing. She named the series one of "the [ten] most important television shows of the 2000s", and was the only children's series, and the only Canadian television series, to appear on the list, which included Mad Men, Lost, the CSI franchise, and Sex and the City.

In 2008, Jeffrey Bento-Carrier described one storyline that showed a teacher being accused of sexually assaulting one of his students as "shock[ing]", adding that "Degrassi is not for everyone, mainly because it's an honest account what it's like to be a teen in a society which values cliques and confrontation over truth and real growth." Brian Orloff of the St. Petersburg Times echoed the sentiments, and praised the series for "stay[ing] in touch with teens' lives".

In spite of these comments, Noggin/The N held back a controversial episode from the first season, which showed a character losing control after taking an ecstasy pill. According to Stohn, "the people at Noggin felt there weren't enough repercussions to the drug use, so we re-edited it and added some dialogue to satisfy the network." The N also refused to broadcast two episodes from the second season that featured a storyline about date-rape until suitable edits could be made, and withheld other episodes from season three that showed a fourteen-year-old character having an abortion after having consensual sexual intercourse with her boyfriend, and feeling no regrets. The decision caused an uproar amongst fans who organized a petition that caught the attention of the New York Times, as well as CBC, the National Post and the London Free Press in Canada. The episodes eventually aired three years later as part of an "every episode ever" marathon, with very little advertisement from the network. Another storyline was featured in the media after ten children from a Québécois school were found to have a number of cuts on their bodies. They said they had copied the show when one character began self harming herself in an episode.

Comparisons between Degrassi: The Next Generation and other genre specific series have also been made throughout the run. Jake Surette, a writer with AfterElton.com, a website which focuses on the portrayal of homosexual and bisexual men in the media, reported on the portrayal of two Degrassi: The Next Generation gay characters. "Degrassi features ongoing stories of real-life teen dilemmas—including intense gay and lesbian storylines—and does it without the righteous, 'On a Very Special Blossom' endings that many teen dramas and sitcoms thrive on." Kevin Thompson of The Palm Beach Post said the series "is told from a teenager's point of view since the writers have no interest in appealing to a broad-based demographic like the writers on, say, Fox's The O.C. ... it connects with teens on their level". PopMatters's Jodie Janella Horn also compared it with The O.C., saying that while scenes from Degrassi could be "actual scenes from my actual teenage life ... The O.C. will never remind me of anything in my life", adding that it is the most unnervingly accurate series ever of the high school genre.

The San Jose Mercury News has said "If they [Everwood, The O.C., and One Tree Hill] want to be taken seriously, the shows could take a cue from Canadian drama Degrassi: The Next Generation, which ... addresses the same gritty teen issues without being far-fetched". The New York Times has also made favourable reviews of the series in comparison to Everwood, The O.C., and One Tree Hill, as well as Beverly Hills, 90210, Gilmore Girls, Dawson's Creek, and adult series such as Sex and the City, Maude, and Six Feet Under. AOL TV ranked it as the sixth TV's Biggest Guilty Pleasure.

=== Television ratings ===
With characters from Degrassi Junior High and Degrassi High appearing in Degrassi: The Next Generation, viewers of the earlier series who were in their 20s and 30s made up a dedicated fan base of the current incarnation. Approximately 40% of the series' viewers are outside of Degrassi: The Next Generation's 12- to 17-year-old target audience. Degrassi: The Next Generation averaged 365,000 viewers aged 12–20 years old in season one, and became the most watched domestic drama in Canada. By the end of season two, it had become the most popular Canadian show for the three youngest age groups (children aged 2–11, teenagers aged 12–17 and young adults aged 18–34).

In the third season, Degrassi: The Next Generation was again the most-watched all-Canadian drama series, and the most watched Canadian drama among adults 18–49. A season four episode that featured a school shooting received 930,000 viewers; at that time it was the programme's highest-ever rating. A second episode in the same season that featured a storyline about oral sex also earned just under 1,000,000 viewers. Overall, the season averaged 600,000 viewers, and was again the top Canadian drama for teens aged 12–17, and adults in three age brackets 18–34, 18–49 and 25–54. It averaged 250,000 viewers in the US in 2004 and was the highest rated digital cable series in the US in 2006. While that figure was still far lower than successful shows on the "big four" networks (ABC, CBS, Fox and NBC), the premiere episodes of earlier seasons had achieved higher audience numbers with females aged 12–34. 2004 also saw the school-shooting episode receive more than half a million US viewers. The fifth season drew in an average of 767,000 viewers, with episode two of the season was seen by 1,000,000 viewers.

Ratings began to decline halfway through the series' run. In Canada, season six was watched by fewer viewers than had watched season five; episode fourteen was the highest-viewed episode of the season, with a total of 645,000 viewers. The season finale was watched by 520,000 viewers, and the season overall averaged 522,000 viewers. The average viewing figures fell again during the seventh season. The season premiere achieved the highest figures with 585,000 viewers. This progressively dropped over the coming weeks, from 446,000 total viewers for the third episode, to 407,000 total viewers for the fifth episode, and continued to fall to a low of 314,000 viewers by the tenth episode. Overall, the first twelve episodes of the season averaged 455,000 viewers, 45,000 less than the same number of episodes from the season six.

Viewing figures continued to fall throughout season eight; Bill Brioux, the television columnist for The Canadian Press, was surprised that Degrassi: The Next Generation had even reached its eighth season with such poor ratings, asking "What other show in the history of Canadian or American television has so consistently drawn so few viewers yet gets renewed year after year?" The season premiere was watched by 398,000 viewers, almost 200,000 viewers fewer than what the premiere of season seven achieved. Viewing figures continued to drop when episodes two and six were both watched by an average of 220,000 viewers. At the time they were the lowest figures Degrassi: The Next Generation has ever received; however, they continued to fall and by episode eleven, overnight ratings indicated it had received 139,000 viewers.

The overall number of viewers rose slightly for the thirteenth episode, the first of a two-parter, when it was watched by 157,000 people, but the viewing figures for the key 18–34 demographics was at a low of 81,000. The following week, the episode that concluded the two-parter picked up viewers, reaching an estimated total of 206,000. Brioux commented again about Degrassi: The Next Generation still being on the schedules, wondering when CTV was going to announce its cancellation and noting that The Amazing Race, which follows it in the scheduling, was watched by ten times the number of Degrassi's viewers. That pattern was repeated the following week, when Degrassi: The Next Generation was watched by 222,000 viewers, compared to 1,834,000 viewers for The Amazing Race, 1,579,000 viewers for Desperate Housewives and 1,106,000 viewers for The Mentalist, which were broadcast by CTV later in the evening.

CTV aired two episodes back-to-back in the first half of season nine, and the scheduling had improved ratings. The first two episodes earned a combined figure of 471,000 viewers, and the third and fourth episodes retained them; they were watched by a combined 475,000 viewers. The following week, the total viewing figures for episodes five and six had increased to 608,000, and remained high as the season went into hiatus in November with 572,000 total viewers.

=== Awards ===
Degrassi: The Next Generation has received numerous awards and nominations. The Writers Guild of Canada awarded its Canadian Screenwriting Awards to the writers of two episodes. In 2004, Aaron Martin, James Hurst and Shelley Scarrow won the "Best Youth Script Award" for "Pride". The following year, the Scarrow-penned episode "Secret" vied with "Mercy Street", written by James Hurst and Miklos Perlus for the "Best Youth Script Award". "Mercy Street" won. The series has been nominated for fourteen Directors Guild of Canada Awards. In the "Outstanding Achievement in a Television Series – Children's" group category, the Bruce McDonald helmed "Mother and Child Reunion" (nominated 2002) and "When Doves Cry" (nominated 2003) were winners.

"White Wedding", also directed by McDonald, won the award in 2003 for "Outstanding Achievement in Direction – Television Series". McDonald's "Holiday" (nominated 2004), and Stefan Scaini's "Time Stands Still, part 2" (nominated 2005) won the group categories for "Outstanding Achievement in a Television Series – Family". "Can't Hardly Wait" and "Pass the Dutchie" were also nominated in that category in 2007 and 2008, respectively, but failed to win the awards. Stephen Withrow picked up two awards in the "Outstanding Achievement in Picture Editing" category, for "Mother and Child Reunion" in 2002 and "When Doves Cry" in 2003. Degrassi: The Next Generation had won seventeen Gemini Awards since 2002, and had been nominated in twenty-six other categories. In 2010, producer Linda Schuyler received the Academy Achievement Award.

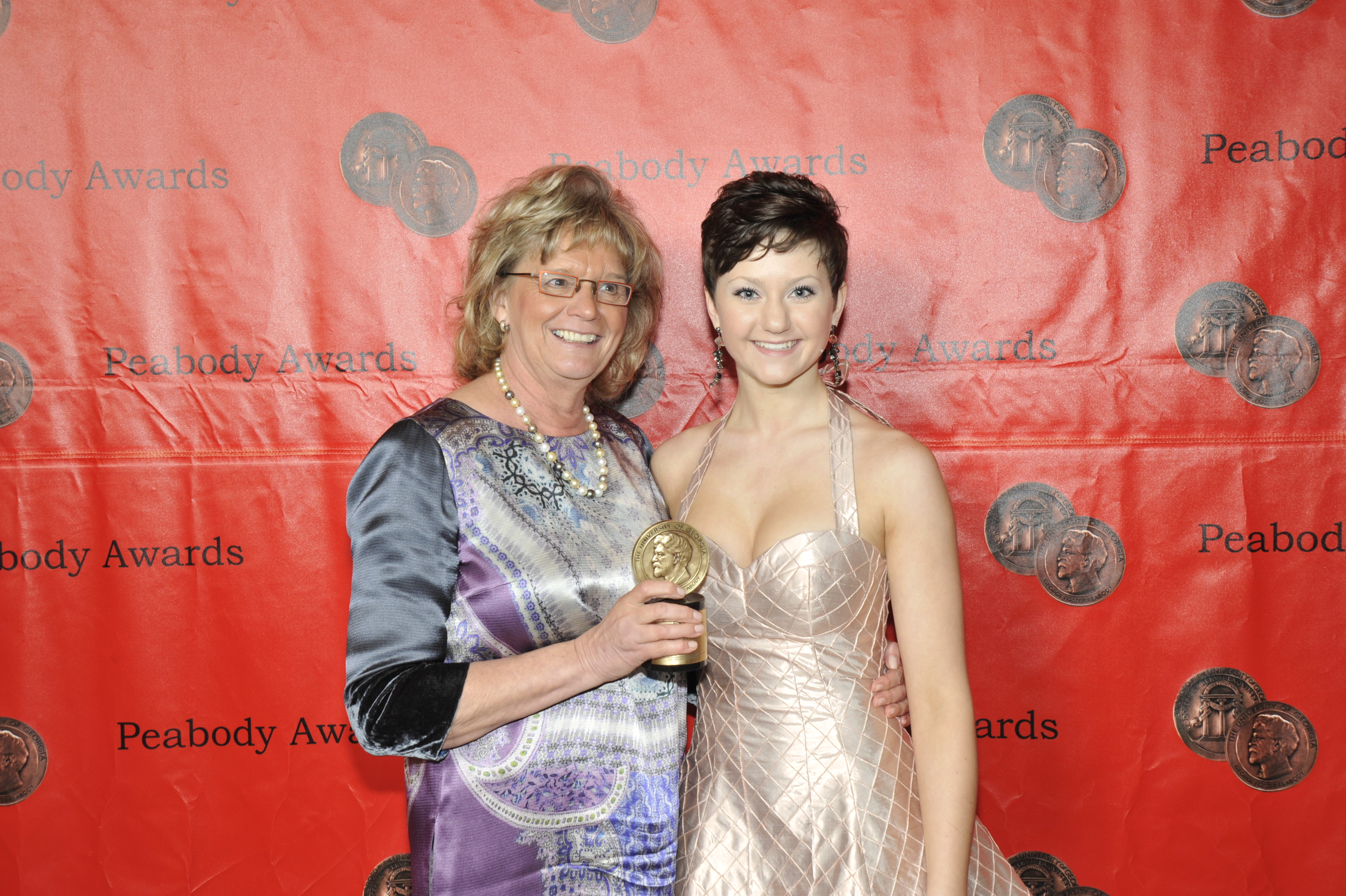
Linda Schuyler and Jordan Todosey holding award at the 70th Annual Peabody Awards

Degrassi: The Next Generation had also seen awards success internationally. It was nominated for a "Best Children's Television Programme" Prix Jeunesse in Germany in 2004, and has been nominated at the GLAAD Media Awards four times. In 2004, the show received a nomination in the Outstanding Drama Series category, but lost to the sports drama Playmakers. It was nominated in the same category again in 2008, but lost to Brothers & Sisters. In 2005, Degrassi: The Next Generation won the Television Critics Association Award for "Outstanding Achievement in Children's Programming." It was only the second time that a non-United States series has won an award in this category (the first time was Degrassi Junior High in 1988).

The Young Artist Awards had been recognising actors in the Degrassi franchise since 1987. Degrassi: The Next Generation was nominated for four awards in its first year. Ryan Cooley and Jake Goldsbie were nominated in the "Best Leading Young Actor Performance in a TV Comedy Series" category, but lost to Frankie Muniz from Malcolm in the Middle. The series won the award for "Best Ensemble in a Comedy or Drama TV Series" category. A year later, Jake Epstein won the Young Artist Award in the category for "Best Leading Young Actor Performance in a TV Comedy Series". In 2005, Christina Schmidt tied with Alia Shawkat of Arrested Development to win the award for "Best Supporting Young Actress Performance in a TV Comedy Series", and Jamie Johnston won the 2008 category for "Best Leading Young Actor Performance in a TV Series". Young Artist Awards were awarded again in 2012, with both Cristine Prosperi and A.J. Saudin winning awards in the Lead Young Actress and Recurring Young Actor categories respectively. However, they both tied with another in their category.

At the Teen Choice Awards, children aged between twelve and nineteen vote for each category's winner. The series was nominated three times in the "Choice Summer TV Show" category, and won twice, in 2005 and 2007. The episode "My Body Is a Cage", where Adam was outed as transgender, earned a Peabody Award, and a Creative Arts Emmy Award nomination in 2011.

=== Legacy ===
In 2025, several cast members from Degrassi: The Next Generation appeared in Lisa Rideout’s documentary Degrassi: Whatever It Takes. The documentary examines the history and cultural legacy of the wider Degrassi franchise and premiered at the 2025 Toronto International Film Festival.
