= Degrassi: The Next Generation season 8 =

Degrassi: The Next Generation
- Season 8
- Degrassi: The Next Generation Season 8 DVD
- Showrunner: Sara Snow
- No. of episodes: 22

Release
- Original network: CTV (Canada); The N (United States)
- Original release: October 5, 2008 – August 30, 2009

Season chronology
- ← Previous; Season 7 Next → Season 9

The eighth season of Degrassi: The Next Generation premiered in Canada on October 5, 2008, concluded on August 30, 2009, and consists of twenty-two episodes (18 episodes, and 1 movie). Degrassi: The Next Generation is a Canadian serial teen drama television series. Although only one school year passed in the story timeline since season six, season eight is set in the fall semester of the year in which it aired. Writers have been able to use a semi-floating timeline, so that the issues depicted are modern for their viewers. This season depicts the lives of a group of high school freshmen, juniors, seniors, and graduates as they deal with some of the challenges and issues young adults face such as sex, sexism, sexual identity, financial difficulties, drug use, mental disorders, cyberbullying, child molestation, stress, hostage situations, racism, and psychological abuse. Thirteen actors are added to the ensemble cast, while fourteen cast members have either left the series or been dropped from the main cast to recurring roles. The season focuses heavily on the new generation of students at Degrassi Community School, although it included storylines about those who have graduated and gone on to university.

Season eight aired Sundays at 7:30 p.m. on CTV, a Canadian television network. Episodes were repeated on CTV's sister cable speciality network, MuchMusic, on Tuesdays at 7:00 p.m. In the United States, the season began on October 10, 2008 on The N, a cable channel spun off from Noggin's teen programming block of the same name. Unlike seasons six and seven, which premiered in the US, this season's premiere episode was broadcast in Canada first, with the second episode airing a week later; in the US, however, both episodes aired together as an hour-long special. As well as airing on television, the season's episodes were also streamed on the websites of CTV and The N, as well as iTunes.

Production for the season began in May 2008 at Epitome Pictures' studios in Toronto, Ontario, and were completed in late October 2008. The final episodes of the season were filmed in part in Hollywood, Los Angeles, California, Beverly Hills, Venice Beach and Malibu and were written and directed by Stefan Brogren, who plays Archie "Snake" Simpson.

This is also the final season to feature (Drake) playing Jimmy Brooks, due to him wanting to focus on his music career.

== Cast ==
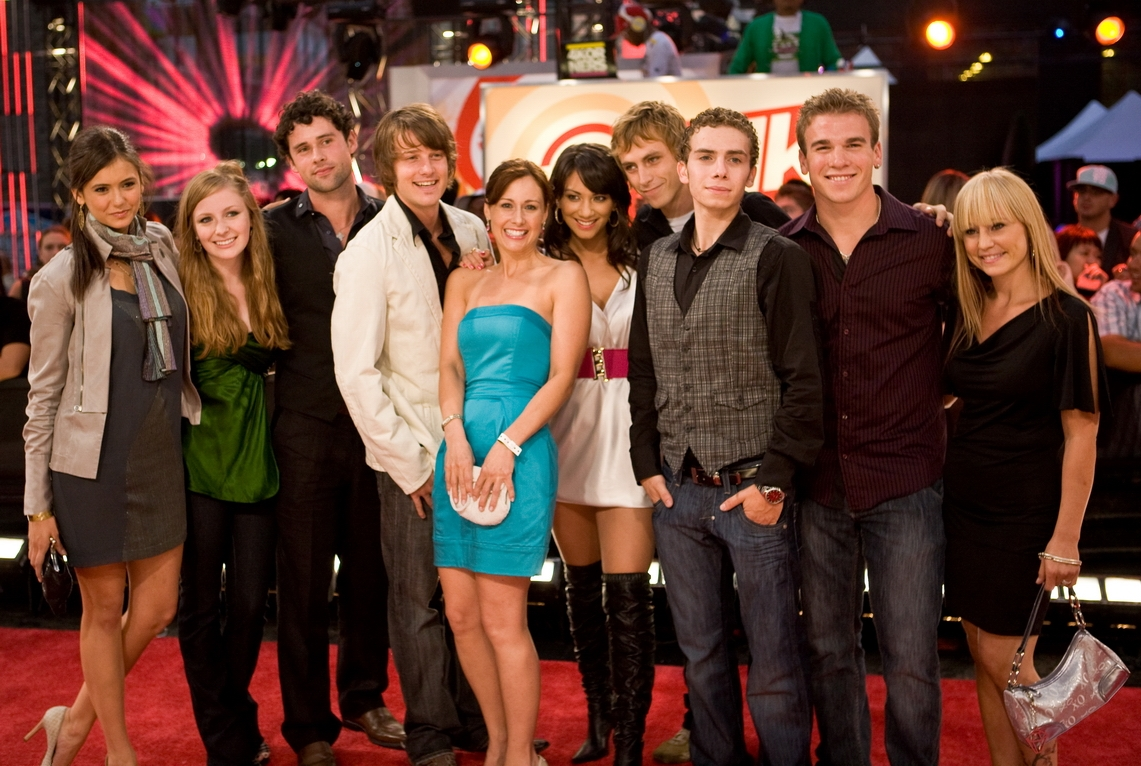
Some of the cast of Degrassi: The Next Generation at the eTalk Festival Party, during the Toronto International Film Festival

The eighth season features twenty-four actors who receive star billing, with eleven of them returning from the previous season. Joining the main cast are Evan Williams (Kelly), Judy Jiao (Leia), Jajube Mandiela (Chantay), Samantha Munro (Anya), A.J. Saudin (Connor), Sam Earle (K.C.), Aislinn Paul (Clare), Melinda Shankar (Alli), Raymond Ablack (Sav), Natty Zavitz (Bruce the Moose), Scott Paterson (Johnny), Jordan Hudyma (Blue) and Argiris Karras (Riley), replacing Aubrey Graham (Jimmy), Stacey Farber (Ellie), Lauren Collins (Paige), Shenae Grimes (Darcy), Mike Lobel (Jay), Mazin Elsadig (Damian), Amanda Stepto (Spike), Melissa DiMarco (Hatzilakos) and Adamo Ruggiero (Marco).

=== Main cast ===
- Jamie Johnston as Peter Stone (18 episodes)
- Sarah Barrable-Tishauer as Liberty Van Zandt (6 episodes)
- Miriam McDonald as Emma Nelson (10 episodes)
- Cassie Steele as Manuela "Manny" Santos (10 episodes)
- Evan Williams as Kelly Ashoona (10 episodes)
- Judy Jiao as Leia Chang (8 episodes)
- Marc Donato as Derek Haig (10 episodes)
- Jajube Mandiela as Chantay Black (12 episodes)
- Samantha Munro as Anya MacPherson (17 episodes)
- A.J. Saudin as Connor DeLaurier (10 episodes)
- Sam Earle as K.C. Guthrie (9 episodes)
- Aislinn Paul as Clare Edwards (12 episodes)
- Melinda Shankar as Alli Bhandari (15 episodes)
- Dalmar Abuzeid as Danny Van Zandt (20 episodes)
- Raymond Ablack as Savtaj "Sav" Bhandari (19 episodes)
- Shane Kippel as Gavin "Spinner" Mason (13 episodes)
- Nina Dobrev as Mia Jones (19 episodes)
- Charlotte Arnold as Holly J. Sinclair (16 episodes)
- Natty Zavitz as Bruce the Moose (12 episodes)
- Scott Paterson as Johnny DiMarco (7 episodes)
- Stefan Brogren as Archie "Snake" Simpson (11 episodes)
- Jordan Hudyma as Blue Chessex (6 episodes)
- Argiris Karras as Riley Stavros (8 episodes)
- Paula Brancati as Jane Vaughn (10 episodes)

==== Degrassi Goes Hollywood ====
The following are credited with the main cast in the special's original two-hour broadcast:

- Lauren Collins as Paige Michalchuk (4 episodes)
- Jake Epstein as Craig Manning (3 episodes)
- Stacey Farber as Ellie Nash (4 episodes)
- Mike Lobel as Jay Hogart (8 episodes)
- Adamo Ruggiero as Marco Del Rossi (4 episodes)

=== Recurring cast ===
Former series regulars who appear this season in recurring or guest roles include:

- Shenae Grimes as Darcy Edwards (3 episodes)
- Amanda Stepto as Christine "Spike" Nelson (2 episodes)
- Melissa DiMarco as Daphne Hatzilakos (1 episode)
- Aubrey Graham as Jimmy Brooks (1 episode)
- Jake Goldsbie as Toby Isaacs (1 episode)

Kevin Jubinville appears in a recurring role as Principal "Shep" Shepard. Jason Mewes and Kevin Smith return as themselves in the special Degrassi Goes Hollywood, along with other celebrity cameos from Kelly Carlson, Vivica A. Fox, Pete Wentz, Cassadee Pope, Tim Rozon and Perez Hilton.

== Crew ==
Season eight was produced by Epitome Pictures in association with CTV. Funding was provided by The Canadian Film or Video Production Tax Credit and the Ontario Film and Television Tax Credit, the Canadian Television Fund and BCE-CTV Benefits, The Shaw Television Broadcast Fund, the Independent Production Fund, Mountain Cable Program, and RBC Royal Bank.

Linda Schuyler, co-creator of the Degrassi franchise and CEO of Epitome Pictures, served as an executive producer with her husband, and President of Epitome Pictures, Stephen Stohn. Sara Snow is also credited as an executive producer. David Lowe was the producer, and Stephanie Cohen the supervising producer. As well as playing Snake Simpson, Stephen Brogren also served as the creative producer, and, for the first time, directed episodes, after previously writing, producing, and directing the exclusive online series Degrassi Minis. The casting director was Stephanie Gorin, and the editor was D. Gillian Truster.

The executive story editor was Sarah Glinski, and Matt Heuther the story editor. The script supervisor was Nancy Markle. Episode writers for the season are Duana Taha and Brendon Yorke. The director of photography was Jim Westenbrink, and the director was Phil Earnshaw.

Also this season is another "Halloween special", titled The Curse of Degrassi, which CTV aired on 26 October 2008 and The N aired it 28 October 2008. This time it deals with the anniversary of Rick Murray's death and his haunting former classmates.

== Reception ==
The season premiere was watched by 398,000 Canadian viewers, a figure almost 200,000 fewer than season seven's premiere of 585,000 viewers. When reporting on the figures in his blog, Bill Brioux, the television columnist for The Canadian Press, was surprised that Degrassi: The Next Generation had reached its eighth season with such poor ratings, asking "What other show in the history of Canadian or American television has so consistently drawn so few viewers yet gets renewed year after year?" Viewing figures continued to drop when an average of 220,000 viewers watched the second and sixth episodes; the lowest figures Degrassi: The Next Generation has ever received. That number was even lower for episode eleven, when overnight ratings showed it received 139,000 viewers. The overall number of viewers rose slightly for the thirteenth episode, the first of a two-parter, when it was watched by 157,000 people, but the viewing figures for the key 18–34 demographics was at a low of 81,000. The following week, the episode that concluded the two-parter picked up viewers, reaching an estimated total of 206,000. Brioux commented again about Degrassi: The Next Generation still being on the schedules, wondering when CTV was going to announce its cancellation and noting that The Amazing Race, which follows it in the scheduling, was watched by ten times the number of Degrassi's viewers. That pattern was repeated the following week, when Degrassi: The Next Generation was watched by 222,000 viewers, compared to 1,834,000 viewers for The Amazing Race, 1,579,000 viewers for Desperate Housewives and 1,106,000 viewers for The Mentalist, which were broadcast later in the evening.

Despite the low viewing figures, the season was still a critical hit. The influx of new actors and characters was described as being "fresh", a "chance to bring new energy into the show", and "stir up the school right from its very heart", although original cast member Aubrey Graham criticised the producers and the way it happened. "One day we came in and all the names were just changed on the dressing rooms. Everyone got cut. We go upstairs and it's like, 'Who are all these people auditioning in the front?' They owe us a lot of money. The amount of loyalty, the years we put in with these people... they did us foul. As far as the producers go, I don't talk to anybody over there." Writing about specific new actors, Dani Ng-See-Quan of andPop praised Charlotte Arnold for being able to study a full-time journalism course at Ryerson University and to act full-time in a television series at the same time. Ryerson University's on-campus newspaper, The Eyeopener also praised Arnold for this achievement, as well as fellow cast members and students Raymond Ablack, Nina Dobrev and Evan Williams. Calgary Herald and National Post writer Michael Morrison said Paula Brancati "has become my favorite Canadian actress", admiring her ability to play two different characters on two different series – Jane Vaughn on Degrassi: The Next Generation and Jenny on Being Erica – with an age difference of about thirteen years, and in playing Jane, a character who is the victim of child molestation "[it] is never an easy thing for an actor to portray, but Brancati does it convincingly." This season also promoted awareness in Asperger syndrome; A.J. Saudin's character Connor is a sufferer. Melinda Shankar's portrayal of a first-generation Canadian whose family comes from India was acknowledged, as her character struggles to deal with the culture clash of acting, dressing and dating who she likes, against her conservative parents' wishes. At AfterElton.com, a magazine a website that focuses on the portrayal of bisexual and homosexual men in the media, was critical that the sexuality of new character Riley, played by Argiris Karras, has so far been through the eyes of Peter Stone, Riley's unrequited love interest, and that the storyline served only to advance Peter's character. There was praise, however, that Riley is a departure from previous gay characters Marco Del Rossi, Alex Nuñez, and Dylan and Paige Michalchuck, in that he is confused about his sexuality, and unlike sweet and sensitive Marco, Riley is an alpha male jock who is very much in denial about himself. Jamaican-Canadian screenwriter Annmarie Morais said of the Canadian television industry that Degrassi: The Next Generation is a prime example of a Canadian television series that has garnered international acclaim while maintaining a strong and realistic portrayal of life in Canada. "While in the States, I work with a lot of teenagers and pre-teens, and every one of them knows about Degrassi. Now, that show doesn't have an O.C. formula or Beverly Hills 90210 formula; it's unique and it has a Canadian voice. Shows like Degrassi prove that we can develop shows that have strength across the border."

Linda Schuyler was honoured with the Female Eye Maverick Award at the annual Female Eye Film Festival held in Toronto in March 2009. Leslie Ann Coles, director of the festival, said Schuyler is "one of the most successful, innovative and progressive women" in the TV industry. At the 2009 Young Artist Awards, Jamie Johnson was nominated as a Leading Young Actor in the Best Performance in a TV Comedy or Drama Series.

The Degrassi Goes Hollywood Movie premiered in the US on The N 14 August 2009, before it premiered in Canada on 30 August 2009. The show garnered the highest rating in The N's history, attracting nearly one million viewers.

== Episodes ==
This season had no hour long specials. However a two-hour movie aired as the season finale, which was four episodes combined, called Paradise City: Degrassi Goes Hollywood. The TV movie follows the students during the winter break of the school year.

This list is by order of production, as they appear on the DVD, which is also the order they originally aired.

No. overall	No. in season	Title	Directed by	Written by	Canada airdate	U.S. airdate	Prod. code
144	1	"Uptown Girl: Part One"	Phil Earnshaw	Brendon Yorke	October 5, 2008	October 10, 2008	801
Degrassi welcomes a new group of students as they adjust to high school life. Mia decides to make her junior year memorable when she's presented with an opportunity. Meanwhile, Emma has trouble adjusting from high school to college when Manny and Liberty seem to be moving on without her. Note: This episode marks the first appearance of Melinda Shankar as Alli Bhandari.
145	2	"Uptown Girl: Part Two"	Phil Earnshaw	Duana Taha	October 12, 2008	October 10, 2008	802
Mia's life begins to spiral out of control when her growing modeling career comes in the way of her schoolwork, her friends, and Danny. Meanwhile, Darcy's stubborn little sister, Clare applies her academically, but soon discovers how boys make her feel.
146	3	"Fight the Power"	Eleanore Lindo	Matt Huether	October 19, 2008	October 17, 2008	803
Jane's love for football gives her the courage to try out for the team, despite only boys being on it. Jane is still determined to play but being the sole female teammate causes heated conflicts both on and off the field. Meanwhile, Darcy is moving to Kenya and tells Peter the day before she goes. He is upset and can't stand to see her go, but when he meets Mia at his back-to-school party, they bond over their differences. Note: This episode marks the final appearance of Shenae Grimes as Darcy Edwards.
147	4	"Didn't We Almost Have It All"	Eleanore Lindo	Sarah Glinski	November 2, 2008	October 24, 2008	804
At Smithdale, Liberty decides to pledge for the school's popular sorority, though her determination to join the Greek system ultimately tests her friendship with Emma and Manny. As student council president, Holly J revels in being the queen bee, but after finding out she is the only virgin on the power squad, she attempts to keep her position by going after her crush.
148	5	"Man with Two Hearts"	Graeme Campbell	Matt MacLennan	November 9, 2008	November 7, 2008	805
Peter begins a relationship with Mia and a friendship with Riley. However, he finds out how difficult it can be to balance them both. Meanwhile, Clare and Alli find a surprise at Mr. Simpson's house and decide to take it to school.
149	6	"With or Without You"	Graeme Campbell	Sara Snow	November 16, 2008	November 14, 2008	806
Sav and Anya plan to celebrate their six-month anniversary on the school's overnight trip. Sav's sister Alli tags along, and he becomes furious when he hears the rumors about what she did on the trip with the school's bad boy Johnny DiMarco. Meanwhile, at Smithdale, Manny and Emma both have a crush on their roommate, Kelly.
150	7	"Money for Nothing"	Sturla Gunnarsson	Jeremy Boxen	November 23, 2008	November 21, 2008	807
Holly J. is desperate to keep up her Queen Bee status after learning her parents are having financial difficulties. Meanwhile, Peter's mom, Ms. Hatzilakos, unexpectedly drops in for a visit. She stays at his pad while she's in town, and Peter quickly discovers that his life isn't so rad with mom around.
151	8	"Lost in Love: Part 1"	Bruce McDonald	Matt Huether	November 30, 2008	February 13, 2009	808
At Degrassi, the students are getting ready for the Sweetheart Dance. Spinner's life plans begin to fall apart when he doesn't get into police college, until he gets an unexpected visit from an old friend. Clare has to decide between K.C. and Conner when both guys ask her to the school dance. Meanwhile, Kelly and Emma reveal their feelings for each other and go on a date. Note: This episode marks the final appearance of Drake as Jimmy Brooks.
152	9	"Lost in Love: Part 2"	Bruce McDonald	Sarah Glinski	January 18, 2009	February 13, 2009	809
Spinner is willing to try anything to win Jane back after disappointing her. Clare agrees to go to the dance but not with the guy she really wants to go with. Kelly nearly loses his opportunity with Emma and has to figure out a way to win her back. Note: This episode marks the final appearance of Jake Goldsbie as Toby Isaacs.
153	10	"Bad Medicine"	Sturla Gunnarsson	Michael Grassi	January 25, 2009	February 20, 2009	810
Degrassi has won their first football game thanks to Riley, making him the most popular guy at school. But his steroid abuse and a deep secret may ruin that when he begins lashing out at people. Ex-best-friends Danny and Derek compete for Leia's affection.
154	11	"Causing a Commotion"	Marni Banack	Sarah Glinski	February 8, 2009	February 27, 2009	811
Clare stands up for Conner when he receives unfair treatment from the Shep. Sav and Anya have started hanging out again but as friends. But when Sav thinks he's winning her back, she explains that they didn't break up because she doesn't love him—they broke up because he couldn't balance their relationship with the demands of his family.
155	12	"Heat of the Moment"	Marni Banack	Julia Cohen & Lara Azzopardi	February 15, 2009	March 6, 2009	812
After Alli is continuously taunted by Holly J., Alli starts a hate group about her and posts hurtful things about her on Degrassi's popular Internet social networking site Facerange. Meanwhile, Peter is pressured into helping his father with his half-sister Angel. Note: This episode marks the final appearance of Marc Donato as Derek Haig.
156	13	"Jane Says: Part 1"	Thom Best	Brendon Yorke	March 1, 2009	July 3, 2009	813
Jane's mom wants her father back in her and Lucas' lives, but Jane doesn't want anything to do with him, and she can't remember why. Meanwhile, Danny's new girlfriend Leia doesn't fit in with any of Danny's friends and lies compulsively to avoid them.
157	14	"Jane Says: Part 2"	Thom Best	Duana Taha	March 8, 2009	July 3, 2009	814
After digging into the past, Jane admits to herself that her issues with her dad run far deeper than her parents' divorce, leaving her feeling confused and alone. Meanwhile, Alli encourages Clare to get a new wardrobe, but with it, she gets some attention from boys, which makes Alli jealous.
158	15	"Touch of Grey"	Phil Earnshaw	Matt Huether	March 15, 2009	July 10, 2009	815
Emma is tired of being referred to as "Kelly's girlfriend" and "Blonde Emma" especially when she's not even blonde anymore. In order to shed her plain-girl image, she begins smoking pot. Meanwhile, K.C.'s bad boy past is revealed.
159	16	"Heart of Glass"	Phil Earnshaw	Sarah Glinski	March 22, 2009	July 17, 2009	816
Alli will do anything in order to keep Johnny from looking elsewhere when she worries that she is going to lose him to a more experienced girl. Meanwhile, Peter's been talking to Darcy and planning to visit her, which makes Mia question whether Peter is fully committed to their relationship or if he still has feelings for his ex.
160	17	"Up Where We Belong"	Pat Williams	Michael Grassi	April 5, 2009	July 24, 2009	817
Stress is at an all-time high at Degrassi with exams approaching, and course selections due for next term. Meanwhile, Mia has to make a difficult choice: her education or her modeling career. Also, Sav's parents want him to study engineering in college; however, Sav is more interested in pursuing a music career but isn't sure how to get his parents to support him. And Holly J.'s art teacher thinks she doesn't have what it takes to make the grade.
161	18	"Danger Zone"	Pat Williams	Sara Snow	April 12, 2009	July 31, 2009	818
Blue asks Holly J. to the winter dance in a very romantic way. The problem is Holly J. has a thing for her co-worker, Spinner. Meanwhile, K.C. and Clare are still tense with each other, following Clare's discovery of K.C.'s secret, dark past. Mia begins to wonder what would've happened if Darcy had stayed at Degrassi and suspects she is only Peter's rebound girl.
162–165	19–22	"Degrassi Goes Hollywood" "Paradise City"	Stefan Brogren	Story by : Matt Huether & Vera Santamaria & Sara Snow; Teleplay by : Sarah Glinski & Matt Huether & Vera Santamaria & Sara Snow	August 30, 2009	August 14, 2009	819–822
Kevin Smith and Jason Mewes return to Toronto with an exciting offer that forces Manny, Peter, Mia, Danny, and Jay an impromptu road trip to Hollywood to help her audition. Meanwhile, Paige invites her friends to her new swanky L.A. job as an assistant to a snarky reality star. Note: This movie marks the final appearance of Stacey Farber as Ellie Nash. Aired as a two-hour film, and airs as "Paradise City" in half-hour syndication. Although, it aired as a film, it served as the season finale. Special Guest Stars: Jason Mewes, Kevin Smith, Perez Hilton, Vivica A. Fox, Kelly Carlson, Pete Wentz, and Cassadee Pope.

== DVD release ==
The DVD release of season eight was released online and in select stores by Echo Bridge Home Entertainment in the US on 1 September 2009, this is the second season not to be released by Alliance Atlantis Home Entertainment in Canada, or by FUNimation Entertainment in the US. As well as every episode from the season, the DVD release features the Degrassi Goes Hollywood movie and is packed with bonus material including deleted scenes, bloopers and behind-the-scenes featurettes.

The Complete Eight Season
Set details	Special features
18 director's cut episodes/1 movie; 4-disc set; 1.33:1 aspect ratio; 1.78:1 aspect ratio for movie; Languages: English (Dolby Digital 5.1)	Degrassi Goes Hollywood: The Movie (episodes 819–822); Bloopers; Deleted scenes; Podcasts; Webisodes; On the set webisodes; "My Window" music video
Release dates	Degrassi Goes Hollywood: The Movie (episodes 819–822); Bloopers; Deleted scenes; Podcasts; Webisodes; On the set webisodes; "My Window" music video
(Canada) (United States) Region 1	Degrassi Goes Hollywood: The Movie (episodes 819–822); Bloopers; Deleted scenes; Podcasts; Webisodes; On the set webisodes; "My Window" music video
1 September 2009	Degrassi Goes Hollywood: The Movie (episodes 819–822); Bloopers; Deleted scenes; Podcasts; Webisodes; On the set webisodes; "My Window" music video
