= Degrassi: The Next Generation season 7 =

Degrassi: The Next Generation
- Season 7
- Degrassi: The Next Generation Season 7 DVD
- Showrunner: Brendon Yorke
- No. of episodes: 24

Release
- Original network: CTV (Canada); The N (block on Noggin, United States)
- Original release: January 14 – June 23, 2008

Season chronology
- ← Previous; Season 6 Next → Season 8

The seventh season of Degrassi: The Next Generation commenced airing in Canada on January 14, 2008, concluded on June 23, 2008, and consists of twenty-four episodes. Degrassi: The Next Generation is a Canadian serial teen drama television series. This season takes place during the winter/spring semester of the school year that began in season six and continues to depict the lives of a group of high school sophomores, juniors, seniors and graduates as they deal with some of the challenges and issues young adults face, such as rape, school violence, cancer, drug use, prostitution, sexual misconduct, racism, sexism, parenthood, HIV and relationships.

Season seven aired Mondays at 7:30 p.m. (7:00 p.m. in Quebec) on CTV, a Canadian terrestrial television network. In the United States, it premiered on the Noggin cable channel during its programming block for teenagers, The N. Season seven debuted in the US three months before it began broadcasting in Canada, on October 5, 2007. In total, sixteen episodes aired in the US before they did Canada. Further to being broadcast on television, episodes were made available for free streaming on CTV's website; the season is also available on US and Canadian iTunes. The second Degrassi dedicated soundtrack, Music from Degrassi: The Next Generation, was released on December 9, 2008.

Production took place in Toronto, Ontario between April and December 2007. In addition to the twenty-four regular episodes, two "special episodes" were produced, not part of the Degrassi continuity. The first, "Degrassi in Kenya" depicted the cast members travelling to Africa to assist the building of a school. It aired October 18, 2007 on MTV Canada, and 14 March 2008 on The N. The second, "Degrassi of the Dead", was a Halloween special, and featured the characters being turned into zombies. It aired on 26 October 2007 on The N, and four days later on CTV. In the U.S., "Bust a Move Part 1 and 2" were combined to form "Degrassi Spring Break Movie".

Viewing figures for season seven were not as high as previous seasons; by the twelfth episode, figures were down to 314,000 viewers, a 46% decrease from the season premiere which was watched by 585,000 viewers. Despite the decrease in viewers, however, reviews for the season were of praise, rather than criticism.

== Cast ==
The seventh season features twenty actors who receive star billing, with fourteen of them returning from the previous season. Charlotte Arnold (Holly J), Nina Dobrev (Mia), Mazin Elsadig (Damian), Paula Brancati (Jane), Marc Donato (Derek) and Dalmar Abuzeid (Danny) join the main cast, replacing Daniel Clark (Sean), Deanna Casaluce (Alex) and Ryan Cooley (J.T.).

=== Main cast ===
- Miriam McDonald as Emma Nelson (18 episodes)
- Cassie Steele as Manuela "Manny" Santos (17 episodes)
- Aubrey Graham as Jimmy Brooks (13 episodes)
- Shane Kippel as Gavin "Spinner" Mason (14 episodes)
- Stacey Farber as Ellie Nash (9 episodes)
- Lauren Collins as Paige Michalchuk (7 episodes)
- Charlotte Arnold as Holly J. Sinclair (11 episodes)
- Nina Dobrev as Mia Jones (6 episodes)
- Shenae Grimes as Darcy Edwards (12 episodes)
- Mike Lobel as Jay Hogart (10 episodes)
- Mazin Elsadig as Damian Hayes (7 episodes)
- Paula Brancati as Jane Vaughn (11 episodes)
- Stefan Brogren as Archie "Snake" Simpson (12 episodes)
- Amanda Stepto as Christine "Spike" Nelson (4 episodes)
- Marc Donato as Derek Haig (11 episodes)
- Dalmar Abuzeid as Danny Van Zandt (13 episodes)
- Sarah Barrable-Tishauer as Liberty Van Zandt (12 episodes)
- Jamie Johnston as Peter Stone (12 episodes)
- Melissa DiMarco as Daphne Hatzilakos (14 episodes)
- Adamo Ruggiero as Marco Del Rossi (9 episodes)

=== Recurring cast ===
Former and future series regulars who appear this season in recurring roles include:

- Scott Paterson as Johnny DiMarco (12 episodes)
- Samantha Munro as Anya MacPherson (10 episodes)
- Jake Goldsbie as Toby Isaacs (9 episodes)
- Natty Zavitz as Bruce the Moose (9 episodes)
- Raymond Ablack as Savtaj "Sav" Bhandari (8 episodes)
- Melissa McIntyre as Ashley Kerwin (6 episodes)
- Aislinn Paul as Clare Edwards (2 episodes)
- Deanna Casaluce as Alex Nuñez (2 episodes)
- Jajube Mandiela as Chantay Black (2 episodes)
- Stacie Mistysyn as Caitlin Ryan (1 episode)
- Jake Epstein as Craig Manning (1 episode)
- Daniel Clark as Sean Cameron (1 episode)

Other recurring cast members include Nathan Stephenson as Griffin Pierce-Taylor, Marc Minardi as Lucas Valieri, Steve Belford as Jesse Stefanovic, Linlyn Lue as Ms. Laura Kwan and Michael Kinney as Coach Darryl Armstrong.

The fourteenth episode "Bust a Move, Part Two", which features a guest appearance from Shirley Douglas as Smithdale University's Professor Dunwoody. Episode twenty features a guest appearance from Free the Children founder Craig Kielburger as himself. English pop singer Natasha Bedingfield appears in the season finale performing her songs "Unwritten" and "Pocketful of Sunshine" at the prom.

== Crew ==
The season was produced by Epitome Pictures in association with CTV. Funding was provided by The Canadian Film or Video Production Tax Credit and the Ontario Film and Television Tax Credit, the Canadian Television Fund and BCE-CTV Benefits, The Shaw Television Broadcast Fund, the Independent Production Fund, Mountain Cable Program, and RBC Royal Bank.

Linda Schuyler, co-creator of the Degrassi franchise and CEO of Epitome Pictures, was an executive producer of season seven, as were Stephen Stohn (Epitome Pictures' president) and Brendon Yorke. David Lowe served as producer, and Stefan Brogren as co-creative producer. In several episodes James Hurst was credited as executive creative consultant. Vera Santamaria was executive story editor, with Duana Taha serving as story editor. The editor was Stephen Withrow, Stephen Stanley the production designer, and the cinematographers were Gavin Smith and John Berrie.

The writers for season seven are Emily Andras, Nicole Demerse, Brian Hartigan, Matt Huether, James Hurst, Aaron Martin, Kate Miles Melville, Vera Santamaria, Sara Snow, Duana Taha, and Brendon Yorke.

Directors of the episodes include Phil Earnshaw, Sturla Gunnarsson, Eleanore Lindo, Graeme Lynch, Bruce McDonald, Stefan Scaini, Gilbert Shilton, and Pat Williams.

== Reception ==
Viewing figures of the seventh season of Degrassi: The Next Generation did not fare as well as previous seasons. The first twelve episodes averaged only 455,000 viewers, compared to the same number of episodes in season six, which averaged 500,000 viewers. The season premiere achieved the highest figures with 585,000 viewers. This progressively dropped over the forthcoming weeks from 446,000 viewers on 28 January 2008, to 407,000 viewers on 11 February 2008, and continued to fall to 314,000 viewers over forthcoming weeks.

Despite the poor ratings, the mass media still reacted positively to the season. Joel Rubinoff of the Waterloo Region Record praised the show for "remaining consistent ... [in] its ability to shock and surprise in a way that never lets us [the viewers] down ... Shenae Grimes, whose complex portrayal of a young woman in mental pain—and the conflicting emotions that entails—makes her depiction not only believable, but to those who have had similar experiences, entirely relatable." Raju Mudhar of the Toronto Star also had praise for the season, commenting that "the way that it has managed to deal with aging—which has been the destruction for many of its peers, and the level of honesty and attempted authenticity has always set Degrassi apart. The fact that show has always cast actors within a year or two of their characters' ages has always helped." AfterElton.com, a website which focuses on the portrayal of homosexual and bisexual men in the media, and owned by MTV Networks' Logo cable television network, named the character Marco del Rossi as one of their "Top 25 Gay TV Characters".

Season seven also won awards for its gay-oriented storylines; it was nominated for a GLAAD Media Award in the Best Drama Series category, alongside Dirty Sexy Money, Greek, The L Word and the winner, Brothers & Sisters. In the US, The N was presented with The Trevor Commitment Award by The Trevor Project for breaking new ground in the positive representation of gay and questioning youth. The season was also nominated for a Teen Choice Award in the Choice TV: Comedy category, but lost to Hannah Montana. In the 2008 Directors Guild of Canada Awards, which were held on 8 November, "Standing in the Dark" Part Two was nominated in the Television Series Sound Editing category. "Pass the Dutchie", directed by Patrick Williams, won the award for best direction in the Team Television Series – Family category. In the 2008 Gemini Awards the season picked up four nominations. The series won the award for Best Children's or Youth Fiction Program or Series; Shane Kippel and Lauren Collins were vying for the award for "Best Performance in a Children's or Youth Program or Series" for their performances in the episodes "Death or Glory Part Two" and "Talking in Your Sleep", respectively, but ultimately lost to Alexz Johnson from Epitome Pictures' Instant Star; and Phil Earnshaw was nominated for Best Direction in a Children's or Youth Program or Series for "Standing in the Dark Part One".

It was also during this season that Degrassi won a 2008 TV.com award for best teen clique; Hannah Montana, Greek and Gossip Girl were among the other nominees included in this category.

== Episodes ==
Season seven premiered during Noggin's teen-oriented block, The N, three months before its CTV debut; Canadian viewers had to wait until the thirteenth episode to watch an episode before American viewers. The N broadcast the season in three separate waves, airing the first seven episodes from 5 October to 16 November 2007, before putting the show on hiatus. On 31 December 2007, The N was spun off from Noggin into its own separate channel, and the second wave of episodes aired on the new network from 8 February 2008 to 9 May, before returning once again on 11 July for the remaining six episodes. In Canada, the season premiere aired 14 January 2008 and aired a new episode each week until the season finale on 23 June.

The N aired "Bust a Move" Parts 1 and 2 together as The Degrassi Spring Break Movie. The N aired episode 718, "Another Brick in the Wall" before 717, "Talking in Your Sleep", and 721, "Everything She Wants" before 720, "Ladies Night". CTV held back episode 703, "Love Is a Battlefield", and broadcast it after episode 719, "Broken Wings".

This list is by order of production, as they appear on the DVD.

No. overall	No. in season	Title	Canada airdate	U.S. airdate	Prod. code
120	1	"Standing in the Dark" Part One	14 January 2008	5 October 2007	701
Winter semester gets off to a bad start as the corridors of Degrassi have become a pressure cooker. With an unexpected influx of students from Lakehurst after a mysterious fire burned their school to the ground, Degrassi students find themselves facing old enemies and new friends.
121	2	"Standing in the Dark" Part Two	21 January 2008	5 October 2007	702
Darcy discovers a "roofie-rapist" was on the loose during the ski trip, and takes desperate measures to end her emotional suffering. Meanwhile, Marco is reluctant to consent to a blind date, but Dylan's uninterested conduct persuades him to do so.
122	3	"Love Is a Battlefield"	19 May 2008	12 October 2007	703
Paige's new work at a fashion firm, along with Alex's refusal to get out of bed and build a name for herself, produces a rift between the two. Manny is accused of racism by Holly J, Chante, and Anya, which has disastrous results for Damien's campaign. Note: This marks the final appearance of Deanna Casaluce as Alex Nuñez.
123	4	"It's Tricky"	28 January 2008	19 October 2007	704
Ashley decides to practice music again after she does not receive credit for a song she wrote on Craig's album but finds herself outshone by Jimmy. Meanwhile, Mia has problems with her locker buddy and mean girl, Holly J., when they both vie for Sav's affection.
124	5	"Death or Glory" Part One	4 February 2008	2 November 2007	705
Tensions between Lakehurst and Degrassi students continue to rise amid packed classrooms and the war for school turf. But Jane, the adorable yet tough new Lakehurst girl, is Spinner's target in hostile territory. He also gets a scary diagnosis. Meanwhile, Darcy believes she has come to terms with her rape, but her actions prove this to be wrong when she acts out in class.
125	6	"Death or Glory" Part Two	11 February 2008	9 November 2007	706
Spinner seems to be doing himself in before his illness kills him when he begins acting out recklessly and picking fights with the Lakehurst thugs. Meanwhile, Marco finally begins to accept that Dylan is really gone and starts to socialize with other people.
126	7	"We Got the Beat"	18 February 2008	16 November 2007	707
Although Manny has returned home, the honeymoon period with her parents is almost ended. And Manny takes a stance when her father insists, she attend a traditional "Debut," the expensive celebration many Filipino girls attend for their 18th birthday.
127	8	"Jessie's Girl"	25 February 2008	8 February 2008	708
Caitlin returns to Toronto for a guest lecture at Toronto University, which Ellie is covering for the newspaper. When Ellie catches Jesse and Caitlin hooking up, she spirals down a drunken path. Meanwhile, Mia wants Anya to stand up to Holly J. Note: This episode marks the final appearance of Stacie Mistysyn as Caitlin Ryan.
128	9	"Hungry Eyes"	3 March 2008	15 February 2008	709
Emma, tired of being "predictable," auditions to be a model for Purple Dragon. She finds herself liking the attention she gets but soon learns of the hypocrisy of the company. Meanwhile, Mia asks Sav to help her be better at Badminton, and he agrees but only if she helps him learn how to kiss.
129	10	"Pass the Dutchie"	10 March 2008	22 February 2008	710
Spinner is trying to cope with the effects of cancer and chemotherapy and starts smoking marijuana, which turns Jane away, especially when he begins hanging out with his ex-girlfriend Darcy. Meanwhile, Paige hates her job and decides to take a few days off to relax.
130	11	"Owner of a Lonely Heart"	17 March 2008	29 February 2008	711
Marco is low on cash, and after meeting a friend who takes an interest in him, he considers doing something he never thought he ever would have to do. Manny grows closer to Jay and concocts a sham engagement on the spot to keep her meddling parents at bay.
131	12	"Live to Tell"	24 March 2008	7 March 2008	712
Unable to cope with her rape, Darcy descends down a self-destructive path of lies, promiscuity and disturbing behaviour that could cost her everything about which she cares. Meanwhile, Jimmy is tired of relying on Ashley for everything, and with his friend Trina to help him spread his wings, Jimmy is left with a tough decision to make.
132	13	"Bust a Move" Part One	31 March 2008	4 April 2008	713
Manny wants to attend Smithdale University, which has a great acting department. After an argument, Jay gets revenge and switches her audition tape with their sex tape. Feeling guilty, Jay attempts to fix his mistake. Meanwhile, Darcy's parents send her to a camp for troubled youths. Note: Aired as a one-hour special titled "Degrassi Spring Break Movie" in the US.
133	14	"Bust a Move" Part Two	7 April 2008	4 April 2008	714
Manny finds out what Jay did and is furious. Jay arrives at Smithdale a little too late and finds out Manny blew her audition. It is now up to Jay to correct his wrongdoing and win Manny back. Meanwhile, Darcy is faced with hard lessons of discipline and rigorous self-respect-building exercises. Note: Aired as a one-hour special titled "Degrassi Spring Break Movie" in the US. Note: This marks the final appearance of Melissa McIntyre as Ashley Kerwin.
134	15	"Got My Mind Set on You"	14 April 2008	11 April 2008	715
Danny and Derek team up with Peter and a girl named Rachel on a class assignment. Their friendship is threatened when they both develop feelings for her. Meanwhile, Emma finds it hard to deal with the false accusation made against Snake, and when Damian offers comfort, she develops feelings for him.
135	16	"Sweet Child o' Mine"	21 April 2008	18 April 2008	716
Mia has finally been granted a spot on Spirit Squad, and she's ecstatic. But trying to be a normal teenager proves to difficult when having to remember her parental responsibilities. Manny and Jay's relationship is going well until she wants to meet his parents.
136	17	"Talking in Your Sleep"	28 April 2008	9 May 2008	717
Things heat up between Paige and Griffin, and they culminate in a night of passion. When Paige finds bottles of medicine in his room, she grows scared for her life when she realizes what they treat. Meanwhile, Jane gets closer to Darcy, but her friendship skills need work.
137	18	"Another Brick in the Wall"	5 May 2008	25 April 2008	718
When Snake is finally allowed back to work following the sexual misconduct allegations, he receives a cold welcome from the students. After Holly J. asks Toby to tutor her, she finds herself liking him but is too embarrassed to be seen with him.
138	19	"Broken Wings"	12 May 2008	11 July 2008	719
Jimmy gets into his dream school and wants to have stem cell surgery in order to regain use in his legs. When his father refuses, Jimmy makes a shocking discovery that changes everything. Meanwhile, Peter starts a band with Sav and Danny and tries to get Spinner to be their drummer.
139	20	"Ladies' Night"	26 May 2008	18 July 2008	720
Anya is put in charge of a Free the Children Freedom Fast and tries to make Holly J. and Sav get along. When her plan fails, Anya is thrust into a battle against the Queen Bee herself. Meanwhile, Jay and Manny attempt to get her engagement ring from a pawn shop. Special Guest Star: Craig Kielburger.
140	21	"Everything She Wants"	2 June 2008	11 July 2008	721
Mia is finally getting her life back on track with the help of Lucas, but when Lucas suggests she live a little, things get out of hand, leaving Mia to face the consequences. Meanwhile, Sean returns while on leave from the military and stays at the Simpson–Nelson household. Note: This marks the final appearance of Daniel Clark as Sean Cameron.
141	22	"Don't Stop Believin'"	9 June 2008	25 July 2008	722
Paige, Marco, and Ellie realize that they will soon be going their separate ways. They all decide to spend one more night together as roommates during a city wide blackout. But as fears for the future arises, so do unexpected feelings for two certain roommates which might change their friendship forever. Meanwhile, Liberty and Damian compete to be class valedictorian.
142	23	"If This Is It"	16 June 2008	8 Aug 2008	723
Spinner puts his future in jeopardy when he chooses to play in a band competition over studying for his final exam. Meanwhile, when Manny is offered a role on the popular TV show, "Westdrive," she has to choose between following her dream and going to Smithdale with Emma.
143	24	"We Built This City"	23 June 2008	15 Aug 2008	724
The clock is ticking for the class of '07 as Prom and Graduation approaches, yet it will be one they will never forget as long-held secrets are uncovered, confessions are made, and life-altering decisions are offered. Note: This episode marks the final appearance of Mazin Elsadig as Damian Hayes. Special Guest Star: Natasha Bedingfield.

== DVD release ==
The DVD release of season seven was released online and in select stores by Echo Bridge Home Entertainment in the US on 17 March 2009, this is the first season not to be released by Alliance Atlantis Home Entertainment in Canada, or by FUNimation Entertainment in the US. As well as every episode from the season, the DVD release features bonus material including deleted scenes, bloopers and behind-the-scenes featurettes.

The Complete Seventh Season
Set details		Special features
24 director's cut episodes; 4-disc set; 1.33:1 aspect ratio; Languages: English (Dolby Digital 5.1)		Bloopers; Deleted scenes; Photo gallery; Webisodes; On The Set; Uncut edition
Release dates		Bloopers; Deleted scenes; Photo gallery; Webisodes; On The Set; Uncut edition
Canada	United States	Bloopers; Deleted scenes; Photo gallery; Webisodes; On The Set; Uncut edition
26 May 2009	17 March 2009	Bloopers; Deleted scenes; Photo gallery; Webisodes; On The Set; Uncut edition
