= Puretracks =

Defunct Canadian online music store

- Launch date: October 14, 2003 (Canada); October 13, 2004 (USA)
- Platform(s): Microsoft Windows, classic Mac OS, macOS, Ubuntu
- Availability: Canada, USA
- Website: puretracks.com

Puretracks was a Canadian Digital music store, which launched officially on October 14, 2003. It was one of the first web-based retailers to offer downloadable music for sale in Canada.

== Corporate history ==
Puretracks was formed out of Moontaxi Media, a Canadian company that specialized in streaming music for public settings. Air Canada and The Beer Store were amongst Moontaxi's clients.

Puretracks would later become a division of Somerset Entertainment, owned by Fluid Music. Puretracks had U.S. and Canadian licensing agreements with a number of music labels, and offered a large number of music tracks for purchase and download. The service offered 175,000 tracks for download at launch.

Puretracks was seen as a Canadian alternative to iTunes, which didn't launch in Canada until 2004. Eventually, Bell Canada bought a majority interest in Puretracks. This led to the creation of the Sympatico Music Store.

As of February 20, 2007, Puretracks started offering the majority of its collection in MP3 format to Canadian users without DRM, an approach advocated by theories such as the Open Music Model. The majority of music was sold at 256 to 320 kbit/s MP3 files.

CBC News reported that in doing so, Puretracks became the first major online music store in North American to offer music in the MP3 format.

Puretracks shut down in August, 2013.

== Mac compatibility ==
Both the Puretracks Canadian and US stores were Mac compatible. Tracks and albums downloaded from the store could be saved and downloaded into a music player.

== Puretracks Music Store ==
The Puretracks music store was a digital music download store that operated in North America, offering more than 3.4 million tracks from artists.

It also offered multilingual music stores and customer support, with toggles between English and French in the Canadian music store, and a separate Latin music store (featuring Spanish and English toggles).
