= Songs from Instant Star =

Soundtrack album by Alexz Johnson
- Released: April 26, 2005 (Can); October 11, 2005 (U.S.)
- Recorded: 2004
- Genre: Pop rock, alternative rock, post-punk revival
- Length: 45:39
- Label: Orange
- Producer: Jody Colero and Dave Ogilvie

Alexz Johnson chronology
Songs from Instant Star (2005)	Songs from Instant Star Two (2006)

Alternative cover
- U.S. Cover

Songs from Instant Star is the soundtrack for the first season of the television series Instant Star. The entire album is performed by Alexz Johnson, who portrays the show's protagonist Jude Harrison. Throughout the run of the show, its official soundtracks coincide with Johnson's character's own fictional albums as she consistently works on her music during the storylines of each episode. Jude Harrison's debut album in the first season was self-titled, Jude Harrison.

Some original songs from the first season of Instant Star that were not featured on the soundtrack include, but are not limited to; the song "Frozen" co-written and performed by both Johnson and Joel Feeney in the show. The song "Shatter Me", co-written and performed by Johnson that can be heard in an episode, was also never released but years later, leaked in full online.

In addition, the show featured many other songs throughout the season that were or were not original to the show and were thus never considered for the soundtrack either, such as; but not limited to: "Remote Control" showcased as Jude's Instant Star second place rival and runner-up, Eden Taylor's lead single in-show, that was co-written and performed by Jakalope, "Happy Baby" performed by Shaye, "Millionaire", "Not Alone", "Down & Out", & "Take Me Higher" performed by Evren Ozdemir, "Hit ‘Em Wid Anotha One" by Maestro Fresh-Wes featuring Saukrates, "Here Comes Trouble" by National Velvet, "Beyond the Clouds" by Turn Off The Stars, & "Get Loose" by The Salads.

== Track listing ==
No.	Title	Writer(s)	Length
1.	"24 Hours"	Alexz Johnson, Damhnait Doyle	3:18
2.	"Temporary Insanity"	Andrea Wasse, Christopher Ward	4:14
3.	"Waste My Time (feat. Evren Ozdemir)"	Fred St-Gelais, Rob Wells, C. Ward	3:13
4.	"Let Me Fall"	A. Johnson, C. Ward, Fred St-Gelais	3:25
5.	"Skin"	Christopher Ward, Rob Wells	2:45
6.	"I'm in Love With My Guitar"	Rob Wells, C. Ward	3:21
7.	"Criminal"	B. Johnson, A. Johnson	3:05
8.	"Time to Be Your 21"	Marc Jordan, D. Doyle, Rob Wells	4:12
9.	"It Could Be You"	C. Ward, A. Wasse, Rob Wells	3:03
10.	"Me Out of Me"	Chin Injeti, Fred St-Gelais	2:44
11.	"Pick Up The Pieces"	Joel Feeney	3:08
12.	"Your Eyes"	M. Jordan, Chin Injeti, Fred St-Gelais	3:38
13.	"That Girl"	B. Johnson, A. Johnson	3:38
14.	"Stupid Girl"	Garbage, Joe Strummer, Mick Jones, Paul Simonon, Topper Headon	3:52

- Out of all five Instant Star soundtracks, the song "Criminal" is the only song to never be featured in the show at all. Not only was it featured on the first season's original soundtrack, but it was also included as track three on the 24 Hours physical and digital single.
- Though released on the first season soundtrack, the song "Stupid Girl" is not shown in the first season of the show. It is showcased in the second season. It is also the only cover song by Johnson throughout the length of the show.
- The German pressing of the album is the only version that features 13 tracks, omitting the 14th bonus track "Stupid Girl".

== Personnel ==
- Lead vocals and backgrounds - Alexz Johnson
- Background vocals - Joel Feeney, Damhnait Doyle, Neil Donnell, Andrea Wasse, Lisa Dalbello, Katie B and Dave Ogilvie
- Bass - Patrick Kilbride
- Drums - Rick Gratton
- Guitar and guitar FX - Tim Welch
- Additional guitars - Brendan 'Killa' Johnson
- Synth programming, keyboards, and additional guitars - Trevor Yuile
- Horn section on "Criminal" - John Johnson, Vern Dorge, Dave Dunlop, Terry Promane and Perry White
- Piano on "Time To Be Your 21" - Jonathon Goldsmith
- Piano on "Temporary Insanity" - Jody Colero

== Singles ==
- In the show's canon, Jude's album singles include "24/48", the song she won the competition with, re-written and released as 24 Hours, I’m In Love With My Guitar, Waste My Time featuring Shay, and Shatter Me.
- 24 Hours was released as a stand-alone physical single in Canada, Europe, and the US. It features 3 tracks, "24 Hours", "24 Hours Instrumental", and "Criminal". It is also available on most digital streaming platforms.
- In 2004, 24 Hours was also issued as an exclusive 'Promotion Only' promo single disc to radio stations in Sweden. The CD was delivered in a generic paper sleeve. It featured writing credits and the photo of Alexz Johnson from the Canadian album edition along with The Orange Record Label logo printed directly on the disc cover.
- In 2004, Let Me Fall was issued as an exclusive 'For Promotion Use Only' promo single disc to unknown sources in The United Kingdoms of Sweden and Norway by TMC The Music Company. It featured two tracks, "Let Me Fall (Album Version)" and "Waste My Time (Album Version)". The CD was likely delivered in a generic sleeve and featured TMC The Music Company's logo along with the photo from the US album edition of Alexz Johnson seated with Kristopher Turner and Tim Rozon. The title was listed as Songs from 'Livet Som Stjärna' Instant Star. The writing credits for both songs were printed on the physical cover along with the sentence "Alexz Johnson spelar och sjunder huvudrollen som Jude Harrison i TV serien Livet Som Stjärna pä SVT 2.", which roughly translates to "Alexz Johnson plays and sings the lead role as Jude Harrison in the TV series Livet Som Stjärna on SVT 2."
- In 2006, Waste My Time was released as a stand-alone digital single in various European territories and can be found on Spotify, YouTube, and other streaming platforms outside of Canada and the US.
- 24 Hours (Album Version), Could Be You (Album Version), & I'm In Love With My Guitar (Album Version) are also listed as digital stand-alone singles on various streaming sites in various territories, respectively.
- Season 2's How Strong Do You Think I Am was released as a 3-track physical stand-alone single in Germany in 2006. It features "How Strong Do You Think I Am", "How Strong Do You Think I Am - Instrumental", and the official music video from the first season for "24 Hours".

== Official remixes ==
- The Orange Record Label posted an exclusive download for a remix of "Stupid Girl" on TheN.com in 2005, entitled "Stupid Girl (Orange Record Label Remix)".
- "Temporary Insanity (Remix)" was officially released on the show's fifth and final soundtrack Instant Star: Greatest Hits in 2009.

== Covers and Uses ==
- The unreleased song "Shatter Me", co-written by Alexz Johnson, is the only Jude Harrison song in canon that is not performed on screen by Johnson. Just as she is about to perform the song as a duet in-show, she refuses and walks offstage. Thus, leaving her Instant Star runner-up and rival Eden Taylor, portrayed by Katrina Matthews, to commit career suicide by performing her unaltered live vocals alone. The studio radio single version by Jude Harrison (Johnson), is only briefly heard in the background of one scene with heavy voice-overs. Before the demo leaked online after many years, the only clear and concrete sample of the song available to the public was a 30-second clip heard in a behind the scenes blooper that was included in the bonus features of the first season DVD boxset.
- Also included in the DVD boxset blooper reel is a tiny a cappella clip of Johnson jokingly singing a line from her co-write "Frozen" in-between takes on set.
- "24 Hours" was featured on multiple physical compilation and promo sampler albums during its release in various countries from 2004 to 2006; most popularly, The N Soundtrack that contains various songs from shows airing on The N and CTV at the time. It was also included on 2005's Écoute! Listen Up! released to various Sears outlets throughout Canada. In 2006, German website musicmix-masterlevel.de released a 'for promotion only not sale!' compilation playlist titled Chartbreaker Rock Megamix N° 154, that featured "24 Hours - Video Edit -", only available exclusively to its members. In Poland, three compilation album's that also feature the song include: Top Kids 7, Magic News Vol. 113, & "24 Hours (Radio Edit)" issued exclusively to radio DJ's by Dee Jay Mix Club on the exclusive compilation promo disc entitled Various - June 2006 Part 6.

Used copies of most of these editions can be found for sale from various outlets online.

- In 2004, TheN.com debuted video performances of Alexz Johnson performing a small showcase in New York with a full band. She performed her co-written songs “24 Hours”, “Let Me Fall”, and “Skin”. Two large banners with The N and Instant Star logos on either side of the stage read “The N Presents” on one end, and “Instant Star” on the other.
- Also in 2004, Johnson promoted the show with a televised acoustic performance of “24 Hours” on CTV AM.
- Just before the broadcast of the second season on The N, viewers had a chance to watch Alexz Johnson in concert in a televised special called Instant Star: Backstage Pass, singing two of the songs from each season of the show. Alongside Dave Ogilvie and her brother Brendan James Johnson, they performed a slower solemn acoustic version of their co-write “Skin” as well as "Another Thin Line" written by Brendan Johnson for season 2, accompanied by her band from the show, Spiederman Mind Explosion.
- Alexz Johnson and her brother Brendan Johnson independently released demos of "That Girl" and "Skin" on their 2011 demo album The Basement Recordings. Alternatively, a demo version of "Let Me Fall" performed by Alexz Johnson has also found itself leaked in full online since this time.
- The song "Temporary Insanity" co-written by Andrea Wasse, the lead singer of the Pop/Rock group The Weekend, was later covered by the band. It was released as an official music video and is featured on their 2005 album Beatbox My Heartbeat.
- Demo versions of "I'm In Love With My Guitar", "It Could Be You", "Me Out of Me", "Your Eyes", and "Waste My Time" performed by Andrea Wasse have leaked in full online over the years. Also a version of "Waste My Time" by Fred St-Gelais has also leaked online in full.
- Marie-Mai covered the song "Waste My Time" in French, entitled "Tôt ou Tard", on her 2007 album Dangereuse Attraction. She has also performed it live many times over the years.
- An R&B version of "Waste My Time" is featured on Songs from Instant Star 3 by Canadian artist Cory Lee who showcases her version of the song as her character Karma in the third season of the show. During the premiere episode of Instant Star season three, titled 'Lose Yourself', four different Canadian actors provide brief vocal performances for Jude Harrison's single Waste My Time in various music genres. They each perform the song, competing to be the third Instant Star winner.

Jordin L'Abbe is credited as 'Emo-Boy', Michael Carabine credited as 'Punk', and Jeff Moulton credited as 'Sinatra Snapper'. Karma (Cory Lee) also performs her version of the song in an R&B/Pop style, and wins the competition. As the characters perform, Jude's voiceover states:

"Playing guest-star on the show that made you is a real mixture of pride and nerves. Pride, because you're the original; nerves, because you have to listen to a bunch of strangers re-interpret your music. From emo, to punk, to Sinatra? Still, it's kind of moving to see how my music's inspired others. Inspired them to want to be me--" (Jude sees Karma performing, and shifts nervously in her seat) "maybe even to replace me? There are those nerves again. The ones that never really go away."

— Jude Harrison, Instant Star [Season 3, Episode 1] 'Lose Yourself'
- In the fifth episode of Instant Star season 4, auditions are being held to find the next Instant Star winner. Canadian actor Ryan Allan, cast as 'Reggae Hopeful', performs a brief Reggae a cappella cover of "Waste My Time".
- Canadian actor Steve Comilang is briefly shown performing a karaoke version of "Waste My Time" as Uncle Eduardo in the episode "We Got The Beat" [Season 7, Episode 7] of Degrassi: The Next Generation which first aired February 18, 2008.
- "Time To Be Your 21" was featured in the Pretty Little Liars first-season finale which aired March 21, 2011.
- Independent recording artist Neko Mau recorded a cover version of "24 Hours" in Spanish entitled "24 Horas" that was independently posted online in the mid-2010s.
- The Hot Profit Band recorded a Rock/Blues cover version of "Criminal" and released it independently via their official SoundCloud account in 2016.
- Independent recording artist Dev Huebner included a cover of "Skin" on his original 2019 album Closed Doors, released on all platforms.
- Independent recording artist Pishima Calloway released a music video of her R&B/Pop cover of "Criminal" on her official YouTube channel in 2021. She garnered attention from Alexz Johnson, who praised the artist and promoted the cover video in her official Instagram Stories.

== Charts ==
Chart performance for Songs from Instant Star
Chart (2005–2006)	Peak position
Belgian Albums (Ultratop Wallonia)	55
Canadian Albums (Nielsen SoundScan)	60
German Albums (Offizielle Top 100)	67
Swiss Albums (Schweizer Hitparade)	41
