= Song for Amanda: The EP =

Song For Amanda: The EP

EP by Kyle Riabko
- Released: January 31, 2008
- Label: Columbia/Aware Records

Kyle Riabko chronology
The Duo EP: Volume One (2007)	Song For Amanda: The EP (2008)	The Parkdale Sessions (2008)

Song for Amanda: The EP is a music album by pop singer Kyle Riabko. It was inspired by the actress Amanda Bynes.

- Song for Amanda: The EP was released by Kyle Riabko as a 3 track EP on January 31, 2008. It features the title track and two of his original songs, "I Am Afraid" & "Saying Goodbye". The cover art features the Instant Star logo, and reads "As Seen On InstantStar.com". Riabko announced that "Song for Amanda" was admittedly written as a 'love letter' for American actress Amanda Bynes, and it was an original song he later contributed to the Canadian TV show Instant Star starring Alexz Johnson, which he acts in as the 4th season Instant Star winner Milo. Initially, Riabko petitioned his fans to try and help him get the actress to hear the song by performing an acoustic version in a video that was featured on his official website KyleRiabko.com and his then website www.songforamanda.com, to promote the campaign at the time. He even offered his signed electric guitar as a prize if someone was successful.

-It is unclear if the actress did in fact ever hear the song or contact him.

The title track, along with Riabko’s version of his co-written song "Live Like Music", performed by Alexz Johnson as her character Jude Harrison in the show; are both featured on the show's official fourth season soundtrack Songs from Instant Star 4.

== Track listing ==
1. "Song For Amanda"
2. "I Am Afraid"
3. "Saying Goodbye"
