= Instant Star soundtracks =

The television show Instant Star has produced a series of soundtracks featuring songs from the show, mostly performed by Alexz Johnson, released between 2005 and 2009.

The first two albums contain only songs sung by Johnson, but starting from Songs from Instant Star 3, only four songs per album featured her vocals. It was originally planned for all the albums to be entirely performed by Johnson, but legal issues prevented her from doing this for the 3 and 4 soundtracks, as she had signed with Capitol Records and Epic Records.

== Songs from Instant Star Two ==
Songs From Instant Star Two

Soundtrack album by Alexz Johnson
- Released: April 4, 2006 (U.S.)
- Recorded: 2005
- Genres: Pop rock, rock
- Length: 47:13
- Label: Orange
- Producers: Matt Hyde and Dave Ogilvie

Alexz Johnson chronology
Songs from Instant Star (2005)	Songs From Instant Star Two (2006)	Songs from Instant Star 3 (2007)

Instant Star chronology
Songs from Instant Star (2005)	Songs from Instant Star Two (2006)	The N Soundtrack (2006)

Songs from Instant Star Two is the soundtrack album for the second season of the Canadian television show Instant Star, entirely performed by Alexz Johnson. The album was released by the Orange Record Label, produced by Matt Hyde and Dave Ogilvie and executive produced by Stephen Stohn, who also is an executive producer of the television show. Background vocals are performed by Katie B on most of the tracks and Leslie Stanwyck on track 5. In the show, Jude Harrison's second album was titled Learning Curve.

No.	Title	Writer(s)	Length
1.	"Liar Liar"	Damhnait Doyle, Marc Jordan, Rob Wells	3:42
2.	"How Strong Do You Think I Am"	Christopher Ward, Marc Jordan, Greg Johnston	3:43
3.	"Anyone But You"	Christopher Ward, Damhnait Doyle, Marc Jordan	3:20
4.	"How I Feel"	Damhnait Doyle, Rob Wells	4:25
5.	"There's Us"	Christopher Ward, Rob Wells	4:07
6.	"Over-Rated"	Christopher Ward, Greg Johnston, Jeen O'Brien	3:18
7.	"Natural Disaster"	Dave Thomson, Luke McMaster	3:40
8.	"Fade to Black"	Dave Thomson, Luke McMaster, Marc Jordan, Sarah Caseman	3:32
9.	"Another Thin Line"	Brendan Johnson	3:39
10.	"Not Standing Alone"	Damhnait Doyle, Greg Johnston, Jeen O'Brien	2:59
11.	"My Sweet Time"	Christopher Ward, Rob Wells	3:40
12.	"Who Am I Fooling"	Christopher Ward, Luke McMaster, Marc Jordan, Rob Wells	3:08
13.	"White Lines"	Rob Wells, Luke McMaster, Greg Johnston	4:00

- There are many episodic arrangements, accompaniments, duets, and various edit versions of multiple season 2 songs that were not included on the soundtrack. Such as, but not limited to; "Anyone But You" featuring Tyler Kyte, "Stuck In The Middle With Jude" by Johnson, and "There's Us" performed by Johnson featuring Zoie Palmer as her character Patsy, "Super Star Satellite" & "Who Am I Fooling" featuring Nick Rose as Mason Fox who won the 2nd Instant Star competition in the show, are notable highlights.
- A 30-second demo clip of Damhnait Doyle's version of "Liar Liar" leaked online, along with other full length demos. Full length demos of "Overrated" and "There's Us" performed by Jeen O'Brien were leaked online. As well as a full-length demo of "There's Us" performed by recording artist Valene, and a "My Sweet Time" demo by Johnson, among others.
- "White Lines" demo performed by Luke McMaster has also leaked online. Alternatively, acoustic performances of "White Lines" and "Natural Disaster" were performed by Luke McMaster during his Writing Sessions with Luke McMaster vlog posts via his social media accounts in 2017.

=== Singles ===
- How Strong Do You Think I Am was released as a 3-track physical stand-alone single in Germany in 2006. It features "How Strong Do You Think I Am", "How Strong Do You Think I Am - Instrumental", and the official music video from the first season for "24 Hours".

=== Official Remixes ===
- "Liar Liar Remix" was remixed for the shows fifth and final soundtrack Instant Star: Greatest Hits
- Two "My Sweet Time" Remixes leaked online in full.

=== Covers and Uses ===
- "How Strong Do You Think I Am" and "Liar Liar" performed by Alexz Johnson were featured on the compilation albums The Singles Club - February 2006 Vol. 1 - Prince & The Singles Club - July 2006 Vol. 5 - Jakalope, respectively.

These compilations are available for purchase on various online outlets.

- Just before the broadcast of the second season on The N, viewers had a chance to watch Alexz Johnson in concert in a televised special called Instant Star: Backstage Pass, singing two of the songs from each season of the show and accompanied by her band from the show, Spiederman Mind Explosion. She performed "Another Thin Line" written by her brother Brendan Johnson for season 2 and their co-write "Skin" from season one.
- Canadian Idol 3 top 4 finalist Suzi Rawn covered the song "Over-Rated" on her debut 2006 album Naked.
- The Backstreet Boys covered the song "There's Us". It was featured on the European and South Korean versions of their single Helpless When She Smiles and as a bonus track on the Japanese edition of their 2007 album Unbreakable.
- Canadian actor Adamo Ruggiero as his character Marco Del Rossi, is featured performing a karaoke version of "Anyone But You" in the episode "Free Fallin' (Part 2)" [Season 6, Episode 15] of Degrassi: The Next Generation which aired July 6, 2007.
- Dutch singers Jennifer Ewbank and her brother John Ewbank covered the song "There's Us" as a duet, that was featured on her debut 2011 album London Tree and released as a stand-alone single in 2012, accompanied by an official music video. Also in 2012, Jennifer Ewbank performed a live version of the song solo, alongside her brother's vocal track on the Dutch t.v. show Koffietijd.
- Independent recording artist Anthony Cesar released an Electronic/Pop Rock cover of "Another Thin Line" via his official SoundCloud in 2014.
- Canadian actor Dante Scott performs a cover version of "There's Us" as his character Vijay Maraj in "#RiseandGrind" [Season 2, Episode 8] of Degrassi: Next Class that aired July 22, 2016.

== The N Soundtrack ==
Released in 2006, The N Soundtrack contains "24 Hours" from Instant Star, and various songs from other shows that aired on The N and CTV.

== Songs from Instant Star 3 ==
Songs from Instant Star 3

Soundtrack album by various artists
- Released: July 3, 2007 (Canada); March 11, 2008 (US)
- Recorded: 2006–2007
- Genres: Pop rock, alternative rock, pop, piano rock, R&B
- Labels: Bulletproof (U.S.); Orange (Canada)
- Producers: Matt Hyde; Dave Ogilvie; Stephen Stohn

Alexz Johnson chronology
Songs from Instant Star Two (2006)	Songs from Instant Star 3 (2007)	Songs from Instant Star 4 (2008)

Instant Star chronology
The N Soundtrack (2006)	Songs from Instant Star 3 (2007)	Songs from Instant Star 4 (2008)

Songs from Instant Star 3 is the soundtrack for the third season of Instant Star. In-show, Alexz Johnson appears on 10 tracks, but her contract with Capitol Records produced legal issues that prevented Johnson of being featured in more than four songs in the album. Her versions of many of her character's songs were subsequently replaced by other artists. Including, but not limited to; many of the other performers, songwriters, and producers who were already involved with the series. In show, Tyler Kyte's character Vincent Spiederman, records a solo single (thus far), and Cory Lee's character, Karma, whom is the third Instant Star competition winner, also has a musical career in which she too begins having her songs showcased with limited relevance to the show/soundtrack. Jude Harrison's third album in the show is called My Turn.

=== Releases ===
In Canada, the album was officially released July 3, 2007. There was a physical copy available for purchase in stores. In the US, the album was officially released March 11, 2008. You can purchase the album through iTunes, FYE music stores or Amazon.com.

=== Track listing ===
No.	Title	Writer(s)	Artist	Length
1.	"Where Does It Hurt?"	Greg Johnston, Rob Wells, Christopher Ward	Alexz Johnson	4:22
2.	"Waste My Time"	Fred St-Gelais, Rob Wells, Christopher Ward	Cory Lee	2:57
3.	"What You Need"	Tyler Kyte, Dave Thomson	Tyler Kyte	3:49
4.	"I Don't Know If I Should Stay"	Marc Jordan, Jeen O'Brien, Greg Johnston	Alexz Johnson	3:34
5.	"Just The Beginning"	Damhnait Doyle, Fred St-Gelais, Rob Wells	Damhnait Doyle	3:56
6.	"Love To Burn"	Chris Anderson, Rob Wells, Christopher Ward	Cory Lee	4:08
7.	"Unraveling"	Greg Johnston, Christopher Ward	Tyler Kyte	3:43
8.	"Don't You Dare"	Luke McMaster, Damhnait Doyle	Alexz Johnson	3:58
9.	"I Will Be The Flame"	Dave Thomson, Damhnait Doyle, Christopher Ward	Cory Lee	3:17
10.	"Worth Waiting For"	Greg Johnston, Luke McMaster, Christopher Ward	Tyler Kyte	3:33
11.	"Darkness Round The Sun"	Dave Thomson, Jordan, Rob Wells	Damhnait Doyle	3:21
12.	"Shooting Star"	Greg Johnston, Damhnait Doyle, Rob Wells	Lindsay Robins	3:06
13.	"The Breakdown"	Brendan Johnson	Alexz Johnson	3:15
14.	"No Shoes, No Shirt"	Cory Lee Urhahn, R. Gayle, C. Perry, P. Alexander	Cory Lee	3:30

- "Just The Beginning", "Love to Burn" (Brass/Jazz version), "Unraveling", "Worth Waiting For" and "Darkness Round The Sun" were performed by Alexz Johnson in the show as her character Jude Harrison. Finished versions of "Love to Burn (R&B Version)", "Just the Beginning", & Johnson's version of "Darkness Round the Sun" have all leaked to the web in full.
- "Darkness Round The Sun" on the soundtrack is performed by Damhnait Doyle, and Zoie Palmer performs her version as her character Patsy in the show.
- "Shooting Star" is performed by Lindsay Robins as Patsy's 'studio vocals' for the recording in the episode and her version of the song is featured on the soundtrack; with Zoie Palmer performing her 'rough vocals' on the 'live version' of the song on the show as her character Patsy Sewer. In-show, Shooting Star becomes the title of Sewer's posthumous released album, after her death.
- "Unraveling" and "Worth Waiting For" are performed by Tyler Kyte on the soundtrack, though he does not sing these songs in the show. "Worth Waiting For" lyrics are slightly different than Johnson's version. She sings "'he' was worth waiting for" and for Kyte's version on the soundtrack, he sings "'it' was worth waiting for".
- "I Will Be the Flame" is performed only by Cory Lee on the soundtrack and in a Mini webisode, while the song features Alexz Johnson in the show. A version featuring Johnson was released on Instant Star: Greatest Hits, although it is different from the one featured in the show.
- A R&B/Pop version of "Love To Burn" is featured on the soundtrack, sung by Cory Lee, although it was not featured in the show.
- An explicit version of "No Shoes, No Shirt" was originally posted to Cory Lee's official MySpace and YouTube accounts. The song was launched as an official music video in 2006, with Tim Rozon making a cameo. The music video was titled No Shoes, No Shirt Version 1, though the track is titled "No Shoes, No Shirt, No Service" when it was later included on Cory Lee's sophomore album Sinful Innocence. It was rerecorded and explicative lyrics were edited out to appeal to the shows general audience.
- A different version of "What You Need" was originally included on Tyler Kyte's 2006 EP Let's Talk. It was rerecorded to be included on Kyte's 2008 debut solo album Talking Pictures.

=== Singles ===
- Where Does It Hurt was released in various territories as a digital stand-alone single.

=== Covers ===
- During the premiere episode of Instant Star season three, titled 'Lose Yourself', four actors are shown performing Jude Harrison's single Waste My Time in various music genres. They each perform the song, competing to be the third Instant Star winner.

Four Canadian actors provide brief vocal performances. Jordin L'Abbe is credited as 'Emo-Boy', Michael Carabine credited as 'Punk', and Jeff Moulton credited as 'Sinatra Snapper'. Karma (Cory Lee) also performs her version of the song in an R&B/Pop style, and wins the competition. As the characters perform, Jude's voiceover states:

"Playing guest-star on the show that made you is a real mixture of pride and nerves. Pride, because you're the original; nerves, because you have to listen to a bunch of strangers re-interpret your music. From emo, to punk, to Sinatra? Still, it's kind of moving to see how my music's inspired others. Inspired them to want to be me--" (Jude sees Karma performing, and shifts nervously in her seat) "maybe even to replace me? There are those nerves again. The ones that never really go away."

— Jude Harrison, Instant Star [Season 3, Episode 1] 'Lose Yourself'
- Solo artist Avalon covered the song "Love To Burn" on her 2012 album Mistakes, released on all platforms.

== Songs from Instant Star 4 ==
Songs From Instant Star Four

Soundtrack album by various artists
- Released: June 17, 2008 (Canada iTunes); August 19, 2008 (Canada Physical)
- Recorded: 2007/2008
- Genres: Pop rock, alternative rock
- Labels: Bulletproof (US), Orange (CA)
- Producers: Various; Executive Producer Stephen Stohn

Alexz Johnson chronology
Songs from Instant Star 3 (2007)	Songs From Instant Star Four (2008)	Instant Star: Greatest Hits (2009)

Songs from Instant Star 4 is the soundtrack for the fourth and final season of Instant Star. This album was previewed many times before the release, by the leaking of a "2 A.M." demo sung by Jeen O'Brien and samples posted on The N official website. Jude Harrison's fourth album in the show is titled My Return, it was a reworked version of her third album in the series My Turn after it was deemed over-produced and over-edited.

=== Track List ===
No.	Title	Writer(s)	Artist	Length
1.	"Deeper"	Luke McMaster, Rob Wells, Christopher Ward	Alexz Johnson	3:28
2.	"Ultraviolet"	Luke McMaster, Shelly Peiken	Luke McMaster	3:35
3.	"Perfect"	Luke McMaster, Valerie Poxleitner	Valerie Poxleitner	3:30
4.	"2 A.M."	Christopher Ward, Rob Wells	Alexz Johnson	4:03
5.	"Live Like Music"	Greg Johnston, Kyle Riabko, Christopher Ward	Kyle Riabko	3:39
6.	"The Music"	Luke McMaster, Jeen O'Brien, Damnhait Doyle	Damnhait Doyle	3:16
7.	"Pavement"	Cassie Steele, Isaac Hasson, Mher Fillian	Cassie Steele	3:43
8.	"Remind Yourself"	Chris Burke-Gaffney, Luke McMaster, Christopher Ward	Tyler Kyte	3:22
9.	"Ghost Of Mine"	Emm Gryner, Jeen O'Brien, Rob Wells	Cory Lee	3:01
10.	"Higher Ground"	Damhnait Doyle, Rob Wells, Valerie Poxleitner	Alexz Johnson	3:26
11.	"Here We Go Again"	Valerie Poxleitner, Rob Wells, Christopher Ward	Katia Zuccarelli & Luke McMaster	3:28
12.	"I Still Love You"	Christopher Ward, Rob Wells	Damnhait Doyle	3:24
13.	"Song For Amanda"	Kyle Riabko, Mike Fox	Kyle Riabko	3:42
14.	"That Was Us"	Greg Johnston, Marc Jordan, Jeen O'Brien	Alexz Johnson	3:34

- On Canadian iTunes, the song "Here We Go Again" was initially mistitled as "Songs From Instant Star".
- "Ultraviolet", "Perfect", "Live Like Music", "The Music", "Here We Go Again" and "I Still Love You" were performed in the show by Alexz Johnson as her character Jude Harrison. "Perfect" has been released on Instant Star: Greatest Hits, while "Ultraviolet" and "I Still Love You" have leaked complete on the web. "Live Like Music" and "Here We Go Again" were featured in Mini webisodes. "The Music" is the only song sung by Johnson which does not have a full version presented to the public as of yet.
- Katia Zuccarelli is featured singing the duet "Here We Go Again" with Luke McMaster on the soundtrack, although this is her only association with the show.
- "I Just Wanted Your Love" is the first and final track written by Johnson since the first season of the show. It was not included on the fourth season soundtrack, despite being featured in an episode and in a Mini webisode. Later, it was released on Instant Star: Greatest Hits. An early demo version was released by Johnson and her brother Brendan Johnson on their 2011 demo album The Basement Recordings. It was also the only Instant Star song that Johnson performed live during her very first Canadian tour for her debut album Voodoo in 2010.
- "That Was Us" was not heard nor mentioned in the series, but was featured solely as a Mini webisode.
- Song For Amanda: The EP was released by Kyle Riabko through Columbia/Aware Records as a 3 track EP on January 31, 2008. It features the title track and two of his original songs, "I Am Afraid" & "Saying Goodbye". The cover of the EP features the Instant Star logo, and reads "As Seen On InstantStar.com". Riabko announced that "Song for Amanda" was admittedly written as a 'love letter' for American actress Amanda Bynes, and it was an original song he later contributed to the show. Initially, Riabko petitioned his fans to try and help him get the actress to hear the song by performing an acoustic version in a video that was featured on his own website KyleRiabko.com and his site www.songforamanda.com, to promote the campaign at the time. He even offered his signed electric guitar as a prize if someone was successful. -It is unclear if the actress did in fact ever hear the song or contact him.
- Prior to the release of the fourth season, a demo version of "2 A.M." performed by Jeen O'Brien leaked online. In 2014 the duo Offset Noize & Stravy released an official remix of her demo as a free download on YourEDM.com. It was promoted as their first feature on Your EDM.

For their first feature on Your EDM, Offset Noize & Stravy have sent over this super chill remix of '2AM' by Alekz Johnson. This certainly falls under the hard to categorize genre — there's a little future bass, a little progressive house, a teeny little bit of funk in there too... Jeen O'Brien's vocals are uncompromised in what Offset Noize & Stravy have done. The bass and flow work well together and produce a pretty damn good track.

— Matthew Meadow, YourEDM.com
- Since the cancellation of the show, multiple demos and outtakes performed by the show's songwriters have leaked online variously throughout the years.

=== Covers ===
- On June 16, 2014, an Italian version of "2 A.M." was covered by Italian singer Alessio Santella. It was released on all streaming platforms through UAP Music under license to Pirames International Srl as a stand-alone single entitled Amen (2 A.M.) [Cover Version], accompanied by an official music video.

== Instant Star: Greatest Hits ==
Instant Star: Greatest Hits

Soundtrack album by Alexz Johnson
- Released: September 22, 2009 (U.S.)
- Recorded: 2004–2008
- Genres: Alternative rock, pop rock, R&B
- Label: Orange
- Producer: Stephen Stohn

Alexz Johnson chronology
Songs from Instant Star Two (2008)	Instant Star: Greatest Hits (2009)	Voodoo (2010)

Instant Star: Greatest Hits was released on September 22, 2009. The album has a duet version of I Will Be The Flame by Alexz and Cory from season three, due to popular demand. The album also features the Alexz Johnson versions of two songs from the fourth season of Instant Star: Perfect and I Just Wanted Your Love, as well as two remixes.

=== Track List ===
No.	Title	Writer(s)	Artist	Length
1.	"Temporary Insanity (Remix)"	James Robertson, Christopher Ward, Andrea Wasse	Alexz Johnson	3:52
2.	"Liar Liar (Remix)"	Damnhait Doyle, Marc Jordan, Rob Wells	Alexz Johnson	3:38
3.	"24 Hours"	Alexz Johnson, Damnhait Doyle, James Robertson	Alexz Johnson	3:17
4.	"Let Me Fall"	Alexz Johnson, Christopher Ward, Fred St. Gelais	Alexz Johnson	3:24
5.	"Skin"	Alexz Johnson, Brendan Johnson	Alexz Johnson	2:44
6.	"How Strong Do You Think I Am?"	Greg Johnston, Luke McMaster, Christopher Ward	Alexz Johnson	3:42
7.	"There's Us"	Christopher Ward, Rob Wells	Alexz Johnson	4:08
8.	"Anyone But You"	Damnhait Doyle, Luke McMaster, Rob Wells	Alexz Johnson	3:19
9.	"White Lines"	Greg Johnston, Luke McMaster, Marc Jordan	Alexz Johnson	3:55
10.	"I Will Be The Flame"	Dave Thomson, Damnhait Doyle, Christopher Ward	Alexz Johnson & Cory Lee	2:58
11.	"I Don't Know If I Should Stay"	Marc Jordan, Greg Johnston, Jeen O'Brien	Alexz Johnson	3:32
12.	"Unravelling"	Greg Johnston, Christopher Ward	Tyler Kyte	3:40
13.	"Perfect"	Luke McMaster, Lights (Valerie) Poxleitner	Alexz Johnson	3:26
14.	"I Just Wanted Your Love"	Alexz Johnson, Brendan Johnson	Alexz Johnson	3:08

- Many details about this compilation greatest hits collection have been spread throughout the show's 4 official soundtrack's individual Wikipedia pages.
