= Zuccarelli =

Zuccarelli is a surname. Notable people with the surname include:

- Émile Zuccarelli (born 1940), French politician from Corsica
- Francesco Zuccarelli (1702–1788), Italian painter
- Katia Zuccarelli (born 1992), Canadian pop-country singer and songwriter
- Paul Zuccarelli (1886–1913), Italian racecar driver
