= The N Soundtrack =

Soundtrack album by various artists
- Released: August 1, 2006
- Genre: Pop
- Length: 37:19
- Label: The N Records
- Producer: Boi-1da

Degrassi chronology
Songs from Degrassi: The Next Generation	The N Soundtrack	Music from Degrassi: The Next Generation

Instant Star chronology
Songs from Instant Star Two	The N Soundtrack	Songs from Instant Star 3

The N Soundtrack is an album consisting of songs from various television series that aired on Noggin's teen programming block, The N. Series represented on the soundtrack included Degrassi: The Next Generation, Beyond the Break, South of Nowhere, Instant Star and Whistler.

It was released as a digital download on August 1, 2006, and as a CD on August 29. The N Soundtrack contains the first recording by Drake.

== Track listing ==
No.	Title	Artist	Length
1.	"Degrassi Original Theme (Extended Version)"	The Degrassi Jr. Strings feat. Evren	3:12
2.	"Unwritten (Special live acoustic performance for the N)"	Natasha Bedingfield	3:34
3.	"Not Even Close"	David Kopatz	3:28
4.	"What You're Missin'"	Cheaza	3:14
5.	"Do What You Do"	Drake	3:27
6.	"The Car Song"	Telenovela Star	3:32
7.	"I Don't Want To Know (If You Don't Want Me)"	The Donnas	3:46
8.	"Ordinary Day"	The Dirtmitts	4:04
9.	"24 Hours"	Alexz Johnson	3:18
10.	"Goodbye"	The Sansaysas	3:37
11.	"Hold On"	Mandy Musgrave	2:07
Total length:			37:19
