= Stephen Stohn =

American-born Canadian lawyer and television producer

Stephen Stohn CM
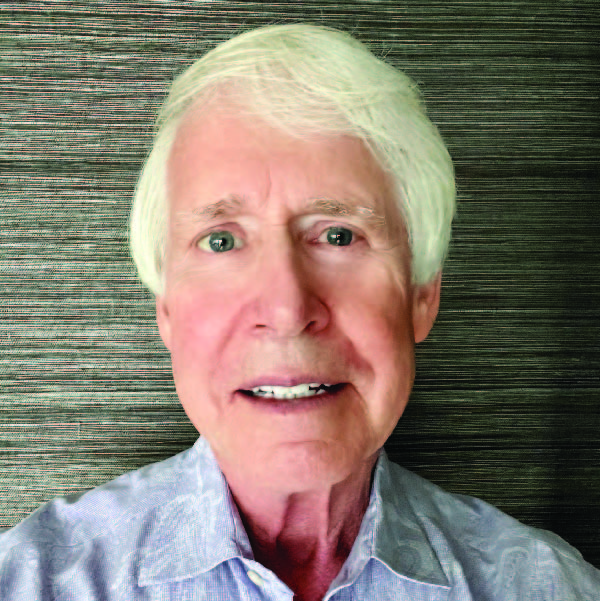
- Stohn in 2022
- Born: May 8, 1948 (age 78); Denver, Colorado, U.S.
- Occupations: Television producer, entertainment lawyer
- Spouse: Linda Schuyler (m. 1995)
- Children: Max Stohn

John Stephen Stohn, CM (born May 8, 1948) is an American-born Canadian entertainment lawyer and television producer. He is best known for his involvement with the Degrassi teen drama franchise, particularly as an executive producer on Degrassi: The Next Generation. Until 2018 he was the president of Epitome Pictures Inc., which he and his wife Linda Schuyler founded in 1992 and was sold to DHX Media in 2014. On June 7, 2019, he was installed as Chancellor of Trent University in Peterborough, Ontario.

== Career ==
Stohn's work in the entertainment industry commenced with part-time appearances as a performing artist, continuing with active work as a songwriter (including two songs that reached the Canadian Top-10, Maybe Your Heart and Once In A Long Time, co-written with Christopher Ward), and a primary career as an entertainment and copyright lawyer since he was called to the Ontario Bar in 1979.

Trent University had barely been built when Stohn attended there starting in 1966. He helped found, and named, Trent's student newspaper Arthur.

Stohn also helped found the radio station at Trent, now CFFF-FM, along with Peter Northrop and Christopher Ward. In the early 1990s, he helped found the Songwriters Association of Canada along with Donna Murphy, Terry McManus and internationally acclaimed songwriter Eddie Schwartz. Stohn has executive-produced two feature films, Me? and The Clown Murders. He was also executive producer of Riverdale, English Canada's first prime-time soap opera, and of the lifestyle TV series Savoir Faire (hosted by Nik Manojlovich) and Room Service (hosted by Sarah Richardson).

=== Book ===
A book of stories from Stohn's life was published by Dundurn Press in March 2018. Entitled Whatever It Takes: Life Lessons from Degrassi and Elsewhere in the World of Music and Television, the book has been written by Stohn with Christopher Ward, and includes a foreword by Martin Gero.

=== Degrassi ===
In early 2000, Linda Schuyler and Yan Moore were developing a new teen TV series with the working title Ready, Willing and Wired, based on the already success. One day Yan came up with the brainstorm that baby Emma, who was born to the then 8th-grade student Spike Nelson in Degrassi Junior High, would be the right age now to be attending high school, and why not make her a main character in Ready, Willing and Wired thus turning the new series into a sequel to the original Degrassi. Inspired by his love for the original Star Trek sci-fi TV series, which had spun into Star Trek: The Next Generation, Stohn suggested Degrassi: The Next Generation as the title for the new sequel series. By autumn 2001 the title remained, and Degrassi: The Next Generation made its first appearance on air.

Stohn co-wrote the opening theme music for Degrassi: The Next Generation with Jim McGrath and Jody Colero. He is also the executive producer of Alexz Johnson's debut solo album Voodoo, and the executive producer of all the various Degrassi soundtracks and Instant Star soundtracks.

=== Other work ===
For nearly 20 years, until 2009, he was executive producer of the telecast of Canada's music awards show, The Juno Awards, and during that period was a director and then Chair of Canadian Academy of Recording Arts and Sciences, the organization responsible for The Juno Awards. He was also Chair of MusiCounts, a charity associated with The Juno Awards, which among other things distributes musical instruments to schools in need.

From 2004 to 2008 Stohn executive produced the teen drama television series Instant Star about a young woman (played by Alexz Johnson) who wins a singer/songwriter contest. In 2011 and 2012 he executive produced the television series The L.A. Complex (formerly called Highland Gardens) for Bell Media in Canada and The CW in the U.S., about young Canadians dreaming of fame and fortune while struggling to survive in an apartment-style hotel in Los Angeles.

His recent projects have included the family mystery series Open Heart for YTV in Canada and TeenNick in the U.S. and the latest incarnation of Degrassi, namely Degrassi: Next Class for Family Channel in Canada and Netflix worldwide.

He has also recorded music as a songwriter and producer for GTA Rhythm Section, an orchestral pop band which Stohn has described as strongly influenced by Brian Wilson and which features Al Jardine's son Matthew on vocals. The band's debut EP, The Orange Sessions, is slated for release in early 2025.

=== Legal background ===
Stohn's industry experience includes being a partner for 10 years in Canada's largest law firm, McCarthy Tétrault. He graduated from the University of Toronto Faculty of Law (J.D. 1977) and Trent University (B.A. 1969). He is a founding partner in the Canadian entertainment law firm Stohn Hay Cafazzo Dembroski Richmond LLP, where he provides strategic legal advice to performers, advertising agencies, merchandisers, recording artists, songwriters, multimedia/internet creators, broadcasters and film and television producers. He and two other partners in the firm constitute three of the fourteen entertainment lawyers named in the 2014 Lexpert American Lawyer Guide to the Leading 500 Lawyers in Canada.

== Personal life ==
Stohn was born in Denver, Colorado. He is married to Degrassi creator Linda Schuyler; they have one son, Max.

== Awards ==
- Stohn has been nominated 28 times in Canada's national television awards ceremony, the Canadian Screen Awards (formerly the Gemini Awards), and has won 14 times. In 2011 he was nominated for a primetime Emmy Award and won a Peabody Award. He was nominated three more times for a primetime Emmy Award, in 2012, 2014 and 2015.
- In August 2005, Stohn received a commendation from the Government of Ontario reading in part: "You are no stranger to Canadian show business, having worked, and excelled, in nearly all facets of the industry. You seem to have worn every possible hat—from performing artist to accomplished entertainment lawyer—and, in doing so, have amassed an incomparable wealth of knowledge and experience. Your skills and expertise have stood you in good stead, propelling you from success to success. Whether producing the internationally acclaimed television series Degrassi: The Next Generation or playing a key role in the development of Epitome Pictures, you take on challenges in a manner appropriately echoed by the words of the legendary Samuel Goldwyn: All opportunities in the world are waiting to be grasped by people who are in love with what they are doing.''
- On March 10, 2011, he was inducted into the Canadian Music & Broadcast Industry Hall of Fame.
- On June 4, 2015 Trent University awarded him an honorary doctorate, Doctor of Letters (D.Litt. honoris causa).

Stohn was appointed to the Order of Canada in June 2023.
