= Devil's Diary =

2007 Canadian television film

- Written by: John Benjamin Martin
- Directed by: Farhad Mann
- Starring: Alexz Johnson; Miriam McDonald; Deanna Casaluce; Magda Apanowicz; Andrea Brooks; Tyler Boissonnault; Brian Krause
- Music by: Michael Neilson
- Country of origin: Canada
- Original language: English

Production
- Producers: Tim Johnson, Kirk Shaw, Rob Lycar, & Lindsay MacAdam
- Cinematography: Michael Balfry
- Editor: Steve Schmidt
- Running time: 90 minutes
- Production company: Insight Film Studios

Original release
- Network: Lifetime
- Release: September 22, 2007

Devil's Diary is a Canadian horror television film directed by Farhad Mann and written by John Benjamin Martin. It stars Alexz Johnson, Miriam McDonald, Deanna Casaluce, Magda Apanowicz, and Brian Krause.

== Plot ==
One night, two teenage friends Dominique and Ursula, wander in a graveyard, and when lightning strikes a tombstone, they discover a mysterious, blank book. The book has a message inside, granting power to those who write into it in exchange for the person's soul. Ursula keeps it, believing fate led her to find it, as they are bullied by cheerleaders, Heather, Georgia, and Lisa.

Ursula wishes harm on Heather, writing in the book to execute her desire of seeing Heather with broken legs. Meanwhile, Dominique, visits her late dad who died, and her mother, is often absent, working to pay the bills. Shortly, Heather's legs are broken by two cars in an apparent freak accident. Guiltless, Ursula attempts to prove the authenticity of the book to a skeptical Dominique, targeting Heather's boyfriend, Kyle, whose face becomes burned and blistered by a corrosive liquid upon falling down during a Chemistry class exam.

Ursula grows pale and diabolical, and the book previously untitled now reads Ephemeris Diaboli. Dominique wants her to give up the book and seek out help, but Ursula objects. Lisa also eavesdrops on their conversation. Conducting a research, Dominique learns the book's Latin name is Devil's Diary in English and a book that only lands in the hands of the ambitious. At the hospital, Georgia and Lisa visit Heather, informing her about Ursula and the book. Dominique looks for help from a church minister, Father Mark Mulligan, after finding out the ancient book is crafted by the Devil and manifests all evil written into it. Although doubtful about the book being real, he instructs Dominique to get Ursula away from it.

Ursula continues to harm people. Heather's friends steal the book from Ursula, and Heather makes Georgia write that Ursula loses her teeth, hair and chokes on her own vomit, resulting in Ursula's death.

Georgia betrays Heather writing to have her killed in a tragic accident. Heather dies in the hospital when a cord strangles her. Georgia has Lisa electrocuted and killed by a stage light for betraying her. Georgia then turns her friends against Dominique. After retrieving the book, Dominique rips pages and tosses it against a wall, and Georgia is sent smacking her head into a nearby wall before she dies.

Soon attacked by her sexually abusive stepfather, Dominique writes in the book, hoping he dies. Frank stabs himself with a pair of scissors, Dominique is saddened to have sold her soul to the book in the process. She brings the book to Father Mulligan and he does not take it. Father Sanchez expresses more ambition and desire to take the book than everyone else before him, and after taking it, this leads to the book consuming him. Father Sanchez punishes Father Mulligan and tries to get Dominique to kill him in order to consummate their union. Instead, Dominique is able to wreck the book, and Sanchez dies in flames that engulf him. Six weeks later, Dominique is in a psychiatric hospital for obsessing over the book. She has a vision, showing two boys finding and taking the book that had been buried in a graveyard, triggering her fear that the cycle will begin again.

== Cast ==
- Alexz Johnson as Dominique
- Miriam McDonald as Heather Gray
- Deanna Casaluce as Georgia
- Magda Apanowicz as Ursula Wilson
- Andrea Brooks as Effi
- Tyler Boissonnault as Craig
- Brian Krause as Father Mulligan
- Laura Carswell as Lisa
- Jake LeDoux as Nate
- Andrew Francis as Andy
- Pablo Coffey as Father Sanchez
- Jason Calder as Frank
- Aleks Holtz as Kyle
- Malcolm Scott as Mr. Rogers
- Dana McLoughlin as Rene

Avan Jogia and Alexander Calvert portray the teenage boys who find the book.

== Release ==
The film was released as the MOW during Fall 2007 on Lifetime (US) and SunTV (Canada).

=== iTunes ===
On November 24, 2009, Devils Diary was added to iTunes.
