= Katia Zuccarelli =

Canadian singer-songwriter (born 1992)

- Also known as: Katia kat karter
- Born: November 12, 1992 (age 33)
- Origin: Toronto, Ontario, Canada
- Genres: Pop; country pop
- Occupations: Singer; songwriter; musician
- Instruments: Vocals; acoustic guitar
- Years active: 2008–present (Note: Zuccarelli has not released an album since 2017, but releases covers regularly to her official YouTube channel since March 2017.)

Katia Zuccarelli (/ˈkætiə zuːkəˈrɛli/; Italian pronunciation: [ˈkaːtja ddzukkaˈrɛlli, - ttsuk-]; born November 12, 1992), known professionally as kat karter and formerly Katia, is a Canadian singer-songwriter.

== Biography ==
Zuccarelli has been featured on YTV series Life with Boys, CTV's Instant Star Season 4 Soundtrack, and as a background vocalist on Selena Gomez's Kiss & Tell. In 2015, Zuccarelli was a top 6 finalist in the Canadian Country Music Association Discovery Program and signed a publishing and development deal with Ole.

Since March 2017, Zuccarelli performs covers of songs by artists such as Shawn Mendes, Taylor Swift, Miley Cyrus, Katy Perry, Selena Gomez, Camila Cabello, and Lady Gaga on her YouTube channel.

Since July 2019, Zuccarelli is an audio production program student at the Harris Institute of Music.

In December 2022, Zuccarelli assisted Nature Canada and Blake Moynes, the Season 17 winner from “The Bachelorette” in a beach cleanup in Hamilton, Ontario, Canada.

== Discography ==
=== Singles ===
Song	Details	Album	
Song	Details	Album	Date Released
Lose My Mind	Writers: Katia Zuccarelli, Jakub Andrew; Label: Ole, Universal Music Canada; Format: Digital Download	TBD	September 23, 2016
Celebrate	Writers: Katia Zuccarelli; Label: Ole, Universal Music Canada; Format: Digital Download	Here's To You	February 10, 2017

=== Albums ===
Studio albums
Title	Album details
Here's To You	Released: May 19, 2017; Label: Ole, Universal Music Canada; Format: Digital download, streaming
