= The Duo EP: Volume One =

EP by Kyle Riabko
- Released: April 2007
- Label: Columbia/Aware Records

Kyle Riabko chronology
Before I Speak (2005)	The Duo EP: Volume One (2007)	Song For Amanda: The EP (2008)

The Duo EP: Volume One is a 2007 EP by Kyle Riabko.

This record was recorded over just five days in February at VROOM! Studios. All melodic instruments and vocals on the record are by Kyle Riabko. All percussive instruments are by Dylan Thomas Hermiston.

== Track listing ==
1. "The Rules Of The Game"
2. "Slow Down Mary"
3. "San Francisco"
4. "Far Away From Home"
5. "Tease Me Mary"
6. "Nothing More"
