= Before I Speak =

Studio album by Kyle Riabko
- Released: 19 April 2005
- Label: Columbia/Aware Records
- Producer: Kyle Riabko, Chris Burke-Gaffney, and Matt Wallace

Kyle Riabko chronology
The EP (2004)	Before I Speak (2005)	The Duo EP: Volume One (2007)

Before I Speak is the debut album from Canadian singer/songwriter Kyle Riabko. The album infuses R&B style with elements of funk and soul.

The album was released a few months prior to Riabko's high school graduation. Each song on the album was written by Riabko. He played guitar and bass for the recording along with backing from former Prince drummer Michael Bland and former Grapes of Wrath keyboardist Vince Jones. Liz Phair and Robert Randolph contributed guest vocals. The album was co-produced by Riabko with Matt Wallace and Chris Burke-Gaffney, who acts as Riabko's manager.

Most of the album's recording took place at Sound City in Los Angeles. The tracks "Before I Speak" and "Doesn't Get Much Better" were recorded in Riabko's bedroom at his parents' home just prior to the completion of the album. Three singles were released from the album: "Carry On," "Do You Right," and "What Did I Get Myself Into."

== Track listing ==
1. "Learn To Speak" (Intro)
2. "Do You Right"
3. "What Did I Get Myself Into"
4. "Half As Much"
5. "Miss Behavin’"
6. "Carry On"
7. "Chemistry Blues" (Interlude)
8. "Before I Speak"
9. "Waiting"
10. "Paranoid"
11. "Teach Me"
12. "Chemistry" (feat. Liz Phair)
13. "Doesn’t Get Much Better"
14. "Until Next Time" (Outro)
15. "Good Time"
16. "Devil" (hidden track)
