= List of Instant Star episodes =

The following is an episode list for the Canadian drama series Instant Star. The series premiered on September 15, 2004 and ended on July 28, 2008.

== Seasons ==
Season	Episodes	Originally released		
Season	Episodes	First released	Last released	Network
1	13	September 15, 2004	April 24, 2005	CTV
2	13	February 10, 2006	May 12, 2006	The N
3	13	February 16, 2007	May 18, 2007	The N
4	13	June 2, 2008	July 28, 2008	The N

=== Season 1 (2004–05) ===
No. overall	No. in season	Title	Original release date	US air date	Prod. code
1	1	"Even Better than the Real Thing"	September 15, 2004	July 1, 2005	101
Jude Harrison enters G Major's singer/songwriter contest called Instant Star. She was so nervous, but then she ends up winning the contest. From this point on, her life is no longer "normal." Her sister Sadie is extremely jealous of her and her friends don't know how to act around her. She discovers that her producer is Little Tommy Q from Boyz Attack, and that he is very hot. Featured song: "24 Hours" (Inspiration: U2)
2	2	"Come As You Are"	September 15, 2004	July 1, 2005	102
Jude loses the cover of a magazine by Darius, a famous hip hop producer, to Eden a.k.a. the beach blonde she-devil who she beat in the Instant Star competition. Now she and Tommy must go to Darius' party to impress him and prove to him that Jude belongs on the cover of his magazine, not Eden. Eden insults Jude and Sadie sticks up for Jude and fights Eden, resulting in the three girls falling the pool. After all that mishap, it seems likely that Jude lost the cover, but an unlikely person sees something in her and it ultimately saves the day. Featured song: "Let Me Fall" (Inspiration: Nirvana)
3	3	"Oh Well, Whatever, Nevermind"	January 30, 2005	July 8, 2005	103
Jude's publicist arranges for her to perform her first single in front of the entire school. Jude is very excited, and lets herself get caught up in all the attention. But she must face two obstacles: some of her classmates are planning an anti-Jude walkout and her best friend Jamie hates her song. Featured song: "I'm In Love With My Guitar" (Inspiration: "Smells Like Teen Spirit" by Nirvana)
4	4	"Hey Sister"	February 6, 2005	July 15, 2005	104
When Jude plays her new song for the radio and gets some very bad reactions, Tommy threatens to quit. Jude doesn't want that to happen, so she insists that they work on a new hit single alone at her parents' country house. Tommy reluctantly agrees, and so Jude and Tommy find themselves connecting over more than just the music. Things are going well, until Jude's hot older sister Sadie shows up and starts flirting with Tommy, leading to a disastrous fight. Featured song: "Could Be You" (Inspiration: D.O.A.)
5	5	"You Can't Always Get What You Want"	February 13, 2005	July 22, 2005	105
Just when Jude is feeling comfortable at G Major and with Tommy, her world turns upside down when she learns that Tommy has to produce a single for Shay (known as "S TO THE H TO THE A TO THE Y"), the nephew of the famous hip hop producer Darius. After Jude gets downright honest and blunt with Shay, she is forced to apologize. But then Shay serenades her at his concert. Featured song: "Waste My Time" (Inspiration: The Rolling Stones)
6	6	"Kiss Me Deadly"	February 20, 2005	July 29, 2005	106
Jude's first video, her duet with Shay, will feature one thing that Jude isn't very good at: dancing. They then decide to change the theme of the video, and the end of the video is supposed to feature a hot kiss between Jude and Shay. This is Jude's first real kiss which is why she is more nervous about it, and she hasn't had a lot of good experiences with kisses. The one problem is that Shay doesn't want to be her boyfriend, raising questions about how Jude would kiss Shay on camera when he basically dumped her. Featured song: "Waste My Time" (Inspiration: Lita Ford)
7	7	"I Wanna Be Your Boyfriend"	February 27, 2005	August 5, 2005	107
Now that Shay and Jude are an official couple, Jude wants to share him with the rest of the world. So she invites him to the school dance and to have dinner with her family. But things take and awkward twist when Tommy shows up to prove to Jude that Shay is not the guy she thinks he is. Sadie invites him to join them for dinner, Tommy mentions the 3 month world tour that Shay has, and now Jude is having some doubts. Featured song: "Your Eyes" (Inspiration: The Ramones)
8	8	"Unsweet Sixteen"	March 6, 2005	August 12, 2005	108
It's Jude's 16th birthday and G Major is planning the birthday party of a lifetime. But when she overhears someone's love confession and discovers what Shay has been up to while he's been on tour, her birthday is about to turn into a huge disaster. As she has an intimate moment with someone, the night would go messy, ending in Jude having her heart broken by two different guys. Featured song: "Time To Be Your 21" (Inspiration: Wakefield)
9	9	"Won't Get Fooled Again"	March 13, 2005	August 19, 2005	109
Jude decides to chill at home after having her heart broken by two different guys in one night, on her one special night. Sadie and her dad aren't exactly getting along, and Jude is wondering what is going on. Meanwhile, her relationship with Tommy is quickly turning ugly and just when she thinks that she has reached the maximum level of anger, she finds out what her dad did to make Sadie mad at him, something very betraying. Featured song: "Skin" (Inspiration: The Who)
10	10	"Lose This Skin"	March 20, 2005	August 26, 2005	110
Jude turns to Jamie after her parents broke up, and Jamie knows that she can't handle any more horrible surprises, so he tells her about him and Kat dating for a while now. Of course, Jude plays the supportive best friend who's happy for her two best friends finding true love. But suddenly she realizes that all this time she spent obsessing over her career, Tommy, and Shay, she wanted that boy-next-door all to herself. Featured song: "Me out of Me" (Inspiration: The Clash)
11	11	"All Apologies"	March 27, 2005	September 9, 2005	111
Jude is very happy that she will be performing at some big music charity do that she grew up watching as a child, but she is not so happy when she finds out that she is singing a duet with Eden, the person she beat in the Instant Star contest and the person who stole Shay from her. Tommy insists that they forget everything that happened and move on, until a member of Boyz Attack, his nemesis, shows up, pushing a Boyz Attack reunion. This charity event was not expected to end in peace. Featured song: "Pick Up the Pieces" (Inspiration: Nirvana)
12	12	"Train in Vain"	March 13, 2005	September 16, 2005	112
Jude is excited because she is almost done recording her album, but her excitement quickly simmers down when she learns that Tommy might not produce his next album. Jude figures that if she figures out a way to relaunch his solo career, he'll still want to produce her, but she must remember that she might have to make some sacrifices to push her success as well. Featured song: "That Girl" (Inspiration: The Clash)
13	13	"Should I Stay Or Should I Go?"	March 20, 2005	September 23, 2005	113
It has been a long, adventurous ride for Jude Harrison, the first winner of the Instant Star contest. As she prepares for her summer tour, as usual, she has many problems to face. Questions arise about what she is supposed to do when she learns her producer is dating her sister, receives a very shocking offer from her ex-boyfriend, and a romantic ultimatum from her best friend. This perts her ability to handle all of this before going on her summer tour in doubt. Featured song: "Temporary Insanity" (Inspiration: The Clash)

=== Season 2 (2006) ===
No. overall	No. in season	Title	Original release date	Canadian air date	Prod. code
14	1	"No Sleep 'Til Brooklyn"	February 10, 2006	June 18, 2006	201
15	2	"No Sleep 'Til Brooklyn"	February 17, 2006	June 25, 2006	202
Jude returns from her summer tour with her backup band Spiederman to find that G Major is being run by Darius Mills and when Jude doesn't play at a showcase the way he wants her to, tension builds. Tommy is trying to do the best he can to please Darius, so he doesn't have time to hang out with Sadie when she comes back from Europe. After messing up due to poor advice, Jude was later required to grovel to keep her recording contract. Jamie soon learns that Jude can't help him keep his job as managing SME and that she has her own problems. Sadie, upset with Tommy, soon realizes that she messed up. Jamie dumps Jude and she decides to dye her hair blonde. Featured songs: "My Sweet Time" and "Stupid Girl" (Inspiration: Beastie Boys)
16	3	"I Fought the Law"	February 24, 2006	June 25, 2006	203
An interview with a radio shock jock leaves Jude feeling humiliated and down on herself. Unsupported by SME, Jude loses her "voice". Meeting free-spirited Patsy gives Jude a boost but at the same time gets her into some trouble. Featured song: "Over-Rated" (Inspiration: The Clash)
17	4	"Miss World"	March 3, 2006	August 8, 2006	204
Jude's efforts to make a second album get stalled by Darius and Liam, who demand she cough up some major money for studio time. Jude comes up with a way to make some fast cash, but unfortunately her idea creates more friction between her parents. Featured song: "Not Standing Around" (Inspiration: Hole)
18	5	"Viciousness"	March 10, 2006	June 17, 2007	205
Kat sets out to hurt Jude because she is jealous of Jude's successes and she can't seem to find her place in her best friend's life. Tommy suffers a crisis of confidence, feeling that he can't measure up to Liam, his more experienced coworker. Jude's song is set to premiere in a horror film entitled Viciousness. Featured song: "Fade to Black" (Inspiration: Lou Reed)
19	6	"The Jean Genie"	March 17, 2006	August 15, 2006	206
The stage throbs with the beat of Jude and SME rocking out on Anyone But You and there's definite onstage electricity between Jude and adorable lead guitarist, Spiederman. Spiederman wants Jude to consider the possibility of transforming their sizzling onstage chemistry into an offstage romance, but Jude is running scared. Featured song: "Anyone But You" (Inspiration: David Bowie)
20	7	"Stranger in the House"	April 7, 2006	August 22, 2006	207
Sadie's relationship with Tommy is on the rocks because of his lies. Jude initially tries to patch things up between the two but then has second thoughts. Jude and Sadie decide to throw a party. Jamie sees another side to Liam after he starts working with Patsy in the studio. Featured song: "Natural Disaster" (Inspiration: Rick Springfield)
21	8	"Personality Crisis"	April 7, 2006	August 29, 2006	208
Jude is thrilled to be nominated for a music award, but what she finds less exciting is the prospect of attending the ceremonies with Spiederman, who hasn't been the ideal boyfriend lately. So it's understandable when Jude agrees to let Mason escort her to the event. Featured song: "Who Am I Fooling" (Inspiration: New York Dolls)
22	9	"Hallelujah"	April 14, 2006	May 27, 2007	209
Jude is determined to have a normal, non-famous, non-G-Major-drama seventeenth birthday with her friends and family – minus her former friend and producer. But fate has other plans, and Jude finds herself locked in a most unusual setting with Tommy. As a result, speculation over whether they will tear each other apart or make beautiful music together arises. Featured song: "Liar Liar" (Inspiration: Leonard Cohen)
23	10	"Problem Child"	April 21, 2006	June 3, 2007	210
Jude's never been a stellar student, but when she fails music, she's stunned. Sent to visit an elementary school to do emergency publicity damage, Jude faces down her biggest fans. But when she gives one budding songwriter some questionable advice, Jude can't help but wonder if it's possible to be both a terrible student and an awful teacher. Featured song: "How I Feel" (Inspiration: AC/DC)
24	11	"Mother's Little Helper"	April 28, 2006	June 10, 2007	211
Sadie is unhappy about Jude and Tommy working so closely together, and both of the Harrison sisters are upset with their mom's surprise decision to sell their childhood home. Jude realizes some of her money is missing and wonders if it could have been stolen. She blames her mother, not realizing it was Sadie who took it due to her jealousy of Jude and Tommy. Featured song: "How Strong Do You Think I Am" (Inspiration: The Rolling Stones)
25	12	"When I Come Around"	May 5, 2006	June 17, 2007	212
Jude's second album is officially finished; however, Darius isn't pleased with the results, which means that Jude and Tommy are back in the studio, where they end up rekindling their relationship. Meanwhile, Spiederman realizes something isn't right with him and Jude. Featured song: "White Lines" (Inspiration: Green Day)
26	13	"Date with the Night"	May 12, 2006	June 24, 2007	213
Jude's life seems too good to be true, with a fabulous record release party in the works and a romance with Tommy a strong possibility, but then something truly terrible happens. Featured songs: "There's Us", "Another Thin Line" (Inspiration: Yeah Yeah Yeahs)

=== Season 3 (2007) ===
No. overall	No. in season	Title	Original release date	Canadian air date	Prod. code
27	1	"Lose Yourself"	February 16, 2007	June 26, 2007	301
Jude's life is changing for the best. Her CD is skyrocketing, and she's become a real star. That is, until the new Instant Star Karma comes in and changes everything for the worst. Featured song: "I Don't Know If I Should Stay" (Inspiration: Eminem); accompanied by short film "If I Should Stay"
28	2	"Like a Virgin"	February 23, 2007	July 7, 2007	302
In an interview, Karma says she's a virgin, and they automatically assume that Jude isn't. Jude and Karma begin to not get along, and Jude ends up flashing her boob to an entire 13th birthday party while performing. Featured song: "I Will Be The Flame" (Inspiration: Madonna); accompanied by short film "I'm a Degrassi, I'm an Instant Star"
29	3	"Start Me Up"	March 2, 2007	July 15, 2007	303
Jude has to deal with the aftermath of her breast being shown to the public, just as she learns that not only will Karma be doing a cover of "Waste My Time", but that Tommy will also be producing her album. Featured songs: "Worth Waiting For", "Shooting Star" (Inspiration: The Rolling Stones); accompanied by short film "The Flame"
30	4	"Helter Skelter"	March 9, 2007	July 22, 2007	304
Patsy's burning out fast, and Jude's not sure she can stop her or if Patsy even wants her to. Featured songs: "Darkened 'Round the Sun" and "There's Us" (Inspiration: The Beatles); accompanied by short film "Warrior Princess"
31	5	"Let It Be"	March 16, 2007	July 25, 2007	305
Jude usually deals with her own G Major drama, but now she's forced to deal with someone who can't speak for herself. Featured song: "Darkness 'Round the Sun" (Inspiration: The Beatles); accompanied by short film "Geometry of Love"
32	6	"Heart of Gold"	March 23, 2007	July 29, 2007	306
Jude is planning a major event dedicated to Patsy, who would be turning 23 if it hadn't been for her untimely death. She really needs Sadie to help, but when Jude dumps a little to much responsibility on her, Sadie drops the bomb... Sadie's sick of being the help and plans on moving to New York so she can live her own life. Meanwhile, Jamie sets his sights on signing a new act on the G-Major label. Featured songs: "Just the Beginning", "Worth Waiting For" (Inspiration: Neil Young); accompanied by short film "Instant Noir"
33	7	"The Long and Winding Road"	March 30, 2007	August 1, 2007	307
Jude and Tommy want to produce a hit record so they hit the road to find unique recording locations. As much as Tommy tries to hide it, his past comes bubbling up along with his feelings for Jude. Featured song: "Don't You Dare" (Inspiration: The Beatles); accompanied by short film "My Best Friend's Wedding"
34	8	"18: Part 1"	April 6, 2007	August 5, 2007	308
35	9	"18: Part 2"	April 13, 2007	August 12, 2007	309
Jude's turning 18; Tommy loves her; life is good. So why won't he let her sing about him on stage at her birthday party? And who's the mysterious dude from Tommy's past that's making him flip out? Jude's 18 now, why isn't everything instantly perfect?!?! Things aren't perfect for Sadie either, and she's wondering if Kwest is the right guy for her. She might doubt it so much that she'll never find out. After performing the song about her relationship with Tommy, Jude expects everything to be fine and for Tommy to make the announcement with her. They're together! But his reaction isn't as great as she hoped. He embarrasses her in front of cameras and runs off to Sadie. Meanwhile, Jude runs to someone else for comfort. Featured song: "Love to Burn" (Inspiration: Moby); accompanied by short films "8 Kilometers" and "Hollywood Undercover"
36	10	"Nowhere to Run"	April 27, 2007	August 19, 2007	310
An MTV crew is supposed to be filming the production of Jude's new single. With Tommy producing, everything goes wrong and Jude ends up producing it herself. Also, Speed is keeping a secret from the band. Featured song: "How I Feel" (Inspiration: Kiss); accompanied by short film "What You Need"
37	11	"Celebrity Skin"	May 4, 2007	August 28, 2007	311
Things go bad for Jude when she wears a vest made of real animal fur. Animal rights activists protest against her so she tries to fix it but instead accidentally insults meat eaters. With all of this drama going on, everyone wants to see Jude hurt. Everyone at G Major has to work hard to protect her or else something terrible might happen. Featured song: "Breakdown" (Inspiration: Hole); accompanied by short film "Hollywood Undercover II"
38	12	"Sympathy for the Devil"	May 11, 2007	September 2, 2007	312
Jude is still dealing with recently getting attacked while finding time to plan a party for Darius. Jude and Jamie also try to fix Sadie's love life by trying to get Sadie and Kwest back together. Meanwhile, Tommy tries to fix his life, but some secrets may be holding him back. Featured song: "White Lines" (Inspiration: The Rolling Stones); accompanied by short film "Tommy and Portia"
39	13	"All I Want Is You"	May 18, 2007	September 2, 2007	313
After finding out Darius and Portia's secret, the people of G Major aren't too happy after concerns over the possible folding Jude's record label, but that really isn't her biggest worry. It turns out she isn't the owner of her own music, and even bigger than that; both Jamie and Tommy want her affections. Both of them have an offer Jude can't refuse, but which one will she accept? Featured song: "Where Does It Hurt?" (Inspiration: U2)

==== Season 3 short films ====
No.	Title	Original release date
1	"If I Should Stay"	February 17, 2007
2	"I'm a Degrassi, I'm an Instant Star"	February 24, 2007
3	"The Flame"	March 3, 2007
4	"Warrior Princess"	March 10, 2007
5	"Geometry of Love"	March 17, 2007
6	"Instant Noir"	March 24, 2007
7	"My Best Friend's Wedding"	March 31, 2007
8	"8 Kilometers"	April 7, 2007
9	"Hollywood Undercover"	April 14, 2007
10	"What You Need"	April 28, 2007
11	"Hollywood Undercover II"	May 5, 2007
12	"Tommy and Portia"	May 12, 2007

=== Season 4 (2008) ===
No. overall	No. in season	Title	Original release date	Canadian air date	Prod. code
40	1	"Your Time Is Gonna Come"	June 2, 2008	June 8, 2008	401
Featured song: "Ultraviolet" (Inspiration: Led Zeppelin)
41	2	"She Drives Me Crazy"	June 9, 2008	June 15, 2008	402
Featured song: "Deeper" (Inspiration: Fine Young Cannibals)
42	3	"Changes"	June 16, 2008	June 22, 2008	403
Featured song: "Remind Yourself" (Inspiration: Fine Young Cannibals)
43	4	"Us and Them"	June 23, 2008	June 29, 2008	404
Featured songs: "Perfect", "My Sweet Time", "Pick Up the Pieces", "The Breakdown", "I Will Be the Flame" (Inspiration: Floyd)
44	5	"We Belong"	June 30, 2008	July 6, 2008	405
Featured songs: "I Still Love You", "Pavement" (Inspiration: Pat Benatar)
45	6	"My Hometown"	July 7, 2008	July 13, 2008	406
Featured song: "Here We Go Again" (Inspiration: Bruce Springsteen)
46	7	"Not an Addict"	July 7, 2008	July 20, 2008	407
Featured song: "I Just Want Your Love" (Inspiration: K's Choice)
47	8	"Brilliant Mistake"	July 14, 2008	July 27, 2008	408
Featured song: "Live Like Music" (Inspiration: Elvis Costello)
48	9	"Possession"	July 14, 2008	August 3, 2008	409
Featured songs: "Higher Ground", "Pavement" (Inspiration: The Cure)
49	10	"Every Breath You Take"	July 21, 2008	August 10, 2008	410
Featured song: "Ghost of Mine" (Inspiration: The Police)
50	11	"She Walks on Me"	July 21, 2008	August 17, 2008	411
Featured songs: "Song for Amanda", "Ultraviolet" (Inspiration: Hole)
51	12	"Gimme Gimme Shock Treatment"	July 28, 2008	August 24, 2008	412
Featured song: "2 A.M." (Inspiration: The Ramones)
52	13	"London Calling"	July 28, 2008	August 31, 2008	413
Featured songs: "The Music", "Unraveling", "I Just Wanted Your Love", "2 AM", "Remind Yourself" (Inspiration: The Clash)

== Instant Star Minis ==
=== Season 3 ===
Starting in Season 3, Instant Star Mini webisodes have appeared on The N.com's The Click.

1. "If I Should Stay" - Tommy shows Jude how to find her everything.
2. "I'm a Degrassi, I'm an Instant Star" - Degrassi vs. Instant Star.
3. "The Flame" - Karma makes Tommy her own by sexing up her new single.
4. "Warrior Princess" - Sadie is a ninja. Like a real, honest to God, nun chuck wielding, kick-your-ass-with-a-pole ninja.
5. "Geometry Of Love" - Jamie puts on a lab coat and dissects the sordid steaming mass of Instant Star romance.
6. "Instant Noir" - Gams, hats, dames, and Tommy kissing Jude. Wait, what are "gams" again?
7. "My Best-Friend's Wedding" - Imagine the not-too-distant future... It's Jude's wedding day... So who the hell is she marrying?
8. "8 Kilometers" - Lose yourself. No seriously, lose yourself before Spiederman starts rapping.
9. "Hollywood Undercover" - Jude Harrison is secretly married and on drugs and viciously assaulting innocent reporters! It's all true! Kind of!
10. "What You Need" - Watch Spiederman's first music video.
11. "Hollywood Undercover 2" - That Jude. When she's not carousing with babes, she's cavorting with hotties.
12. "Tommy and Portia" - Tommy and Portia spiral downward into mistrust and death.

=== Season 4 ===
1. "Higher Ground" - Mini webisode that features the brand new song Higher Ground.
2. "I Just Wanted Your Love" - Nothing's like singing a song about the old and good love in the kitchen.
3. "That Was Us" - Flashback about the good moments between Jude and Tommy.
4. "Remind Yourself" - Spiederman Mind Explosion's new song, featuring the over-possessive Karma.
5. "Live Like Music" - Not just hear it, live it.
6. "Ultraviolet" - First mini performance of the 4th season by Jude, with Tommy and Jamie watching in two different places.
7. "The Music" - Imagine that Jude never won Instant Star contest, and she plays on the streets with SME.
8. "Perfect" - It's Jude in gold sequins and the SME in crazy weirdness.
9. "Here We Go Again" - Jude and Tommy's first duet sets the woods on fire.
10. "Ghost of Mine" - Karma, Spied, Sadie and Blu go Dreamgirls-style.
11. "2 a.m." - The snow falls, Jude sings and Tommy wants to recover their love.

== Instant Star: On the set ==
=== Season 3 ===
Along with Instant Star mini's, The N.com takes you backstage of Instant Star. Also appearing on The N.com's The Click.

1. "Time to Sing Again" - Be there as Alexz steps on stage to perform the first song from the new season of Instant Star.
2. "Tim and Alexz Time" - What Tim and Alexz have together no one can take away. Not that anyone's tried.
3. "20 Minute Rain Delay" - The cast shot the boob-out bar mitzvah at a real celeb's house. Whose house was it is top secret. But after 20 minutes standing in the rain, they told us anyway.
4. "One Flew Over the Photo Shoot" - Nothing says "photo shoot day" like Tim Rozon doing the cabbage patch.
5. "Going Out With a Bang" - The thing about TV is, when you need to shoot a deadly car crash, you can't actually kill anybody.
6. "On the Steps of a Mansion" - Tim Rozon proves it's not how well you sing, it's how well you do The Grab.
7. "A Day in the Country" - Ahh, the Instant Star life: relaxing in a verdant meadow, napping with Tim Rozon, busting up $100,000 sports cars...
8. "The Making of 'What You Need'" - It's true: Tyler Kyte really did write and perform Spiederman's first solo record. It's also true that Alexz Johnson's dressing room is way nicer than his.
9. "Swing Kids" - For Jude's 18th birthday, she got just what she wanted. Namely, the Degrassi gym converted into a lush 1930s nightclub in less than three days.
10. "12:10 AM" - It's the middle of the night, but the day's not over. How can the cast rock out when they've been working for 17 hours? Also: hear the new Jude song "Unravelling".
11. "The Power to Rock"- You've got dozens of screaming fans and Alexz on stage. There's never any question who owns the room. See her break out the new Jude song "The Breakdown".
12. "Cory Sings" - Cory Lee is on stage singing her new track "No Shirt No Shoes", but nobody has any idea what else is going on.
13. "Time To Say Goodbye"- On the last day of the season, there are secret-goodbye messages, hugs, and a rooftop performance by Alexz Johnson.
