= Cory Lee =

Canadian singer-songwriter and actress

- Lee in September 2008

Background information
- Born: Cory Lee Urhahn
- Origin: Vancouver, British Columbia, Canada
- Genres: R&B, pop
- Occupations: Singer-songwriter, actress
- Years active: 2004–present
- Labels: Sextent Records (2004–2005); WIDEawake Entertainment Group Inc (2006–2008) The SMC Group (Universal Music) (2011–present)
- Website: corylee.net

Cory Lee (born as Cory Lee Urhahn) is a Canadian singer-songwriter and actress. She is most noted for playing the role of Karma in the television series Instant Star, and Miss Oh on Degrassi: The Next Generation.

== Early life ==
Born and raised in Vancouver, British Columbia, Canada to a Chinese mother and German father. She grew up immersed in a musical environment. She attended Lord Byng Secondary School. At age 15, Lee turned down an offer from Sony Hong Kong to join the short-lived girl group Ris-K. Eager to explore her Chinese roots and to see the world, in 2002, Lee joined another group called NRG performing in Hong Kong. When the SARS outbreak hit China, Lee returned home to focus on her solo career.

Lee aligned with Vancouver-based Hipjoint Production, and achieved "indy-cred" with her debut album What a Difference a Day Makes. Its flagship single "The Naughty Song" was initially released through the club scene, which, in addition to the Juno nomination, scored nominations for a 2006 Indie Music Award for Pop Artist of the Year and 2 Canadian Radio Music Awards.

She had a brief appearance in the MTV movie 2Ge+her, as a girl booing at the Spelling Bee show.

== Career ==
Initially, her music drew attention in clubs across Canada; radio soon followed with her first single "The Naughty Song", nominated for a Juno Award.

Her second album, Sinful Innocence, was released through WIDEawake/Universal on 15 May 2007. Featuring production from multi-platinum and three-time Juno Award winner Perry Alexander (Keshia Chante, Shawn Desman) and KUYA (Nelly, Ginuwine, MASE), Sinful Innocence enthusiastically explores society's "good girl/bad girl" double standard from Lee's own independent liberal perspective.

After releasing Sinful Innocence, Cory released a Remix Collection album, featuring hip-hop, reggaeton, and club remixes of "The Naughty Song", "Lover's Holiday", and "Ovaload".

In an update to her official website, Lee stated that she is in the studio working on a third album. On 19 April 2009, a new song surfaced on the internet called "Turn Me Off (Red Light)". The song, however, has yet to be confirmed as a single. The track was composed by Canadian producer KUYA, who Lee has previously worked with on her Sinful Innocence album.

Lee signed a global management deal with leading entertainment brand partnerships agency, The SMC Group. Group CEO Maurice Hamilton commented "We're extremely happy to have Cory Lee join our team; this year is going to be an important year for her and we're excited to be part of that process."

Cory partnered with high-end lingerie brand La Perla to host exclusive events across Asia.

In summer 2011 on iTunes Cory released single, "Best Shot,”a collaboration with Shaggy. Later, in November 2011, a remix of “Best Shot” was released, with a second song, “Fashion Show.” An accompanying music video was posted to YouTube from her official account.

In April 2012, she posted to YouTube a teaser for her new song – "Cruel Intentions". Two months later, a full-length music video was released. In July 2012, Cory released via digital download an extended-play album with both songs,Cruel Intentions,” and “Fashion Show. That album also included remixes of her last two songs. On 16 October, her third studio album was released via iTunes. It is titled Hot Pink Heart Part One. On the album are included her last two songs as well as 6 new songs.

On 11 March 2013, Cory posted on her official YouTube channel a song titled "Heart into Stone" and confirmed, that Hot Pink Heart – Part Two will be released later this year.

From 2019, Lee had a recurring role in the Hallmark Movies & Mysteries series of films The Matchmaker Mysteries.

== Discography ==
Studio albums:

- (2005) What a Difference a Day Makes
- (2007) Sinful Innocence
- (2012) Hot Pink Heart – Part One
- (2013) Hot Pink Heart – Part Two

EPs:

- (2012) Cruel Intentions & Fashion Show

Soundtracks:

- (2007) Songs from Instant Star 3
- (2008) Songs from Instant Star 4
- (2009) Instant Star: Greatest Hits

== Singles ==
- (2005) "The Naughty Song"
- (2005) "Goodbye"
- (2007) "No Shoes, No Shirt, No Service"
- (2007) "Ovaload"
- (2007) "Lovers Holiday"
- (2007) "Cold December"
- (2011) "Best Shot" (feat. Shaggy)
- (2011) "Fashion Show"
- (2012) "Cruel Intentions"
- (2013) "Bounce on It"

== Television work ==
- "Instant Star" (Karma, 2007–2008)
- "The Listener" (Marisa)
- "Being Erica" (Chantel)
- "The Chris Isaak Show" (Crazy Fan)
- "Ed's Nite In" (Herself)
- "Degrassi: The Next Generation" (Miss Oh, 2010–2014)
- "Rookie Blue"
- Designated Survivor, 2016

== Filmography ==
- Grand Theft Auto Girls (Detective Torres)
- Saw V (Jasmine)
- The Exorcism of Emily Rose (Umbrella Girl)
- Tilt (Katharine)
- Waterfall (Grocery Clerk)
- Scary Movie 4 (Concerned Citizen, Stunt Performer-At the Tripod scene)
- 2ge+her (Girl Booing at Spelling Bee)
- Books of Blood (Chelsea)
