= List of Degrassi: The Next Generation soundtracks =

This is a list of Degrassi: The Next Generation soundtracks.

| Season | Album | Release date |
|---|---|---|
| Season 4 | Songs from Degrassi: The Next Generation | 1 November 2005 |
| Season 5 | The N Soundtrack | 1 August 2006 |
| Season 7 | Music from Degrassi: The Next Generation | 2 December 2008 |
| Season 8 | Degrassi Goes Hollywood: Music from the Original Movie | 4 August 2009 |
| Season 9 | Degrassi Takes Manhattan: The Heat Is On | 13 July 2010 |
| Season 10 | Degrassi: The Boiling Point | 1 February 2011 |

== Songs from Degrassi: The Next Generation ==
Songs from Degrassi: The Next Generation

Soundtrack album by various artists
- Released: 1 November 2005
- Genre: Pop/Punk/Alternative Rock
- Length: 51:38
- Label: Orange Record Label

Degrassi chronology
| Songs from Degrassi: The Next Generation | The N Soundtrack |

Songs from Degrassi: The Next Generation is a soundtrack album from the television series Degrassi: The Next Generation. It was released as a digital download on 1 November 2005, following the fourth season, and as a CD on 8 January 2007.

| No. | Title | Artist | Length |
|---|---|---|---|
| 1. | "Degrassi: The Next Generation Theme" | Jakalope | 0:55 |
| 2. | "Heartbreaker" | Tuuli | 3:20 |
| 3. | "Beautifully Undone" | Lindy | 3:24 |
| 4. | "Midnite Rider" | Supergarage | 3:31 |
| 5. | "Secret Splendor" | Buck 65 | 5:02 |
| 6. | "Hard Road" | Sam Roberts | 4:07 |
| 7. | "Rooftop" | Melissa McClelland | 5:13 |
| 8. | "Suburbs" | Junior Achiever | 3:30 |
| 9. | "Feel It" | Jakalope | 3:56 |
| 10. | "I Don't Want to Be Me" | Amanda Clemens | 3:52 |
| 11. | "White Lightning" | The Premiums | 3:22 |
| 12. | "Down and Out" | Evren | 3:44 |
| 13. | "Just Jane" | Christopher Rouse | 4:30 |
| 14. | "Degrassi: The Next Generation Theme (extended version)" | The Degrassi Junior Strings | 3:12 |
| Total length: | | | 51:38 |

== The N Soundtrack ==
Released following the fifth season in 2006, The N Soundtrack contains songs from Degrassi: The Next Generation, including the first recording by Degrassi actor turned rapper Drake, and other shows airing on Noggin's teen programming block, The N.

== Music from Degrassi: The Next Generation ==
Music from Degrassi: The Next Generation

Soundtrack album by various artists
- Released: 2 December 2008
- Genre: Pop/Punk/Alternative Rock
- Length: 41:33 (Canada); 47:24 (US iTunes)
- Label: Sall Entertainment Group / Fontana North

Degrassi chronology
| The N Soundtrack | Music from Degrassi: The Next Generation | Degrassi Goes Hollywood: Music from the Original Movie |

Music from Degrassi: The Next Generation is a soundtrack album from the television series Degrassi: The Next Generation. It was released as a digital download on 2 December 2008, following the seventh season, and as a CD on 9 December 2008.

| No. | Title | Artist | Length |
|---|---|---|---|
| 1. | "Misery Business" | Paramore | 3:30 |
| 2. | "Face Down" | The Red Jumpsuit Apparatus | 3:09 |
| 3. | "Neighbors" | The Academy Is... | 3:09 |
| 4. | "All Time Lows" | Hellogoodbye | 2:44 |
| 5. | "Pocketful of Sunshine" | Natasha Bedingfield | 3:43 |
| 6. | "My Window" | Jake Epstein | 2:36 |
| 7. | "(Let's Get Movin') Into Action" | Skye Sweetnam | 3:41 |
| 8. | "More Than a Friend" | All Too Much | 4:20 |
| 9. | "How Long" | Army of Me | 3:34 |
| 10. | "Come One, Come All" | All Time Low | 3:32 |
| 11. | "Rock My Body" | The Higher | 3:31 |
| 12. | "Bodies and Words" | Silverstein | 3:13 |
| 13. | "Degrassi Theme Song" | Jakalope | 0:51 |

US iTunes Store bonus tracks
| No. | Title | Artist | Length |
|---|---|---|---|
| 14. | "Tell Me Lies" | Soundtrack & Melissa McIntyre | 1:11 |
| 15. | "Degrassi Theme (remix)" | Soundtrack & Jakalope | 4:40 |

== Degrassi Goes Hollywood: Music from the Original Movie ==
During the eighth season, in 2009, Degrassi Goes Hollywood: Music from the Original Movie was released to coincide with the Degrassi Goes Hollywood film.

== Degrassi Takes Manhattan: The Heat Is On ==
During the ninth season, in 2010, Degrassi Takes Manhattan: The Heat Is On (Music from the Original Movie) was released to coincide with the Degrassi Takes Manhattan film.

== Degrassi: The Boiling Point ==
Degrassi: The Boiling Point (Music from the Series)

Soundtrack album by various artists
- Released: 1 February 2011
- Genre: Pop/Alternative
- Length: 34:44
- Label: Sall Entertainment Group

Degrassi chronology
| Degrassi Takes Manhattan: The Heat Is On | Degrassi: The Boiling Point (Music from the Series) |

Degrassi: The Boiling Point (Music from the Series) (simply Degrassi: The Boiling Point in Canada) is a soundtrack album from the television series Degrassi. It was released as a digital download on 1 February 2011, following the first half of the tenth season, and as a CD on 22 February 2011.

| No. | Title | Artist | Length |
|---|---|---|---|
| 1. | "Balls" | Stefan Brogren, Melinda Shankar, & Spencer Van Wyck | 0:15 |
| 2. | "Believe" | Moneen | 3:30 |
| 3. | "One of Those Pregnant Teenagers" | Melinda Shankar & Jessica Tyler | 0:19 |
| 4. | "Mr. Perfect" | Jessica Tyler | 2:27 |
| 5. | "Concert of the Century" | Munro Chambers, Raymond Ablack, & Jordan Todosey | 0:17 |
| 6. | "Don't Say Love (Ralph Sall edit)" | All Too Much | 2:23 |
| 7. | "Stranger to Me" | Hannah Georgas | 3:06 |
| 8. | "I'm a Young Adult" | Raymond Ablack | 0:43 |
| 9. | "The Good Times" | Royalchord | 4:07 |
| 10. | "The Girlfriend Label" | Luke Bilyk & Melinda Shankar | 0:20 |
| 11. | "Hand to Hold" | Adaline | 2:53 |
| 12. | "That is Pandemic!" | Raymond Ablack & Charlotte Arnold | 0:12 |
| 13. | "Whitehorse" | Raymond Ablack & Jessica Tyler | 1:35 |
| 14. | "Scream at the Top of Your Lungs" | Munro Chambers & Aislinn Paul | 0:36 |
| 15. | "Carjack My Heart" | Dance Movie | 2:30 |
| 16. | "Just A Girl" | Jessica Tyler | 2:25 |
| 17. | "Last Night Was Epic!" | Munro Chambers, Jordan Todosey, & Raymond Ablack | 0:28 |
| 18. | "Paisley Jacket" | The Dead Hand | 3:01 |
| 19. | "Sammy Decter" | Eve and the Ocean | 3:27 |
| 20. | "Big Changes" | Stefan Brogren | 0:10 |
| Total length: | | | 34:44 |
