= Harris Institute of Music =

Institute in Tortonto, Canada

Coordinates: 43°39′14″N 79°22′10″W

Harris Institute
- Established: 1989; 37 years ago
- Founder: John Harris
- Location: Toronto, Canada
- Website: https://harrisinstitute.com/

Harris Institute for the Arts, also known as Harris Institute, is a higher education institution located in Toronto, Canada. It was founded by John Harris in 1989.

== History ==
The institute was founded by John Harris in 1989 in order to strengthen the music industry in Canada.

== Programs ==
- Audio-Production Program
- Arts-Management Program
