= Kyle Riabko =

Canadian actor and musician

- Born: 29 September 1987 (age 39); Saskatoon, Saskatchewan, Canada
- Genre: Pop rock
- Occupations: Musician, singer-songwriter, actor
- Instruments: Vocals, guitar, bass, piano
- Years active: 2001–present
- Labels: Okbair Ltd. Aware/Columbia Records (2003–2008)

Kyle Riabko (born 29 September 1987) is a Canadian musician, composer and actor from Saskatoon, Saskatchewan.

Before starring on Broadway in both Spring Awakening and Hair, Kyle released a full-length album of original music on Columbia Records, and spent his teen years touring as an opening act for a wide range of artists, including: B. B. King, James Brown, John Mayer, Keb Mo, Buddy Guy, Jason Mraz, and others.

== Career ==
=== Music career ===
Riabko has been performing since the age of 10. At age 12, he toured Eastern Canada as part of the band Bluesway Express. He began his international music career during his junior year of high school when he toured with John Mayer, Delta Goodrem, Buddy Guy, The Pussycat Dolls and Jason Mraz, among others. He was signed to Aware/Columbia Records in 2003 on a five-year contract.

==== Before I Speak ====
His full-length album Before I Speak was released 19 April 2005, just a few months before his high school graduation. He wrote each song on the album. Riabko played guitar and bass for the recording along with backing from former Prince drummer Michael Bland and former Grapes of Wrath keyboardist Vince Jones. Both Liz Phair and Robert Randolph appear on the album contributing guest vocals. John Mayer also has an uncredited assist with guitar arrangements, specifically on the song "Carry On". Before I Speak was co-produced by Riabko with Matt Wallace and Chris Burke-Gaffney.

Most of the album's recording took place at Sound City in Los Angeles. The tracks "Before I Speak" and "Doesn't Get Much Better" were recorded in Riabko's bedroom at his parents' home just prior to the completion of the album. Three singles were released from the album: "Carry On," "Do You Right" and "What Did I Get Myself Into."

Prior to the release of Before I Speak, a six-track EP was released which includes two songs that are not found on the full-length album: "Estrogen" and "I Don't Know."

==== Other releases and contributions ====
In March 2007, Riabko released The Duo EP: Volume 1, a six-track disc recorded with Dylan Hermiston featuring what Riabko describes as a "deeper, more experimental sound." On 15 September 2008 Kyle Riabko released The Parkdale Sessions Riabko's first full-length record released by Kyle's record label, Okbair Ltd. The album features 10 tracks, including two from his run in the Broadway show Spring Awakening.

In September 2007, he joined Stephen Kellogg and the Sixers on tour to replace Chris Soucy as second guitarist. Kyle Riabko and Boots Factor from Stephen Kellogg and the Sixers collaborated on a side project called Trevor Jackson, releasing a digital album. The duo released their second album in 2010.

In 2017, Roabko released the EP Holding My Breath.

=== Acting career ===
==== 2008–2011: Spring Awakening and Hair ====
Riabko replaced Jonathan Groff in the Broadway production of the musical Spring Awakening, in the lead role of Melchior Gabor, on 23 May 2008. He left the Broadway production to join the national tour on 2 August 2008. After reprising the role on the national tour, he left the production on 28 June 2009. The 2009 television documentary Kyle Riabko: The Lead, by filmmaker Jeff Newman, follows Riabko from Toronto to New York City as he takes on the lead in Spring Awakening.

Riabko replaced Gavin Creel as Claude in the 2009 Tony Award Winning Musical Revival of Hair. Performances began 9 March 2010. Riabko signed a one-year contract with the Broadway company of Hair.

Riabko also had roles film and television roles including a recurring role in 90210 and Instant Star.

==== 2013–2016: What's It All About? Bacharach Reimagined ====
In 2013, Riabko starred in What's It All About? Bacharach Reimagined at the New York Theatre Workshop. What's It All About? was directed by choreographer Steven Hoggett and featured Riabko's arrangements of the music of Burt Bacharach. Burt Bacharach attended the opening night of the show in NYC and both openings in London and said, "Kyle has done something truly unique with my music. He's a beautiful singer and one hell of a guitar player."

Riabko subsequently brought the production to London, first to The Menier Chocolate Factory, and then to The Criterion Theatre in the West End as Close To You: Bacharach Reimagined. In the summer of 2016, Ghostlight Records released The Original London Cast Recording of Close To You: Bacharach Reimagined. Riabko followed the album release with solo concert performances of Bacharach Reimagined in New York City, Los Angeles, and his hometown of Saskatoon in Canada.

In 2019, Riabko has a two-episode guest role in the Netflix series Soundtrack.

== Personal life ==
Riabko married Irish actress and singer Stephanie McKeon on 6 December 2017, having met through Bacharach Reimagined. In February 2023, the couple announced they were expecting their first child. Their son was born that July.

== Discography ==
=== Albums ===
- The EP (2004)
- Before I Speak (2005)
- The Duo EP: Volume One (2007)
- Song for Amanda: The EP (2008, digital only)
- The Parkdale Sessions (2008)

=== Singles ===
- "Carry On" (2004)

== Filmography ==
- Kyle Riabko: The Lead – a BravoCA documentary about Spring Awakening
- Instant Star (TV) (2008)
- Chicago Blues Reunion: Buried Alive in the Blues
- 90210 (TV) (2010–2011) 9 episodes – Ian
- Rising Stars (2010)
- Cinema Verite (2011) – Jackie Curtis (Film)
- Bench Seat (2012) – John (short film based on a segment in Neil LaBute's play Autobahn)
- Soundtrack (TV series) (2019) – Levi

== Stage ==
- Spring Awakening (2008)
- Hair (2010)
- What's It All About? – Bacharach Reimagined (2014)
