= Alexz Johnson =

Canadian actress and musician (born 1986)

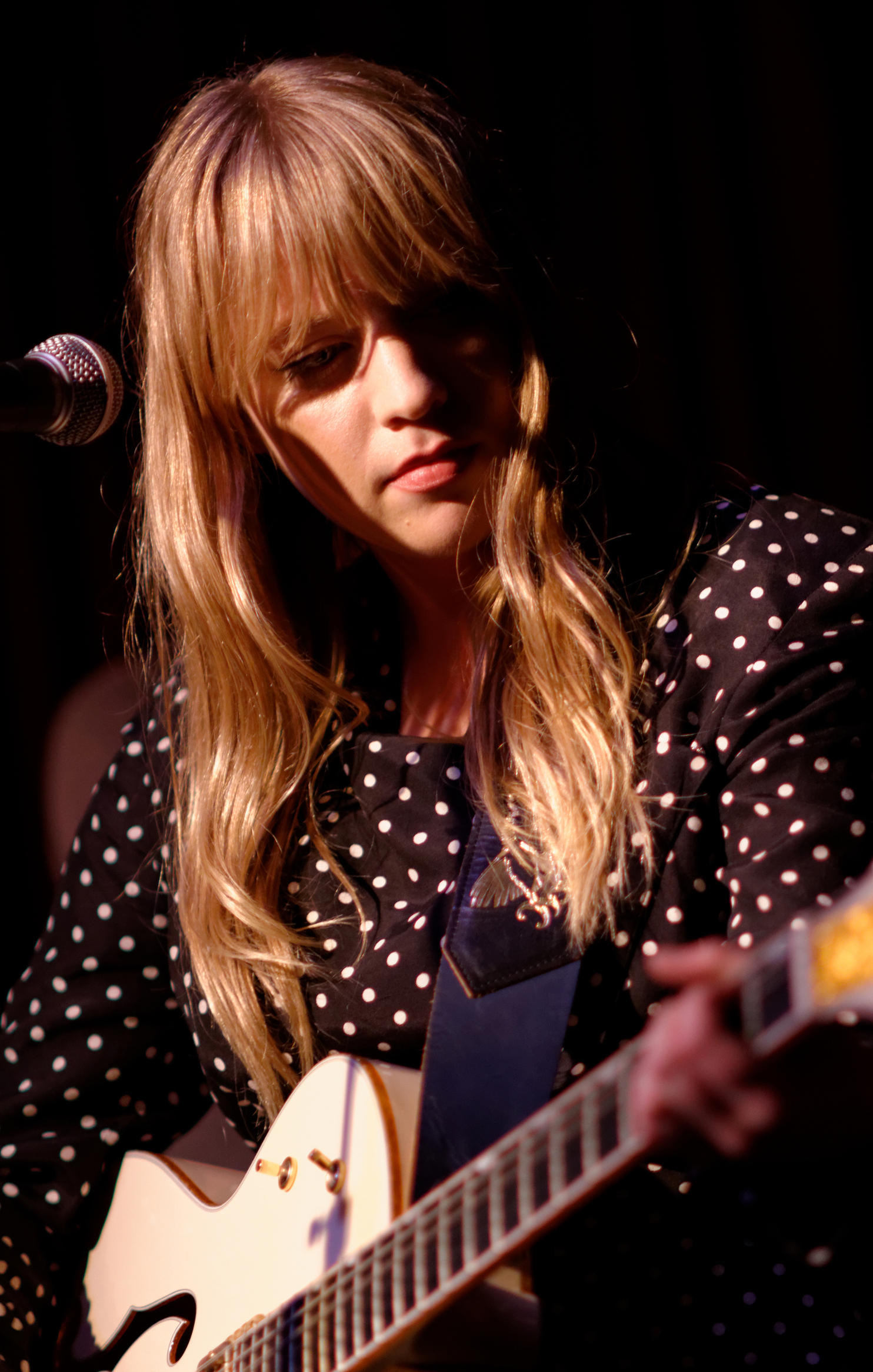
- Johnson in 2015
- Born: Alexzandra Spencer Johnson; November 4, 1986 (age 40); New Westminster, British Columbia, Canada
- Occupations: Actress; singer; songwriter; musician
- Years active: 1997–present
- Musical career
- Genres: Pop; world
- Instrument: Vocals
- Labels: Capitol; Epic; inDiscover; Orange Lounge; Laydee Spencer
- Website: alexzjohnson.com

Alexzandra Spencer Johnson (born November 4, 1986) is a Canadian actress, singer, songwriter, and musician. Known for her distinctive sound since her debut in 2010, her first album, Voodoo, was independently released with her brother, Brendan Johnson. Over the years, she has released several albums and EPs, including: The Basement Recordings series (2011–2013), Skipping Stone (2012) and her sophomore album Let 'Em Eat Cake (2014). She continued to evolve with subsequent albums A Stranger Time (2017), Still Alive (2020) and Seasons (2023).

Johnson is best known for her roles as Jude Harrison in the CTV series Instant Star, as Annie Thelen in the Disney Channel series So Weird, and as Erin Ulmer in the 2006 horror film Final Destination 3. She additionally guest starred as Saturn Girl, a member of the Legion of Super-Heroes, in the series Smallville. She was nominated three times for a Gemini Award for Best Performance in a Children's or Youth Program or Series (Instant Star), winning the award in 2008.

== Early life ==
Johnson was born in New Westminster, British Columbia, and raised in nearby Coquitlam. She is of Swedish, Scottish, and English descent. The sixth of ten children, Johnson says her family embraced the arts and being creative. One brother is an actor and screenwriter, another brother does graphic design, her younger brother performs music, and her brother Brendan is a singer-songwriter and music producer with whom she often collaborates.

From age three, Johnson often sang for her large extended family. By age six, she was receiving vocal training, participating in festivals with her local youth choir by age seven, and giving solo performances at school and community functions. At age nine, she had entered the P.N.E. talent search, becoming a finalist. She participated in many talent contests and festivals, winning a National Anthem Contest at the age of 11, with her rendition of the Canadian National Anthem, "O Canada", heard on national television. This resulted in radio and television interviews, as well as interest from management. That year, she was voted Best Anthem singer of the season by the Vancouver Sun.

Locally, Johnson was often referred to as the "West Coast Celine" and sang the Canadian National Anthem at games for the NHL's Vancouver Canucks and the NBA's Vancouver Grizzlies. She performed at charity events and fairs around the province, in addition to the BC Summer Games recording their theme song, "Reach for the Stars". She went on to appear on the Variety Club show singing a duet with Bob McGrath, sang the first set of songs at the Molson Indy (a major car race), and entertained on New Year's Eve at Planet Hollywood at the age of 12.

== Career ==
=== 1997–2003: So Weird ===
Although Johnson was only focused on a music career at the time, she decided to pursue a career in acting at the age of 11, where she "walked into an acting agency and told them [she] wanted to sing". She landed auditions for commercials and a television pilot entitled "Most Talented Kids". in 1999.

Johnson auditioned for the Disney Channel original series So Weird, which was casting for a lead actress who could also sing for the final season of the show. At the age of 13, Johnson replaced the lead character in the Disney Channel series So Weird for the show's final season. Johnson portrayed the lead role of Annie Thelen, which combined her acting and musical talents. The role featured her singing alongside Mackenzie Phillips. She showed an interest in songwriting, co-writing one of the songs for the show.

On July 22, 2000, Johnson was featured in Billboard for the first time, she went on to be featured in sixteen different issues. Her highest ranking was number two in "The Top 10 Favorite Artist Picks" for "The Most Popular New Talent on Broadband Talent Net" as of June 2, 2001, after 33 weeks on. Her co-write from Disney’s So Weird, "Dream About You" charted six different times and came in at number one in "Radio Play Favorite Song Requests" for "The Most Listened-to New Tracks on Broadband Talent Net" on November 11, 2000. Her cover of Canadian girl group Prestige’s song, "Wishing Star" retitled as "Wishing On A Star", came in at number five in the same issue. Also "Sunshine Reigns", an early credited co-write with songwriters Trevan Wong and Doris Young, charted at number three on July 22, 2000.

In the year 2000, a song performed by Johnson entitled "Everything (Feels Like New)" was featured in the Disney Channel Original Movie The Other Me, starring Andrew Lawrence. She promoted the project by performing a few verses in an impromptu a capella that aired on Disney Channel during her Express Yourself interview feature that was highly circulated during commercial breaks at the time. A low quality demo of the song leaked in full online. However, a full studio version of the song was never released.

After the cancellation of So Weird, Johnson continued her interest in songwriting, co-writing with her brother Brendan Johnson. Several labels offered her contracts, but she held off, wanting more creative control and a hand in the songwriting. In 2001, Johnson teamed up with the production/songwriting team of Johnny Elkins and CJ Vanston. Her song "Transparent Lies", was recorded for a compilation album titled Fill Your Head. The album was compiled featuring several different artists with songs using certain words in order to help students with their SAT scores. Though it was initially released as a physical and digital compilation album, the physical is no longer in print, but a low quality digital copy can still be purchased for download from the original official website. Her work with Vanston and Elkins featured a more bubblegum pop sound than what she preferred and ended around 2003. Johnson continued to work with her brother Brendan recording their own music. These were the songs included on the demo CD sent to the executives of Instant Star with her audition tape.

In 2019 in an interview with The So Weird Podcast, Johnson confirmed that her So Weird and Cold Squad co-star Belinda Metz played a key role in her landing the role of Jude Harrison in Instant Star. Select scenes from their original audition tape were released as part of the bonus features on the Instant Star, Season 1 DVD boxset.

=== 2004–2007: Instant Star and Final Destination ===
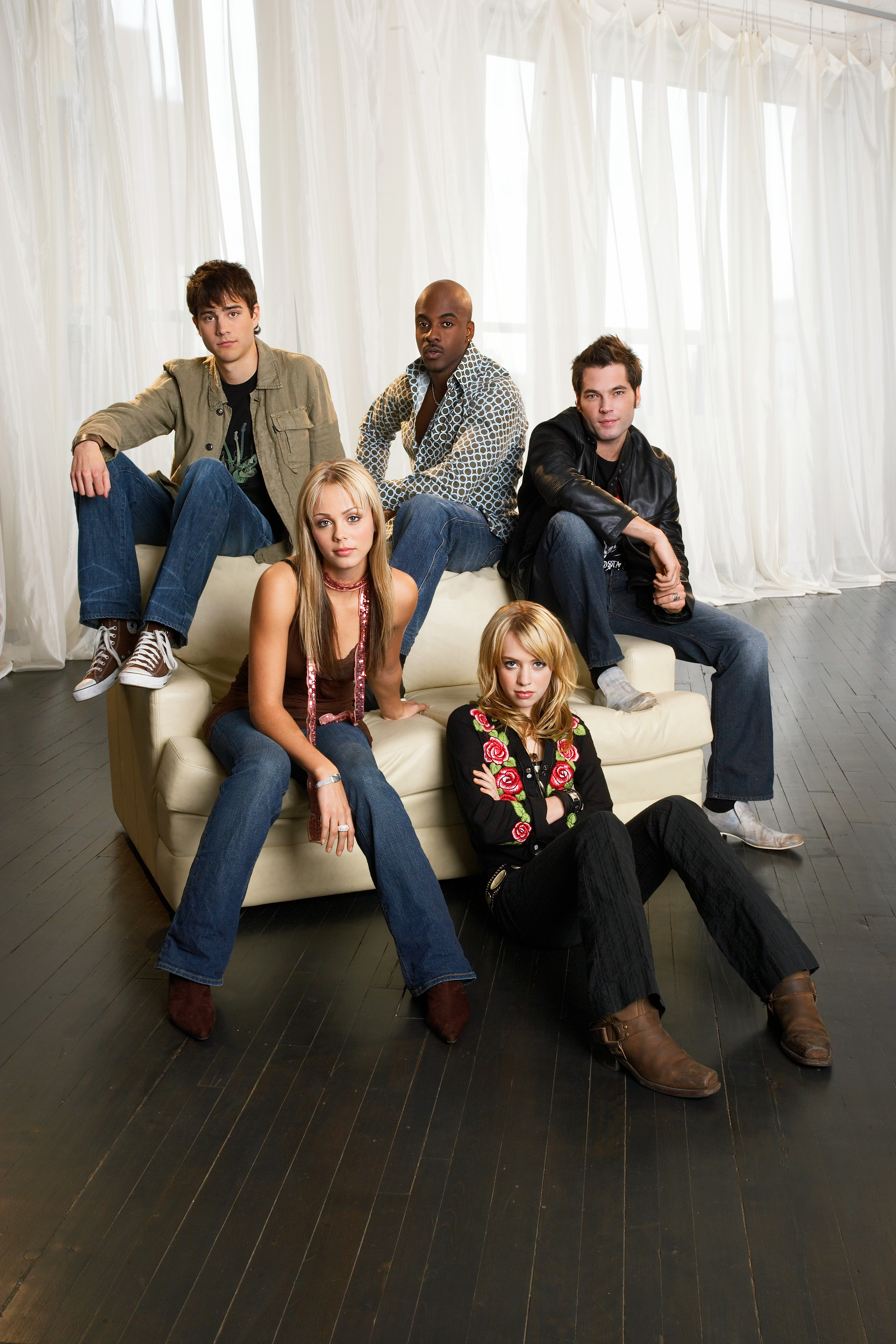
Johnson with other members of the Instant Star cast

Throughout 2004, Johnson made various appearances on Canadian television series including The Chris Isaak Show, The Collector, and Cold Squad where she performed two original songs as twins Dierdre and Tricia Spence. Her Disney’s So Weird co-star Belinda Metz also plays both of her character’s mother. Years later, Tricia Spence’s swan song “Eight Days” was unofficially given to fans and posted online after much petition.

In February 2004, Johnson sent in an audition tape to the producers of Degrassi: The Next Generation for their upcoming show Instant Star. They were specifically looking for a Canadian teen actress/vocalist to play the lead role, Jude Harrison. The first audition tape Executive Producer Stephen Stohn received was Johnson's via Canadian Singer-songwriter and actress Belinda Metz, and he was convinced she was perfect for the role. After its first season, Instant Star was nominated for three Gemini Awards (the Canadian equivalent of the American Emmy Award) in the category of Best Children's or Youth Fiction Program or Series, including a nomination for Best Performance (Alexz Johnson). On August 28, 2007, the show received three more Gemini Award nominations, in the category of Best Children's or Youth Program or Series, including another for Best Performance (Alexz Johnson, in the episode, "I Fought the Law").

Johnson sang all of the songs that her character Jude, on Instant Star performed on the show. She recorded soundtracks for each of the four seasons of Instant Star: Songs from Instant Star, Songs from Instant Star Two, Songs from Instant Star Three, and Songs From Instant Star Four. She co-wrote five of the songs on the first season's soundtrack, including "24 Hours", "Let Me Fall", "Criminal, "Skin", and "That Girl", which Johnson had written before when she was fourteen. She also co-wrote "Frozen" & "Shatter Me", both of which were featured in the show but were never considered for the soundtrack.

In 2005 she made guest appearances in the made-for-TV films Reefer Madness: The Movie Musical, with her vocals included in the ensemble on the release of the film's official promo disk and soundtrack releases. As well as Lifetime's original film Selling Innocence, released July 2, 2005.

Most of the original recordings for her originally planned debut album were written by Johnson in early 2005, but she had yet to find a major label to help create and release the songs. In early 2006, Johnson announced she was leaving the indie Canadian label Orange Records that released the first two soundtracks to Instant Star, in search of something to showcase her as an artist and not her fictional counterpart, Jude Harrison.

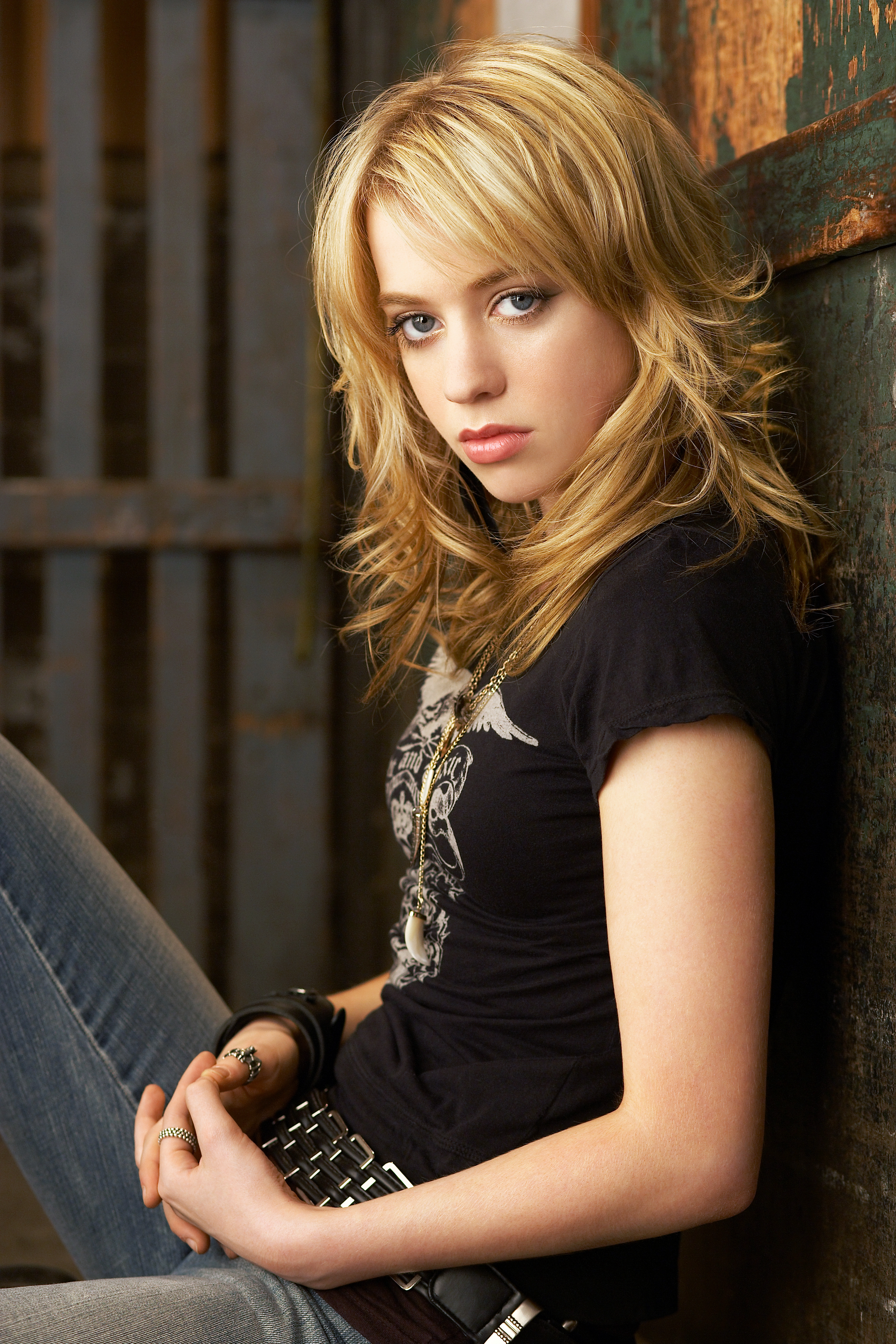
Johnson c. 2005

Johnson auditioned for the role of Julie Christensen in the thriller Final Destination 3. She showed up at the audition in an all-black, punk rockish outfit, later claiming that she was in a bad mood. The casting directors concluded she was a better fit for the role of Erin Ulmer, a character with a bad attitude. Her performance attracted praise from some critics, including one (writing for The Philadelphia Inquirer) who said: "The characters are so loathsome, you're glad to see them go. Except for two: the goth couple Ian (Kris Lemche) and Erin (Alexz Johnson). He's a cynical know-it-all, like Dennis Miller with black fingernails; she's like Parker Posey with raccoon mascara.." In 2007, Johnson starred in the Lifetime film Devil's Diary, for which she received a Leo Award nomination, in the category of Best Lead Performance by a Female in a Feature-Length Drama.

=== 2008–2009: Major label debut album ===
On August 26, 2008, Johnson was nominated a third time for a Gemini award. On October 21, 2008, she won the Gemini Award for Best Performance in a Children's or Youth Program or Series, for the Instant Star episode "Let It Be". Johnson continued with Instant Star for four seasons, and expected to return for a fifth. This was interrupted when CTV and The N both pulled funding following the fourth season, which led to the cancellation of the series. This allowed Johnson to go back to focusing on her music.

After a showcase in New York City, Johnson met with several labels and producers and chose Capitol Records, which allowed her to work with Paul Buckmaster, though her brother was the main producer of the material at the time. In writing songs for the album, she worked with UK writers Martin Terefe and Sacha Skarbek as well as producer/songwriter Brio Taliaferro. On June 25, 2007, Johnson appeared on MTV Canada. She confirmed that all of her songs had been written and recorded. She planned on shopping for a label over the next few months and hoped to release the album in the winter.

On February 15, 2008, she announced that she had signed a record deal with label Epic Records (part of the Sony BMG group), expecting the album to be released in the fall. Having heard the first six songs, Stephen Stohn, in his MySpace blog of February 16, 2008, commented that, "they are just incredibly good – very different from the songs you've come to know through Instant Star, much more rhythmic, with almost a world beat." In an interview in 2008, she described her upcoming album as "pop with eclectic world rhythms and influences", citing influences from "older artists" such as Paul Simon, Kate Bush, and Annie Lennox, and saying that she was "trying to find a way to make those great older songs younger".

The producer for the album became Greg Wells after Johnson was introduced to him through his brother Rob Wells, one of the songwriters for Instant Star. The new arrangement with Epic Records also affected the line-up of artists for the Instant Star 4 soundtrack, as the record label allowed her a maximum of four songs on Instant Star 4. In her MySpace blog of February 15, 2008, Johnson indicated that she was planning an extensive tour around her new album, saying of her songs that, "I can't wait to perform them live! Looking forward to seeing all of your faces!" Johnson also began working with multi-instrumentalist Luis Conte and legendary strings expert Paul Buckmaster. Five songs were posted on her MySpace page by her record company on June 11, 2008. These songs were supposed to appear in her upcoming album and were entitled: "Easy", "Swallowed", "Chicago", "Golden", and "Running With the Devil".

Johnson appeared in the hit CW series Smallville episode "Legion", as the superheroine Saturn Girl. The episode aired on January 15, 2009. She was the second actress from Instant Star to appear in the show, the first one being Laura Vandervoort. She also appeared in the TV-film version of the Lois Duncan novel Stranger With My Face, in which she plays twin sisters who were separated at birth. She stated that the filming—which included a dramatic scene in which her two characters conflict through astral projection, leading to a fall off a cliff and into a waterfall—was so mentally and physically demanding, that she felt like she could never take on another role like it again. It premiered on Lifetime on August 29, 2009. The director of Stranger With My Face, Jeff Renfroe, greatly praised what he saw when working with Johnson and her costar Andrew Francis.

Before the album's release date, Epic Records removed Johnson from their Artist Lists. Johnson later gave clarification on her website that launched August 11, 2009, saying "Epic has released over a third of their artists from their contracts and, la dee da... I'm one of those artists..." She also later clarified in an interview that the "head of the label who signed [her] ended up shifting to a different company. It led a lot of artists on Epic astray." She confirmed that due to losing her deal with Epic, she would be releasing a different album independently with her brother Brendan producing. She said she hopes that her unreleased debut album with Epic would see the light one day, noting that for now, the songs are still tied up in the arrangement with Epic.

=== 2010–2011: Voodoo, Reloaded and The Basement Recordings ===
The independent release will be by the company which also runs her website – Laydee Spencer Music, Inc. Johnson released a list of songs that are going to be on her album in alphabetical order, and later requested fans to go through the clips of five upcoming songs on her site, and to recommend which should be the lead-off single. The tracks posted were: "L.A. Made Me", "Hurricane Girl", "Voodoo", "A Little Bit", and "Trip Around the World". It was announced that her debut album Voodoo would be released on March 30, 2010. The debut single, Trip Around The World, was released on February 2, 2010, along with a music video shot by Michael Maxxis. Johnson shared in an interview that her favourite songs of Voodoo are "Look at Those Eyes", "Voodoo", and "Gonna Get It".

Johnson informed her fans through her Twitter account and her official website that all the songs from Voodoo would be remixed by the Demolition Crew due to lack of airplay. The Demolition Crew undertook to make the songs more radio-friendly. She later released her remix album Reloaded, it was released on April 26, 2011. The first single, "Boogie Love" (The Demolition Crew Remix), was released on January 10, 2011, while the second one, "Look at Those Eyes" (The Demolition Crew Remix), was released on March 29, 2011.

She became a trending topic on Twitter for four days, due to the ABC Family television series Pretty Little Liars, playing "Time to Be Your 21", a song performed by Johnson in the series Instant Star, in the season finale. While trending on Twitter, she garnered attention from Demi Lovato and Nelly Furtado. Lovato has spoken several times about Johnson being her inspiration to start a career in music, while Furtado spoke about her single "Look at Those Eyes" calling it "an event". With the help of the Twitter trend, Johnson made the homepage of several online sites, including L.A. Times Ministry of Gossip Blog.

Johnson created a YouTube account where she posts videos of herself performing along with her brother Brendan James Johnson, and Jimmy Robbins. On June 22, 2011, Johnson held two live concerts on Stage It for fans around the world. The concerts were performed online via webcam. Though many of her songs had already been featured in several episodes. In June 2011 it was announced that Johnson would sing on the opening theme song of the television series Degrassi: The Next Generation Season 11. The idea came naturally as Demacio "Demo" Castellón was producing the track and asked her if she would contribute to it.

She revealed that she is writing for her next album and hoping to enter the studio by the end of the Summer to start recording. Johnson and her brother, Brendan Johnson, released a digital album of some of her previously unreleased demo's entitled, The Basement Recordings, on August 26, 2011. The sequel to the 2011 demo album The Basement Recordings, named The Basement Recordings II was released on May 1, 2012. On February 22, 2013, Johnson and her brother Brendan released the third installment in the series, The Basement Recordings III.

=== 2012–2016: Skipping Stone, Heart and Let 'Em Eat Cake ===
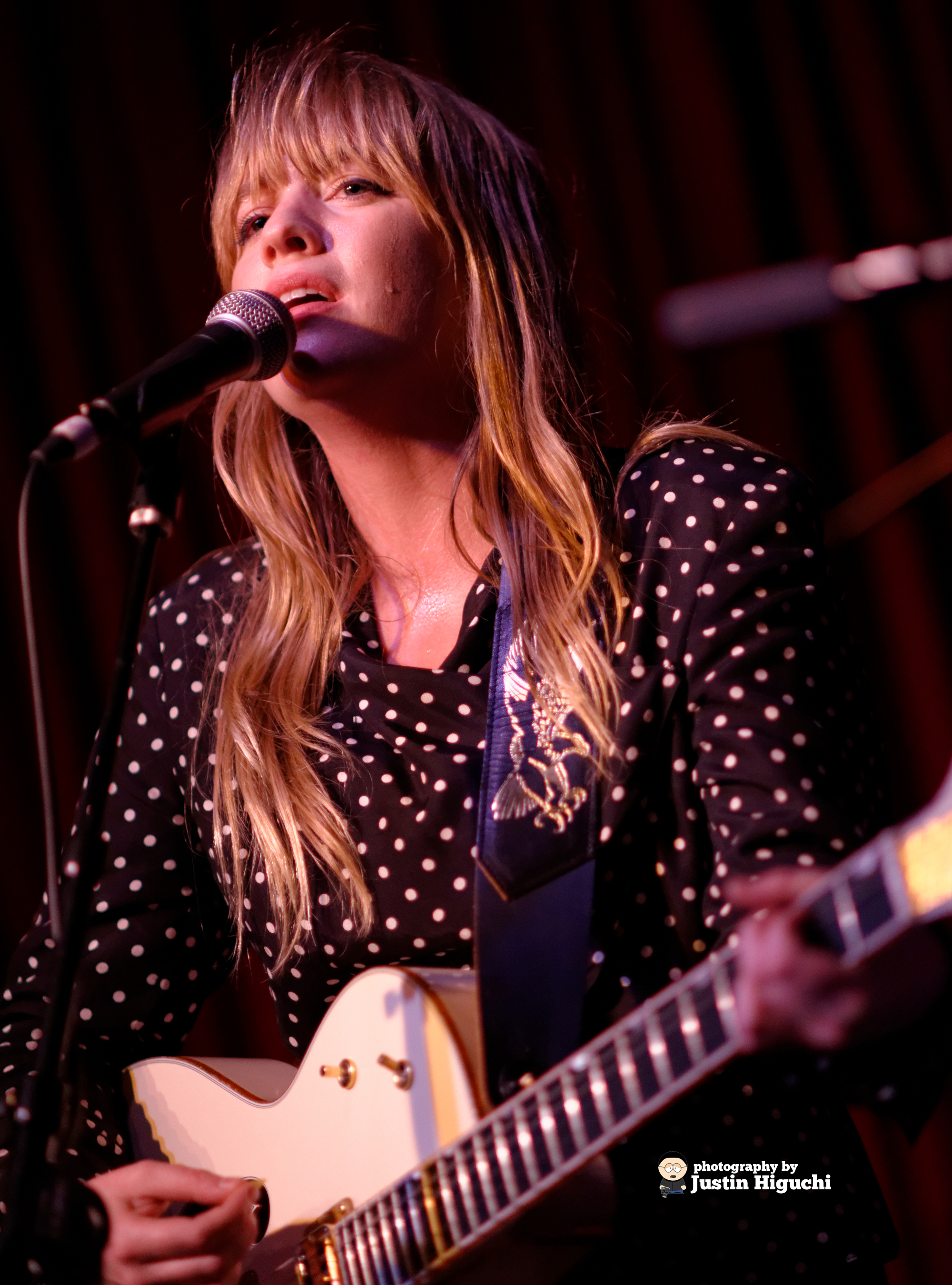
Johnson performing in 2015

Johnson announced her plans to release an EP featuring new material, and confirmed on October 29 that she was in New York filming the music video for her new single "Skipping Stone". She also confirmed that it would originally be a digital release, and following her Kickstarters Campaign, a physical release would follow. The video for "Skipping Stone" was released in December. Skipping Stone was released on January 24, 2012, that same day she launched a Kickstarter Campaign in order to raise funds for her upcoming U.S. tour. She set her goal for $30,000 in 60 days. For different money denominations, Johnson offered prizes. Examples included digital downloads of Skipping Stone, signed T-shirts and CDs, signed scripts, clothing from Instant Star, concert tickets, personalized emails phone calls, live performances, dinner and a broadway show, etc. Johnson unexpectedly reached her goal within 24 hours, confirming her ability to tour during the summer of 2012. Johnson reached $50,000 on day three, allowing her the opportunity to expand the tour and travel overseas. All money donated goes toward touring, recording, merchandise, and anything music related. On October 26, 2012, Johnson released a trailer for The Skipping Stone Tour Documentary which chronicles her summer on tour. Johnson released a live album, Live From The Skipping Stone Tour, a documentary, and a photo book containing photos from The Skipping Stone Tour on December 4, 2012.

Alexz revealed she had begun working on Heart in 2012. She worked with Bleu, Boots Ottestad, Wax Ltd, Jamie Hartman, Theo Katzman, and her brother Brendan James Johnson on writing the Extended-Play. Johnson later announced that she would collaborate with her fans in funding her next studio project through PledgeMusic.com. According to the site, Johnson has managed to gather 156% of the money needed for the production and release of her second album. Johnson launched a joint North American tour with Charlene Kaye, Misty Boyce, and Jay Stolar in the spring of 2013. On Christmas Day of 2013, she released the lead single from Heart, titled "American Dreamer", initially only to fans who had already donated, and pledged. The single was released publicly on January 10, 2014. On January 29, 2014, Johnson released the Extended-Play Heart, initially to pledgers only. It includes "American Dreamer" as well as three other tracks. While the EP was originally intended to be an album sampler, she clarified in an interview that the EP will stand on its own, and that the EP will feature only new tracks. Johnson was part of a European tour in support of the EP in early 2014, opening for Ron Pope and Wakey!Wakey!. Johnson was also the opening act for MAX on a North American tour.

Pledgers received digital copies of Johnson's sophomore album Let 'Em Eat Cake one week before the official release date of October 14, 2014. Alexz embarked on a tour in support of the album from October until December of the same year. Jared & The Mill and Patrick Droney joined her as special guests. From February to March 2015, Johnson had a five-week residency at The Hotel Cafe in Hollywood, CA. The song "Let 'Em Eat Cake" was featured in an episode of South of Hell starring Mena Suvari. The episode aired on November 27, 2015, on WE tv.

Johnson collaborated with Bleu on the project Johnson & McAuley. They released a self-titled EP in 2016. The duo released their first music video for "Illuminated Dream" on January 19, 2017.

On May 24, 2016, Johnson made her directorial debut with "Weekend" a music video for the band Dress Black. June 27, 2017, a second video for Dress Black's song "Single File Girl" was released also directed by Johnson.

=== 2017–present: A Stranger Time, Still Alive and Seasons ===
She began working on her third studio album, with Mark Howard producing the record. "Right Now" was released as the lead single from her third studio album on July 4, 2017. The studio album A Stranger Time was officially released on September 1, 2017, it is a nine track studio album. A music video for "Right Now" premiered on Johnson's YouTube channel on her birthday, November 4, 2017. The album is accompanied by multiple music video's, and a behind the scenes video of making the album. On March 9, 2018, she released her second live album titled Live from A Stranger Time.

In late 2019, she announced, via her official Instagram account, an upcoming fourth studio album. The singles "Weight" and "Running with the Devil", as well as a short documentary, The Longer Road, preceded the release of the album. Still Alive was released on May 8, 2020.

On March 16, 2023, Alexz Johnson released a new track titled “Ain’t That The Way” from her fifth studio album Seasons released on April 7, 2023.

== Influences and musical style ==
I love interesting voices. I love Rickie Lee Jones, I think she's an amazing lyricist and songwriter. Annie Lennox is a strong woman and she wasn't afraid to be really eccentric and who she was. It's nice to see singers that find sensuality and sexuality and femininity and all those key words, I feel like it's nice to have that, not so obvious, it's nice when it comes from a different place, and I feel like it's important that that is out there as well in the music industry.

— Johnson, In an interview with Fearless Radio, November 4, 2014.

Alexz Johnson could be seen in 2001 during her episode with Disney Channel's Express Yourself citing Celine Dion, Whitney Houston, Mariah Carey, and Sarah McLachlan as vocal influences. She states: "Women who just write their own music and sing what they feel, it just really inspires me."

Johnson was quoted saying, "I love pop music, but kind of eclectic, creative pop." She has said her influences include Kate Bush, Peter Gabriel, Paul Simon, and Annie Lennox. She is also an admirer of Jason Mraz, The Civil Wars, and Sara Bareilles.

Roy Orbison, Elvis Presley, Billy Joel and Carole King have all influenced her writing growing up.

== Philanthropy ==
During 2001, Johnson worked with World Vision, and had a section on her official site where fans could order shirts with a design done by Johnson and featuring her autograph. There were production problems and the shirts were never sent out. Johnson made an apology on her site and provided refunds to everyone who ordered one. In 2002, she performed as the opening act at Wayne Gretzky's celebrity dinner and auction, held in Edmonton, Alberta, to raise funds for the Ronald McDonald children's charity. Also in 2001 she performed, and visited the Nashville Kids Fair, she also hosted the event. During her time in Nashville, Johnson visited ill children in a local hospital. The trip was made as a part of an outreach program by Disney Channel, and Johnson visited children, with the dog who starred in the Disney original film Air Bud.

In 2002, Johnson shared the stage with David Foster, Michael Bublé, and Ed McMahon at a David Foster Foundation fundraiser. During 2002 and 2003, Johnson focused on her music, and decided to perform with several charitable organizations. She worked with David Foster, opening for his charity events for the David Foster Foundation. After the season premiere of the second season of Instant Star on The N she also did a public service announcement for Second Harvest, which had been assisting victims of Hurricane Katrina.

On November 21, 2008, Johnson was a special guest performer for a Women in Leadership (a Vancouver organization promoting women's role in the media) foundation called SuperWomen & Friends—A Red Carpet Gala.

In 2021 Johnson teamed up with Cameo.com, in which fans can purchase personal request videos, announcing that partial proceeds will benefit the Canadian Cancer Society.

== Filmography ==
Film
Year	Title	Role	Notes
2006	Final Destination 3	Erin Ulmer	
2013	House of Bodies	Kelli	
2017	The Wasting	Grace	Also co-producer

Television
Year	Title	Role	Notes
2000–2001	So Weird	Annie Thelen	26 episodes
2001	Express Yourself	Herself	Interstitial series
2004	The Chris Isaak Show	Jennifer	Episode: "Taking Off"
2004	The Collector	Isabelle Van Sant	Episode: "The Ice Skater"
2004	Cold Squad	Deirdre Spence / Tricia Spence	Episode: "Teen Angel"
2004–2008	Instant Star	Jude Harrison	52 episodes
2005	Reefer Madness	The Arc-ettes / Vocal Ensemble	Television film
2005	Selling Innocence	Angel DeSousa	Television film
2006	Degrassi: Minis	Jude Harrison	Episode: "I'm a Degrassi, I'm an Instant Star"
2007	Devil's Diary	Dominique	Television film
2009	Smallville	Imra Ardeen / Saturn Girl	Episode: "Legion"
2009	Stranger with My Face	Laurie Stratton / Lia Abbot	Television film
2011	The Listener	Marissa Patterson / Hack Grrl	Episode: "Jericho"
2011	Haven	Moira Keegan	Episode: "Roots"
2014	Blue	Satya	4 episodes

As producer
Year	Title	Credited as	Notes
2012	Walking	Producer	Her own music video
2016	The Dishwasher	Producer	Short film
2017	The Wasting	Co-producer	Also actress
2017	Single File Girl	Co-producer	Dress Black music video; Also director

As Director
Year	Title	Credited as	Notes
2016	Weekend	Director	Dress Black music video
2017	Single File Girl	Director	Dress Black music video
2020	Still Alive	Director	Her own music video

== Discography ==
=== Studio albums ===
- Voodoo (2010)
- Let 'Em Eat Cake (2014)
- A Stranger Time (2017)
- Still Alive (2020)
- Seasons (2023)
- Salvage (2025)

=== Demo albums ===
- The Basement Recordings (2011)
- The Basement Recordings II (2012)
- The Basement Recordings III (2013)

=== Remix albums ===
- Reloaded (2011)

=== Live albums ===
- Live from the Skipping Stone Tour (2012)
- Live from A Stranger Time (2018)
- Live in Bristol (2022) [available through Patreon subscription only]
- Seasons Live from Los Angeles (2024) [available from Patreon store only]

=== Extended plays ===
- Skipping Stone (2012)
- Heart (2014)
- Songs From Blue Season 3 (2014)
- Johnson & McAuley (as part of Johnson & McAuley) (2016)
- The Dishwasher (Original Short Film Soundtrack) (2016)

=== Soundtrack albums ===
- Songs from Instant Star (2005)
- Songs from Instant Star Two (2006)
- Songs from Instant Star 3 (2007)
- Songs from Instant Star 4 (2008)
- Instant Star: Greatest Hits (2009)

== Awards and nominations ==
Year	Award	Category	Nominated work	Result
2001	Young Artist Awards	"Best Ensemble in a TV Series (Drama or Comedy)" (shared with cast)	So Weird	Nominated
2005	Gemini Awards	"Best Performance in a Children's or Youth Program or Series"	Instant Star	Nominated
2007	Gemini Awards	"Best Performance in a Children's or Youth Program or Series"	Instant Star	Nominated
2008	Leo Awards	"Best Lead Performance by a Female in a Feature Length Drama"	Devil's Diary	Nominated
2008	Gemini Awards	"Best Performance in a Children's or Youth Program or Series"	Instant Star	Won
2016	Storyhive Awards	"Storyhive Digital Shorts – British Columbia"	The Dishwasher	Won
2016	Best Shorts Competition	"Film Short"	The Dishwasher	Won
2016	Kerry Film Festival	"Best Original Score" (shared with Matthew Chung and Marko Koumoulas)	The Dishwasher	Nominated
2016	Independent Music Awards	"Best Pop Album"	Let 'Em Eat Cake	Nominated
2017	21st Annual USA Songwriting Competition	"Songwriting Competition" (shared with Bleu)	Thank You For Breaking My Heart	Nominated
2017	Leo Awards	"Best Musical Score in a Short Drama" (shared with Matthew Chung and Marko Koumoulas)	The Dishwasher	Nominated
2020	UnsignedOnly Music Competition	"Vocal Performance"	Still Alive	Won
