= Instant Star =

Canadian television series

- Genre: Teen drama; Musical
- Created by: Linda Schuyler
- Starring: Alexz Johnson; Kristopher Turner; Tim Rozon; Laura Vandervoort
- Theme music composer: Jody Colero; Jim McGrath; Stephen Stohn
- Country of origin: Canada
- Original language: English
- No. of seasons: 4
- No. of episodes: 52 (list of episodes)

Production
- Executive producers: Linda Schuyler; Stephen Stohn
- Producer: Stephen Stohn
- Production locations: Toronto, Ontario, Canada
- Production company: Epitome Pictures

Original release
- Network: CTV (Canada); Noggin (The N block; U.S.)
- Release: September 15, 2004 – July 28, 2008

Instant Star is a Canadian musical teen drama television series which aired from 15 September 2004 to 26 June 2008. The series stars Alexz Johnson as teenage singing competition winner Jude Harrison. The show chronicles Harrison's experience in the recording industry whilst focusing on character development.

Instant Star was created by Linda Schuyler, who also co-created Degrassi. In Canada, the show aired on CTV. In the United States, it aired on Noggin as part of its teen-oriented block, The N. Epitome Pictures produced the show, and both CTV and The N were involved in the production and financing.

Four seasons of the show (each with 13 episodes) were made. CTV and The N both pulled funding following the fourth season, despite plans by Epitome Pictures to continue with a fifth season. The fourth and final season ended on June 26, 2008, in the United States.

== Overview ==
In each episode of the show, Jude Harrison balances challenges with both her musical career and personal life. For instance, she faces challenges in her romantic relationships while recording with G-Major Records because her relationships and music influence each other. Likewise, she excels when she collaborates to create and perform music. There are also other events relating to her personal and social spheres in addition to her music and romantic interests.

== Episodes ==
| Season | Episodes | Originally released | | |
| Season | Episodes | First released | Last released | Network |
|---|---|---|---|---|
| 1 | 13 | September 15, 2004 | April 24, 2005 | CTV |
| 2 | 13 | February 10, 2006 | May 12, 2006 | The N |
| 3 | 13 | February 16, 2007 | May 18, 2007 | The N |
| 4 | 13 | June 2, 2008 | July 28, 2008 | The N |

== Cast ==
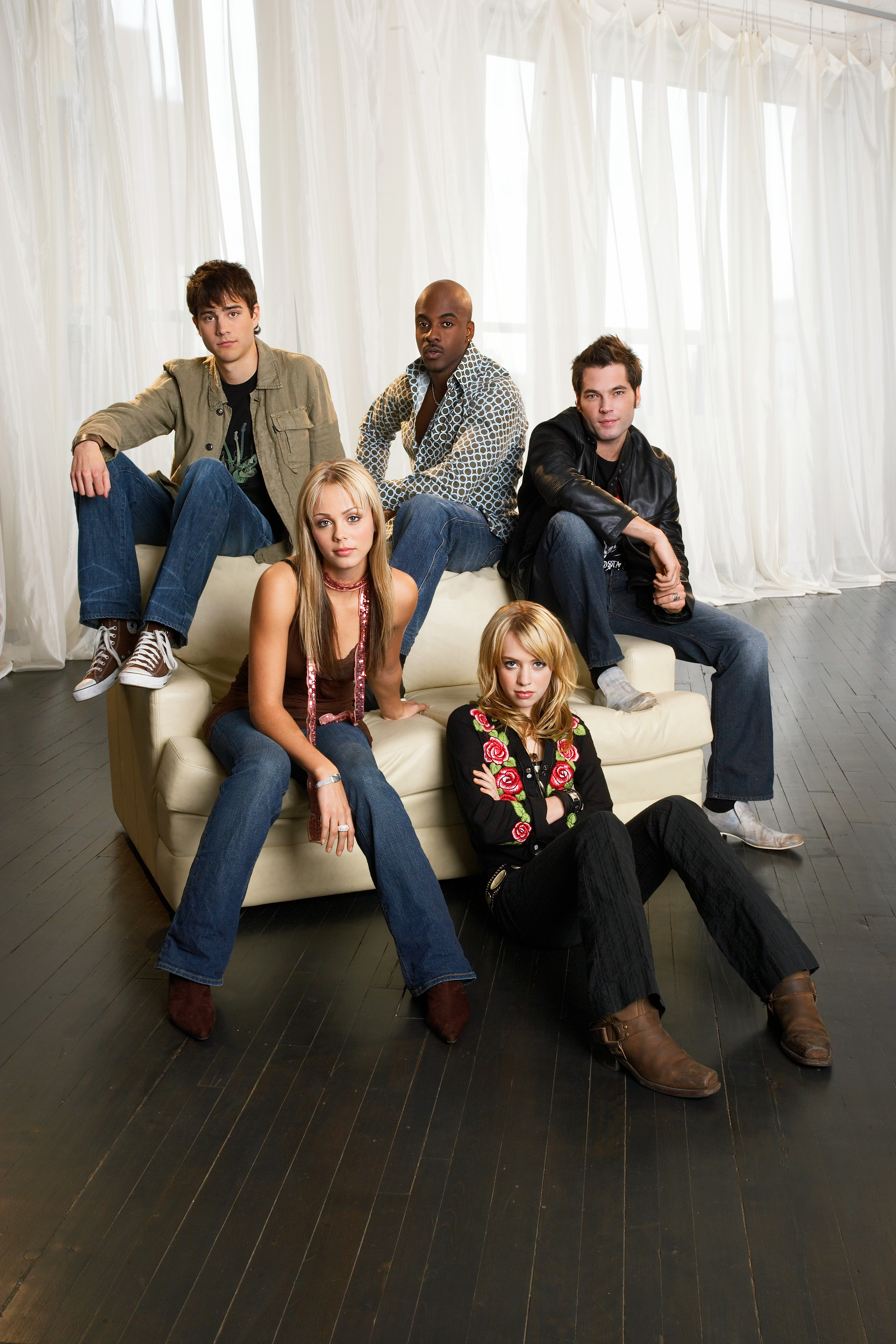
Cast photo – Instant Star (Credit to Epitome Pictures)

=== Main ===
- Alexz Johnson as Jude Harrison
- Kristopher Turner as James "Jamie" Andrews
- Tim Rozon as Thomas "Tommy" Quincy
- Laura Vandervoort as Sadie Harrison
- Barbara Mamabolo as Katrina "Kat" Benton (season 1; recurring, season 2)
- Tracy Waterhouse as Georgia Bevans (season 1)
- Matthew Brown as Shay Mills (season 1)
- Andrea Lui as EJ Li (season 1)
- Wes Williams as Darius Mills
- Tyler Kyte as Vincent "Spied" Spiederman (recurring, season 1; main, seasons 2–4)
- Cory Lee as Karma (seasons 3–4)
- Zoie Palmer as Patsy Sewer (recurring, season 2; main season 3)
- Mark Taylor as Kwest (recurring, seasons 1–2; main, seasons 3–4)
- Christopher Gaudet as Wally Robbins (recurring, seasons 1–2; main, seasons 3–4)
- Ian Blackwood as Kyle Bateman (recurring, season 2; main, seasons 3–4)
- Craig Warnock as Paegan Smith (season 4)
- Tatiana Maslany as Zeppelin (season 4)
- Cassie Steele as Blu (season 4)
- Kyle Riabko as Milo Keegan (season 4)

=== Recurring ===
- Katrina Matthews as Eden Taylor (season 1)
- Simon Reynolds as Stuart Harrison

=== Supporting ===
Supporting cast
| Season | Actor | Character |
|---|---|---|
1
| 1 | Jane Sowerby | Victoria Harrison |
| 1 | Miku Graham | Portia Mills |
2
| 2 | Jane Sowerby | Victoria Harrison |
| 2 | Miku Graham | Portia Mills |
| 2 | Nicholas Rose | Mason Fox |
| 2 | Vincent Walsh | Liam Fenway |
3
| 3 | Miku Graham | Portia Mills |
4
| 4 | Kristin Fairlie | Megan |

=== Guest stars ===
Guest stars
| Actor | Character | Season | Episode number | Episode name |
|---|---|---|---|---|
| Stacey Farber | Herself | 2 | 8 | Personality Crisis |
| Drake | Himself | 2 | 8 | Personality Crisis |
| Christopher Ralph | Chaz Blackburn | 1 | 11 | All Apologies |
| Christopher Ralph | Chaz Blackburn | 2 | 5 | Viciousness |
| Corey Sevier | Hunter | 3 | 8 | 18 Part 1 |
| Corey Sevier | Hunter | 3 | 10 | Nowhere To Run |
| Corey Sevier | Hunter | 3 | 11 | Celebrity Skin |
| Jordan Todosey | Helen | 2 | 10 | Problem Child |
| John Ralston | Don | 2 | 4 | Miss World |
| John Ralston | Don | 2 | 5 | Viciousness |
| John Ralston | Don | 2 | 7 | Stranger In The House |
| John Ralston | Don | 2 | 11 | Mother's Little Helper |
| Shawn Singleton | T-Bone | 1 | 5 | You Can't Always Get What You Want |
| Shawn Singleton | T-Bone | 1 | 7 | I Wanna Be Your Boyfriend |
| Shawn Singleton | T-Bone | 2 | 2 | No Sleep 'Til Brooklyn: Part 2 |

=== The Instant Stars ===
Instant Stars
| Season | Winner | Runner-up |
|---|---|---|
| 1 | Jude Harrison | Eden Taylor |
| 2 | Mason Fox | |
| 3 | Karma | Bobby |
| 4 | Milo Keegan | Kadijah |

== Music ==
Other article: Instant Star soundtracks

Each episode of the series features a new song performed by Alexz Johnson. Usually, the song is about something that occurs in the episode. However, in some episodes, there is no direct explanation to the lyrics; sometimes it's just a song. Some episodes can feature more than one song, but there is only one song per episode that is to be featured on the soundtrack for that season. For instance, there are 13 episodes per season, which means there are 13 main songs. One of the songs, "Perfect," was written by Canadian synth pop artist Lights.

Alexz Johnson recorded the vocals on the first and second soundtracks, while even co-writing some of the songs with her brother Brendan. For the third and fourth soundtracks, Alexz wasn't featured for all of the songs because of the release of her debut album and conflicts with prior record labels.

Just before the broadcast of the second season on The N, viewers had a chance to see Alexz Johnson in concert in a show called Instant Star: Backstage Pass, singing two of the songs from each season of the show and accompanied by her band from the show, Spiederman Mind Explosion.

== Broadcast ==
Instant Star was broadcast in over 120 countries.

Coverage
| Country | Broadcaster |
|---|---|
| Australia | Nickelodeon |
| Austria | ORF |
| Belgium | Ketnet |
| Brazil | Multishow, Boomerang |
| Bosnia and Herzegovina | FTV |
| Bulgaria | NovaTV |
| Canada | CTV |
| Canada | MuchMusic |
| Croatia | RTL Kockica |
| Estonia | TV3 |
| Finland | Sub |
| France | FillesTV |
| France | Virgin 17 |
| Germany | VIVA |
| Hungary | Viasat3 |
| Israel | Arutz HaYeladim |
| Italy | Italia 1 |
| Latvia | TV3 |
| Lithuania | Tango TV |
| Malaysia | 8TV |
| Mexico | MTV Latin America; Canal 4TV; Boomerang; Televisa Regional |
| Morocco | 2M TV |
| New Zealand | TV2 |
| Norway | TVNorge |
| Peru | Boomerang Latin America |
| Poland | ZigZap |
| Portugal | MTV Portugal |
| Romania | TVR 2 |
| Russia | MTV Russia |
| Serbia | RTS 2 |
| South Africa | GO |
| Spain | MTV Spain, 8Neox |
| Sweden: | TV2 |
| United Kingdom: | Nickelodeon |
| USA: | Noggin (The N block), Primo TV |
| Ukraine: | K1 |
| Venezuela | Televen |
| Vietnam | HTV3 |

== Home releases ==
Funimation Entertainment released the first two seasons on DVD in Region 1 in 2007.

Echo Bridge Home Entertainment acquired the rights to the series in 2010 and subsequently released the final two seasons on DVD, available in the US only.

| DVD name | Ep# | Release date |
|---|---|---|
| Season One | 13 | May 22, 2007 |
| Season Two | 13 | December 4, 2007 |
| Seasons One and Two | 26 | April 7, 2009 |
| Season Three | 13 | January 19, 2010 |
| Season Four | 13 | July 27, 2010 |

== Reception ==
In 2005, after its first season, Instant Star was nominated for three Gemini Awards in the category of Best Children's or Youth Fiction Program or Series. Nominations included: (1) Best Series; (2) Best Performance (Alexz Johnson); and (3) Best Direction (Graeme Campbell). The show won the award for Best Direction for the episode You Can't Always Get What You Want.

On August 28, 2007, the show received three more Gemini Award nominations in the category of Best Children's or Youth Program or series. Alexz Johnson was again nominated for Best Performance (for the episode, "I Fought the Law"), and there were two more nominations for Best Direction - Graeme Campbell (for "I Fought the Law"), and Pat Williams (for "Personality Crisis").
