= List of programs broadcast by Up TV =

The following is a list of programs broadcast by Up TV, an independently owned family-oriented cable and satellite television network, featuring a mix of secular and religious programming.

== Up TV Premiere Movies ==
=== 2022 ===
Movie	Starring	Original airdate
Love in Wolf Creek	Nola Martin and Tim Rozon	October 16, 2022
Star-Crossed Romance	Aliyah O'Brien and Andrew Zachar	October 23, 2022
Squeaky Clean Mysteries: Hazardous Duty	Jessica Blackmore and Jamie Roy	October 30, 2022
Unperfect Christmas Wish	Alys Crocker and David Pinard	November 4, 2022
Christmas in the Pines	Jillian Murray and Dean Geyer	November 5, 2022
Christmas Masquerade	Erin Agostino and David Lafontaine	November 6, 2022
The Christmas Retreat	Rhiannon Fish and Clayton James	November 11, 2022
A Tiny Home Christmas	Rebecca Dalton and Christopher Seivright	November 12, 2022
The Picture of Christmas	Chelsea Hobbs and Giles Panton	November 13, 2022
The Holiday Swap	Julius Cho and Vanessa Jackson	November 19, 2022
Christmas Lucky Charm	Sugenja Sri and Adrian Spencer	November 20, 2022
Christmas in the Wilds	Kaitlyn Leeb and Victor Zinck Jr.	December 2, 2022
Christmas on the Slopes	Soma Chhaya and Olivier Renaud	December 3, 2022
Christmas on the Rocks	Lyla Porter-Follows and Jon McLaren	December 4, 2022
Santa Switch	Ethan Erickson and Anne Dudek	December 9, 2022
A Royal Christmas Match	Jordana Largy and Matthew MacCaull	December 10, 2022
Santa’s Got Style	Franco Lo Presti and Kathryn Davis	December 11, 2022
Sappy Holiday	Vanessa Sears and Jon McLaren	December 17, 2022
An Eclectic Christmas	Hannah Galway and Jeremy Walmsley	December 18, 2022
The Snowball Effect	Anjali Khurana and Landon Moss	December 24, 2022
Christmas in Wolf Creek	Nola Martin and Tim Rozon	December 25, 2022

=== 2023 ===
Movie	Starring	Original airdate
The Princess and the Bodyguard	Ryan Bruce and Emily Alatalo	January 15, 2023
The Clue to Love	Rachel Bles and Travis Milne	January 22, 2023
Finding Love in San Antonio	Valentina Izarra and George Akram	January 29, 2023
The Happy Camper	Daniela Bobadilla and Beau Wirick	February 5, 2023
Luckless in Love	Paniz Zade and Brett Donahue	February 12, 2023
Mixed Baggage	Leanne Lapp and Spencer Lord	February 19, 2023
Sweet on You	Haylie Duff and Rob Mayes	February 26, 2023
Something's Brewing	Jason Cook and Kristi Murdock	March 5, 2023
God Bless the Broken Road	Lindsay Pulsipher and Matthew Derek Davis	March 19, 2023
The Confession Musical	Caitlin Borek and Geoffrey Davin	March 26, 2023
Southern Gospel	Max Ehrich and Katelyn Nacon	April 9, 2023
When Love Blooms	Sarah Power and Thomas Cadrot	May 14, 2023
Just Jake	Brittany Bristow and Rob Mayes	May 21, 2023
Lucky Hearts	Alex Trumble and Margie Mays	May 28, 2023
The Wedding Wish	Kabby Borders and Alex Trumble	June 4, 2023
Written in the Stars	Kimberley Crossman and David de Lautour	June 11, 2023
The Secret Sauce	Tori Anderson and Corey Sevier	June 18, 2023
Adeline	John Schneider and Erin Bethea	October 1, 2023
Sweet As Maple Syrup	Brooke Nevin and Carlo Marks	October 8, 2023
The Cowboy and the Movie Star	Mackenzie Porter and Toby Levins	October 15, 2023
Country Hearts	Lanie McAuley and Chris Jericho	October 22, 2023
Love at the Lodge	Megan Elizabeth Barker and Marc Herrmann	October 29, 2023
We’re Scrooged	Tamara Duarte and Andrew Bushell	November 5, 2023
Christmas Time Capsule	Franco Lo Presti and Emily Alatalo	November 12, 2023
Country Hearts Christmas	Chris Jericho and Lanie McAuley	November 19, 2023
Mistletoe Connection	Jessica Sipos and Markian Tarasiuk	November 26, 2023
Home for the Holidays: A Christmas Homecoming	Bill Gaither and Gloria Gaither	December 2, 2023
Yuletide the Knot	Mary Antonini and Peter Porte	December 3, 2023
Christmas at an Amish Bakery	Alexandra Harris and Sean Koetting	December 10, 2023
Dial S For Santa	Sarah Dugdale and Julian Haig	December 17, 2023
A Christmas Letter	Colin Mochrie and Glenda Bragzana	December 24, 2023

=== 2024 ===
Movie	Starring	Original airdate
Romantic Friction	Julie Roy and Brandon Santana	January 7, 2024
Love on Retreat	Ansley Gordon and Jonathan Stoddard	January 14, 2024
The Love Advisor	Rachel Vallori and Tyler Harlow	January 21, 2024
My Perfect Romance	Kimberly-Sue Murray and Christopher Russell	January 28, 2024
Baked With a Kiss	Jonathan Stoddard and Ansley Gordon	February 4, 2024
Love By Design	Jackie Moore and Joey Lawrence	February 11, 2024
Romance in Hawaii	Kelley Jakle and Cedric Jonathan	February 18, 2024
The Soulmate Search	Alexandra Harris and Jonathan Stoddard	February 25, 2024
The Single's Guidebook	Meggan Kaiser and Philip Boyd	March 3, 2024
A Royal Makeover	Veronica Long and Ricky Martinez	March 10, 2024
Sweetly Salted	Lanie McAuley and William Martinez	March 17, 2024
Writing A Love Song	Nina Kiri and Connor McMahon	March 31, 2024
May The Best Wedding Win	Alys Crocker and Cody Ray Thompson	June 2, 2024
The Wedding Rule	Julie Nolke and Dennis Andres	June 9, 2024
A Match for the Prince	Paniz Zade and Jamie Thomas King	June 16, 2024
Discovering Love	Liliana Tandon and Tim Rogan	June 23, 2024
Sweet Surrender	Adam Mayfield and Arielle Kebbel	September 15, 2024
Snapshot of Love	Lexi Giovagnoli and Benedict Mazurek	October 6, 2024
Return to Sender	Maddy Hillis and Markian Tarasiuk	October 27, 2024
Country Roads Christmas	Lanie McAuley and Bo Yokely	November 3, 2024
The Case of the Christmas Diamond	William Baldwin and Kelly Daly	November 9, 2024
Christmas in Rockwell	Trish Stratus and Stephen Huszar	November 10, 2024
Dognapped: Hound for the Holidays	Sara Ball and Noah Fearnley	November 16, 2024
A Very English Christmas	Poppy Gilbert and Lewis Griffiths	November 17, 2024
The Search for Secret Santa	Skye Coyne and Alex Trumble	November 23, 2024
Festival of Trees	Kate Miner and Greg Perrow	November 24, 2024
Christmas Catch	Emily Alatalo and Franco Lo Presti	November 28, 2024
A Prince and Pauper Christmas	Brittany Underwood and Jonathan Stoddard	November 30, 2024
A Bluegrass Christmas	Amanda Jordan and David Pinard	December 1, 2024
A Christmas Thief	Michelle Borth and Jarrid Masse	December 7, 2024
12 Dares of Christmas	Brittany Underwood and Sean Yves Lessard	December 8, 2024
A Holiday Hideout	Arielle Kebbel and Colin Egglesfield	December 14, 2024
A Novel Christmas	Brigitte Kingsley and Landy Cannon	December 15, 2024
A Country Music Christmas	Alexandra Harris and Jonathan Stoddard	December 21, 2024
North by North Pole: A Dial S Mystery	Abby Ross and Joey Scarpellino	December 22, 2024

=== 2025 ===
Movie	Starring	Original airdate
A Very Country Wedding	Greyston Holt and Bea Santos	March 1, 2025
Sugarcreek Amish Mysteries: Blessings in Disguise	Galadriel Stineman and Todd Terry	April 20, 2025
The Love Club Moms: Tory's Storybook Romance	Ashley Newbrough and Ryan Bruce	April 27, 2025
The Love Club Moms: Jo's School Crush	Rebecca Dalton and Corey Sevier	May 4, 2025
The Love Club Moms: Harper's Campaign Chemistry	Genelle Williams and Mark Taylor	May 11, 2025
The Love Club Moms: Nila's Cafe Connection	Nazneen Contractor and Joseph Cannata	May 18, 2025
A Bestselling Kind of Love	Ashley Newbrough and Jason Diaz	May 25, 2025
Mr. Pawsitively Perfect	Christine L. Nguyen and Amie Spilchuk	June 1, 2025
The Wedding Contest	Nikki McKenzie and Giles Panton	June 8, 2025
Two Chefs and a Wedding Cake	Francesca Bianchi and Matt Hamilton	June 15, 2025
A Wedding for Belle	Ella Cannon and Jason Tobias	June 22, 2025
Technically Yours	Kristi Murdock and Tom Gipson	June 29, 2025
Heartstrings Attached	Morgan Bradley and Chris Connell	October 5, 2025
A Country Encore	Amanda Jordan and Connor McMahon	October 12, 2025
Five Date Rule	Janelle Arthur and Jason Burkey	October 19, 2025
See You Again	Brey Noelle and Rob LaColla Jr.	October 26, 2025
The Great Christmas Snow-In	Amanda Fuller and Joey Lawrence	November 2, 2025
A Soldier for Christmas	Renay Rayes and Joe Barra	November 8, 2025
A Royal Christmas Manor	Brianna Cohen and Kirk Barker	November 9, 2025
Christmas in Paris	Rebecca Dalton and Karl E. Landler	November 15, 2025
Saving Christmas Spirit	Ashley Newbrough and James Robinson	November 15, 2025
Saving the Christmas Ranch	Brianna Cohen and Jonathan Stoddard	November 16, 2025
A Royal Christmas Hope	Jenna Michno and Robert Adamson	November 23, 2025
A Christmas Wish in Hudson	Alex Rinehart and Rib Hillis	November 29, 2025
Christmas in Amish Country	Ella Cannon and Jason Tobias	November 30, 2025
Annie Claus is Coming to Town	Maria Thayer and Sam Page	November 30, 2025
A Christmas Recipe for Romance	Madeline Leon and Sebastian Sacco	December 6, 2025
A Cape Cod Christmas	Katie Leclerc and Brent Bailey	December 7, 2025
A Christmas Village	Madeline Leon and Neil Paterson	December 7, 2025
A Christmas Murder Mystery	Jamie Bernadette and Morgan Bradley	December 7, 2025
A Grandpa for Christmas	Ernest Borgnine and Katherine Helmond	December 14, 2025
Christmas in Big Sky Country	Rebecca Dalton and Olivier Renaud	December 14, 2025
Meet the Santas	Steve Guttenberg and Crystal Bernard	December 15, 2025
The Best Thing About Christmas	Megan Alexander and Scott Ditty	December 20, 2025
Christmas with the Knightlys	Celeste Desjardins and Joe Scarpellino	December 21, 2025
The Christmas Paegant	Melissa Gilbert and Robert Mailhouse	December 22, 2025
A Christmas Visitor	William Devane and Meredith Baxter	December 22, 2025
Christmas Wedding Runaway	Sara Mitich and Harmon Walsh	December 23, 2025
A Perfect Christmas Pairing	Ansley Gordon and Chris Connell	December 23, 2025

=== 2026 ===
Movie	Starring	Original airdate
Where the Wind Blows	Trevor Donovan and Ashley Elaine	April 5, 2026
Snowbody Like You	Kelley Jakle and Colton Little	November 5, 2026
Chocolate for Christmas	Angela Cole and Joel Berg	November 6, 2026
A Royal Christmas Stables	Kathryn Davis and Franco Lo Presti	November 12, 2026
Christmas En Pointe	Jonathan Stoddard and Lexie Contursi	November 19, 2026
The Christmas Gift Guide	Nazneen Contractor and Morgan David Jones	December 3, 2026
Christmas in the Ballroom	Kym Johnson Herjavec and Gilles Marini	December 4, 2026
Christmas Cookie Caper: A Puzzle Time Mystery	Vivica A. Fox and Morgan Bradley	December 10, 2026
The Christmas Treehouse	Kristi Murdock and Thomas Maden	December 17, 2026

== Current programming ==
=== Original programming ===
Note: Titles are listed in alphabetical order followed by the year of debut in parentheses.

==== Drama ====
- Mystic (2022)
- The Wedding Planners (2022)
- Hudson & Rex (2024)
- The Sunshine Murders (Note: Co-production with Channel 5) (2025)
- Sugarcreek Amish Mysteries (2026)
- Blue Skies (2026)

==== Reality television ====
- Crazy Beautiful Weddings (2018)
- Expecting (2018)
- Our Wedding Story (2018)
- Design Twins (2019)
- Small Town Christmas (2021)

=== Syndicated programming ===
==== Drama ====
- Heartland (2010)
- Hudson & Rex (2023)
- The Rookie (2025)
- The Waltons (2026)

==== Comedy ====
- Reba (2019)
- Last Man Standing (2023)

==== Religious programming ====
- In Touch with Dr. Charles Stanley
- Jesus Calling
- Your Move with Andy Stanley

== Former programming ==
=== Original programming ===
==== Dramas ====
- Ties That Bind (2015)
- Date My Dad (2017)

==== Reality/Unscripted ====
- Jo Frost: Nanny On Tour (2016)
- Growing Up McGhee (2016)
- Small Town, Big Mayor (2017)
- Morgan Family Strong (2018)
- Up in the Morning
- UP Music Mornings
- Uplifting Christmas
- Uplifting Country
- Uplifting Pop

=== Syndicated programming ===
==== Dramas ====
- 7th Heaven (July 4, 2012 – October 7, 2014; December 2014; 2015 – 2019)
- 800 Words (2020–21)
- Blue Bloods (July 4, 2022 – June 29, 2026)
- The Chosen (2020–2023)
- Dr. Quinn, Medicine Woman (2015–2017)
- Gilmore Girls (October 4, 2015–2023)
- Gilmore Girls: A Year in the Life (2020–2023)
- Highway to Heaven (May 3, 2010–2014; 2022–23)
- JAG (2026)
- The Librarians (2018–2021)
- Lincoln Heights (2016)
- Little House on the Prairie (2019–2022)
- Parenthood (September 28, 2015 – December 28, 2018)
- Touched by an Angel (September 15, 2012–2016)
- Walker, Texas Ranger (2023–2025)
- Wild at Heart (2023)

==== Comedies ====
- 227 (September 27, 2010 – November 30, 2014)
- Amen (2010–12)
- America's Funniest Home Videos (April 9, 2016 – December 31, 2019)
- The American Bible Challenge (September 30, 2013 – September 27, 2015)
- The Bernie Mac Show (January 2 – 18, 2019)
- Candid Camera (2010–11)
- Cosby (2010–11)
- Ed (December 28, 2015 – September 25, 2016)
- Everybody Hates Chris (December 30, 2013 – September 24, 2017)
- Family Ties (October 1, 2012 – September 25, 2016)
- The Flip Wilson Show (December 28, 2015 - November 27, 2016)
- Fresh Off the Boat (September 1, 2018–19)
- Gimme a Break! (2010-2016)
- Growing Pains (December 29, 2014 – September 24, 2017)
- Home Improvement (2018–2021)
- The Mary Tyler Moore Show (September 22, 2025 – July 6, 2026)
- Moesha (October 1, 2012 – September 25, 2016)
- My Two Dads (December 26, 2016 - September 24, 2017)
- The Parkers (December 1, 2014 – September 24, 2017)
- Sister, Sister (2009–16)
- Smart Guy (September 30, 2013 – September 28, 2014)
- Steve Harvey (September 29, 2014 – November 29, 2015)
- Whose Line is it Anyway? (2017–2022)

==== Children's programming ====
- VeggieTales (2009)

==== Reality shows ====
- Supernanny (2014–2020)
- Nanny 911 (2017)
- One Born Every Minute (2018)
- World's Craziest Fools (2017)
- Wonderama (2019)
- Don't Forget the Lyrics (2012-2013)
- Soul Train (aired one episode twice on August 1, 2010)
- Family Feud (2019)
- The Drew Barrymore Show (2023)

==== Religious programming ====
- Andy Stanley's One Simple Truth
- David Jeremiah
- Dove Awards
- Espiritu Latino
- Faith and Fame
- Four: Southern Gospel's Best
- Front Row Live
- Gaither Gospel Hour
- Hometown Gospel
- Leading the Way
- Midnight Gospel Hour
- One Voice Worship
- Revealed
- Rock Block
- Soulful Voices
- Stellar Awards
- Time of Grace
- Top 10 Music Video Countdown
- Wake Up Call
