= Katherine Davis =

Katherine Davis may refer to:

- Katherine Kennicott Davis (1892–1980), American composer, pianist, and author of "The Little Drummer Boy"
- Kathy Davis (born 1956), lieutenant governor of Indiana
- Kathy Davis (sociologist), American sociologist
- Katharine Bement Davis (1860–1935), American progressive era social reformer and criminologist
- Kate Davis (born 1991), actress and musician
- Kate Davis (director), American director
- Catherine Davis (1924–2002), American poet
- Cathy Davis (born c. 1952), American boxer

== See also ==
- Kathryn Davis (disambiguation)
- Katie Davis (disambiguation)
- Catherine Davies (disambiguation)
