= Michal Dalyot =

Israeli parenting counselor

- מיכל דליות
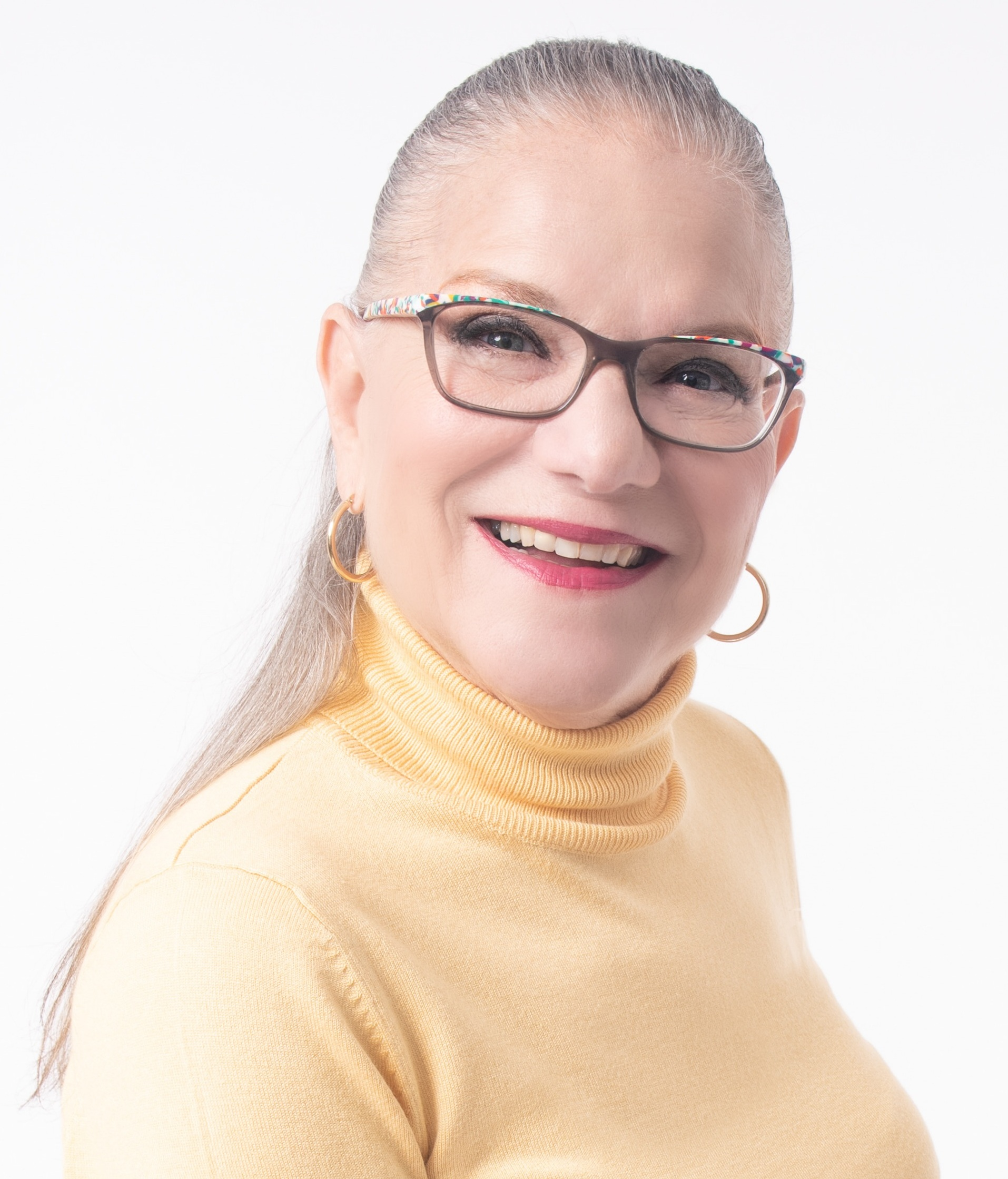
- Dalyot in September 2020
- Born: 15 May 1950 (age 76); Tel Aviv, Israel
- Citizenship: Israeli
- Occupations: Educator, parenting counselor, author, radio host, television presenter
- Known for: Israeli version of Supernanny
- Website: michaldalyot.co.il

Michal Dalyot (Hebrew: מיכל דליות; born 15 May 1950; also transliterated as Michal Daliot) is an Israeli educator, parenting counselor, author, radio host and television personality. She is best known in Israel as the host of the Israeli version of Supernanny. Dalyot is the founder of the Michal Dalyot Center, which provides parenting guidance, professional training programs, and lectures on family and parent-child relationships.

== Early life and education ==
Dalyot studied early childhood education at Levinsky College of Education and holds a teaching certificate in early childhood education. She later trained in parental guidance group facilitation and personal coaching at the Adler Institute.

Before becoming publicly known through television, Dalyot worked in early childhood education and later specialized in parent guidance and family counseling.

== Career ==
In 2002, Dalyot joined the board of directors of the Adler Institute. She later served as director of the institute's parent school and was also active as a coach in its coaching unit.

In 2008, she founded the Michal Dalyot Center. The center provides individual parent guidance, lectures and professional training programs for parenting counselors. Its professional training program has operated in cooperation with the Levinsky-Wingate Academic Center.

== Supernanny ==
In 2006, Dalyot was selected to lead the Israeli version of Supernanny, a family-advice reality television format broadcast in Israel on Channel 2 by Keshet. In the program, Dalyot worked with families experiencing difficulties in parenting, discipline and family communication.

The program became a high-profile television success in Israel. In June 2010, Globes reported that Supernanny reached the top of the weekly ratings table with a 29.5% rating. In June 2012, Globes reported that the opening episode of a new season led the daily ratings table with a 25.4% rating.

The program also drew criticism regarding the exposure of children and families on reality television. In 2008, The Jerusalem Post reported that Knesset member Aryeh Eldad criticized the program and claimed that it exploited children for ratings.

== Radio and public work ==
Dalyot hosts a weekly call-in advice program on Israeli radio station 103FM, where she answers listeners' questions on parenting and family issues.

She also lectures to parents, educators and organizations on parenting, family communication and authority in the family.

== Parenting approach ==
Dalyot's parenting approach emphasizes parental leadership, clear boundaries, responsibility, and respectful communication between parents and children. Her writing and public advice often focus on the idea that children's behavior should be understood in the context of family relationships and parental responses.

Her book Ein Yeladim Ra'im ("There Are No Bad Children") presents 18 case stories from her parenting clinic, dealing with issues such as refusal to cooperate, sibling conflict, fears, lying and sleep difficulties.

== Books ==
- Ein Yeladim Ra'im [There Are No Bad Children], Keshet Publishing, 2008.
- Horim, Ma HaShe'ela!? [Parents, What's the Question!?], self-published, 2015.
- Aval Hu Hitchil! [But He Started It!], with Ofra Sheffer-Barosh, Kinneret Zmora-Bitan, 2013.
- Bete'avon, Roni! [Bon Appétit, Roni!], with Ofra Sheffer-Barosh, Kinneret Zmora-Bitan, 2014.
- Laila Tov, Omer! [Good Night, Omer!], with Ofra Sheffer-Barosh, Kinneret Zmora-Bitan, 2014.
- Od Tochnit Ahat VeDai! [One More Show and That's It!], with Ofra Sheffer-Barosh, Kinneret Zmora-Bitan, 2017.
- Kacha Lo Medabrim! [That's Not How We Talk!], with Ofra Sheffer-Barosh, Kinneret Zmora-Bitan, 2019.
- HaMatkon LeGidul Yeladim Mutzlahim [The Recipe for Raising Successful Children], with Sharon Pe'er, Kinneret Zmora Dvir, 2021.
- What Your Child Really Means: 18 Real Stories from the Parenting Clinic, self-published, 2026.
