= Jo Frost: Nanny On Tour =

Television series

- Genre: Reality; Parenting
- Created by: Jo Frost
- Presented by: Jo Frost
- Country of origin: United States
- Original language: English
- No. of seasons: 1
- No. of episodes: 10

Production
- Executive producer: Mike Evans
- Running time: 42 minutes
- Production company: Nanny Jo Productions

Original release
- Network: Up TV
- Release: January 28 – March 31, 2016

Related
- Supernanny (American version)

Jo Frost: Nanny On Tour is an American short-lived reality television series, themed around parenting skills, hosted by British nanny Jo Frost. The series ran for 10 1-hour long episodes from January to March 2016 on Up TV. Jo Frost also serves as a producer on the show.

== Background ==
The series uses a similar theme that was used in Supernanny, which has Frost traveling to a new city each week and work with one family that desperately needs her expertise. Prior to her arrival, Frost monitors the family's behavior from her mobile RV office through the use of surveillance cameras through the consent of the family after they agree to have it placed throughout their home. Once she sees their weaknesses and errors, Frost helps the families come up with tools and techniques in order to improve their parenting skills, maintain their discipline and relationship with their children, and to keep in touch through progress reports. In addition, Frost also travels to communities where she seeks out help from people looking for advice from family issues to becoming better parents.

== Production ==
The series' format was based on a Dutch version that Frost did for RTL 4 in 2015. The concept was later picked up by Up TV in September 2015.

Frost also wanted to move away from the Supernanny image by adopting a contemporary look: "It was really important to be able to think what kind of format I can develop to allow me to be the staple in a family's home," Frost said, "and be able to look at a wider spectrum of issues we see in 21st century modern parenting."

== Episodes ==
No.	Title	Original release date	U.S. viewers (millions)
1	"4 on 4 and the Kids are Winning"	January 28, 2016	N/A
Jo comes to rescue of the Multi-generational Whisonant family, where she helps the mother and her grandparents try to control the chaos of their 4 children, aged 2-9. With 2-year-old Gabe ruling the house with his screaming and crying, the other 3 children are also acting out, 9-year-old Noah doesn't act out as much as his siblings, but he is very hyperactive. 4-year-old Jonah is the instigator, he is aggressive and disrespects his siblings, 2-year-old Kirkley has picked up her brothers' behavior. The family does not like to go out to eat because of Gabe, Jo also notices that Gabe and Kirkley still suck on pacifiers, even though they're 2.
2	"Firestarter or Peacemaker: What Are You?"	February 4, 2016	N/A
Jo helps a recently divorced mother of two understand her two children, each with a personality of their own. 6-year-old Grayce talks back and is a sassy tomboy, 9-year-old Michael is sensitive, as her mother disrespects him because of his behaviour.
3	"Phoning It In"	February 11, 2016	N/A
Jo visits a family that is on the verge of disarray with the father's new job, mother-teenage daughter tensions, and the youngest daughter's constant teasing of her brother who has serious health issues. Baby Anthony has life threatening allergies, so he needs lots of care. Alana teases Anthony because of his issues.
4	"Tech Overload"	February 18, 2016	N/A
Jo tackles a family that is not only dependent on technology, but must deal with the father's strict discipline that clashes with his wife's approach, which is taking a toll on their children, including one with special needs. Kristina is 11, Marcus is 9 and has Autism, and a 7 year old named Kierra. This episode caused a controversy where Jo reported Chris (the father) to the CPS because she thought that Chris hit Marcus with a belt, though Chris claims that he didn't hit Marcus and Chris only hit the bed with a belt.
5	"No Sleep for the Weary"	February 25, 2016	N/A
A couple with two children are coming down with a case of "roommate syndrome" as the father is letting their children sleep in their bed and causing a nightmare that is on the verge of breaking this family apart.
6	"Happy Wife, Happy Life"	March 3, 2016	N/A
A Georgia woman whose husband is on the road but feels stuck at home and afraid to be seen in public thanks to her children turns to Jo for help.
7	"99 Problems and the Kids Ain't One"	March 10, 2016	N/A
Jo helps a family that is dealing with a pattern in which the children seem to be picking up the same behavior as their parents.
8	"Double Trouble"	March 17, 2016	N/A
Jo helps a 28-year-old working mother of 3, two of them twins, sort out a way to balance her family life that is also complicated by her live-in mother.
9	"The Miracle Becomes the Nightmare"	March 24, 2016	N/A
An East Los Angeles family who has survived a father's battle with cancer turns to Jo to face another crisis: their 3-year-old son, whose behavior is causing problems at pre-school and at home.
10	"Good Cop, Bad Cop"	March 31, 2016	N/A
Jo helps a couple, both police officers, lay down the law on their two misbehaving children.

(This section is unfinished, you can help finish it by finding more details about these Episodes and edit their descriptions)

== International broadcast ==
In the United Kingdom, the series aired on Quest Red in March 2017.
