= Family S.O.S. with Jo Frost =

American reality television series

- Genre: Reality
- Starring: Jo Frost
- Country of origin: United States
- Original language: English
- No. of seasons: 1
- No. of episodes: 6

Production
- Running time: 42 minutes
- Production company: Eyeworks USA

Original release
- Network: TLC
- Release: May 28 – July 2, 2013

Family S.O.S. with Jo Frost is an American reality television series that premiered May 28, 2013, on TLC. In contrast from Frost’s previous show Supernanny, which focuses mainly on toddlers, in this series Frost helps families of all ages. From parents contemplating divorce, angsty teenagers, family disputes, to tormenting in school. The series covers a multitude of problems that many families face.

== Synopsis ==
Much like her original series, Supernanny, Jo visits homes of families who need assistance with instilling peace within the home. Unlike her original series, Jo helps families of any age, size or structure — not just children. It gives an insight to solving some of the issues created in part by the 21st century such as cyberbullying, abuse, and addiction.

== Episodes ==
No.	Title	Original release date	U.S. viewers (millions)
1	"If This Doesn't Work, It's Over"	May 28, 2013	1.15
In the 90-minute series premiere, Jo arrives at the home of the Quinn-Davises. Both parents have children from previous marriages, and tension has reached a limit. Their daughters Emily and Amber have chosen not to follow the rules or give their parents respect. Their son Derek has become low-spirited due to all the fighting within the home. Chad has overcome his addiction, initially believing that the presence of Jo is staged, and is recovering. Julie and Don, the parents, each defend their children — which sets a divide that is heading towards divorce. While Jo is visiting, Chad receives some horrifying news regarding a close friend and Amber struggles with alcohol consumption.
2	"I Told You Not to Bring That ONE Thing Up!"	June 4, 2013	0.87
Jo arrives to help the Mead Family, who live in Westlake Village, California. Tara, 47, David, 44, constantly fight and argue in front of their three young kids, Peyton, Roman and Austin who have disciplinary issues and who call names and swear. They are also sensitive to their parents' fighting. Meanwhile Ashlynn, Tara and David's teenage daughter was recently caught with cigarettes and condoms, and has a torn relationship with her dad, often fighting and arguing with him.
3	"He's Scared of You...All the Children Are"	June 11, 2013	0.89
Jo Frost heads to the Campos Family in Thousand Oaks, Calif. Brandy and George have five children. The couple have issues in regards to raising their kids, Brandy is at her wits end dealing with the children, while George has a short fuse and finds himself bullying and hitting the children. Some of the children have issues of their own. Blake is getting bullied at school, he finally snapped and is now in trouble with the law. Corey has Down syndrome and struggles with potty training, he often defecates on himself, In response, George shames him and sprays him with water.
4	"Finger Pointing and Blah, Blah, Blah!"	June 18, 2013	0.73
Jo is called to Los Angeles to help relieve the tension in the Mitchell Family. Kay and Mitch aren't on the same page in regards to discipline. Mitch prefers to bribe the kids. Their conflicting personalities result in arguments which affects their children. Especially eldest son Cameron who resents his parents and takes his anger out on his brother.
5	"You're NOT My Mother"	June 25, 2013	0.79
Jo arrives in Manhattan Beach to help the Bross Family. Dad Larry works in Las Vegas and is only home on weekends, but feels that their daughters need boundaries and consequences. Mom Debbie does not believe in consequences or discipline, which leads to their daughters acting out. Their daughters Addisyn (14) and twins Abrielle and Alysse (11) are adopted and Debbie is fearful that giving consequences will push them further away. The twins are unruly and often point out that Debbie and Larry are not their parents.
6	"This Isn't Love"	July 2, 2013	0.52
Jo travels to Cypress, California, to assist the non-traditional Coburn-Hunter family. Chris Hunter and Crystle Coburn are not married. Crystle has a daughter, Austoria (22), who is a lesbian. Crystle does not accept Austoria's sexuality or her girlfriend. Additionally, Crystle has a son, Daeryan, with whom she does not have a relationship. Chris and Crystle also have a son together, Trebian. Chris cheated on Crystle when they first began dating, which has led to Crystle’s lack of trust and forgiveness towards him, causing hostility within the family.
