= List of Supernanny episodes =

Supernanny is a reality television programme that aired on Channel 4 from 7 July 2004 to 8 October 2008. The show features professional nanny Jo Frost, who devotes each episode to helping a family where the parents are struggling with their child-rearing.

== Series overview ==
Supernanny series overview[1][2]
Series	Episodes	Originally released	
Series	Episodes	First released	Last released
1	3	7 July 2004	21 July 2004
2	12	5 April 2005	5 October 2005
3	6	29 August 2006	3 October 2006
4	5	29 August 2007	26 September 2007
5	3	24 September 2008	8 October 2008

== Episodes ==
=== Series 1 (2004) ===
No. overall	No. in series	Title	Location	Original release date	UK viewers (millions)
1	1	"The Woods Family"	Grantham, Lincolnshire	7 July 2004	4.88
Lucy and Steve Woods have three children: 12-year-old Caitlin, 10-year-old Billy, and 2-year-old Charlie. Charlie rules the house as he throws tantrums and screams to get his way. Caitlin and Billy feel ignored by their parents because of Charlie's temper.
2	2	"The Steer Family"	Crawley, West Sussex	14 July 2004	6.00
Kelly Steer has two children: 5-year-old Sophie and 4-year-old Callum. Both of Kelly's children never do as they are told, and Kelly finds herself unable to discipline them, even with her mother, Trina's, full time help.
3	3	"The Charles Family"	Milton Keynes, Buckinghamshire	21 July 2004	5.83
Amanda and Kevin Charles have three children: 4-year-old Jacob and 15-month-old fraternal twins Isabelle and Maxwell. Jacob used to be well-behaved, but is now jealous of the twins.

=== Series 2 (2005) ===
No. overall	No. in series	Title	Location	Original release date	UK viewers (millions)
4	1	"The Collins Family"	Northampton	5 April 2005	4.96
Karen and Jason Collins have four children: 10-year-old Ben, 9-year-old Lauren, 6-year-old Joshua, and 4-year-old Joseph. It is mob rule as the kids damage things, swear, run around and out of the house, and disrespect their mother. When dad Jason comes home, he punishes the kids and sometimes he is too rough causing Karen and Jason to be at loggerheads.
5	2	"The Hemingway-Clegg Family"	West Yorkshire	12 April 2005	5.03
Claire Hemingway and Bruce Clegg have three sons: 5-year-old Nathaniel, who has diabetes, 2-year-old Craig, and 6-month-old Michael. Nathaniel is aware of his illness and uses it to guilt trip his parents into getting things that he wants even controlling if the TV is on or not. Craig is following Nathaniel's footsteps.
6	3	"The Pandit Family"	Stevenage, Hertfordshire	19 April 2005	4.13
Caroline and Suni Pandit have four children: 7-year-old Jaimin "Jamie", 6-year-old Jasmine, 5-year-old Jenna, and 3-year-old Jayan “Tiny”. The kids behave like teenagers despite their age. Jaimie is 7 going on 17, he takes his dad's credit card and orders things, and does paper rounds on his street. The children prepare meals themselves, swear like adults, and control bedtime, Jasmine won't go to sleep unless her parents do while Tiny won't go down without a fight.
7	4	"The Douglas Family"	Staines-upon-Thames	26 April 2005	5.08
Alexandra "Sandra" and Doug Douglas have 4-year-old fraternal twin children: George and Nicole. The twins regularly throw violent temper tantrums that led to kicking, biting, swearing, and screaming for up to 4 hours without stopping, but are well-behaved with their babysitters and Doug states that teachers and people at school have said that George and Nicole are "little angels". Sandra also thinks Nicole hates her.
8	5	"The Cooke Family"	Bishop's Stortford, Hertfordshire	17 August 2005	4.63
Denise and Paul Cooke have three daughters: 9-year-old Meghann, 6-year-old Gabriella, and 4-year-old Erin. Meghann is the ringleader as she is willful and erupts at every given moment. Gabriella and Erin have copied Meghann's aggressive behaviour and all the girls get into arguments with each other and their parents. Denise's relationship with Meghann is strained and so is the former's relationship with Paul. Because of the girls' behaviour, the family hardly ever go out in fear for an embarrassing scene.
9	6	"The Seniors Family"	Coventry, Warwickshire	24 August 2005	5.14
Debbie Seniors has three daughters: 5-year-old Bethany, 3-year-old Ruth, and 2-year-old Hannah. Bethany is the ringleader of the girl gang, while Ruth is cheeky and rude towards Debbie. Hannah copies her big sisters. All three girls will often team up to drive their mum ragged. Even with the help of her parents, who live next door, Debbie has lost control.
10	7	"The Bradbury-Lambert Family"	Swindon, North East Wiltshire	31 August 2005	5.26
Laura Bradbury and Stuart Lambert have three children: 5-year-old Matthew, 2-year-old Tegan-Olivia, and 5-month-old Diesel. Matthew is very explosive, he kicks, punches, hits, screams, swears, and destroys the house if anything doesn't go his way, Teagan-Olivia is starting to become foul-mouthed and difficult as well. Laura is completely clueless and allows herself to be abused by her son, when step-dad Stuart tries to step in, Laura refuses it so Stuart ends up disciplining Teagan-Olivia and Laura deals with Matthew.
11	8	"The Agate Family"	Littlehampton, West Sussex	7 September 2005	4.46
Wendy Agate has three daughters: 10-year-old Marie, 9-year-old Amie, and 7-year-old Mary-Anne. While Marie and Amie are well-behaved, Mary-Anne rules the house. She is explosive, violent, and turns her aggression on her family. She runs out of the house multiple times a day. Marie and Amy are angry and fed up with Mary-Anne's behavior and feel neglected.
12	9	"The Young Family"	Witham, Essex	14 September 2005	5.06
Sue and Paul Young have five sons: 8-year-old Nathaniel, 7-year-old Caleb, 6-year-old Benjamin, 3-year-old Jacob, and 8-month-old Joel. With so many children to deal with, the house has become a classic case of mob rule as the elder boys spit, fight, and damage things. Desperate to regain control, Sue and Paul have resorted, unsuccessfully, to physical punishment, by smacking their boys with slippers and wooden spoons.
13	10	"The Ball Family"	South London	21 September 2005	5.31
Michelle Ball has two sons: 3-year-old Ryan and 1-year-old Kyle. Ryan has a vice-like grip over Michelle, wears nappies, uses dummies, and violently bullies his baby brother, Kyle. Even with her mother, Iris' full time help, Michelle is completely lost.
14	11	"The Bixley Family"	Peterborough, Cambridgeshire	28 September 2005	5.57
Heather and Alex Bixley have two sons: 7-year-old Brandon and 4-year-old Zak. As a result of experiencing gastric flu as a baby, Brandon avoids any food except crisps or chips. Zak has picked up Brandon's behaviour, while Heather and Alex fail to see eye to eye.
15	12	"The Woods Family revisited"	Grantham, Lincolnshire	5 October 2005	4.86
Charlie Woods, now 3 years old, has improved his behaviour since Jo's previous visit with his family a year earlier, with his parents, Lucy and Steve, still using her techniques.

=== Series 3 (2006) ===
No. overall	No. in series	Title	Location	Original release date	UK viewers (millions)
16	1	"The Hillhouse-Docherty Family"	Ayr, (Scotland)	29 August 2006	3.29
Kerry Hillhouse has a 9-year-old son named Ryan, and her live-in boyfriend, Steven Docherty, has 3-year-old identical twin sons, David and Declan. The twins swear like troopers and lash out at their parents. Ryan's rage is becoming concerning, he screams his head off, kicks, smacks, punches, swears, and makes death threats. Kerry and Steven shout at their sons (especially Ryan).
17	2	"The Howat Family"	Shenley near Radlett, Hertfordshire	5 September 2006	3.44
Tara Howat has three children: 8-year-old Casey, 7-year-old Shannon, and 4-year-old Rhys. Rhys is the ringleader, as he swears and disrespects his mother. Shannon and Casey are overlooked because of their brother. While Casey gives up, Shannon demands her mum's attention and is picking up Rhys’ behaviour.
18	3	"The Brown-Smith Family"	Warrington, Cheshire	12 September 2006	3.13
Simon Brown and Stephanie Smith have three children: 7-year-old Lewis, 5-year-old Rhys, and 9-month-old Lucy. Lewis and Rhys misbehave for their mum. They fight like cat and dog and swear. Simon rules with an iron fist so the boys behave whenever he's around.
19	4	"The Bates Family"	Evesham, Worcestershire	19 September 2006	3.05
Sarah and Stuart Bates have four children: 7-year-old Haydn, 5-year-old Callum "Calvin", and 3-year-old identical twins Erin and Orla. The twins rule the house as they bicker, scream off their head at their mother, and bully other children at nursery school. Meanwhile, good boys Haydn and Callum never get any time with their mother and are often blamed for Erin and Orla's mess because they are forgotten (sometimes literally) and Erin and Orla blame them.
20	5	"The Williams Family"	Birmingham	26 September 2006	3.08
Natalie and Martin Williams have four children: 7-year-old Bethany, 6-year-old Tyler, 5-year-old Lori, and 4-year-old Tia. Ringleader only son Tyler is very aggressive and disrespects his mother and sisters. The eldest, Bethany, refuses to sleep on her own. The baby of the family, Tia, has picked up Tyler's aggressive behaviour. While all the kids misbehave, while Martin just sits looking on his computer or fixing the mobile takeaway.
21	6	"The Pollard-Morris Family"	Tadworth, Surrey	3 October 2006	2.91
Trisha Pollard and Darren Morris have four children: 12-year-old Luke, 8-year-old James, 3-year-old Matthew, and 18-month-old Francesca. Trisha had two sons for her first marriage, and handyman Darren had two children for his marriage. Matthew is spreading misery around the home, as he whinges to get his own way, and is mollycoddled by Trisha with dummies and hugs. Second eldest James is physically aggressive toward Matthew, believing he is punishing him, as Trisha and Darren rarely discipline him.

=== Series 4 (2007) ===
No. overall	No. in series	Title	Location	Original release date	UK viewers (millions)
22	1	"The Smith-Clarke Family"	Northampton	29 August 2007	3.01
Nicky Smith and Chris Clarke have two sons: 4-year-old Cameron and 1-year-old or 15-month-old Mackenzie. Before Mackenzie was born, Nicky and Chris had another son named Josh, who died from cot death just a month before his first birthday. Cameron's violent outbursts are out of control and extreme, to the point that his nursery place is now in jeopardy, placing himself in borrowed time. As a result, Supernanny's naughty step isn't even an option, and Nicky and Chris fail to see eye to eye.
23	2	"The Gormley-Brickley Family"	West London	5 September 2007	2.94
Ann Gormley and Steve Brickley have two sets of four twin children: 4 and 3/4-year-old fraternal twins, Aiden and Ella, and 2 and 1/2-year-old identical twins, Louis "Louie" and Ciaran. Aiden and Ella fight like cat and dog, and they still drink from baby bottles and still wear nappies (despite Ella not wanting to wear them), while Louis and Ciaran still eat puréed food as they refuse to eat normal, solid food.
24	3	"The Wynne-Jones Family"	Llandudno, Conwy (Wales)	12 September 2007	2.38
Lin Wynne and Ronny Jones have four children: 13-year-old Simone, 10-year-old Andrew, 4-year-old Ben, and 2-year-old Georgia. Simone and Andrew constantly fight, Ben has a dangerous obsession with stealing household appliances, while Georgia gets into mischief. While Lin looks after the children, Ronny is always out either at a football game or the pub, and never bothers to help out.
25	4	"The Cooke Family revisited"	Bishop's Stortford, Hertfordshire	19 September 2007	2.26
Two years after Supernanny's last visit with the Cooke family, her techniques have worked out hugely with eldest daughter Meghann, now 11, who is now less naughty, and she learned that she has an artistic temperament. Gabriella is now 8, but the youngest daughter, Erin, now 6, has started to pick up her older sister's habits and her past behaviour.
26	5	"The Douglas Family revisited"	Staines-upon-Thames	26 September 2007	2.19
Fraternal twin siblings George and Nicole Douglas, now 6 years old, are less aggressive toward their parents, Sandra and Doug, than they were two years earlier.

=== Series 5 (2008) ===
No. overall	No. in series	Title	Location	Original release date	UK viewers (millions)
27	1	"The Hancox-Smith Family"	Liverpool, Merseyside	24 September 2008	2.60
Jenny Hancox and Simon Smith have three children: 8-year-old Cameron, 5-year-old Flynn, and 2-year-old Madison (almost 3). Cameron and Flynn fight like cat and dog, while the baby of the family, Madison, has a vice grip over Jenny, as she is still being breastfed and sleeps in the same bed as Jenny, despite having a room of her own.
28	2	"The Porter Family"	Bridgwater, Somerset	1 October 2008	2.22
Hayley and Merrill Porter have two children: 9-year-old Maddison "Maddie", and 7-year-old Harry. Princess Maddison rules the household, as her ferocious temper is becoming unmanageable. Harry feels left out and has picked up his sister's behaviour. Hayley constantly does everything for Madison, including brushing her teeth, choosing clothes for her and cutting up her food for her. Hayley's previous child (before Maddison and Harry were born) died before he was two, and this may have contributed to Hayley's overprotectiveness over Madison.
29	3	"The Tomlin Family"	Portishead, North Somerset	8 October 2008	2.46
Claire and Paul Tomlin have three children: 3-year-old Amelia, and 2-year-old identical twins George and Freddie. George and Freddie fight like cat and dog and are clingy towards their mother, Claire. Freddie and George also throw up if they don't get the attention they crave, which can happen several times a day, while Amelia is becoming aggressive and is feeling left out. Claire and Paul recently cancelled a family holiday to France, because the thought of travel was too stressful because of the kids. At night time, Claire and Paul resort to locking the twins in their rooms.
