= Supernanny (Portuguese TV series) =

Portuguese version of the British television programme Supernanny

- Genre: Reality
- Presented by: Teresa Paula Marques
- Country of origin: Portugal
- Original language: Portuguese
- No. of seasons: 1
- No. of episodes: 2 (1 unaired, 5 unproduced)

Production
- Camera setup: Multi-camera
- Running time: 50 minutes
- Production company: Warner Bros. International Television

Original release
- Network: SIC
- Release: January 17 – January 21, 2018

Supernanny, also known as Supernanny: SOS Famílias is a Portuguese reality television series presented by professional nanny Teresa Paula Marques that documents parents struggling with various aspects of raising their children (e.g. their children's behavior, mealtime, potty training, etc.). Based on the British Supernanny format, it only lasted for two episodes (out of a planned season of eight episodes) on SIC, where it premiered on 14 January 2018, and, after airing the second episode, went suspended due to concerns of it violating children's rights and privacy. The rest of the series ultimately never aired.

== Premise ==
The show, featuring professional nanny Teresa Paula Marques, is an adaptation of the British series of the same name, featuring Jo Frost. Marques devotes each episode to helping a family where the parents are struggling with their child-rearing. Through instruction and observation, she shows the parents alternative ways to discipline their children and regain order in their households. Marques was born in Tramagal in 1966, and, as of the time of filming, lived in Lisbon.

== Broadcast ==
SIC acquired the format in 2006, however its implementation was delayed, especially from 2016, when network executives studied its potential legal implications. Early in January 2018, SIC announced that the Portuguese adaptation would premiere on 14 January, competing against Secret Story 7 on TVI. Each episode lasted 50 minutes and ran in the 9:40pm timeslot. SIC and WBTV Portugal agreed on an initial season of eight episodes. The first of the two episodes broadcast attracted 1,181,000 viewers and took SIC to the lead midway. The second and last episode shown, on 21 January, attracted a 67,000 increase (up to 1,148,800 viewers) at its peak, higher than the previous episode, despite the controversies and requests to boycott it (see below).

== Controversy ==
Almost from the series' premiere, the Portuguese media regulator ERC received a series of reports critical of it. These reports showed that the series violated fundamental human rights. On the morning of 15 January, the National Commission for the Promotion of the Rights and Protection of Children and Young People (known for its Portuguese initials CNPDPCJ) issued a warning for the series' "high risk" of exposing children's privacy without consent. UNICEF's Portuguese committee also criticized it with the same justifications given by CNPDPCJ.

One of the families involved in the series (the Antunes family from episode 1) contacted CNPDPCJ the day following the premiere. Organization chairman Rosário Farmhouse said that although the family issued a contract to allow their children to appear on the program; moreover, it stated that families did not recognize their children in the behavior presented in the program. Family mother Cláudia Antunes told Portuguese website New in Town (NiT) that she could not deliver further information unless CNPDPCJ was involved. SIC, on the other hand, defended the format by referring to several successful international versions (in France, Germany, Spain etc:) assuring that those countries had adequate "standards where the protections of the rights of minors were less demanding than the ones in Portugal".

Despite the controversy around its premiere, SIC decided to ignore the campaign and decided to go ahead with the second episode on 21 January. The family profiled was the Frade family from Sintra, which had two children, ages 5 and 13. In the wake of its airing, pediatrician Mário Cordeiro revealed on his Facebook account that he announced a boycott of the channel while Supernanny was on air.

On 26 January 2018, the Oeiras Court announced that it would suggest SIC the inclusion of image and sound filters to the children involved in the then-upcoming third episode. This was a provisional measure; a final decision would be taken by the court on 15 February. Later that day, SIC received a suspension ruling from a court from West Lisbon, making the broadcast of said episode unviable. The channel apologized its viewers who followed the format and recognized its "educational format" and "stimulating a wide public debate on parenting issues".

The trial took place on 20 February, five days after the initial planned date (15 February), featuring the families from the 14 and 21 January episodes and the ones from the cancelled 28 January episode. Two of the families involved announced that they had revoked their consent notices to the producers, however, the content of the two episodes continued on SIC's website for the time being.

On 21 May 2020, SIC lost an appeal and was forbidden to air images of the series without prior authorizaton from CPCJ.
