= Jo Frost: Extreme Parental Guidance =

- Genre: Reality
- Starring: Jo Frost
- Narrated by: Bob Marsden; Anthony Green
- Country of origin: United Kingdom
- Original language: English
- No. of series: 2
- No. of episodes: 14

Production
- Running time: 60 minutes (inc. adverts)
- Production company: Outline Productions

Original release
- Network: Channel 4
- Release: 9 February 2010 – 5 August 2012

Related
- Supernanny; Jo Frost: Family Matters

Jo Frost: Extreme Parental Guidance is a British reality television programme that aired on Channel 4 from 9 February 2010 to 5 August 2012. It serves as a follow-up programme to Supernanny that ran from 7 July 2004 to 8 October 2008.

== Transmissions ==
Jo Frost: Extreme Parental Guidance overview[1][2]
Series	Episodes	Originally released	
Series	Episodes	First released	Last released
1	6	9 February 2010	16 March 2010
2	8	6 July 2011	5 August 2012

== Episodes ==
=== Series 1 (2010) ===
No. overall	No. in series	Title	Location(s)	Original release date
1	1	Kiran (The Hussain Family) and Bronwyn (The Phillip Family)	Leeds, West Yorkshire & Dorset	9 February 2010
Sophia, 22 and Abid, 24 have a 4-year-old girl, Kiran, and a 6-month-old girl, Kaki. Emma and Adrian have a 12-year-old girl, Bronwyn, and a 1-year-old girl, Eloise. Kiran has only eaten sweets and wears the clothes of a 1-year-old and is falling behind in almost every aspect of development. In desperation, mum Sophia has started to force-feed her child. Bronwyn hates her appearance so much she is unable to lead a normal life, cries daily about the way she looks and compares herself harshly to celebrities in magazines. She now refuses to leave the house without spending two hours putting on makeup and mum Emma has no idea how to cope.
2	2	Madison (The Wren Family) and Bailey (The Ward Family)	Glasgow & Blackpool, Lancashire	16 February 2010
Moya and Duncan have a 15-year-old girl, Leah, and a 9-year-old girl, Madison. Louise has a 10-year-old boy, Bailey, and 5-year-old identical twin girls, Harleigh and Madison. Madison has always been given everything she ever wanted, from hand made dresses to £200 tracksuits. But her family have paid a heavy price for such largesse, both financially and emotionally. Bailey spends up to 80 hours a week playing online computer games, while his Mum struggles to cope with two demanding younger siblings.
3	3	Regan (The Coughlan Family) and Josh (The Dumbleton Family)	West London & Manchester	23 February 2010
Babar, 52 and Cliff, 57 have a 9-year-old boy, Jordan, and a 7-year-old boy, Regan, who was born with attention deficit hyperactivity disorder. Joanne has a 10-year-old boy, Joshua. Babar and Cliff are struggling to cope with 7-year-old Regan's diagnosis. Josh has been classed as obese.
4	4	Rio (The McLeod Family) and Katie-Ann (The Griffin Family)	Nottingham, Nottinghamshire & Birmingham, Warwickshire	2 March 2010
Amanda, 46 and Roger, 52 have a 9-year-old girl, Saffron, a 6-year-old boy, Rio, and a 4-year-old girl, Sienna. Annette and Robert have a 9-year-old boy, Callum, and a 3-year-old girl, Katie-Ann. Rio eats almost nothing but bread and butter which causes mealtimes to be a disaster. Katie-Ann constantly pulls her hair out, leaving bald patches all over her head.
5	5	Paige (The Simmons Family)	North Woolwich	9 March 2010
Joanne has a 6-year-old girl, Paige, and a 4-year-old girl, Poppy. Paige has never slept a full night in her own bed: meaning that her mum hasn't had more than four hours uninterrupted sleep in over six years.
6	6	Michael (The Singh Family)	Oldbury Nr.Birmingham, Warwickshire	16 March 2010
Letchme and Surinder have a 4-year-old boy, Michael, and a 7-month-old girl, Manisha. Michael is ruling the house with constant back-talk.

=== Series 2 (2011–12) ===
No. overall	No. in series	Title	Location(s)	Original release date
7	1	Jack and Phoebe (The Murphy Family) and George and Maddie (The Laws Family)	North London & Newcastle	6 July 2011
Nikkie has a 6-year-old boy called Jack and a 4-year-old girl called Phoebe. Kelly and Simon have a 5-year-old boy called George and a 3-year-old girl called Maddie, who was born with Rett syndrome. Jack would bruise his mum every night and is very violent and destructive. It often took until 1:00 AM to get him to sleep. George is falling behind from school because of his superhero obsession.
8	2	Max (The Ryder Family) and Trenyce (The Schwartz Family)	Hull & North Crystal Palace, East London	13 July 2011
Jo has a 12-year-old boy called John, a 9-year-old boy called Max and a 5-year-old girl called Willow. Sheryl has a 7-year-old girl called Trenyce and a 3-year-old boy called Tristane.
9	3	Madison (The Reynolds Family) and Layla (The Simpson Family)	Reading & Ilford	20 July 2011
Sharon and Jason have an 11-year-old girl called Jordan and a 6-year-old girl called Madison. Asli and Peter have a 5-year-old girl called Layla, a 2-year-old girl called Melissa and a 6-month-old boy called Aiden.
10	4	Tashan and Diaan (The Abbas Family), and Grace and Ella (The Pickering Family)	Cardiff & West Millwall	27 July 2011
Sejal and Ramesh have a 6-year-old boy called Tashan and a 4-year-old boy called Diaan. Sue and Neil have a 7-year-old girl called Ella, a 5-year-old girl called Amy and a 3-year-old girl called Grace.
11	5	Jack, Chloe and Demi (The Haynes Family), and Corey (The Potter Family)	South London & Surrey	3 August 2011
Maria and Scott have an 11-year-old boy called Jack, a 6-year-old girl called Chloe, and a 4-year-old girl called Demi. Emma and Alex have a 6-year-old girl called Anya, a 5-year-old boy called Corey, and a 1-year-old girl called Alanis.
12	6	Josh (The Smith Family) and Oliver (The Butterly Family)	Portsmouth & Ipswich	10 August 2011
Tracy and Buster have an 11-year-old boy called Josh, a 6-year-old girl called Neve and a 4-year-old boy called Cameron. Corinne and Chris have a 5-year-old boy called Oliver, a 3-year-old boy called Thomas and a 1-year-old girl called Jodie.
13	7	Paige (The Simmons Family), Bailey (The Ward Family) and Madison (The Wren Family) revisited	North Woolwich, Blackpool & Glasgow	24 August 2011
Joanne has an 8-year-old girl called Paige and a 6-year-old girl called Poppy. Louise has a 12-year-old boy called Bailey, 7-year-old identical twin girls called Madison and Harleigh. Moya and Duncan have a 17-year-old girl called Leah and an 11-year-old girl called Madison.
14	8	Rio (The McLeod Family), Regan (The Coughlan Family) and Bronwyn (The Phillip Family) revisited	Dorset, Nottingham & West London	5 August 2012
Emma and Adrian have a 14-year-old girl called Bronwyn and a 3-year-old girl called Eloise. Amanda and Roger have an 11-year-old girl Saffron, an 8-year-old boy called Rio and a 6-year-old girl called Sienna. Babar and Cliff have an 11-year-old boy called Jordan and a 9-year-old boy called Regan, who was born with attention deficit hyperactivity disorder.
