= Bringing Up Bates =

American reality television show

- Genre: Reality
- Starring: Bates Family
- Country of origin: United States
- No. of seasons: 10
- No. of episodes: 185 (including specials)

Original release
- Network: Up TV
- Release: January 1, 2015 – June 24, 2021

Bringing Up Bates (stylized as Br1n9ing Up Bates) is an American reality television show on Up TV. It is centered around Gil and Kelly Bates, their 19 children, and their extended family.

On January 18, 2022, Up TV announced the show's cancellation after 10 seasons, with the network stating that they are shifting their focus onto new movies and scripted shows for 2022. The family and film crew had already filmed episodes for season 11 which will not air due to its cancellation.

== Background ==
The Bates family were previously featured on a TV series called United Bates of America on TLC, and it was later announced in October 2014 that the family would return in a new series which would be called Bringing Up Bates on Up TV. The series debuted on January 1, 2015.

The show follows the daily lives of Gil and Kelly Jo Bates, not far from Knoxville, Tennessee and their family of 18 children. Another child was born in 2012, bringing the number to 19 children.

== Cast ==
The cast includes William Gilvin "Gil" Bates, Kelly Jo Bates, and their children Zachary, Michaela, Erin, Lawson, Nathan, Alyssa, Tori, Trace, Carlin, Josie, Katie, Jackson, Warden, Isaiah, Addallee, Ellie, Callie, Judson, and Jeb.

== Episodes ==
=== Series overview ===
Season	Episodes	Originally released	
Season	Episodes	First released	Last released
Specials	10	December 31, 2015	February 20, 2020
1	13	January 1, 2015	March 26, 2015
2	14	June 4, 2015	September 3, 2015
3	14	January 2, 2016	April 7, 2016
4	25	June 2, 2016	December 29, 2016
5	15	January 5, 2017	April 13, 2017
6	16	June 1, 2017	September 14, 2017
7	20	January 4, 2018	June 21, 2018
8	24	January 3, 2019	November 21, 2019
9	22	March 5, 2020	August 27, 2020
10	12	April 8, 2021	June 24, 2021

=== Specials ===
No.	Title	Original release date	U.S. viewers (millions)
Sp–1	"Best Bates Moments"	December 31, 2015	0.154
Sp–2	"Mother's Day"	May 5, 2016	N/A
Sp–3	"From the Couch: Back Seat Bates"	May 12, 2016	N/A
Sp–4	"From the Couch: Organized Chaos"	May 19, 2016	N/A
Sp–5	"Summer Fun"	May 26, 2016	N/A
Sp–6	"From the Couch: The Bates Go To Florida"	September 8, 2016	N/A
Sp–7	"From the Couch: Thanksgiving"	November 17, 2016	N/A
Sp–8	"Bates Birthing Babies Bonaza"	September 4, 2017	N/A
Sp–9	"From Friends to Fiances"	September 28, 2017	N/A
Sp–10	"I Love You Day Special"	February 13, 2020	N/A
Sp–11	"Bates Season 9 First Look Special!"	February 20, 2020	N/A

=== Season 1 (2015) ===
No.	Title	Original release date	U.S. viewers (millions)
1	"Meet the Bates"	January 1, 2015	0.525
Introduction to the Bates family who have 19 children and are expecting their first grandchild.
2	"Courtship and Marriage"	January 8, 2015	0.491
Erin invites a few of the younger siblings to a sleepover while Michaela goes to visit her boyfriend. Zach and Whitney have their final ultrasound. Chad and Erin consult the doctor to find out what caused their miscarriages.
3	"Bates Go Wild"	January 15, 2015	0.590
The family goes camping and Kelly has the kids help with packing.
4	"Training Up Bates"	January 22, 2015	0.601
Disciplining kids is never easy, but by now Gil and Kelly have it down to a science with their method: "Train Up." Chad and Erin are expecting again and head for a checkup.
5	"Nashville Son"	January 29, 2015	N/A
Gil, Kelly, and the younger kids plant a fall garden. With so many opinions to juggle, deciding on location and vegetation is difficult. Meanwhile, budding gospel/country singer/songwriter Lawson heads to Nashville to further his musical career. With one published CD under his belt, he lands a meeting with a record-label executive and a coveted session with a well-known vocal coach. Back at the Bates base, the garden finally gets planted with Chad's help and the family eagerly awaits news from Lawson in Nashville.
6	"Organized Chaos"	February 5, 2015	0.555
The family changes their wardrobe from winter to spring, then sings at a bluegrass music festival.
7	"Welcome Grandbaby Bates"	February 12, 2015	0.528
With their first child due in two weeks, Zach and Whitney have much to do and the family steps in to help. Finally the big day arrives, bringing with it Bradley – the Bates' very first grandson!
8	"The Purity Ring"	February 19, 2015	N/A
Carlin goes on a special date with Gil and Kelly, who give her a special surprise. The family also visits baby Bradley and his parents, Zach and Whitney. Later, Lawson performs the National Anthem before a huge crowd.
9	"Brandon and Michaela"	February 26, 2015	0.787
Brandon visits, but will there be an engagement?
10	"A Big Bates Thanksgiving"	March 5, 2015	0.353
Headed for a visit with Alyssa and John, the family has to stop and celebrate Thanksgiving. Also: Chad and Erin learn that they are expecting a son!
11	"The Bates Go to Florida"	March 12, 2015	0.258
The family heads to Florida to visit John and Alyssa, who reveal that they are expecting a daughter.
12	"All About the Bates"	March 19, 2015	0.402
The family sits down to answer questions from the fans.
13	"A Birthday to Remember"	March 26, 2015	0.556
The family gathers to celebrate Gil's 50th birthday.

=== Season 2 (2015) ===
No.	Title	Original release date	U.S. viewers (millions)
1	"All Together Again"	June 4, 2015	0.314
The Bates family celebrates their "I love you" days and then they throw Alyssa a baby shower.
2	"Meet the Parents"	June 11, 2015	0.274
Gil, Kelly, and Michaela head to Chicago to meet Brandon's parents while Chad, Erin, and the kids redecorate Gil and Kelly's room.
3	"High Risk, High Hopes"	June 18, 2015	0.262
Chad and Erin have a checkup to make sure the baby is doing well. The boys build a fort. Chad and Erin spend time with Zach and Whitney.
4	"Movin' In With Meema"	June 25, 2015	0.264
Gil and Kelly take Josie and Trace for braces. Later, Kelly takes her mother house-hunting.
5	"Blessings... and New Beginnings?"	July 2, 2015	0.194
Lawson and Nathan have their New York City friends over while the girls throw Erin a shower for baby Carson.
6	"Brandon Pops the Question*"	July 9, 2015	0.326
Gil and Kelly head out to Florida to meet John and Alyssa's daughter Allie Jane, then go to DC to see Michaela get engaged.
7	"Doctor's Orders"	July 16, 2015	0.432
Michaela starts to plan her wedding by looking at churches, while Chad and Erin go for another checkup on baby Carson.
8	"Life Lessons"	July 23, 2015	0.222
Kelly shows how she homeschools; Tori heads to college; Nathan goes to flight school.
9	"The Wedding To-Do List"	July 30, 2015	0.335
Brandon and Michaela keep planning their wedding; Lawson gets his wisdom teeth extracted.
10	"Erin's Little Miracle"	August 6, 2015	0.319
After three miscarriages, Chad and Erin welcome their first son into the world.
11	"Boating With the Bates"	August 13, 2015	0.294
The family go to the lake for an annual vacation and engage in swimming and boating adventures, but thunder arrives and prompts them to take cover.
12	"The Quest for the Dress"	August 20, 2015	0.374
Michaela goes dress shopping for her wedding gown with her mother and sisters, but she struggles to find something she likes.
13	"Addee & Ellie's Pool Party"	August 27, 2015	0.249
Kelly bonds with Trace; Gil and Josie set off on an adventure; Addee and Ellie have a swim party to celebrate both of their birthdays.
14	"Hello Dollywood!"	September 3, 2015	0.197

=== Season 3 (2016) ===
No.	Title	Original release date	U.S. viewers (millions)
1	"Welcome Back Bates"	January 7, 2016	0.351
Michaela shops for her wedding dress. The family heads to Papa Bill's birthdays. Zach and Whitney announce that they are expecting baby #2
2	"Sweet Tea & Sit Ups"	January 14, 2016	0.239
Gil and Kelly decide to enlists Lawson and Tori for work outs.
3	"15 Kids and an Empty Nest"	January 21, 2016	0.246
Gil and Kelly take the little kids for rollerblading and playground. The boys take Brandon ice skating. The girls head to Erin's for candle making.
4	"Headed to the Altar"	January 28, 2016	0.224
As the family gets ready for the wedding, they take a look back at the courtship. We also get to see Zach and Erin's courtship
5	"Wedding Bliss and a First Kiss"	February 4, 2016	0.233
Brandon and Michaela are married.
6	"Fly Fishin' Zip Linin' Honeymoon"	February 11, 2016	0.202
Brandon and Michaela are on their honeymoon while Gil takes the little girls for daddy/daughter time.
7	"Training Wheels and Trick Saddles"	February 18, 2016	0.200
Judson celebrates his birthday, the boys got learn some tricks with the horse. Erin and Chad head to Nashville.
8	"Windy City Newly Weds"	February 25, 2016	0.238
Kelly takes some kids to visit Brandon and Michaela. Zach graduates from the police academy. Later Whitney reveals that she is expecting a little girl.
9	"Beaches, Boats, and Bates"	March 3, 2016	0.253
The family is heading to Florida to enjoy some time in the sun!
10	"Back Seat Bates"	March 10, 2016	0.252
Zach takes the family to the police academy where they get to ride, do a course and learn about guns. Chad and Erin design the Christmas cover and Lawson sings for the children at the hospital. Also Chad and Erin are expecting a little girl.
11	"Time to Renobate!"	March 17, 2016	N/A
The girls redo their bedroom now that three girls have left. Zach and Whitney finished redoing their living room with a new couch.
12	"Bringing Up Bradley!"	March 24, 2016	N/A
Bradley turns one. Kelly goes overboard on shopping for Bradley's first birthday. Whitney shares an announcement at the birthday party!
13	"Love in the Heir"	March 31, 2016	N/A
Gil and Kelly celebrate their anniversary. Zach and Whitney check on their baby. Nathan talks about courting Ashley.
14	"The Big Apple of Nathan's Eye"	April 7, 2016	N/A
Nathan and Ashley start their courtship. Zach and Whitney revealed the sex of their second child.

=== Season 4 (2016) ===
No.	Title	Original release date	U.S. viewers (millions)
1	"Big Family, Big Changes"	June 2, 2016	N/A
Gil gets ready for surgery while the family holds down the fort. Zach and Whitney share their baby's name.
2	"Bates Boy Birthday Bash"	June 9, 2016	N/A
Trace and Jeb celebrate their birthdays with the boys.
3	"A Lovely Day"	June 16, 2016	N/A
The whole family gathers to celebrate Valentine's Day. Chad and Erin announce baby #2 to the family. Nathan and Ashley share an update on their courtship. The family meets Bobby (Tori's boyfriend).
4	"Sunshine State Bates"	June 23, 2016	N/A
John and Alyssa reveal what they do for a living. John plays softball with his family. Back in Tennessee, The boys finished the fort.
5	"Tough Decisions and Large Ambitions"	June 30, 2016	N/A
Nathan announces his break up with Ashley while Lawson talks about his music. The boys cut wood and Gil accidentally runs over Judson's bike.
6	"The Big Chili"	July 7, 2016	N/A
The family performs at a Volunteer Fire Department Chili Fundraiser.
7	"The Great Bates Clean-Up"	July 14, 2016	N/A
The family spring cleans their house. Gil gets sentimental about getting rid of things.
8	"Bloopers, Outtakes and Mishaps, Oh My!"	July 21, 2016	N/A
Taking a look back and highlighting the funniest things the Bates kids have done.
9	"Birthdays and Boyfriends"	July 28, 2016	N/A
Allie Jane and Carlin share a big birthday bash back in Florida. Kelly Jo and Gil meet Tori's boyfriend's family.
10	"Who's In Charge?"	August 4, 2016	N/A
The Bates kids are in charge while Kelly Jo and Gil take a much needed vacation; a movie night at Zach and Whitney's house.
11	"Bates Make the Grade"	August 11, 2016	N/A
Trace and Carlin get their high school diplomas; Kelly falls ill while planning the graduation party.
12	"The 20th Bates"	August 18, 2016	N/A
The 20th Bates contest winner embarks on a day-in-the-life of a Bates from doing chores to riding horses.
13	"Growing Paine"	August 25, 2016	N/A
Grandbaby Carson is turning one with a celebration; Erin hosts the party while Kelly arrives with the party's entertainment.
14	"Bates Dish It Out"	September 1, 2016	N/A
A no-limits buffet entices the hungry Bates clan; Lawson acquires a high-profile duet partner; Emily Ann Roberts, a former finalist on "The Voice".
15	"You Can't Spell Paintball without PAIN"	September 15, 2016	N/A
Jackson is turning 14 and helps on a tree job; Erin and Chad record a new lullaby CD; the guys play paintball to celebrate Jackson's birthday.
16	"Three Pointers and Puppies"	September 22, 2016	N/A
The Bates boys go to basketball camp; a competition between the brothers; Chad and Erin look for a new puppy.
17	"Meet Kaci Lynn Bates!"	September 29, 2016	N/A
The family gets ready for Kaci Lynn's arrival; Whitney gets an ultrasound and finds out the baby is breach.
18	"SUPERSIZED: Extra Paine"	October 6, 2016	N/A
Jackson's paintball party and a visit from Meemaw.
19	"Muddy Buddies"	October 13, 2016	N/A
The family goes on a messy adventure mudding on four wheelers; the weather takes an unexpected turn; Michaela and Brandon come into town to meet the Bates' newest member, Kaci Lynn.
20	"Nashville Nights & Country Campouts"	October 20, 2016	N/A
Lawson shines up his boots for a gig in Nashville; Jackson, Warden and Isaiah camp out in their favorite spot; Lawson takes the stage at a venue in Nashville.
21	"And Baby Makes Five?"	October 27, 2016	N/A
Erin and Chad are days away from meeting their little girl; Erin heads to Nashville to finish her lullaby album; Erin and Chad get a puppy.
22	"SUPERSIZED: Extra Birthday Bash"	November 3, 2016	N/A
More birthday fun with Jeb and Trace.
23	"SUPERSIZED: Extra Chili"	November 10, 2016	N/A
Get more from the Bates as they attend an event at the fire station that saved Addallee's life when she was a baby.
24	"SUPERSIZED: Extra Birthdays and More Boyfriends"	December 29, 2016	N/A
The girls' birthday party and Tori's new boyfriend.
25	"Year End Special"	December 29, 2016	N/A
The Bates reveal their favorite moment from the past four seasons.

=== Season 5 (2017) ===
No.	Title	Original release date	U.S. viewers (millions)
1	"Summer Lovin', Guitar Strummin' and a Surprise a Comin'!"	January 5, 2017	0.227
In the fifth-season opener, the Bates head to North Carolina to pick up Warden, Jackson and Isaiah from camp, and Tori's boyfriend gives the family a special tour of camp. Alyssa surprised the family with news that she was pregnant with Lexi Mae.
2	"Plans, Bands and Mashed Potatoes!"	January 12, 2017	0.278
Kelly is about to turn the big 5-0; the Bates boys try to figure out if they can install a real court in their yard; Lawson invites his Band over for a practice in the living room.
3	"A Birthday and a Birdie"	January 19, 2017	0.221
Katie receives a purity ring; Mama Jane meets the babies; Kelly and Gil share good news about their new congregation location; three Bates men compete for bragging rights on the golf course.
4	"Doggy Dilemmas"	January 26, 2017	N/A
Erin and Chad have their hands full; puppy training; checking in on newlyweds, Michaela and Brandon, and their life in Chicago.
5	"Surprise! Kelly Jo's Big 5-0!"	February 2, 2017	0.239
Kelly's 50th Birthday Party is planned; Gil takes Kelly Jo on a romantic getaway to Chattanooga, TN, or so she thinks.
6	"I Donut Know What I'd Do Without You!"	February 9, 2017	0.234
The Bates visit Florida so that Tori can spend time with Bobby, who has a big surprise for her.
7	"Shakeups, Steaks, and Showtime!"	February 16, 2017	N/A
Lawson releases a CD of original songs and gears up for his first big tour; Zach and Whitney finally get a much deserved date night.
8	"Sweet Home Spartanburg"	February 23, 2017	0.240
Kelly takes the whole family back to her hometown, Spartanburg, South Carolina, to continue her milestone birthday celebration; Kelly shows the kids the house she grew up in, her high school alma mater and introduces them to her childhood friends.
9	"Fire Trucks and Diaper Dumps"	March 2, 2017	0.256
The Bates household faces an unexpected emergency when a house fire erupts in the laundry room; Kelly spends some quality time with Michaela in Chicago, before they depart for Alyssa's baby shower in Florida; Alyssa's Diaper Pounding.
10	"Loads of Laundry and Lots of Lessons"	March 9, 2017	0.249
The Bates temporarily relocate to a hotel after a house fire; the Bates head to the Ark Encounter; the younger boys learn important life lessons when Gil and Kelly try to help them understand the true dangers and consequences a fire can have.
11	"Bike Racks, Barbers & Big Duets!"	March 16, 2017	N/A
Lawson's album release tour is in full swing and the next stop is Mount Airy, NC; Lawson and Nathan visit the iconic sights of the Real Mayberry; Gil teaches the younger boys how to build a bike rack out of logs.
12	"Mass-a-somethin'"	March 23, 2017	0.242
The Bates family is hitting the slopes; after ski lessons, the family decides to head down the mountain on their own.
13	"Working Up An Appetite"	March 30, 2017	0.194
The family completes their Basketball court; Carlin and Josie experience a pain-filled escapade when they get their wisdom teeth pulled out.
14	"The Cubs Land in Chicago!"	April 6, 2017	N/A
It's a Windy City adventure for the younger Bates boys; Gil and Kelly are in Australia; Josie is following in her sister's footsteps and taking college courses.
15	"New Baby Born and Love All Around!, A"	April 13, 2017	0.232
Gil, Kelly, and the kids head to Florida to await the arrival of Alyssa and John's second child, Lexi Mae; Alyssa checks in at the birthing center for a checkup; the Bates sisters come together for a spa day and dish about Carlin's new boyfriend.

=== Season 6 (2017) ===
No.	Title	Original release date	U.S. viewers (millions)
1	"Summer of Love"	June 1, 2017	0.210
Love is blooming for the Bates, with Carlin finding a special friend in Evan and Tori and Bobby deepening their bond; the married couples have big news, especially Erin and Chad.
2	"Road Trip Romance"	June 8, 2017	N/A
Carlin and Katie hit the road to spend some quality time with Carlin's Songwriting Suitor, Evan, and his family; Evan and the girls have some fun at the indoor skating park and the young couple work on a special song for Evan's family.
3	"Bobby's Movin' In"	June 15, 2017	0.247
Bobby and Tori are making plans for the future; Bobby is hoping to move from Florida to Tennessee to be closer to Tori; Bobby interviews for jobs and looks for a place to live; Kelly takes the boys to a martial arts class.
4	"Sibling Revelry"	June 22, 2017	N/A
Erin, Tori, Carlin, Whitney, Josie and Katie join together for a self defense class and engage in a little friendly competition; Gil gathers the kiddos for a "Car 101" lesson; double date night for the married couples.
5	"He Said, She Shed"	June 29, 2017	N/A
Gil must clean the shed when Kelly Jo cashes in on her "I Love You Day" gift from him, but this project is no easy task; Nathan gets sidetracked; Carlin paints lines on the new basketball court; Trace plays a pickup game with a few college players.
6	"Newlywed Edition"	July 6, 2017	0.216
The younger Bates couples see how well they know their respective partners.
7	"Don't Worry, We've Goat This!"	July 13, 2017	0.204
Erin and Chad have expanded their family with twin pygmy goats, but having extra kids means more household chores; Gil and the younger kids stop by to help paint the goats' new shed; Gil and the kids reconfigure a safer design for the zip line.
8	"Stop, Drop and Wash"	July 20, 2017	N/A
The Bates Family organizes a car-washing fundraiser to give back to the heroic volunteer firefighters who responded to their emergency situation; Zach gives a tutorial on the do's and don'ts of properly washing a car.
9	"MORE Bloopers, Outtakes and Mishaps, Oh My!"	July 27, 2017	N/A
A look back at some of the funniest and wackiest things the Bates kids have said and done, updated with even more fun clips and mishaps.
10	"Lawson and Sadie's Big Breakup"	August 3, 2017	0.211
Lawson takes the next step with his career and makes a music video, co-starring actress Sadie Robertson; Kelly thinks it's time the middle boys receive a manners lesson so they can become gentlemen.
11	"One Cap, Two Gowns?"	August 10, 2017	0.282
Bobby's big graduation party; a few rounds of disc golf; Bobby and Tori discuss their future together; Josie gets the chance to spend some time with Kelton.
12	"The Night The Lights Went Out in Tennessee"	August 17, 2017	N/A
Now that Nathan is a certified flight instructor, he's moved back to Rocky Top, TN to teach flight lessons; Kacie Lynn is turning the big One; a power outage leads to an impromptu slumber party and game night.
13	"The Fabulous Backwoods Bates Boys"	August 24, 2017	N/A
Zach organizes a camping trip in hopes of having some bonding moments with his brothers; Zach gets an unexpected call; Kelly, Erin, and Whitney gather up the younger kiddos for a swimming lesson.
14	"Here's the scoop!"	August 31, 2017	N/A
Kelly, Erin, Carson, and Tori head to Chicago to visit Michaela and Brandon and take in a few sights; Carlin, Josie and Katie are on babysitting duty while mom's away.
15	"Courtship, Kiddos, and Future Son-In-Laws?"	September 7, 2017	N/A
The family is headed to an adventure resort on the rim of West Virginia's New River Gorge; Tori's down in the dumps because Bobby won't be joining her on this trip; Carlin is extra excited to have her boyfriend Evan along for the ride.
16	"Uncharted Waters"	September 14, 2017	N/A
The Bates family continues their thrill seeking vacation at Adventures on the Gorge, in West Virginia; a high level white water rafting course; Gil is in for a big surprise when Bobby pulls him aside.

=== Season 7 (2018) ===
No.	Title	Original release date	U.S. viewers (millions)
1	"The 4 C's: Carat, Clarity, Carlin & Courtship"	January 4, 2018	N/A
Evan has the green light to officially court Carlin, he puts his courtship proposal plan in motion; Bobby makes a stop at a jewelry store in Florida; Josie celebrates a milestone birthday.
2	"Decorating Dilemmas and Job Decisions"	January 11, 2018	N/A
Michaela and Brandon move out of their one-bedroom apartment and into a new house; Kelly and Erin pay the young couple a visit to lend a hand with decorating their new space; Chad offers is job to Bobby.
3	"Bobby's Happy Camper"	January 18, 2018	N/A
Bobby finally makes the big move to Rocky Top, Tenn., so he can be closer to Tori; before he touches down in Tennessee, he stops by a Florida jewelry store to pick up Tori's engagement ring.
4	"Sun Day, Fun Day"	January 25, 2018	N/A
In anticipation of the total solar eclipse, Brandon gives the Bates kids an interactive science lesson, demonstrating how the moon blocks the sun. The family adopts a new dog.
5	"Erin's surprise takes the cake"	February 1, 2018	N/A
Erin reveals unexpected news to her husband, Chad; Whitney balances motherhood with her new career as a realtor; Whitney gets advice from her new boss; Trace practices basketball drills with his college buddies.
6	"The best is Yet to come"	February 8, 2018	N/A
While Tori is eager for Bobby to pop the question, he is struggling to come up with the perfect proposal plan, so he turns to Gil and Kelly Jo for advice.
7	"Bates Sports Special"	February 15, 2018	N/A
The best Bates sports moments are highlighted.
8	"Fan favorite Clips"	February 22, 2018	N/A
A countdown of the top 25 most viewed clips.
9	"Save the Date and Decisions to Make!"	March 1, 2018	N/A
Now that Tori and Bobby are officially engaged, they're hoping to move up their wedding date; for Nathan's birthday party, the Bates brothers hit the water for some fun in the sun; in wedding planning mode, Tori hunts for a wedding dress.
10	"Icing on the Cakes"	March 8, 2018	N/A
Kelly Jo assembles a wedding planning team; Tori desires a winter wonderland wedding; Lawson, Nathan and Trace spend some time at the ranch, catching up and riding horses; Isaiah celebrates his 13th birthday with an epic laser-tag battle.
11	"Big Decision, Bigger Opinions"	March 15, 2018	N/A
The entire family gathers for a family picnic; Gil discovers some mysterious envelopes; Kelly Jo, Tori and her sisters meet up at Renee's Bridal Shop to try on customized bridesmaid and wedding dresses.
12	"Fixin' For New Beginnings"	March 22, 2018	N/A
The Bates and the Paines are ready to renovate; subcontractor Chad works on a fixer upper; Erin provides input on interior decorating; Zach and Whitney make a decision to buy a home that needs some work.
13	"Can You Have a Wedding Shower Without the Bride & Groom?"	March 29, 2018	N/A
Gil takes Tori out for special father/daughter outing; now that Josie is working toward her cosmetology license, Whitney takes Kaci Lynn to her aunt for her very first hair cut.
14	"Beach Blanket Bachelorette!"	April 5, 2018	N/A
Kelly Jo and her sisters have planned a bachelorette beach getaway for the bride-to-be; Bobby recruits some of the younger Bates boys to help him move out of the camper.
15	"Another Beautiful Season of Blessings"	April 12, 2018	N/A
The Bates head to South Carolina for their annual Thanksgiving tradition with Papa Bill and Mama Jane; Josie and Kelton try to gather the courage to ask Gil and Kelly Jo's permission to officially court.
16	"Countdown to 'I Do'"	April 19, 2018	N/A
Tori has her final wedding dress fitting and she sits down with Carlin to come up with a hairstyle for her special day; Gil, Nathan, and the middle boys get to work on cutting and trimming trees for Tori and Bobby's winter wonderland wedding decor.
17	"Tori's Winter Wonderland Wedding"	April 26, 2018	N/A
At Christmastime, the family hustles to take care of last-minute winter wonderland decorations for Tori and Bobby's wedding day; when the big day arrives, everyone is full of emotion, especially Gil as he prepares to give his daughter away.
18	"A Heavenly Honeymoon & A Courtship Countdown"	June 7, 2018	N/A
After a picture-perfect wedding ceremony, Tori and Bobby head out for their honeymoon; upon arriving in California, the newlyweds take a romantic drive along the Pacific Coast Highway and set sail for a picturesque boat ride on the Monterey Bay.
19	"Eye Love You Day!"	June 14, 2018	N/A
Kelly Jo gets eye surgery to correct her vision; the family prepares for this year's I Love You Day festivities; the growing old together theme may lead to some unexpected costumes, while the single Bates boys may finally secure a seat at the table.
20	"Seas the Day!"	June 21, 2018	N/A
Now that many of the older girls have moved out of the house, it's Carlin's turn to tutor her younger siblings; Gil and the family head to Myrtle Beach, S.C., so the children can meet Mama Jane's side of the family for the first time.

=== Season 8 (2019) ===
No.	Title	Original release date	U.S. viewers (millions)
1	"Ultrasounds, Wedding Vows & a Bride to Be?"	January 3, 2019	N/A
Newly engaged Josie is planning her fall wedding; Tori and Bobby are expecting their first child; happily married couple Zach and Whitney are renewing their vows; and Carlin's still head over heels for Evan.
2	"Big Apple Bride"	January 10, 2019	N/A
Josie finds her dream wedding dress online, but must travel to New York City to try it on.
3	"A Proposal to Plan & Wedding To-Do's!"	January 17, 2019	N/A
Evan meets with Kelly Jo and Erin to think of wedding proposal ideas.
4	"A Sweet Shower & a Surprise Switch!"	January 24, 2019	N/A
Josie and Kelly Jo are headed back to New York City so Josie can try on the wedding dress she selected one final time.
5	"The Maine Event"	January 31, 2019	N/A
Evan prepares a fairytale proposal to Carlin.
6	"Bate & Switch"	February 7, 2019	N/A
Katie's family celebrate her 18th birthday with pizza and ice cream. Later, Kelton and Josie look for an apartment.
7	"A Bride, a Groom and a Love That's True!"	February 14, 2019	N/A
The countdown to Josie and Kelton's wedding ceremony begins. After needing several alterations to her dream wedding dress, Josie tries on her dress one final time before the big day.
8	"Newlyweds: Rookies vs. Pros"	February 21, 2019	N/A
Spouses attempt to answer questions regarding their husbands or wives.
9	"A Latte Love!"	February 28, 2019	N/A
Josie and Kelton go to Asheville, North Carolina, for their honeymoon.
10	"A Wedding to Plan & Fun With the Fam!"	March 7, 2019	N/A
Alyssa, Michaela, Erin, Whitney and Kelly Jo meet up with the grandchildren for a catch up and playdate.
11	"Nashville Nursery Makeover"	March 14, 2019	N/A
Bobby and Tori count down the days to the arrival of baby Kade.
12	"A Newlywed Nest & Trace Put to the Test"	March 21, 2019	N/A
Josie and Kelton's honeymoon might be over but the fun is just beginning. Now it's time to settle into their new apartment. While Kelton is away at work, Josie recruits her friend and Whitney to help her decorate their living room.
13	"A Proposal to Remember & a Baby on the Way"	March 28, 2019	N/A
To celebrate their 5th anniversary, Erin and Chad take a romantic getaway to their proposal spot.
14	"Ready or Not, Baby Kade Is on His Way!"	April 4, 2019	N/A
To celebrate Zach's 30th birthday, the guys hit the road for some bonding time and fun in the mud. But in between four wheeling and skeet shooting, Gil gets news from Kelly Jo that baby Kade is on his way.
15	"It's a Boy & Maybe One More?"	April 11, 2019	N/A
Gil, Carlin, Lawson, and Erin try to arrive at the hospital before Tori gives birth.
16	"A Very Medieval "I Love You Day""	September 19, 2019	N/A
"I Love You Day" is here and the Bates crew gathers for an elaborate "Chivalry" themed party with food, games and amazing costumes. Before the big event, Kelly Jo and the girls decorate for the party and get caught up on all the family news like Carlin and Evan's wedding plans, Trace's romantic prospect and the news that Michaela and Brandon might be moving to Tennessee. Meanwhile, the Bates boys hit the slopes for the day in a "Battle of the Brothers".
17	"A Blushing Bride to Be!"	September 26, 2019	N/A
Kelly Jo, Carlin, and Erin go to Nashville to find Carlin's wedding dress.
18	"A Dance With Dad & a Wedding to Plan!"	October 3, 2019	N/A
Carlin has the perfect dress and thinks she may have found the perfect venue. Meanwhile, Gil, Zach, Nathan, and the kids work on building the new puppy a dog house that will either be a dog house of dreams or another unfinished Bates project. Later, with Michaela and Brandon thinking about moving back to Tennessee, they check out a rental property in Norris, Tennessee.
19	"A Baby Grand Plan!"	October 10, 2019	N/A
Carlin has the perfect wedding venue but needs to start nailing down all the details including decorations and a game plan in case it rains on her special day!
20	"Shall We Dance?"	October 17, 2019	N/A
Erin and Chad are teaming up and combining skills to work on a project together!
21	"New Beginnings"	October 24, 2019	N/A
Erin, Whitney, and Carlin team up to start an online store selling casual, modest dresses. Starting a business from the ground up isn't easy, however, and it will take everything they have not to give up before they get started.
22	"Baby Mamas and Bridesmaids Drama"	November 7, 2019	N/A
Whitney and Zach are ready to share some happy news with the rest of the family - they have baby number 3 on the way!
23	"Home Is Where the Heart Is!"	November 14, 2019	N/A
As their wedding day gets closer and closer, Carlin and Evan get busy fixing up their future home. With all the unpacking, they have to try to find the time to finish writing the duet they plan to sing at the ceremony.
24	"A Wedding Worth the Wait"	November 21, 2019	N/A
Carlin's fairytale wedding is just days away. Emotions are running high and the clock is ticking. Later, the big day has finally arrived. Carlin gets ready to walk down the aisle, as she and Gil share a sweet and tearful first look moment. After being pronounced husband and wife, the couple make their way to the reception, where they share a romantic dance together and Carlin has a heartfelt dance with her dad.

=== Season 9 (2020) ===
No.	Title	Original release date	U.S. viewers (millions)
1	"A First Time For Everything"	March 5, 2020	N/A
2	"A Busy Business and a Baby Bombshell"	March 12, 2020	N/A
3	"First Home and Strict Chaperones!"	March 19, 2020	N/A
4	"Happy News and Health Concerns"	March 26, 2020	N/A
5	"Texas or Bust?"	April 2, 2020	N/A
6	"Surgery and Surprises"	April 9, 2020	N/A
7	"A Pizza Katie's Heart"	April 16, 2020	N/A
8	"A Great Bates Getaway"	April 23, 2020	N/A
9	"Nesting Mode & Mommies on a Mission!"	April 30, 2020	N/A
10	"Taking Care of Business & Florida Fun"	May 7, 2020	N/A
11	"Brandon's Book and Kelly Jo's New Look"	May 14, 2020	N/A
12	"Holiday Cheer and New Baby Khloe is Here!"	May 21, 2020	N/A
13	"Holiday Traditions and Baby Additions!"	May 28, 2020	N/A
14	"Roaring Bates and Pending Due Dates"	July 23, 2020	N/A
15	"A Double Date & Something to Celebrate!"	July 30, 2020	N/A
16	"Beauty and the Business"	August 6, 2020	N/A
17	"I Love You to Piz-zas!"	August 13, 2020	N/A
18	"The Show Must Go On!"	August 20, 2020	N/A
19	"Baby Boy Blessings & Basketball Mishaps"	August 27, 2020	N/A
20	"Shelter in Bates"	September 3, 2020	N/A
21	"A Promise Ring and Unexpected Delivery!"	September 10, 2020	N/A
22	"A Day for Dads!"	September 17, 2020	N/A

=== Season 10 (2021) ===
No.	Title	Original release date	U.S. viewers (millions)
1	"He or She, What Will the Baby Be?"	April 8, 2021	N/A
2	"Smitten in the Smoky Mountains"	April 15, 2021	N/A
3	"Nathan's New Romance and a Secret Birthday Bash"	April 22, 2021	N/A
4	"'Tis the Season for Surprises"	April 29, 2021	N/A
5	"Home Sweet Home & Nathan's Love!"	May 13, 2021	N/A
6	"A DIY Date and a Delivery Day"	May 20, 2021	N/A
7	"Lawson's New Love and the Boutique's New Digs!"	May 27, 2021	0.271
12	"Due Dates & An Engagement Getaway!"	June 24, 2021	0.319
