= Aspire TV (American TV network) =

American pay television channel

Aspire
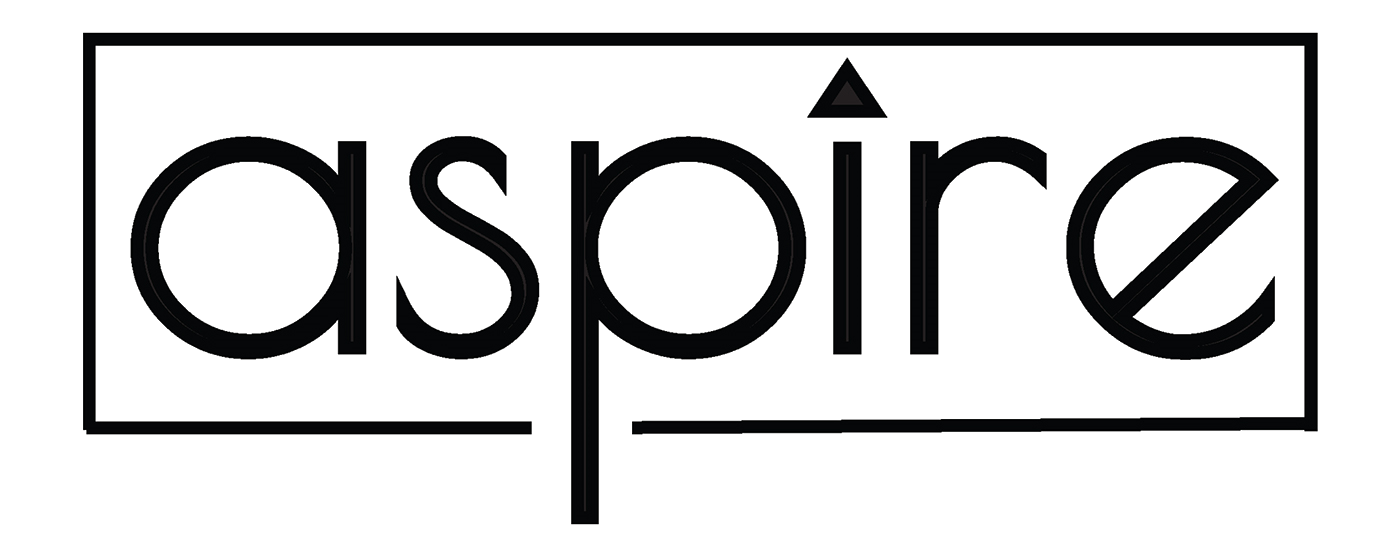
- Country: United States
- Broadcast area: United States
- Headquarters: Atlanta, Georgia

Programming
- Picture format: 1080i HDTV (downscaled to letterboxed 480i for the SDTV feed)

Ownership
- Owner: Up Entertainment
- Sister channels: Up TV

History
- Launched: June 27, 2012; 14 years ago
- Former names: Aspire (2012–2018)

Links
- Website: www.aspire.tv

aspireTV is an American cable television channel targeting African Americans. The network was launched by Magic Johnson on June 27, 2012. AspireTV is the television network that celebrates and reflects Black life, style and culture in a way that is inspiring, authentic and entertaining . In addition to fan-favorite comedies and movies, aspireTV invites viewers to “see yourself here” with series focused on food, travel, home design and fashion, as well as the passion and pride of HBCUs.

In 2019, Johnson divested his majority ownership after 10 year. aspireTV is now owned by UP Entertainment under the leadership of Senior VP of Multicultural Networks and Strategy Angela Cannon. In a 2022 interview, Cannon shared that aspireTV was “number one in affinity within Black lifestyle networks.”

In 2024, aspireTV launched AspireTV+ on Prime Video Channels. AspireTV+ is a new subscription streaming service for Black culture and urban lifestyle entertainment. From fashion and beauty to food and travel, there's a diverse selection of original programs, movies, series, independent films and documentaries.

AspireTV is under the UP Entertainment brand. In addition to AspireTV, UP Entertainment is home to UP Faith & Family, UPtv, aspireTV+, GaitherTV+ and Cine Romántico.

AspireTV launched an app for iOS and Android phones in summer 2024 featuring reminders, a channel finder and the Tribe Talk blog highlighting weekly updates in news, entertainment, business, sports and Black history.

AspireTV is available through a variety of sources including cable providers, nationally on DirecTV and for streaming on DirecTV Stream or Philo.

AspireTV Studios is a purpose-driven business development strategy committed to supporting a more diverse and equitable creative supply chain. Together with Sunwise Media, a certified Minority Business Enterprise (MBE), aspireTV Studios will source and connect advertisers with diverse owned media, content creation, full-service production and distribution across cable, satellite and streaming platforms.

== History ==
As part of its arrangement to acquire a minority interest in NBCUniversal, Comcast Corporation committed to carry several minority-owned channels. The arrangement followed pressure led by Maxine Waters in congressional hearings. In April 2011, Comcast solicited proposals for minority-owned networks. In February 2012, Comcast announced distribution arrangements for four networks, including Aspire. The four announced networks and six forthcoming stations were chosen from among an excess of 100 proposals to begin airing by 2020.

In 2019, Magic Johnson had divested his majority ownership, with UP Entertainment gaining it.

== Programming ==
Aspire TV holds the broadcast rights to a selection of CIAA college football games involving historically black colleges and universities.

=== Current ===
- 6 Minutes To Glory: The HBCU Band Experience
- 227
- The Bernie Mac Show
- Chaos to Calm
- City Eats: Atlanta
- Cut to It
- Downright Delicious with Yo-Yo
- Family Time
- G. Garvin Live
- Harlem Globetrotters: Secrets Of The City
- HBCU 101
- Hustle, Sizzle and Smoke
- Keasha's Perfect Dress
- Mann & Wife
- Money Moves
- Style Kings
- The Steve Harvey Show
- Twisted Dish
- Unboxed with Nikki Chu
- Urban Indie Film Block

=== Former ===
- Black College Quiz
- The Bill Cosby Show
- Butter+Brown
- The Flip Wilson Show
- The Graduates ATL
- The Hughleys
- In Living Color
- In the House
- I Spy
- Julia
- Just Angela
- Lincoln Heights
- The Mod Squad
- My Wife and Kids
- Room 222
- Side by Side With Malika & Khadijah
- Soul Food
- Soul Train
- Whose Line Is It Anyway?
- World Wide Nate: African Adventures

== See also ==
- BET – American basic cable and satellite channel currently owned by Paramount, which launched in 1980 as the first television network devoted to programming targeting African-Americans.
  - BET Her – spinoff/sister network targeting African-American women.
- Bounce TV – American digital multicast network owned by E. W. Scripps Company.
- TheGrio – American digital multicast/cable network owned by Allen Media Group
- TV One – Cable and satellite network targeting African-Americans, owned by Urban One.
  - Cleo TV – Spinoff/sister network targeting African-American women.
