= Katie Davis =

Katie or Katy Davis may refer to:

- Katie Davis (missionary) (born 1989), missionary and author
- 19766 Katiedavis, an asteroid
- Katie Davis (judoka) (born 1986), American Paralympic judoka
- Katy Davis, actress in My Friend Joe

== See also ==
- Kate Davis (born 1991), American voice actress
- Kate Davis (director) (born 1960s), American director
- Katherine Davis (disambiguation)
