= Quest Red =

Digital television channel in the UK

- Logo used since 13 January 2026
- Country: United Kingdom

Programming
- Picture format: 16:9 576i SDTV
- Timeshift service: Quest Red +1

Ownership
- Owner: Warner Bros. Discovery EMEA
- Sister channels: Quest

History
- Launched: 15 March 2017; 9 years ago

Links
- Website: discoveryplus.com/gb/channel/quest-red

Availability

Terrestrial
- Freeview: Channel 40

Streaming media
- Discovery+: Watch live

Quest Red is a British free-to-air television channel in the United Kingdom broadcasting primarily ID programming aimed at a female audience. The channel is operated by Skydance Corporation and runs as a sibling to Discovery's established Freeview channel Quest, launched in 2009.

== History ==
In mid-February 2017, shortly after the completion of an eleventh-hour carriage deal with Sky to retain a presence on the satellite platform for its current and future channels, Discovery Communications head David Zaslav told a corporate conference call that a second Freeview channel, to sit alongside Quest, would launch during 2017.

The following day, more details of the channel were confirmed, including its name and branding (which will include a red version of the Quest 'Q' channel symbol), content (some of which will be shared with sibling channels such as ID and TLC), and launch date of 15 March.

The station will be available as a free-to-air channel on the Freeview platform (and, by extension, to users of the BT and TalkTalk's YouView platforms), and on the subscription satellite and cable platforms operated by Sky and Virgin Media in the UK and the Republic of Ireland.

At launch, the channel was, like Quest, encrypted on satellite and thus not available on Freesat. Quest and Quest Red removed their encryption and began broadcasting free-to-air over satellite in June 2017, and were added to the Freesat guide early in July.

A full one-hour timeshifted variant of Quest Red was launched on the Sky platform in tandem with the launch of the principal channel. From 14 June 2017, Quest Red +1 was made available to Freeview users for three hours a day in the early morning, taking over the capacity vacated by the earlier relocation of Quest +1 to a different, longer slot. On 28 November 2017, Quest Red +1 launched on Freesat.

Unlike Sky & Freesat, Quest Red +1 is not on Virgin Media. It used to be available on Freeview until November 2022, when it was removed to make way for Quest moving to the COM6 multiplex.

At launch, Quest Red wasn't available to Sky Ireland and Northern Ireland viewers due to a carriage agreement with RTÉ that allowed RTÉ One and RTÉ2 to be available on the EPG in Northern Ireland and also that the channel was channel 162 in the British guide. As part of Sky's major EPG reshuffle on 1 May 2018, Quest Red (and +1) became available to both Ireland and Northern Ireland customers, in addition to moving to 149 for Great Britain customers, a slot they acquired from ITV Digital Channels, who previously had ITVBe on that slot apart from regions where STV is on channel 103.

As of 2025, Quest Red now premieres new ID programming from the US channel.

=== Launch ===
Advance listings information indicated that the first programme screened on the channel would be an episode of Homes Under the Hammer. Ahead of broadcast, this was changed: Extreme Couponing, which had initially been due to follow HUtH in the schedule, was brought forward to 10 am, with HUtH following at 11 am.

A placeholder for Quest Red was made available on the Virgin Media platform early in the morning of 15 March, ahead of the channel's launch; the new channel was added to the Sky programme guide at approximately 10:45 am on launch day in Great Britain only, and to Freeview from noon. A number of other changes to services on the Freeview platform were made simultaneously with the addition of Quest Red, including a reduction in the broadcast hours of Quest +1, which also moved down the programme guide to release LCN 38 to Quest Red.

== Programming ==
- 60 Minute Makover with Peter Andre
- Animal Cops
- Bondi Vet
- Cake Boss
- Disappeared
- Evil Lives Here
- Extreme Couponing
- Forbidden: Dying for Love
- Ghost Asylum
- Jo Frost: Nanny On Tour
- Katie Price: My Crazy Life
- Long Lost Family US
- Gypsy Brides US
- Homes Under the Hammer
- House of Horrors: Kidnapped
- Is O.J. Innocent? The Missing Evidence
- Leah Remini: Scientology and the Aftermath
- Long Island Medium
- Martin Kemp's Detective
- My Naked Secret
- My 600-lb Life
- Nightmare Next Door
- The Nolans Go Cruising
- Paranormal Lockdown
- Salvage Hunters
- Say Yes to the Dress
- Scorned: Love Kills
- Southern Fried Homicide
- True Crime with Aphrodite Jones
- Vogue Williams Investigates

== Logos ==
Quest Red logo used from 15 March 2017 – 17 April 2020

2017 version without checkpoint used from 5 July 2018 – 6 April 2020

Quest Red logo used from 7 April 2020 – 12 January 2026

Quest Red logo used since 13 January 2026

== See also ==
- Quest
