= Catherine Davies =

Catherine Davies or similar may refer to:

- Catherine Davies (governess) (1773–after 1841), Governess in Naples who sold her story in a book
- Catherine Glyn Davies (1926–2007), Welsh historian of philosophy and linguistics
- Katharine Davies (born 1968), British writer of romance novels
- Kathryn Davies, wife of Andrew Adonis, Baron Adonis

== See also ==
- Katherine Davis (disambiguation)
- Davies
