= 6 Little McGhees =

American reality television series

- Genre: Reality
- Starring: Mia McGhee; Rozonno McGhee
- Country of origin: United States
- Original language: English
- No. of seasons: 3
- No. of episodes: 31

Production
- Executive producers: Joe Sorge; Philip Sternberg
- Running time: 20–22 minutes
- Production company: Candor Entertainment

Original release
- Network: Oprah Winfrey Network
- Release: December 15, 2012 – October 18, 2014

6 Little McGhees is an American reality television series that debuted on December 15, 2012, on the Oprah Winfrey Network (OWN) that is based on the popular 1960s song "Seven Little Girl's (Sitting in the Backseat, Kissing and Hugging with Freddie McGhee)

On June 8, 2016, the show returned on UP under the new title Growing Up McGhee airing on Wednesdays at 9 pm.

== Premise ==
The series follows the day-to-day lives of Mia and Rozonno McGhee, along with their household, as they balance life between their six children, marriage and a family business. The McGhees own and operate a carpet and upholstery cleaning business in their hometown of Columbus, Ohio. The couple, who met while in high school, both come from deprived backgrounds; they both suffered emotional abuse and physical neglect. Rozonno grew up without any contact from his father and with a drug-addicted mother. When Mia was a teenager, her mother threw her out of the family home, forcing the girl to drop out of school to support herself. The McGhees were married for 10 years and suffered several failed pregnancies before they were able to become parents.

== Cast ==
=== Parents ===
- Mia McGhee born November 19, 1980 (age 45)
- Rozonno (Ro) McGhee Sr.-born July 6, 1979 (age 47)

=== Sextuplets (oldest to youngest) ===
Sextuplets born June 9, 2010 (age 16)

- Rozonno Junior (RoRo)
- Issac (Happy Feet)
- Josiah "Joey" (Joe Joe)
- Madison (Maddie)
- Elijah (Eli)
- Olivia "Liv" (Livvy)

=== Family and friends ===
- Charmayne aka Cilky Smooth, Rozonno's mother
- Frank, Rozonno's brother
- Cierra, Mia's niece
- Sonia, Mia's mother
- Tania, Mia's sister
- Cian, Mia's niece
- Yasmin, Mia's niece
- Antonsae aka Boogie, Kids' helper aunt
- Amy, Volunteer Helper
- Cieara, Mia's Friend
- Luke, Manager

== Episodes ==
=== Series overview ===
Season	Episodes	Originally released	
Season	Episodes	First released	Last released
1	7	December 15, 2012	January 5, 2013
2	16	September 7, 2013	December 28, 2013
3	8	September 6, 2014	October 18, 2014

=== Season 1 (2012–13) ===
No. overall	No. in season	Title	Original release date	U.S. viewers (millions)
1	1	"Meet the McGhees"	December 15, 2012	0.82
2	2	"It Takes a Village"	December 22, 2012	0.43
3	3	"We're Going to the Zoo"	December 22, 2012	0.43
4	4	"Never Too Late for Prom"	December 29, 2012	0.62
5	5	"Stuck in the Middle"	December 29, 2012	0.63
6	6	"Family Business"	January 5, 2013	0.45
7	7	"Six Little Birthdays"	January 5, 2013	0.48

=== Season 2 (2013) ===
No. overall	No. in season	Title	Original release date	U.S. viewers (millions)
8	1	"Can't Grow Without Changing"	September 7, 2013	0.68
9	2	"The System"	September 7, 2013	0.79
10	3	"Somebody Has to Go"	September 14, 2013	0.59
11	4	"Six Little Splashers"	September 14, 2013	0.50
12	5	"Smells Like Valentine's Day"	September 21, 2013	N/A
13	6	"It's Potty Time!"	September 21, 2013	N/A
14	7	"Help Wanted"	September 28, 2013	0.59
15	8	"Bowling for Ninos"	September 28, 2013	N/A
16	9	"Growing Pains"	October 5, 2013	N/A
17	10	"No Meat, No Mercy"	October 5, 2013	N/A
18	11	"McGhees in Tiaras"	October 12, 2013	N/A
19	12	"No More Funny Business"	October 19, 2013	N/A
20	13	"Banking on the Future"	October 26, 2013	N/A
21	14	"Abra-Ca-Dentist"	December 28, 2013	N/A
22	15	"Gone Fishing...For Trouble"	December 28, 2013	N/A
23	16	"Gone Fishing...For Trouble: Part 2"	December 28, 2013	N/A

=== Season 3 (2014) ===
No. overall	No. in season	Title	Original release date	U.S. viewers (millions)
24	1	"Pending Approval"	September 6, 2014	N/A
25	2	"Barbells and Ballerinas"	September 6, 2014	N/A
26	3	"Not Enough Hours in the Day"	September 13, 2014	N/A
27	4	"Class Is in Session"	September 20, 2014	N/A
28	5	"Cilky to the Rescue"	September 27, 2014	N/A
29	6	"Chef Ro"	October 4, 2014	N/A
30	7	"Team McGhee"	October 11, 2014	N/A
31	8	"The Heart of the Matter"	October 18, 2014	0.40

== Awards and nominations ==
Year	Award	Category	Result
2014	20th Annual NAMIC Vision Awards	Reality Show	Won
