= Kathryn Davis =

Kathryn Davis may refer to:

- Kathryn Davis (writer) (born 1946), American novelist
- Kathryn C. Davis (born 1978), American judge
- Kathryn Wasserman Davis (1907–2013), American philanthropist
