= Up TV =

American digital cable and satellite television network

- Country: United States
- Headquarters: Atlanta, Georgia

Programming
- Language: English
- Picture format: 1080i (HDTV); 480i (SDTV)

Ownership
- Owner: MediaBox, LLC
- Sister channels: aspireTV

History
- Launched: October 30, 2004 (21 years ago) (as the Gospel Music Channel)
- Former names: Gospel Music Channel (2004–2010); GMC TV (2010–2013)

Links
- Website: uptv.com

Availability

Streaming media
- Philo: Internet protocol television
- DirecTV Stream: Internet protocol television
- Frndly TV: Internet protocol television
- Vidgo: Internet protocol television

UP TV (stylized as UPtv; formerly GMC TV and originally Gospel Music Channel) is an American basic cable television network that was founded by Charles "Charley" Humbard, son of the first televangelist, Rex Humbard, on October 30, 2004, to have a focus on gospel music. It has expanded into family-friendly original movies, series, and specials. UP Entertainment is owned by MediaBox, LLC. The name and logo are a reference to Up Entertainment, one of the channel's content providers.

UPtv now focuses on family-friendly and uplifting programming, including original movies, syndicated series, and theatrical films. Series the network airs include Last Man Standing, Reba, Blue Bloods, Hudson & Rex and Heartland. Past series include Gilmore Girls, Bringing Up Bates, Growing Up McGhee, Whose Line Is It Anyway?, Home Improvement and Little House on the Prairie. UPtv is known for its pro-social initiative, "UPlift Someone", which promotes acts of kindness through social media campaigns and videos.

UPtv is under the UP Entertainment brand. In addition to UPtv, UP Entertainment is home to UP Faith & Family, aspireTV, aspireTV+, GaitherTV+ and Cine Romántico.

UPtv has reported there is an audience of 40 million viewers, who they call UPSIDERS. UPtv reports that the UPSIDERS seek shows that affirm their faith and values, inspire and uplift, and are great to watch with the whole family. The My UPtv app launched in 2020, allows viewers to get notifications and reminders. The network has also launched a new movie tracker app called My UPtv Movies, allowing viewers to get notifications, reminders and updates about holiday content.

As of February 2015, the channel is available to approximately 67.6 million pay television households (58.1% of households with television) in the United States.

== History ==
The Gospel Music Channel was founded in 2004 by Charles Humbard, the son of televangelist Rex Humbard. It was devoted to gospel music. With Brad Siegel, former president of Turner Broadcasting's Turner Entertainment Networks, as vice chairman, Humbard launched GMC on October 30, 2004. Gospel Music Channel programmed gospel/Christian music, featuring diverse styles, including traditional and contemporary gospel, Christian rock and pop, southern gospel, and Christian metal. Each weeknight, the network's lineup featured a different genre of music.

In addition to music video blocks, the network began to produce original shows, such as Faith and Fame (artist biographies), Front Row Live (concerts), and America Sings (singing competition). The network aired Gospel and Christian music industry award shows, including the Stellar Awards (urban gospel) and the GMA Dove Awards.

In March 2013, it was announced that the channel would rebrand from GMC to Up to reflect its current programming strategies, which now focused more broadly on "positive", faith-based, and family-oriented programming (billed with the slogan "Uplifting Entertainment") rather than focusing primarily on gospel music. The rebranding took effect on June 1, 2013.

== Timeline ==
=== 9/11/2001 ===
- While working at Discovery Communications, UP Entertainment Founder and CEO Charles “Charley” Humbard wanted to create a company that uplifts others in after the events of Sept. 11, 2001.

=== 10/30/2004 ===
- Gospel Music Channel launches – becomes fastest-growing network in cable for 5 years.
- Gospel Music Heritage Month is established as a national month of celebration Gospel Music.

=== 2009 ===
- Gospel Music Channel becomes GMC as the channel transforms from music to general uplifting entertainment.

=== 2013 ===
- GMC becomes UPtv and expands the slate of original movies and series.

=== 2020 ===
- The My UPtv Movies App launches.

=== 2022 ===
- UPtv major app revamp and release of version 2 of UPtv app called My UPtv App.

=== 2024 ===
- October 30 – 20 Anniversary of UP Entertainment.
- October 30 – Date established as National UPlift Someone Day through the National Day Archives.
- UPtv achieved a top-50 Nielsen ranking among cable in the third-quarter of 2024.

== Programming ==
In the transition before the name change, in 2010, the channel began carrying syndicated series such as Cosby; Dr. Quinn, Medicine Woman; and The Waltons, along with Judging Amy. The channel also has aired films such as The Secret Garden, The Trial, and Pay It Forward, as well as Christian movies such as Facing the Giants, The Perfect Summer, and Fireproof. On Christmas Eve and Day, the network airs a Yule Log loop with holiday songs from Contemporary Christian artists. Similar to competing family networks such as INSP and Hallmark Channel, Up TV programs multiple weeks of family-friendly Christmas movies through the holidays in December. Easter movies also air on the programming schedule through April.

The channel continues to air popular syndicated series such as Gilmore Girls, America's Funniest Home Videos, Whose Line Is It Anyway?, and Home Improvement. On December 3, 2014, Up announced its first original scripted series under its new branding Ties That Bind, which was canceled after its first season. Ties That Bind starred Kelli Williams, Jonathan Scarfe, Dion Johnstone, Matreya Scarrwene, Rhys Matthew Bond, Natasha Calis, Mitchell Kummen, and guest stars Luke Perry and Jason Priestley. Other original series include Bringing Up Bates and the Canadian import Heartland. UPtv original movies include Love Finds You in Sugarcreek, Ohio (starring Kelly McGillis); The Town That Came A-Courtin' (starring Valerie Harper); Finding Normal; My Mother's Future Husband; Raising Izzie; and Saving Westbrook High. UPtv original specials include K-LOVE Music City Christmas (hosted by Candace Cameron Bure).

On October 7, 2014, UPtv removed their airings of repeats of the television drama 7th Heaven, due to allegations of child molestation against the series lead actor, Stephen Collins. 7th Heaven briefly returned to the network in December 2014; however, it was quickly removed from the schedule. UPtv CEO Charley Humbard explained that they tried to reair the series "because many viewers expressed they could separate allegations against one actor from the fictional series itself. As it turns out, they cannot." In late May 2015, UPtv resumed weekday airings of two episodes of 7th Heaven, from 5 to 7 p.m. ET; by September 2015, marathon and daily airings of the series had resumed.

In September 2015, the network acquired the rights to Gilmore Girls and began to air it in both daily and marathon forms of scheduling, including a full-series marathon on Thanksgiving week 2016 to lead into the series' Netflix revival. It also acquired the rights to rerun NBC's drama Parenthood following the closure of the NickMom block on the Nick Jr. Channel a year earlier, complementing Gilmore Girls, as both series starred actress Lauren Graham.

In April 2016, the channel acquired the rights to rerun the Tom Bergeron era of America's Funniest Home Videos.

In 2017, the network acquired rights to reruns of Whose Line Is It Anyway?, both the ABC/ABC Family run hosted by Drew Carey and the current CW run hosted by Aisha Tyler. Both versions carry content disclaimers depending on episode content.

In May 2018, UPtv acquired reruns of Home Improvement; at around the same time, reruns of this show also began airing on the Viacom-owned cable network CMT, shortly after it suspended airing reruns of Roseanne (which would later returned to that network's schedule). At around this same time, Up TV also quietly removed its "We Get Family" slogan on-air.

In March 2019, UPtv acquired reruns of The Librarians; around the same time, they introduced a new emoji-based campaign and branding. In June 2019, UPtv acquired reruns of Reba, and premiered it on August 2, 2019.

In December 2019, the network acquired reruns of Little House on the Prairie, after INSP's rights to broadcast the series expired. UPtv began airing episodes in sequence from the pilot movie onwards during several marathon airings in late December. In January, the series began airing on a four-episode block run from 8 a.m. to noon ET.
