= Jo Frost: Family Matters =

British tabloid talk show

- Genre: Tabloid talk show
- Presented by: Jo Frost
- Country of origin: United Kingdom
- Original language: English
- No. of series: 1
- No. of episodes: 35

Production
- Running time: 60 minutes (inc. adverts)
- Production company: ITV Studios

Original release
- Network: ITV
- Release: 28 April – 5 September 2014

Related
- The Jeremy Kyle Show

Jo Frost: Family Matters is a British tabloid talk show presented by Jo Frost. It was broadcast on ITV from 28 April to 5 September 2014.

== Format ==
Similarly to The Jeremy Kyle Show, Family Matters was studio based with each family invited into the studio to talk to Frost about their family issues.
