= Jo Frost =

English television personality (born 1970)

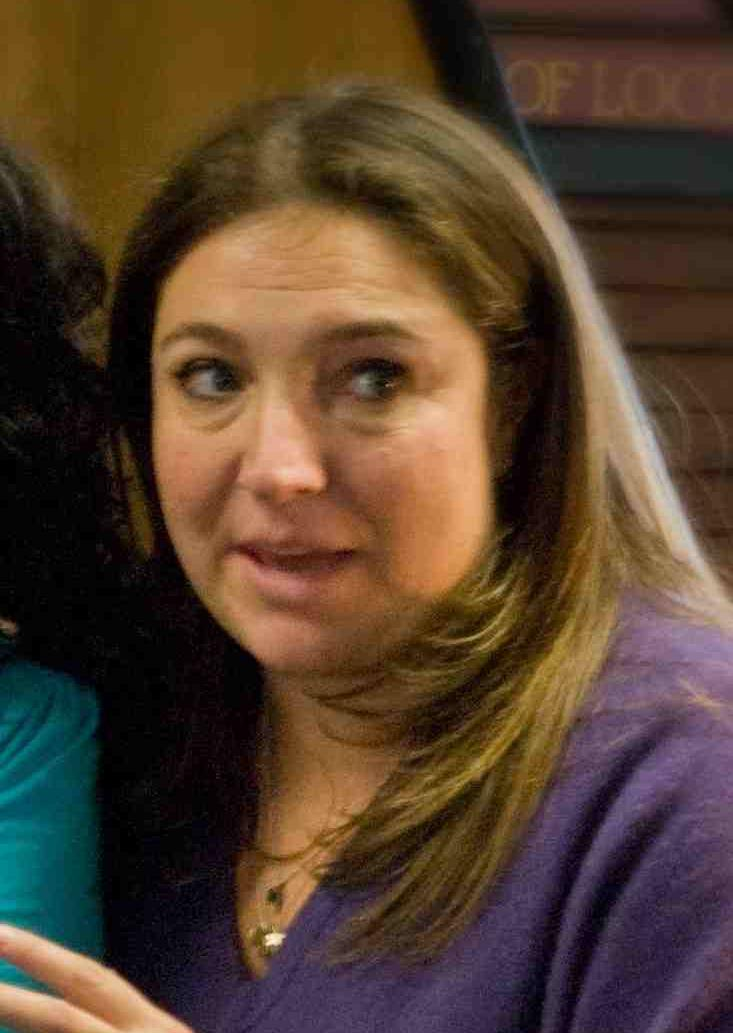
- Frost in 2009
- Born: Joanne Frost; 27 June 1970 (age 56); London, England
- Occupations: Nanny; television personality; author; television producer
- Years active: 1989–present (nanny); 2004–present (TV personality)
- Known for: Supernanny and related shows
- Spouse: Darrin Jackson (m. 2014)
- Website: www.jofrost.com

Joanne Frost (born 27 June 1970), known professionally as Jo Frost, is a British television personality, nanny, and author. She is best known for the reality television programme Supernanny UK, in which she was the central figure. The show first aired in the United Kingdom in 2004 and she has branched off into several other reality shows in the United Kingdom, United States and the Netherlands. Family S.O.S. with Jo Frost addressed issues such as addiction and abuse. Frost has written six books on child care.

== Early life ==
Joanne Frost was born on 27 June 1970 in London, England. She grew up with one brother in Southwest London. Her father was a British builder and painter, and her mother, born in Gibraltar, was an interior decorator. Frost's mother died of breast cancer when Frost was 24.

== Career ==
=== Nanny ===
Frost worked as a nanny beginning in 1989, when she was 18 years of age. She was employed in the United Kingdom and the United States and Frost's clients included celebrities such as John Lloyd, a television producer.

=== Television ===
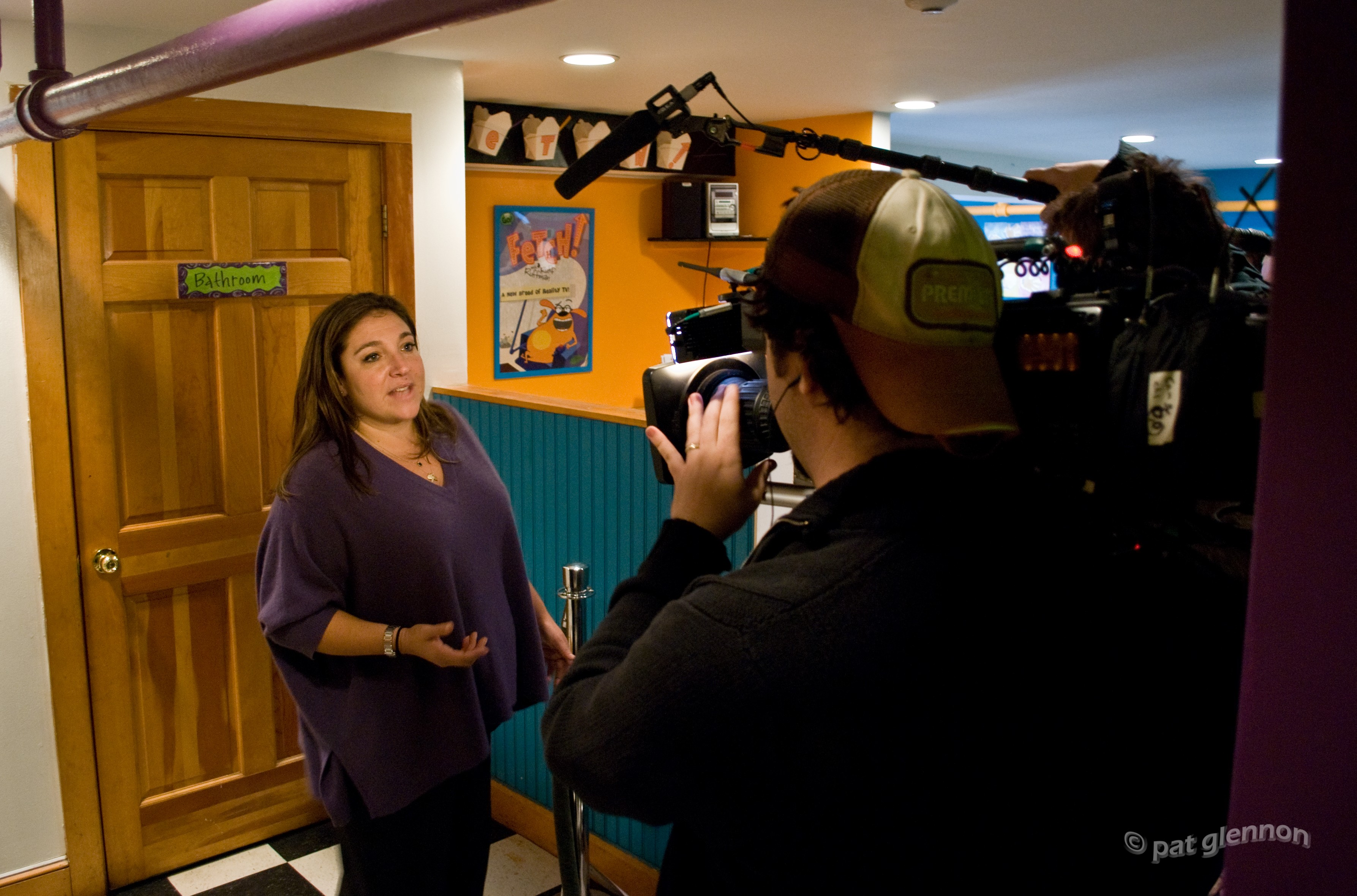
Frost filming at the Children's Museum in Easton, Massachusetts, U.S. in 2009

Frost was hired for the Channel 4 Supernanny television show that launched in the United Kingdom in 2004. In each episode, she visited a family and implemented consistent disciplinary, behavioural and entertainment techniques to improve troubled families' lives. In their book Handbook of Psychological Assessment, Case Conceptualisation and Treatment, Children and Adolescents, Michel Hersen and David Reitman state, "With considerable skill, Super Nanny Jo Frost implements standard, evidence-based contingency management procedures, as well as heavy evidence of creating alternative positive activity structures." The show has had its critics, and not all child-care experts agree with her approach. Some people find that the children's right to privacy has been violated and that children are embarrassed when put on the "naughty step". Newcastle University media and cultural-studies lecturer Tracey Jensen believes that the format results in the mother being "shamed before she is transformed". In a 2020 retrospective for Tribune magazine, author Jason Okundaye wrote: "Supernanny further enabled the public spectacle of ASBOs, which criminalised nuisance and implied that delinquent children presented an existential threat to national moral virtue[...] The reality show helped to calcify public attitudes towards 'unruly children' and their 'irresponsible parents' with local papers reporting the introduction of 'Supernanny plans' to expand the ASBO regime to compulsory parenting orders."

The show was viewed by six million people in its first year. Shows were created in 48 countries by 2014 that were tailored after Supernanny. The British show ran for six seasons. The American version aired on ABC. Like the British version, the American Supernanny was also a success and garnered Frost invitations to Late Show with David Letterman, The Oprah Winfrey Show, and The Tonight Show with Jay Leno.

Jo Frost: Extreme Parental Guidance aired in the UK for Channel 4 beginning in 2010. It had an issue-based format, with limited home visits. Family S.O.S. with Jo Frost premiered on 28 May 2013, on TLC in the United States with a 90-minute episode. Supernanny focused on discipline issues, but Family S.O.S. tackled serious, complex issues, such as blended families, addiction, abuse, and marital problems in family's homes. TV critic Hank Stuever commented, "For all its noise and uncomfy moments, Family S.O.S. is relatively genuine stuff, especially for the current incarnation of TLC. Viewers who know Frost's previous work will have no trouble believing that she cares about the outcome and sincerely wants to help these families patch things up." Frost was one of the executive producers for the show.

Beginning on 18 April 2014, she hosted the talk show Family Matters for ITV. Prior to the show, families underwent taped interviews about the nature of their difficulties, to be addressed during the programme. The show relied on Frost's intuition and experience to resolve difficult situations, sometimes dealing with parents more directly than she may have done in other shows. Over time, Frost has softened her image, including stopping her common gesture of pointing her finger at people, and stopped wearing severe suits, both of which had been iconic during her time on Supernanny. Twofour Broadcast planned in July 2014 for a new British show with Frost that would "help to restore harmony and balance to their family life" over the course of a family retreat.

A 20-episode revival season of the American Supernanny premiered on Lifetime on 1 January 2020, 8 years after the ABC version finished.

In 2020, Frost was announced as the star of Australian programme The Parent Jury. However, due to restrictions during the COVID-19 pandemic, she was unable to travel for filming and production proceeded without her.

== Activism ==
Frost is an advocate for the United Nations Foundation's Shot@Life movement, which aims to decrease vaccine-preventable childhood diseases and deaths. In March 2015, she visited legislators at Capitol Hill to show her support for the movement. Frost operates a blog to promote vaccination of children and is one of the celebrities that has shown her support for #Givingtuesday, the International Day of Giving.

== Personal life ==
Frost previously lived with her father when she was not taping or meeting other career obligations. By 2014, she had moved to Orange County, California with her husband Darrin Jackson, a location manager who had worked as a production manager on her show.

In 2023, she explained in an In Touch Weekly article that she and her husband were "never in a space" to decide to have children.

Frost is an active supporter for those who live with anaphylaxis and life-threatening allergies, and was the 2014 ambassador for FARE (Food, Allergy, Research and Education). She herself has environmental allergies and asthma, and was diagnosed with potentially deadly allergies to nuts, rye, and shellfish when she was a child.

== Works ==
=== Programmes ===
- Supernanny. United Kingdom. 2004–2008.
- Supernanny. United States. 2020 [First aired 2005–2011].
- Jo Frost: Extreme Parental Guidance. United Kingdom. 2010–2012.
- Family S.O.S. with Jo Frost. United States. 2013.
- Family Matters. United Kingdom. 2014.
- Jo Frost: Nanny on Tour. Netherlands. 2015.
- Jo Frost: Nanny On Tour. United States. 2016.
- Jo Frost On Britain's Killer Kids. United Kingdom. 2017.

=== Books ===
- Jo Frost (2005). Supernanny: How to Get the Best from Your Children. London: Hodder. ISBN 0-340-89516-0.
- Jo Frost (2006). Ask Supernanny: What Every Parent Wants to Know. London: Hodder Mobius. ISBN 0-340-92132-3.
- Jo Frost (2007). Jo Frost's Confident Baby Care. London: Orion. ISBN 978-0-7528-8855-2.
- Jo Frost (2011). Jo Frost's Confident Toddler Care. London: Orion. ISBN 978-1-4091-1334-8.
- Jo Frost (2013). Jo Frost's Toddler SOS. London: Orion. ISBN 978-0-7528-9864-3.
- Jo Frost (2014). Jo Frost's Toddler Rules. New York: Ballantine Books. ISBN 978-0-345-54238-0.

== See also ==
- Sharon Carr – Britain's youngest female murderer, whom Frost has presented documentaries on
