= Supernanny =

British television programme

- Genre: Reality
- Presented by: Jo Frost
- Narrated by: Nick Frost
- Theme music composer: Moonshine Music
- Country of origin: United Kingdom
- Original language: English
- No. of series: 5
- No. of episodes: 29 (list of episodes)

Production
- Camera setup: Single-camera
- Running time: 60 minutes (inc. adverts)
- Production company: Ricochet South

Original release
- Network: Channel 4
- Release: 7 July 2004 – 8 October 2008

Related
- Supernanny (American TV series); Jo Frost: Extreme Parental Guidance; Jo Frost: Family Matters; It's Me or the Dog

Supernanny is a British reality television programme about parents struggling with their children's behaviour, mealtime routines, potty training, etc. It features Jo Frost, a professional nanny who devotes each episode to helping a family where the parents are struggling with child-rearing. Through instruction and observation, she shows parents alternative ways to discipline their children and regain order in their households. Frost is a proponent of the "naughty chair" theory of discipline and is strictly opposed to spanking.

The programme aired on Channel 4 from 7 July 2004 to 8 October 2008. A follow-up programme, Jo Frost: Extreme Parental Guidance, ran from 9 February 2010 to 5 August 2012. Supernanny has been adapted in other countries, including an American version (also with Frost).

== History ==
Supernanny was originally broadcast in the UK on Channel 4 on 7 July 2004, following the success of Channel 4's Cutting Edge programme Bad Behaviour. Supernanny was one of Channel 4's most popular programmes, reaching nearly 5 million viewers in the first series, with consistently high ratings throughout the series.

The premiere episode for the third series attracted 3.1 million viewers with a 14% audience share. These values are half of those from the previous two series.

== Reception ==
In their book Handbook of Psychological Assessment, Case Conceptualization, and Treatment, Children and Adolescents, Michel Hersen and David Reitman state, "With considerable skill, Super Nanny Jo Frost implements standard, evidence-based contingency management procedures, as well as heavy evidence of creating alternative positive activity structures." The show has had its critics, and not all child-care experts agree with her approach. Some people find that the children's right to privacy has been violated and that children are embarrassed when put on the "naughty step". The Newcastle University media and cultural-studies lecturer Tracey Jensen believes that the format results in the mother being "shamed before she is transformed".

The programme, viewed by six million people in its first year, was an "instant success." Shows were created in 48 countries by 2014 that were tailored after Supernanny.

== Home media ==
A DVD release of Supernanny entitled When Little Kids Cause Big Headaches was released in the UK on 12 April 2010.

== Episodes ==
Supernanny series overview[8][9]
Series	Episodes	Originally released	
Series	Episodes	First released	Last released
1	3	7 July 2004	21 July 2004
2	12	5 April 2005	5 October 2005
3	6	29 August 2006	3 October 2006
4	5	29 August 2007	26 September 2007
5	3	24 September 2008	8 October 2008

== International versions ==
Supernanny has been broadcast or slightly adapted in other countries.

Country	Title	Network(s)	Simulcast networks
Australia	Supernanny	Nine Network (2004–2013); GEM (2011–2013)	Lifestyle Home (2011–2013)
Belgium	Supernanny	vtm	No other foreign networks applicable
Brazil	Supernanny	SBT	No other foreign networks applicable
Croatia	Superdadilja	RTL	No other foreign networks applicable
Czech Republic	Superchůva k pohledání Chůva v akci	Prima televize	No other foreign networks applicable
China	超级育儿师	Guizhou Satellite Channel (since 2018)	No other foreign networks applicable
Finland	Supernanny Suomi	MTV3	No other foreign networks applicable
Japan	スーパーナニー	TV Tokyo (since 1999)	No other foreign networks applicable
France	Super Nanny; Les Nannies	M6; TFX; TF1	No other foreign networks applicable
Germany	Die Super Nanny (2004–2011); Mission Familie (2014)	RTL Television; Sat.1	No other foreign networks applicable
Indonesia	Supernanny	MetroTV (Sunday noon)	No other foreign networks applicable
Israel	סופר נני	Channel 2	No other foreign networks applicable
Italy	Supernanny	NOVE, Discovery+, Real Time	No other foreign networks applicable
Lithuania	Super Auklė	TV1	No other foreign networks applicable
Malaysia	Supernanny	NTV7	No other foreign networks applicable
Netherlands	Eerste Hulp Bij Opvoeden	RTL 4	No other foreign networks applicable
Poland	Superniania	TVN	No other foreign networks applicable
Portugal	Supernanny	SIC (2018, cancelled after two episodes due to pressure from children's rights groups)	No other foreign networks applicable
Romania	Supernanny	Prima TV	No other foreign networks applicable
Russia	Суперняня	REN TV	No other foreign networks applicable
Singapore	Supernanny	MediaCorp Okto	No other foreign networks applicable
Slovakia	Pestúnka	TV Markíza	No other foreign networks applicable
Spain	Supernanny (2006); S.O.S. Adolescentes (2007)	Cuatro	(Catalonia) TV3 (Basque Country (autonomous community)) ETB 1
Sweden	Supernanny Sverige	TV3	No other foreign networks applicable
Turkey	Süperdadı	TRT1 (2012)	No other foreign networks applicable
United States	Supernanny	ABC (2005–2011); Lifetime (2020)	(United Kingdom) Channel 4, E4 (Indonesia) MetroTV (Sunday noon) (United States) ABC
