= Out of the Wild =

- Country of origin: United States
- No. of seasons: 3
- No. of episodes: 24

Production
- Running time: 46 Minutes
- Production companies: Ricochet (season 1); Pilgrim Films (season 2-3)

Original release
- Network: Discovery Channel
- Release: April 22, 2008 – April 7, 2011

Out of the Wild (known in the first season solely as The Alaska Experiment) is a Discovery Channel reality television series. The first and second seasons followed volunteers from urbanized backgrounds as they use survival skills in the back-country of Alaska during the fall and winter. The third season saw a relocation of the series to Venezuela, while keeping the same general format of season 2. The series was produced by Ricochet in the first season, and by Pilgrim Films in seasons 2 and 3.

== Season 1: "The Alaska Experiment" ==
In the first season of the series, 4 teams of 10 urban professionals are dropped off in the Alaskan back-country with directions to shelters they would spend the next few weeks in. The series follows these groups through the weeks as they struggle to live off the land at their shelters. Paul Claus starred as the wilderness survival expert and Neil Webster helped guide several of the participants on a moose hunt which included training in firing .338 Winchester Magnum and .22 rifles for mountain goat hunting (which Claus and his son separately took participants to do).

Locations include Camp Riou Point and Back Bay (both in Icy Bay), Flower Lake (in the Upper Chitina River Valley), and Hawkins Glacier.

Tributes: Bernice Pierson Greg Pierson

== Season 2: "Out of the Wild: The Alaska Experiment" ==
In the second season, the series was retooled and renamed, with nine volunteers working together as one team traveling across the wilderness rather than staying in one place. Due to the greater difficulty for survival of large and inexperienced groups backpacking so remotely, each participant had an emergency GPS unit that could summon a rescue team to evacuate them from the experiment. After the first few days, almost half the participants leave the show via these GPS units. 4 people finally finish the experiment after almost a month. They are rescued by a train.

The filming for this season began September 2008 and was aired on April 14, 2009.

=== Volunteers ===
- Penny Jo Johnson: Body Piercer and Landlord, Burnside, KY - First Evacuated. Evacuated because of hunger.
- Joe Harner: Fishing Outfitter, Ashland, WI - Second Evacuated. Evacuated because of how frustrated he was with everyone having no experience.
- Frederic Birt: Customer Service Rep, Chicago, IL - Third Evacuated. Evacuated because of tiredness and multiple accounts of passing out.
- Dan Rac: Police Officer, Brick, NJ - Fourth Evacuated. Evacuated because of not getting enough food and his body wearing down.
- Carolyn Yamazaki: Lawyer, Chicago, IL - Fifth Evacuated (Evacuated the day before other teammates reached civilization) Evacuated because of depression from not getting enough food and having low serotonin levels.
- Trish Bulinsky: School Bus Driver, Middletown, NJ - Survived the Wild
- Jake Nodar: Horse Trainer, Darnestown, MD - Survived the Wild
- John Ulmer: Assistant Director of Housing, Bronx, NY - Survived the Wild
- Kimberly Wise: Personal Trainer, Chula Vista, CA - Survived the Wild

=== Special Guests ===
- Billy Fitzgerald: Taught the crew how to correctly hunt bear. Came on days 17, 18, 20, 21, and 22.

== Season 3: “Out of the Wild: Venezuela” ==
The format was very similar to the second season with nine volunteers being dropped off on the remote Mount Roraima in the southern wilderness of Venezuela. The volunteers were given a map, compass and a variety of modern and native survival gear. They were tasked with finding civilization without any other outside assistance. Along the way they were directed to designated camps as indicated on the map. Some camps provided pre-built huts and at other locations the volunteers had to construct their own shelters. Just as in the second season, each volunteer could activate a GPS beacon to summon a rescue team via helicopter to remove them from the experience. The series followed the group through jungle, savannah, swamp, scrubland and finally a river portion for which the group had to build a raft. Four volunteers were evacuated and five reached civilization after twenty-six days.

Casting took place in July 2010, and the series was filmed in the fall of 2010. The third season premiered on the Discovery Channel on February 17, 2011

=== Volunteers ===
- Carolina Dellepiane: NYC, NY - 1st evacuated (Day 8)
- Tara Filer: Grants Pass, OR - 2nd evacuated (Day 12)
- Rob Lacombe: Rocklin, CA - 3rd evacuated (Day 14)
- Samuel Ebeyer: Jefferson, LA - 4th evacuated (Day 15)
- Nick Albini: Tarpon Springs, FL - Survived the Wild
- Ryan Van Duzer: Boulder, CO - Survived the Wild
- Brad Strand: Ironwood, MI - Survived the Wild
- Melissa Mahoney: San Diego, CA - Survived the Wild
- Michael Merchant: Hampden, ME - Survived the Wild
