= List of Supernanny (American TV series) episodes =

Supernanny is an American reality television program that aired on ABC from 2005 to 2011 and Lifetime in 2020. The ages of the children and the parents are the ages they were at the time the show was broadcast. This list does not include the episodes of its American spin-off, America's Supernanny.

== Series overview ==
Season	Episodes	Originally released		
Season	Episodes	First released	Last released	Network
1	12	January 17, 2005	May 11, 2005	ABC
2	19	September 23, 2005	September 18, 2006	ABC
3	15	December 4, 2006	August 6, 2007	ABC
4	20	January 2, 2008	June 25, 2008	ABC
5	22	October 3, 2008	May 1, 2009	ABC
6	14	October 23, 2009	March 12, 2010	ABC
7	15	November 5, 2010	March 18, 2011	ABC
8	18	January 1, 2020	September 22, 2020	Lifetime

== Episodes ==
=== Season 1 (2005) ===
No. overall	No. in season	Title	Location	Original release date	Prod. code	U.S. viewers (millions)
1	1	"Jeans Family"	Denver, Colorado	January 17, 2005	101	9.97
David and Barbara have three daughters: 4-year-old Andra and 3-year-old identical twins Leah and Jessie. Andra talks back and is aggressive. The twins can't help but they are learning from their older sister. Jessie has quickly picked up the aggressive behavior and back-talking, while Leah is a crier as she weeps over every little thing. The combination of all three girls makes a turbulent and chaotic existence.
2	2	"Bullard Family"	Aurora, Colorado	January 24, 2005	102	9.25
Bryce and Jen have two sons: 6-year-old Brycie and 2-year-old Rylan. While being parented, there is no quality time. Brycie talks back, has an attitude problem, refuses to share, and is disrespectful because he doesn't get his own way. Rylan doesn't act out as much as Brycie, but he does cry a lot and refuses to go to bed. Jen tries juggling with work and taking care of the boys.
3	3	"Orm Family"	Santa Clarita, California	January 31, 2005	103	10.75
Shawn and Tammy have three sons: 8-year-old Chandler, 6-year-old Caden, and 3-year-old Declan. The parents don't see eye to eye on parenting. Chandler talks back, has an attitude, and shows no respect for his parents. Caden is a picky eater and refuses to eat what the rest of the family eats at dinner. Declan is picking up his brothers' behavior and constantly wanders outside unsupervised. The boys fight with each other, and Caden frequently bullies Declan.
4	4	"Wischmeyer Family"	Bailey, Colorado	February 7, 2005	104	11.39
John and Melora have three children: 9-year-old Jared and 4-year-old identical twins Ashlyn and Alaia. The Wischmeyer twins have big personalities but they’re ruling the household with them torturing their parents and bullying their brother. They’re both very rowdy, defiant, sassy, they call their parents and their brother names, and both of them go as far as to hit them. The girls each take turns being the ringleader. During the day, Alaia has her turn being the ringleader of the duo. She is stubborn and headstrong. Though both of the girls misbehave during the day, their parents have more problems with Alaia than they do with Ashlyn. When Alaia and Melora argue, Alaia can get physical with her mom and would usually hit and kick her. At night, Ashlyn has her turn to lead. Alaia is calmer at night and Ashlyn is very emotional and defiant during bedtime. Ashlyn refuses to sleep unless it’s on her terms. She would end throwing a pretty big fit and demands that her mother lie down with her. In the middle of the night when she gets up to get something to drink, Alaia will follow suit. Jared feels left out and is often blamed for his sisters' misbehavior, even when they annoy him. The twins make it nearly impossible for their mother to concentrate on her work, especially with Alaia lashing out at Melora and taunting her.
5	5	"Weston Family"	Woodland Hills, California	February 14, 2005	105	9.35
Fred and Andrea have two sons: 4-year-old Andrew and 11-month-old Sean. Andrew is very aggressive. He talks back to his parents, throws tantrums, and bullies his baby brother, Sean, and other children in countless ways, which eventually led to him getting expelled from daycare. He is also so defiant; he refuses to eat his dinner if he isn't served his favorite foods and constantly gets out of bed during bedtime.
6	6	"Bailey Family"	Palmdale, California	February 21, 2005	106	9.71
Bill and Stacie have two children: 6-year-old Jadyn and 2-year-old Billy. Jadyn talks back and refuses to sleep in her bed. Billy throws ear-splitting tantrums to get his own way and timeouts don't work for him since he is known to escape.
7	7	"Gorbea Family"	Whittier, California	March 7, 2005	107	9.01
Robert and Evelina have three children: 9-year-old Demetrius, 8-year-old Meya, and 2-year-old Adam. While both of his older siblings, Demetrius and Meya are well-behaved, Adam constantly latches onto Evelina and explodes into ear-bursting tantrums when he does not get her attention and talks back a lot. He also refuses to go to sleep, which often keeps her up until the small hours. Nobody gets to watch their favorite TV shows when Adam wants to watch TV. Demetrius and Meya feel neglected and don't get enough attention because of their younger brother's tantrums. Robert is lazy and lets Evelina deal with the children and housework.
8	8	"Ririe Family"	Thousand Oaks, California	March 21, 2005	108	7.50
Scott and Jennifer have four children: 9-year-old Selia, 7-year-old Hallden, 3-year-old Blake, and 1-year-old Broden. Scott and Jennifer have completely different outlooks on how their children should be parented. The three older children are snacking at all times. By far, their most troublesome child, who is defiant and destructive, is Blake, their wild child. Every time Jennifer looks away, Blake makes a beeline for the front door and dashes out across the busy road to play with a friend. He also constantly talks back to his parents and is rude to them. While at the mall, Blake runs off in every direction. Selia and Hallden don't act out much outside of snacking, but Broden is picking up Blake's behavior.
9	9	"Collins Family (U.K. Family)"	Northampton (East), Northamptonshire	April 4, 2005	109	9.68
Jason and Karen Collins have four children: 10-year-old Ben, 9-year-old Lauren, 6-year-old Joshua, and 4-year-old Joseph. The children aren't just aggressive and destructive, but they also constantly talk back. Ben encourages his younger brothers to do naughty things. Lauren is well-behaved and doesn't act out as much as her brothers, but sometimes misbehaves, while Joshua is picking up fights with his siblings. Joseph is the hardest problem, as he is very aggressive, destructive, and pours out Karen's hair care products onto her bed. Note: This is the first episode of Supernanny USA to be filmed back-to-back in the UK, a separate version of the episode the same family aired the next day following from US version episode's airing.
10	10	"Burnett Family"	Mount Laurel, New Jersey	April 18, 2005	110	8.68
Michael and Joanne have five children: 8-year-old Zachary (from Michael's first marriage), 3-year-old identical twins Joseph and John, and 16-month-old fraternal twins Michael and Molly. Michael, who works from home, is struggling to work and take care of the two sets of twins at the same time. Michael and his ex-wife share joint custody of Zachary, so he is home on certain days.
11	11	"Christiansen Family"	East Windsor, New Jersey	May 2, 2005	111	8.82
Chris and Colleen have two sons: 7-year-old Corey and 3-year-old Chase. Corey is a very stubborn personality, while Chase rules the roost and is following his brother's footsteps. Both of the boys scream, hit, pinch, talk back, swear, leave the house without permission, display bad manners, and do not listen and do as they're told. Chase still drinks from a baby bottle. Mealtimes are a disaster since Corey and Chase eat their food away from the table. Bedtimes are also a disaster since the boys do not go to bed when they are told to do so and disrespect their parents at bedtime.
12	12	"Family Update Special"	Various Locations	May 11, 2005	112	5.93
Jo revisits most of the families that she has helped this season and gets a progress report from each of them.

=== Season 2 (2005–06) ===
No. overall	No. in season	Title	Location	Original release date	Prod. code	U.S. viewers (millions)
13	1	"Minyon Family"	Douglasville, Georgia	September 23, 2005	201	5.49
Frank Sr. and Danielle have two children: 7-year-old Frank Jr. and 4-year-old Skyler. Princess Skyler frequently fights with her mom by throwing emotional, but violent temper tantrums. She does it by hitting and kicking and screaming. Skyler would hit her mom or vice versa. Frank Jr. doesn't act out as much as his sister, but he whines and refuses to get out of bed in the morning until Danielle dresses him, possibly due to feeling neglected because of his parents being so busy dealing with Skyler's antics. Frank Sr. doesn't favor his son, but he praises Skyler, despite her misbehavior.
14	2	"Webb Family"	Fairburn, Georgia	September 23, 2005	202	6.62
Arthur and Cathy have three children: 6-year-old Josef, 5-year-old Paige, and 2-year-old Madison. Paige has Down syndrome and has trouble with her speech. Josef feels left out because his mother spends a lot more time with his sisters than him. He acts out by talking back and being independent. Madison is very demanding and sometimes clingy. Bedtimes are a disaster when Cathy puts the children to bed and they come out of their rooms. Arthur's job requires him to travel five days a week throughout almost the entire year, leaving Cathy to handle the children on her own. When Arthur is home on the weekends, he is lazy and doesn't bother disciplining the children.
15	3	"McMillion Family"	Arlington, Texas	September 30, 2005	203	6.10
Cheryl (without her husband, Jonathan, who is serving in Afghanistan for a year) has three sons: 9-year-old Ryan (almost 10), 7-year-old Hunter, and 3-year-old Garrett. The boys act out by fighting, talking back at their mother, yelling, and swearing. Cheryl's method of discipline is using her belt to spank the boys. Ryan talks back when he is told to wash his hands. Cheryl kicks Ryan and Hunter out to play after school in an attempt to avoid dealing with their misbehavior. Garrett is learning a lot by his brothers.
16	4	"Larmer Family"	Fort Worth, Texas	October 7, 2005	204	5.73
Ed and Judy have four children: 4-year-old John, 2-year-old fraternal twins Justin and Jessica, and an 11-month-old baby named Joey. The family moved from Florida to Texas so the children can be closer to Judy's family. The three older children are getting into things, destructive, disobedient, and constantly talk back to their parents. Judy doesn't let the children outside much because they like to play with Ed's cement mixer, and she worries they might get dirty. Judy's mother, Sharon, loves her grandchildren, but doesn't like it when they come over and mess with her belongings. Judy has also gotten carried away with childproofing the house.
17	5	"Cooke Family (U.K. Family)"	Bishop's Stortford, Hertfordshire	October 14, 2005	213	6.96
Paul and Denise Cooke have three daughters: 9-year-old Meghann, 6-year-old Gabriella, and 4-year-old Erin. With the eldest daughter, Meghann, as the ringleader, the girls talk back to their parents. Paul's relationship with Denise is strained, and so is the latter's relationship with Meghann. Because of the girls' behavior, the family hardly ever goes out in fear for an embarrassing scene.
18	6	"Amaral Family"	Boca Raton, Florida	October 21, 2005	214	5.74
Michael and Lorraine have three sons: 9-year-old Ryan, 4-year-old Logan, and 2-year-old Kade. Ryan and Logan fight each other like cats and dogs. Logan is very destructive and is physically aggressive toward anyone. Kade doesn't act out as much as his brothers, but he does wander off unattended. Michael and Lorraine own a restaurant and bring the boys with them to work, but Ryan and Logan constantly misbehave in the restaurant. Ryan also has a hard time with concentrating on his homework.
19	7	"Facente Family"	Marietta, Georgia	November 4, 2005	206	5.88
Trae and Deirdre have three children: 4-year-old identical twins Kayla and Marlana and 3-year-old Tristin. Tristin has autism and is unable to speak. Deirdre and Trae don't know how to integrate Tristin into their daily life. The parents are at a loss as to how to help Tristin come out of his zone and join the family. The twins demand their mother's attention by following her.
20	8	"Keilen Family"	New Market, Minnesota	November 11, 2005	207	7.34
Shaun and Tami have four children: 6-year-old Haeley, 4-year-old identical twins Maile and Malia, and 1-year-old Leighton. The twins (especially Maile) run roughshod over their parents and will talk back. Maile rules the household with her tantrums, and is constantly picking fights with her parents. Malia is much calmer than Maile, but she will be in her mom's lap for 24 hours and can misbehave in her perfect world. Haeley is bossy with her sisters, can get very aggressive towards them, and gets physical with them. Leighton will be in his high chair all by himself with no attention.
21	9	"Bradbury-Lambert Family (U.K. Family)"	Swindon (North), North East Wiltshire	November 18, 2005	215	6.59
Stuart Lambert and Laura Bradbury have three children: 5-year-old Matthew (from Laura's first marriage), 2 1/2-year-old Tegan-Olivia (from Stuart's first marriage), and 5-month-old Diesel. Matthew's aggressive and violent behavior often leaves Laura battered and bruised. Tegan-Olivia is picking up Matthew's behavior, while Laura doesn't allow Stuart to discipline Matthew.
22	10	"Tsironis Family"	Plymouth, Minnesota	November 25, 2005	208	6.00
Bob and Elizabeth have three children: 4-year-old Kate and 3-year-old identical twins Teddy and Nicholas. The twins were born prematurely, and because of this, Elizabeth is struggling to discipline them. Due to their lack of discipline, the twins are constantly aggressive, destructive, violent, talk back to their parents, and are quick to escape, leaving Bob and Elizabeth frazzled. Dinnertime is a disaster. The twins make a huge mess and throw their food all over the dining room. The other night, when the twins were bouncing on the bed, Nicholas pushed Teddy, and broke his leg. Kate is well-behaved, but she feels left out when her brothers misbehave and she often lies about having foot cramps to get her mother's attention.
23	11	"Carsley Family"	Enfield, New Hampshire	March 6, 2006	216	9.70
Cheryl has five children: 7-year-old Chantal, 5-year-old identical twins Caleb and Nicholas, and 4-year-old identical twins Bobby and Elijah. Cheryl is divorced and has full custody of the children. She is going to school to get her teaching certificate, but it's not easy for her as she deals with the children, who leave the house constantly messy and full of havoc. Chantal constantly hits and throws tantrums to get her mother's attention. The children control the divorce with anger, wall drawing, screaming, fighting, not taking Cheryl seriously, and disrespect.
24	12	"Schwartz Family"	Bellmore, New York	March 13, 2006	209	9.73
Steve and Cathy have four daughters: 6-year-old Samantha, 4-year-old Amanda, 3-year-old Katelyn, and 1-year-old Emily. NYPD officer Steve and medical biller Cathy work full time, leaving Cathy's sister, Donna, to babysit the girls. However, Donna does not discipline the girls well and believes that Cathy should not discipline them just because they are children. The three older girls constantly run in the house, scream, yell, and engaging in rough play. Samantha is energetic and often irritates her mom and aunt, while Amanda is stubborn and has occasional bouts of aggression. Katelyn acts like a diva and is demanding. She is also not potty trained and Cathy keeps her in diapers when she's home, but when Donna is around, Katelyn is puzzled—sometimes telling Donna to throw away the diapers and other times wanting to wear them.
25	13	"Silva Family"	Las Cruces, New Mexico	March 20, 2006	210	10.92
Tom and Danielle have seven children: 17-year-old Meghan and 7-year-old Allyson are from Tom’s first marriage, 8-year-old Cheryl and 6-year-old Mackenzie are from Danielle’s first marriage, and 2-year-old Riley, 1½-year-old Kassiah, and 6-month-old Caden are their children together. Tom is a soldier in the Army National Guard and is preparing to be deployed to Iraq for a year and a half, forcing Danielle to face the chaos of her three middle biological daughters Cheryl, Mackenzie, and Riley, as well as her younger stepdaughter, Allyson, since they constantly hit and cuss at each other. Meanwhile, Meghan has a strained relationship with her father, Tom, and Riley still uses a pacifier.
26	14	"Young Family"	Sarasota, Florida	March 27, 2006	217	10.02
Sherman and Joelle have three children: 13-year-old Dylan, 5-year-old Shermie, and 4-year-old Shelby. Shermie and Shelby rule the roost as they fight like cats and dogs. Shermie talks back, climbs walls, ignores Joelle's attempts to dish out discipline, and is very aggressive towards his mother and siblings. Shelby is very defiant, dramatic, and cries a lot. She is starting to follow Shermie's footsteps: back talking, aggressive behavior, and wall climbing. She also prefers to eat her dinner in front of the TV instead of with the rest of the family. Dylan gets annoyed with his younger siblings when they come into his room and usually wants to spend time alone or with his parents.
27	15	"Harmony Family"	Hutchinson, Kansas	April 3, 2006	211	9.46
Jacob and Erin have three sons: 11-year-old Jake, 5-year-old Ian, and 3-year-old Grant. Ian and Grant constantly attack and fight each other like cats and dogs. Ian talks back, swears, disrespects his parents, and bullies Grant. Grant bites the couch, very clingy, and evicts his father from the bed after sleeping four hours in his own bed. Grant also has a croaky voice because of his screaming. Jake is well-behaved, but it's easy for his brothers to annoy him. Jacob and Erin take the boys out to eat at least three times a week, and they, along with Jake, are prepared for embarrassment at all times. In the restaurant, Ian and Grant continue to fight, and Grant alone draws attention to himself by climbing around, refusing to stay in place, and screaming when he doesn't get his way.
28	16	"Wujcik Family"	Highland Park, Illinois	April 17, 2006	212	8.99
Tim and Toni have three children: 6-year-old Alec, 4-year-old Bryce, and 1-year-old Carly. The boys constantly screaming, run around the house, throw toys down from the window and balcony, talk back to their parents, ignore attempts to dish out discipline, and fight like cats and dogs. At dinnertime, the boys are picky eaters, and Toni makes a different meal for each of them. Tim doesn't bother disciplining the boys.
29	17	"Jackson Family"	O'Fallon, Missouri	April 24, 2006	218	8.57
Terry and Lisa have 5-year-old fraternal triplets; Ethan, Will, and Isabella. Terry is an out-of-town worker for almost the entire week and he is only home on Sundays, leaving Lisa to watch the triplets. However, it is a stressing nightmare for Lisa as the triplets constantly handle it with aggression, back-talking, and temper tantrums. Isabella can sometimes be aggressive towards her brothers, while Ethan kicks and hits his mother when he doesn't get his way. Will gets clingy when his father comes home. There are some weekends when Terry doesn't come home at all.
30	18	"Newton Family"	San Jose, California	May 1, 2006	219	10.31
Aaron Sr. and Vicki have two sons: 12-year-old Aaron Jr. and 5-year-old Kobe. Aaron Sr. and Vicki are divorced and share joint custody of the boys. Kobe is disrespectful and is physically and verbally abusive towards Vicki. Aaron Jr. doesn't act out as much as Kobe, but sometimes talks back. Vicki is unsuccessful at disciplining Kobe, while Aaron Sr. is strict with both boys.
31	19	"Uva Family"	Dunedin, Florida	September 18, 2006	220	6.10
Jeff and Rosemarie have two sons: 7-year-old Trevor and 4-year-old Travis. Rosemarie owns a preschool and Jeff frequently takes the boys there, but they do not set good examples for the other children by exhibiting aggression. The boys constantly terrorize the other children at Rosemarie's preschool and show no respect for their parents or their toys.

=== Season 3 (2006–07) ===
No. overall	No. in season	Title	Location	Original release date	Prod. code	U.S. viewers (millions)
32	1	"Bowersock Family"	Columbus, Ohio	December 4, 2006	301	9.63
Thad and Jenniffer have three children: 7-year-old Madeline, 6-year-old Hayden, and 4-year-old Lily. Madeline is 7 going on 20 and would drive her mother crazy. Hayden is aggressive towards his mother and sisters. Lily is picking up her older siblings' behavior. Jenniffer spanks her children and threatens them to eat soap as punishment while Thad yells at them. Even her own discipline system isn't enough as the children become too much for her.
33	2	"Weinstein Family"	Cleveland, Ohio	December 11, 2006	302	7.71
David and Chia have four children: 7-year-old McKenna "Kenny", 6-year-old Christina "Tina", 5-year-old Julia, and 2-year-old Robert. Kenny is highly sensitive and emotional, while Julia is a tattletale that can push other's buttons. Robert and Julia both throw things. Lastly, Tina is the aggressor of the family, who is a hot-head that can give attitude. Bedtime is a disaster. The children refuse to stay in their beds, especially Tina, and it usually takes them hours to fall asleep. David disciplines the children by yelling at them, but it leaves them in tears.
34	3	"Fager Family"	Dunkerton, Iowa/Marco Island, Florida	December 18, 2006	222	6.50
Joe and Stacie have six children: 10-year-old Sarah, 8-year-olds Andrew and Chelsea, 4-year-old identical twins Benjamin and Zachary, and 2-year-old Jacob. Sarah and Andrew are from Joe's first marriage. Chelsea is from Stacie's first marriage. With Joe working as a truck driver and going to school full-time, Stacie is stuck with taking care of the children. Ben, Zach, and Jacob are aggressive, run around, do dangerous things, and struggle with listening. Sarah and Andrew have not seen or spoken to their biological mother in a year and feel like they don't belong in the family. The family is constantly at home and afraid to go on vacation with all six children.
35	4	"Swanson Family"	Ellensburg, Washington	January 8, 2007	304	8.17
Ken and Vania have five sons: 9-year-old Alexander, 8-year-old Dawson, 5-year-old Myca, 4-year-old Brenden, and 3-year-old Christian. Alexander, Dawson and Myca are Vania's from previous relationships while Brenden and Christian are Ken and Vania's together. Ken and Vania own a taxi service. However, since they are constantly working, they have little time with the boys. As a result, the boys are neglected and are constantly fighting and wrecking the house. Ken and Vania's disagreements on how to discipline the boys are leading to a possible divorce.
36	5	"Mihalik Family"	Hanover, Pennsylvania	January 15, 2007	303	8.99
Donna has four children: 11-year-old Blake, 8-year-old Cole, 3-year-old Aiden, and 1-year-old Stephanie. Four years earlier, Cole was diagnosed with leukemia and had been treated for two years. Shortly after Cole was relieved of treatment and a few months before Stephanie was born, Donna's husband, Steve, died of an unexpected terminal illness. Since then, things at the Mihalik household have been in chaos. Now both of the older boys curse at their mother, flip her off, swear and fight constantly and have a complete lack of respect for her and each other because ever since the dad died there is no male figure to discipline them. Cole is angry, foul-mouthed, and nasty towards Donna. Blake is very aggressive and runs off to hang out with teenagers. Meanwhile, Aiden and Stephanie are starting to copy bad behavior from their older brothers.
37	6	"Smith Family"	Honolulu, Hawaii	January 22, 2007	310	9.17
Will and Michelle have two sons: 3-year-old Nathan "Nate" and 2-year-old Ari. Will and Michelle are college professors who have their hands full with two boys who constantly give them a hard time. Nate is 3 years old, but he isn't potty trained and ignores any attempts to dish out discipline. Ari constantly screams a lot and refuses to give up his baby bottle. The boys don't have bedrooms, so they sleep in the living room. Will and Michelle childproof the kitchen by securing everything with bungee cords.
38	7	"Haines Family"	Abrams, Wisconsin	January 29, 2007	308	8.72
Shane and Suzanne have two sons: 10-year-old Seth and 4-year-old Sean. Sean may be quiet, shy and a good boy at school, but he is the dictator at home. He throws temper tantrums, swears and lashes out at his parents and his brother. Seth doesn't act out as much as his brother, but he does seek attention by talking back and antagonizing his parents. Police officer Shane works the night shift and needs to sleep during the day, leaving Suzanne to handle the boys on her own.
39	8	"Nitti Family"	West Melbourne, Florida	February 5, 2007	305	9.57
Lisa has four sons: 10-year-old Darren, 8-year-old Matthew, 6-year-old Devin, and 5-year-old Jared. Darren is the ringleader of the mischief and bully of the house. Matthew is sensitive but can be a drama king, while Jared is a mama's boy, but he is picking up his brothers' habits and is prone to being babied. However, Devin is Lisa's biggest challenge, as he is not only the most aggressive of the boys, but his behavior has practically made the household fall under his reign, as his aggression will dictate what the family will do. All four of the boys swear, fight, and ignore their mother's attempts to discipline them. Lisa's boyfriend, John, lives with them and disciplines the boys by intimidating them with his temper.
40	9	"Bruno Family"	Trinity, Florida	February 12, 2007	306	9.83
John and Denise have four daughters: 15-year-old Mariah, 13-year-old Taylor, 6-year-old Isabella, and 4-year-old Samantha. Mariah has cerebral palsy and gets daily occupational therapy from Denise, but wishes to spend more time with John; however, he doesn't give her much attention. Taylor has a strained relationship with her father, John, because he does not like her goth-like appearance and ridicules her for her style. Isabella is the ringleader as she is aggressive and fights with her mother, while Samantha whines constantly. Isabella and Samantha constantly demand their mother's attention during Mariah's therapy. Mariah gets annoyed with her parents arguing with her sisters.
41	10	"McAfee Family"	Eagle River, Alaska	February 19, 2007	307	8.94
Brian has four children: 9-year-old Eliana, 7-year-old Silas, 5-year-old Kaia, and 3-year-old Anna. Brian is divorced and has full custody of the children. The younger children talk back to Brian, don't take him seriously, and show no respect for him. As the ringleader, Silas is aggressive towards Brian, bullies his sisters, and refuses to do his homework. In school, he fights his teachers, terrorizes the other students, and is on the verge of getting expelled from school. When Silas hurts Kaia and Anna, Eliana stands up for her sisters and herself by fighting back. Eliana doesn't act out like her younger siblings, but she has mood swings and sometimes gets into fights with Brian. Kaia tends to throw tantrums and Brian struggles to discipline her. Anna gets away with everything and is the baby of the family, and has picked up Kaia's tantrums and is becoming defiant.
42	11	"Goins Family"	Salt Lake City, Utah	February 26, 2007	311	10.14
Jay and Karolee have three children: 6-year-old Khalin, 5-year-old Kolben, and 2-year-old Kadance. Khalin was diagnosed with ADHD. He is the hardest problem as he throws tantrums, is aggressive towards his parents and younger siblings, misbehaves in school, and has trouble with his homework. Kolben acts aggressive and being attention-seeking, and Kadance is picking up her brothers' bad behavior. The children are constantly snacking without permission. Jay is lazy and refuses to help Karolee with disciplining the children. Karolee is pregnant and unsure if she is ready to have a fourth child to take care of.
43	12	"Williams Family"	Van Buren, Arkansas	March 5, 2007	309	9.58
Jency has three children: 12-year-old Bradley, 10-year-old Kelsee, and 5-year-old Hagan. Jency has two jobs and relies on her grandparents, Hal and Carolyn Smith, to look after the children while she is working. Hagan has anger issues and is aggressive towards his mother and siblings. Bradley and Kelsee are not as bad as their brother, but Bradley sometimes picks fights with his younger siblings, and Kelsee talks back to her mother and acts like a teenager. However, all three children are well-behaved when they are at their great-grandparents' house.
44	13	"Walker Family"	Plainfield, Illinois	March 12, 2007	312	7.55
Anthony Sr. and Alice have three children: 12-year-old Anthony Jr., 6-year-old Naleila "Leila", and 14-month-old Alyssa. Alice's 17-year-old nephew, Marcus, also lives with the family. Alice runs a home daycare center and Marcus helps her look after the children, including his cousins. Anthony Jr. talks back and has no respect to his parents and bullies Leila. Leila refuses to sleep in her own bed. Alice is still nursing Alyssa.
45	14	"Cantoni Family"	Naugatuck, Connecticut	May 28, 2007	205	5.29
Paul and Nina have three children: 6-year-old Nicolas, 3-year-old Gabrielle, and 1-year-old Giana. Nicolas is disrespectful, talks back, and doesn't get to spend time with his parents. Gabrielle is the ringleader as acts very bossy, throws tantrums, and refuses to go to bed. Gabrielle also has a croaky voice because of her screaming. Paul and Nina don't see eye-to-eye on disciplining the children. Two years earlier, Nina injured her shoulder in a car accident, making it harder for her to handle the children.
46	15	"Amouri Family"	Wixom, Michigan	August 6, 2007	313	5.13
Michael and Tamara have four children: 4-year-old Hailey, 2-year-old identical twins Jianni and Julian, and 1-year-old Ashton. While Michael goes out to work, stay-at-home Tamara has to handle the four children. Hailey is bossy and stubborn with her parents and listens to music that is not appropriate for children. The twins climb all over everything like a pair of chimpanzees, wander outside unsupervised and go to their neighbor's house. Ashton doesn't act out as much as his older siblings, but he does gets shocked from playing with a wall socket as the house isn't childproofed. Tamara is also more concerned with cleaning the house than handling the children.

=== Season 4 (2008) ===
No. overall	No. in season	Title	Location	Original release date	Prod. code	U.S. viewers (millions)
47	1	"Drake Family"	Swainsboro, Georgia	January 2, 2008	407	8.89
Billy-Joe and Donna have three children: 4-year-old Josie and 3-year-old identical twins Jared and Justin. Billy-Joe and Donna have reached the edge when they have to deal with the children. The kids do not listen, constantly run off, climb, fight, and refuse to brush their teeth. Donna's mother, Mimi, lives next door to the family, and the parents rely on her to look after the children while they are at work, but the children also give their grandmother a hard time. Billy-Joe and Donna recently purchased a new camper, but are unsure if they will be able to keep the children under control if they go on vacation.
48	2	"Chapman Family"	Elm Grove, Wisconsin	January 2, 2008	401	9.13
Glenn and Sara have five children: 17-year-old Brittany, 14-year-old Moriah, 4-year-old identical twins Ethan and Cole, and 3-year-old Quinn. For the first time, it's the teenage kids calling for Jo's help instead of the parents. Brittany and Moriah are living a real life Cinderella story; while their parents work full time, they are left alone to do chores and babysit their brothers while going to school online. Doing all these things with no help at all from their parents leave the girls exhausted and stressed. The boys constantly interrupt their sisters during their classes, and the girls are on the verge of failing out of school. Glenn has a strained relationship with his daughters and has had similar relationship issues with his own parents.
49	3	"Schumacher Family"	Las Vegas, Nevada	January 9, 2008	402	8.92
Brian and Teri have three children: 14-year-old Jessica, 11-year-old Alexi, and 7-year-old Dylan. The girls are emotional towards their parents. Jessica is lazy and constantly complains about being bored. Alexi chats with teenage boys she has never met in person on the phone and on the computer. Dylan is aggressive with his mother and sisters, swears, and talks back.
50	4	"Duan-Ahn Family"	San Francisco, California	January 16, 2008	403	6.04
Forrest and Angela have five children: 9-year-old Christopher, 8-year-old Isabella, 6-year-old identical twins Lawrence and Benjamin, and 5-year-old Charlotte. Forrest and Angela are dentists. With them exposing their children to various lessons and activities, every day is very busy for the entire family. Due to their overloaded schedule, Angela is constantly driving the children from place to place and they never have time to eat dinner at home. Sometimes the children go to bed super late because of their homework. Angela and the children are so stressed with their schedule that leads to the children acting out by being aggressive, fighting and picking on each other, and talking back and Angela having no energy to discipline them. The children never get to spend any time with Forrest due to him constantly working and almost never being at home. Forrest and Angela had purchased a newly built house three years earlier, but are afraid that the children might ruin it if they move in.
51	5	"Terrill Family"	Georgetown, Kentucky	January 23, 2008	408	7.18
Scott has two sons: 11-year-old Lane and 5-year-old Tate. Scott is divorced and has full custody of the boys. He has no clue of what to do as the boys are nothing but double trouble. Tate screams, throws tantrums, and is aggressive with his father and brother. Lane has developed a cholesterol problem since his father feeds him and Tate nothing but junk food.
52	6	"Dostal Family"	Wesley Chapel, Florida	February 6, 2008	405	7.56
Bill and Brenda have two children: 5-year-old Zachary and 3-year-old Erin. Zachary talks back and is violent and aggressive toward his parents and sister. Erin is well-behaved, but she vies for attention due to her brother's behavior. Zachary constantly attacks, scratches, kicks, punches and bullies his parents and sister. Bill and Brenda are constantly arguing over how to deal with Zachary, and Brenda fears it could lead to a divorce.
53	7	"Daniels Family"	Murrieta, California	February 13, 2008	409	8.80
Steve and Lisa have six children: 13-year-old Josh, 12-year-old Halley, 8-year-old Alexus, 7-year-old Alisen, 4-year-old Irelyn, and 2½-year-old Brynleigh. The girls act out by fighting, roughhousing, having outburst, swearing, and talking back to their parents. Halley has an attitude and talks back. Alexus is very hyperactive and swears to other people. Alisen, Irelyn, and Brynleigh join in. Josh avoids getting involved in his sisters' roughhousing by hiding out in his room or going to his friend's house and play video games. Dinnertime is a disaster. The girls refuse to sit down and get into food fights. Steve and Lisa have given up trying to discipline the girls.
54	8	"Wilson-Knutson Family"	Studio City, California	February 20, 2008	404	5.88
Dan and Wendy have four sons: 4-year-old Leo, 3-year-old Beau, and 6-week-old identical baby twins Will and Jesse. Wendy is a singer for Wilson Phillips and is the daughter of The Beach Boys co-founder Brian Wilson. However, her lifestyle isn't all fame and fortune as she has to deal with the antics of Leo and Beau. The boys constantly run around the house, throw tantrums, hit each other, and climb into bed with their parents. Beau is struggling with potty training and refusing to give up his pacifier. The arrival of the twins has made Wendy and Dan even more exhausted. Wendy and her sister, Carnie, are preparing for a cross-country tour for a few months, but Wendy is concerned because she has never left Dan to look after the boys alone for that amount of time.
55	9	"Tafoya Family"	Maricopa, Arizona	February 27, 2008	410	8.30
Jimmy and Holly have three sons: 7-year-old James, 5-year-old Tyler, and 2-year-old Ryan. Being at home with the boys is stressful for Holly. James is aggressive with his brothers, lies to his parents, talks back, and uses nasty words. Tyler and Ryan are picking up James' behavior. The boys play violent video games at their friend, Colton's, house and reenact the violence in the games. Holly feels that Jimmy is too harsh on the boys when he disciplines them. Jimmy is especially hard on little Ryan. He yells at him, cusses him out, and physically abuses him (i. e. Hitting, grabbing, throwing objects at him). When the boys use nasty words, Holly makes them eat soap as punishment.
56	10	"Prescott Family"	Hesperia, California	March 5, 2008	406	7.08
Daniel Sr. and Kadi have seven children: 8-year-old Marlie, 7-year-old Daniel Jr., 6-year-old Trenton, 5-year-old Phillip, 3-year-old Aiden, 2-year-old Ella, and 1-year-old Reed. Daniel Jr. has ADHD and is aggressive with his mother and siblings. Daniel and Kadi task Marlie with the most responsibilities out of all seven children. Trenton, Phillip, Aiden, Ella, and Reed have picked up Daniel Jr.'s behavior and are constantly fighting and hitting each other. Kadi's father, Sherman, left her when she was 13 after revealing that he was gay, and Daniel Sr. isn't comfortable with the family forming a close relationship with Sherman.
57	11	"Banjany Family"	Staten Island, New York	March 12, 2008	411	5.94
Rich and Lisa have three children: 5-year-old fraternal twins Cameron and Zoe and 3-year-old Blake. The boys fight like cats and dogs. Blake is aggressive, throws tantrums, and dresses like a girl with Zoe's clothes, and plays with her toys, which disturbs Rich. Zoe isn't as bad as her brothers, but she is the hardest challenge when she doesn't get her way. The children are constantly getting snacks from the pantry and the refrigerator. Rich and Lisa are trying to juggle operating their home-based cookie business and taking care of the children.
58	12	"McKeever Family"	Studio City, California	March 19, 2008	412	6.96
Corey and Lucy have two sons: 7-year-old Hunter and 6-year-old River. River is extreme aggressive. He hits, kicks, throws things, and explodes into ear-bursting tantrums. Hunter is disrespectful, foul-mouthed, talks back and throws tantrums. The combination of both boys turns into chaos. Corey is a little strict and hardly disciplines the boys, and when he does, he yells at them and holds the door to keep them in. Hunter and River are also sexist and have a hard time with concentrating on their homework.
59	13	"Addis Family"	Noblesville, Indiana	April 2, 2008	414	5.89
Tony and Leslie have four children: 6-year-old identical twins Jonathon and Jonah, 4-year-old Eden, and 2-year-old Elijah. All four of the children throw tantrums. The twins fight with each other and act aggressive towards their mother by hitting and kicking her. Eden is the princess of the family, but if she can't get her way, she will be defiant and refuse to cooperate. Elijah has picked up his older siblings' behavior and cries a lot. Leslie's mother, Charity, also lives with them. The family is grieving over the loss of Leslie's father, Rick, who died in a boating accident six months earlier. Rick's death has impacted the children's behavior.
60	14	"Citarella Family"	Scotch Plains, New Jersey	April 9, 2008	413	5.77
Joe and Debbie have four children: 7-year-old Rebecca, 6-year-old Sarah, 3-year-old Hannah, and 1-year-old Joshua. Police officer Joe has trouble enforcing the law with his children. The children run a 3-ring circus, as Debbie calls it. Sarah is set in her ways and if she doesn't want to do something, she will not get it done. Hannah is sneaky and has developed a habit of shoplifting. Joshua is described as a brute by his parents and gets into things. Rebecca doesn't act out as much as her younger siblings, but she is wild and bounces off the walls.
61	15	"Schrage Family"	Murfreesboro, Tennessee	April 23, 2008	415	5.45
Kyle and Christy have three daughters: 10-year-old Ellie, 6-year-old Emma, and 4-year-old Cara. The girls draw on walls, are disobedient, and showing no respect for their parents. Cara refuses to give up her pacifier. The girls prefer to sleep with their mother instead of their own beds. Their parents haven't slept together in a year. Christy's mother, Memaw, lives with the family, and her granddaughters show no respect for her privacy.
62	16	"Clause Family"	Studio City, California	April 30, 2008	416	5.50
Ken and Lorie have two children: 11-year-old Brandon and 8-year-old Caila. The children constantly fight with each other and their parents like toddlers and can't concentrate on their homework. As the ringleader, Caila is emotional to the point of throwing fits like a 4-year-old preschooler. Brandon isn't as bad as Caila, but he is very stubborn and is prone to lashing out violently. Ken is too focused on his work and does nothing to help Lorie handle the children, while Lorie fears she will never have a close relationship with the children.
63	17	"Martinez Family"	Clinton, Michigan	May 7, 2008	417	5.24
Sindo and Michelle have three children: 9-year-old Sindo, 7-year-old Ashley, and 6-year-old Mikey. With Sindo serving in Iraq for five months, Michelle finds it impossible to take care of her three misbehaving children alone and she overreacts to their behavior. Sindo talks back to his mother and hits her. Ashley throws in home and in public tantrums. Mikey is picking up his older siblings' behavior.
64	18	"Browning Family"	San Dimas, California	May 14, 2008	418	5.89
Charles and Bernadette have six children: 20-year-old Catalina (who is away at college), 17-year-old Erek, 14-year-old Devante, 10-year-old Brett, 8-year-old Joseph, and 2-year-old Charlette. Catalina, Erek and Devante are from Bernadette's first marriage. Bernadette tries juggling with work and looking after five of the children. All four of the boys spend most of their day playing video games, have no responsibility around the house or act out. Meanwhile, Charlette wanders around the house and seeks attention. Erek and Devante are convinced that Charles is freeloading since their mother makes more money than their stepfather does. Charlette seeks her mother's attention by following her around.
65	19	"Doyle Family"	Erlanger, Kentucky	May 28, 2008	221	N/A
Doug and Brandy have three children: 5-year-old Sara, 3-year-old Lizzy, and 20-month-old Andrew. The girls scream and are violent towards their parents and their brother. Lizzy is the ringleader as she is aggressive, throws tantrums, and is on the verge of getting expelled from daycare. Sara is stubborn and refuses to quit fighting until she wins. Andrew cries a lot and is on Brandy's lap 24 hours a day, and he is following his sisters' footsteps. When Doug comes home from work, he usually leaves Brandy to discipline the children on her own.
66	20	"Moy Family"	Lincoln, Nebraska	June 25, 2008	419	4.10
Harding and Michelle have three children: 11-year-old Hailey, 8-year-old Camryn, and 4-year-old Matthew. With Harding gone at work from Monday to Thursday, Michelle is stuck with her three stubborn children. Hailey has become defiant and sassy. Her behavior is caused by her father's long absences, and her mother giving her younger siblings more positive attention, which makes Hailey very jealous. Camryn is also defiant, talks back to her parents, and gives them attitude. The girls have a sibling rivalry for attention and constantly fight each other. Matthew is throwing tantrums to get his way.

=== Season 5 (2008–09) ===
No. overall	No. in season	Title	Location	Original release date	Prod. code	U.S. viewers (millions)
67	1	"Quinn Family"	Amherst, New Hampshire	October 3, 2008	501	N/A
David and Gina have four children: 16-year-old Cally, 14-year-old Casey, 10-year-old Corey, and 9-year-old Carli. Casey, who is a member of his middle school wrestling team, is both physically and verbally aggressive with his family and constantly bullies his siblings. All four children pick fights with each other, curse, lie to their parents, and refuse to do their chores. With Gina stressed out at home, she works at the gym more often. Sometimes David can't help but act like the children instead of disciplining them.
68	2	"Baulisch Family"	Papillion, Nebraska	October 10, 2008	502	N/A
Kip and Dorothy have four daughters: 18-year-old Melissa (from Dorothy's first marriage), 8-year-old Jessica, 7-year-old Jennifer, and 5-year-old Kristin. Both parents are deaf, while all four girls are hearing. The younger girls constantly fight with each other, talk back, take advantage of their parents' disability, and drive their parents crazy at bedtime. None of the girls except Melissa are good at sign language, and Melissa acts as a third parent to her sisters. Melissa also has a strained relationship with her stepfather Kip.
69	3	"Park Family"	West Hills, California	October 17, 2008	503	N/A
Michael and Heather have three children: 6-year-old Kyle, 4-year-old Farley, and 2-year-old Pierce. Kyle was diagnosed with ADHD. He acts aggressive and will hit and struggles to concentrate on his homework. His parents took him off of medication and do nothing constructive that helps their son. Farley and Pierce are picking up their older brother's behavior. In addition, the family's nanny, Alejandra, does not have discipline and control over the children.
70	4	"Winter Family"	Marietta, Georgia	October 24, 2008	504	N/A
Tom and Cathy have five children: 16-year-old Kristin (from Cathy's first marriage), 6-year-old identical twins Kayla and Erica, 3-year-old Tori, and 2-year-old Tommy. The twins constantly fight each other for their mother's attention. Tori throw tantrums when she doesn't get their way. Tommy bites his parents and sisters to get his way. Bedtime is a disaster as Tori and Tommy prefer to sleep with their mother instead of in their own beds, and they also horse around for up to an hour and a half before they fall asleep. Meanwhile, Kristin has a strained relationship with her stepfather, Tom, because he believes that she is doing irresponsible things while hanging out with her friends. Two years earlier, Cathy was diagnosed with kidney cancer and her recent recovery has made it harder for her to handle her children.
71	5	"Newsome Family"	Tallahassee, Florida	October 31, 2008	505	N/A
Blythe has six children: 13-year-old Loughlin, 12-year-old Aidan, 9-year-old Daly, 8-year-old Moira, 5-year-old Elspeth, and 3-year-old Finn. In the past year and a half, Blythe has faced several misfortunes. Due to financial problems, the family's house was foreclosed on, and Blythe divorced her husband, Roger, taking full custody of the children and moving into a much smaller house with tight living spaces. Several months after the foreclosure and the divorce, the family's nanny and closest friend, Nana, died of breast cancer. Since these tragic events, the children have become disrespectful, bossy, and will fight, and talk back, while Blythe is struggling to cope with her divorce and loss.
72	6	"Manley Family"	Encino, California	November 7, 2008	506	N/A
John and Sara have two children: 7-year-old Max and 4-year-old Claire. John and Sara have been separated for six months, and the children are worried that their parents will get divorced. Because of this and dad coming and going, Max is becoming disrespectful and has anger issues, and will throw tantrums, hit, and talk back. Meanwhile, Claire rules the roost and behaves far worse than Max. She is aggressive, but her biggest issue is that if she can't get her way, she will throw the biggest tantrums ever and will go on and on until she gets what she wants. Supermarket trips are a disaster, as the children run off into different aisles, and throw epic fits if they can't get what they want.
73	7	"Howat Family (U.K. Family)"	Shenley, Nr.Radlett, Hertfordshire	November 14, 2008	508	4.50
Tara Howat has three children: 8-year-old Casey, 7-year-old Shannon, and 4-year-old Rhys. As the ringleader, Rhys swears, disrespects his mother, throws tantrums, and never does as he is told. Shannon has picked up Rhys' behavior and deliberately disobeys and talks back to her mother. She also throws tantrums to get her own way. Good girl Casey has given up on time with her mother, while Tara is driven crazy by the two youngest and just yells at Shannon and Rhys.
74	8	"Lewis Family"	Claremont, California	November 21, 2008	509	N/A
Antoinette has two children: 2-year-old Selah and 5-month-old Christian. Antoinette's husband, Dwight, recently died of Stage II gastric cancer, and Selah is having trouble understanding her father's death.
75	9	"James Family"	Houston, Texas	December 12, 2008	510	N/A
Mike and Angela have four daughters: 8-year-old Jadon, 5-year-old Amaya, 20-month-old Michal, and 7-month-old McKinley. Mike is an NBA point guard for the New Orleans Hornets. Mike spends most of his day training for the NBA season, and is preparing to leave for the season, leaving Angela to handle the girls on her own. Jadon and Amaya constantly fight each other for their parents' attention. Michal is picking up her older sisters' behavior. The family just moved into a new house, which isn't childproofed and has a large outdoor pool, making it dangerous for the three older girls, who wander outside unsupervised. Despite each of the girls having their own bedrooms, they all prefer to sleep in the playroom.
76	10	"Kerns Family"	Evansville, Wisconsin	January 9, 2009	511	N/A
Shawn and Shannon have three children: 4-year-old identical twins Brandon and Bryce and 2-year-old Brenna. The twins fight like cats and dogs, talk back to their parents, wander outside unattended, and go to their neighbour's house. Brenna is picking up her brothers' behavior. At bedtime, the children are restless and refuse to stay in bed. Shawn and Shannon work different shifts and are rarely home at the same time, which makes it hard for them to agree on how to discipline the children.
77	11	"Gormley-Brickley Family (U.K. Family)"	West London	January 23, 2009	512	N/A
Steve Brickley and Ann Gormley have four children: 4-year-old fraternal twins Aiden and Ella and 2-year-old identical twins Louis and Ciaran. Aiden and Ella fight a lot, while Louis and Ciaran refuse to eat normal food and still eat puréed baby food.
78	12	"Costello Family"	Medina, Ohio	February 6, 2009	513	N/A
Dale and Amy have ten children: 15-year-old Logan, 14-year-old Carley, 12-year-old Chaslyn, 11-year-old Joelle, 9-year-old Corban, 7-year-old Addison, 5-year-old Nolan, 3-year-old Bryson, 2-year-old Cameron, and 8-month-old Keaton. With Dale working as a truck driver and being away for most of the week, juggling ten children isn't easy for Amy and Dale, so they rely on the three older children to look after their seven younger siblings. Meanwhile, the 6 middle children (who are aged 2-11) are acting up. While Bryson and Cameron occasionally throw tantrums at times, the 4 older middle children tend to roughhouse and talk back. All 6 of the middle kids also run around the house. Corban and Nolan are the main offenders as they aggravate and lead the mischief, with Joelle and Addison often joining in. Having to look after most of their younger siblings is stressful for Logan, Carley and Chaslyn. Logan has had a panic attack once, while Carley and Chaslyn have a somewhat strained relationship with their mother and usually react negatively to help with the babysitting. Dale has also developed a drinking problem to deal with his stress.
79	13	"Davis Family"	Deltona, Florida	February 13, 2009	515	N/A
Phil and Debbra have five children: 14-year-old Morgan, 9-year-old Philip, 4-year-old Madison, 3-year-old Tiffany, and 2-year-old Tori. Debbra and Phil are not on the same path as they argue with one another on duties around the house. Morgan is constantly late to school since it takes her a long time to wake up and get her younger siblings ready. She also has a strained relationship with Phil, who is her stepfather, because he criticizes her for the way she dresses and demands too much respect from her. Phil's parenting style is swearing and spanking his children.
80	14	"Sachs Family"	New York, New York	February 20, 2009	517	N/A
Greg and Fanci have two sons: 5-year-old Ryan and 3-year-old Jonathon. Ryan throws temper tantrums when he doesn't get his way and has separation issues from his mother. Jonathon hits a lot and is picking up Ryan's behavior. The boys are so spoiled since Fanci buys them toys three times a week. Bedtime is the family's biggest struggle as the boys won't go to sleep unless one of their parents stays with them.
81	15	"Williams Family (U.K. Family)"	Birmingham, Warwickshire	February 27, 2009	514	N/A
Martin and Natalie Williams have four children: 7-year-old Bethany, 6-year-old Tyler, 5-year-old Lori, and 4-year-old Tia. Tyler rules the household as he is aggressive and swears. Tia is the baby of the family, but she has picked up Tyler's behavior; she kicks and screams at her siblings and parents, while Martin just sits looking on his computer as well as fixing the mobile takeaway.
82	16	"Del Re Family"	Staten Island, New York	March 13, 2009	518	N/A
Joe and Adele have three children: 9-year-old Clarissa and 4-year-old fraternal twins Peter and Deanna. Joe is a NYPD detective and is authoritative towards his children. The twins rule the house as they fight like cats and dogs and throw temper tantrums. When Peter doesn't get his way, he lashes out violently. Deanna is defiant and constantly argues with her parents until she wins. She will also not accept no as an answer. Clarissa is well-behaved, but despite this, Joe is more strict with her than her younger twin siblings, and he interrogates her like she is a suspect.
83	17	"Goldberg Family"	Tucson, Arizona	March 20, 2009	519	N/A
Adam and Shelby have three children: 6-year-old identical twins Jacob and Joshua and 3-year-old Jayden. The twins fight like cats and dogs, talk back, and cuss at their parents. Jacob is prone to violent outbursts, while Joshua says that everything, including discipline, is a joke. Jayden has picked up her brothers' behavior, and if she can't get her way, she will throw temper tantrums until she has her way. Shelby resorts to calling imaginary police officers (actually Adam, who changes his voice over the phone) to get the children to behave.
84	18	"Sacco Family"	Boston, Massachusetts	March 27, 2009	520	N/A
Eric and Elyse have four children: 13-year-old Eric Jr., 10-year-old Ashley, and 3-year-old fraternal twins Luke and Lily. The twins rule the house as they throw tantrums and still use pacifiers, resulting in their mouths getting swollen. They also refuse to sleep in their own beds. Eric does all the work while Elyse slacks lazily, despite her being the stay-at-home parent. She also has an addiction to talking on the phone, which leads to expensive phone bills. Eric Jr. refuses to interact with his family and other people, and has condoms in his room. Well-behaved Ashley feels she doesn't get enough attention from her parents, particularly because of them paying more attention to her younger twin siblings.
85	19	"Porter Family (U.K. Family)"	Bridgwater, Somerset	April 10, 2009	516	N/A
Merrill and Hayley Porter have two children: 9-year-old Maddison and 7-year-old Harry. Princess Maddison rules the house as her ferocious temper is becoming unmanageable. Harry feels left out and has picked up his sister's behavior. Before the children were born, Hayley had a son from her first marriage named Jake, who died just a month before he turned 2.
86	20	"DeMello Family"	Taunton, Massachusetts	April 17, 2009	521	N/A
Don and Dyane have three children: 6-year-old Damon, 4-year-old Dante, and 2-year-old Gianna. The boys are aggressive, destructive, throw temper tantrums, and fight each other like cats and dogs. Damon gets angry and physical with his parents when he doesn't get his way. Dante's constant screaming annoys his parents, while Gianna is picking up her brothers' behavior. Dyane doesn't let the children outside much, which contributes to their bad behavior.
87	21	"Krolikowski Family"	Delray Beach, Florida	May 1, 2009	522	N/A
John and Shannon have four children: 9-year-old Kaleigh, 7-year-old Johnny, 3-year-old Karly (almost 4), and 2-year-old Thomas. Kaleigh is a bully to her younger siblings. Johnny is relentless and refuses to stop arguing until he gets his way, while Thomas is violent and throws temper tantrums. Karly is very sneaky. Shannon only intervenes when one of the kids bleed, to add insult to injury, Shannon has lost control of all of the kids. John is opposed to "modern parenting" as he calls it and uses intimidation, wooden spoons, and spanking. John is controlling and it's making life difficult for Shannon and the kids.

=== Season 6 (2009–10) ===
No. overall	No. in season	Title	Location	Original release date	Prod. code	U.S. viewers (millions)
88	1	"Colier Family"	Cleveland, Georgia	October 23, 2009	601	N/A
Jason and Dawn have four children: 13-year-old Madison (from Dawn's first marriage), 4-year-old Chase, 3-year-old Nathaniel, and 1-year-old Blake. Jason adopted Madison, but their relationship is rocky with all the disagreements they have. Madison talks back and has an attitude problem, according to Jason. She wants Jason's love, but he shows no affection to her and doesn't trust her. Chase and Nathaniel fight, don't listen very well to their parents, and aren't potty trained.
89	2	"Simmons Family"	Midlothian, Virginia	October 30, 2009	604	N/A
Tracy and Debra have two sets of fraternal twins: 7-year-olds Payton and Sophia and 4-year-olds Parker and Sydney. Payton and Sophia talk back to their parents and mistreat their younger siblings. Sydney is defiant and somewhat aggressive. Parker is disrespectful, violent, and destructive. He talks back to his mother, hits, kicks, throws tantrums, and picks fights with his older siblings. Sophia doesn't act out like her siblings, but behaves like a teenager by giving attitude. At dinner, both sets of twins are picky eaters and eat nothing but junk food. After every meal, they eat desserts that are high in sugar, making them very hyperactive and their behavior even worse. Tracy is struggling to discipline the children alone while Debra hides out in the bathroom.
90	3	"Phelps Family"	Hayden, Alabama	November 6, 2009	605	N/A
Jimmy and Amy have three sons: 9-year-old Jacob, 5-year-old Brody, and 2-year-old Aiden. Amy uses spanking to discipline the boys, while Jimmy yells at them. Jacob doesn't act out as much as his younger brothers, but has anger management, while Brody is stubborn and defiant. Aiden rules the roost as he lashes out violently when he refuses to accept no as an answer and refuses to sleep in his own bed. The boys are constantly snacking without permission and leave the pantry and the refrigerator open. Jimmy and Amy's disagreements on disciplining the boys are threatening to put their marriage in jeopardy.
91	4	"Naskiewicz Family"	Royal Palm Beach, Florida	November 13, 2009	602	N/A
Roy and Jen have four children: 12-year-old Jordan, 9-year-old Tanner, 4-year-old Zachary, and 2-year-old Kaia. Jordan and Tanner have a sibling rivalry and fight each other. Zachary is stubborn and has violent outbursts when his sisters get more attention than him. Meanwhile, Kaia is throwing tantrums like any other 2-year-old toddler. When it comes to discipline, Jen is very soft on the children, while Roy has a short temper. Roy and Jen's disagreements on disciplining the children are threatening them with a possible divorce.
92	5	"McGrath Family"	Hamlin, New York	November 27, 2009	603	N/A
Bill and Tammy have three children: 9-year-old Paige, 5-year-old Aiden, and 4-year-old Liam. Eight months earlier, Aiden was diagnosed with type 1 diabetes, which has sparked fear and anxiety for Tammy since her father died from diabetes way before the children were born. Aiden throws tantrums and it's a life or death situation for him as he refuses to eat properly, which not only scares his parents but also threatens his health. Liam acts very aggressive and pushes his parents' buttons. The boys constantly fight with each other, which adds to Aiden's health risk level. Paige is frustrated with her brothers' fighting and Aiden's diagnosis and has too many responsibilities. She also gets annoyed with them coming into her room.
93	6	"Beck Family"	Orange, California	December 11, 2009	606	N/A
Nate and Nicole have three sons: 9-year-old Hunter, 5-year-old Pierson, and 3-year-old Bronson. Hunter was diagnosed with ADHD when he was 8. Pierson is very stubborn and defiant. Bronson spits a lot, swears at his parents, and runs away from the house. He is also aggressive and has just recently been permanently expelled from preschool for his aggressive and disruptive behavior. Hunter doesn't act out as much as his brothers, but he is struggling to concentrate on his homework. Nate and Nicole work in different shifts and are almost never home at the same time to handle the boys.
94	7	"Heredia Family"	Newbury Park, California	December 18, 2009	608	N/A
Joe and Christina have four children: 4-year-old Brandon and 2-year-old fraternal triplets Taylor, Samantha, and Ryan. Christina worries about the children running off when she goes out with them. Brandon is aggressive towards his parents and siblings, hits a lot, and demands attention from his mother. The triplets have picked up their older brother's behavior, and will scream, cry, and fight each other.
95	8	"Benton Family"	Florence, South Carolina	January 8, 2010	611	N/A
Greg and Amber have two sons: 10-year-old Rivers and 8-year-old Hunter. Rivers is very aggressive, bullies Hunter, and struggles with his homework. The boys fight on a daily basis and use violence and racial and homophobic slurs towards each other. Amber and Greg constantly argue, which threatens to sabotage their marriage.
96	9	"Hallenbeck Family"	Mesa, Arizona	January 15, 2010	607	N/A
Kristin has two sons: 6-year-old Jordon and 4-year-old Jaydon. As a single mother, Kristin relies on her parents, Patricia and Cliff, to look after the boys while she occupies herself with her own thing. The boys throw tantrums, are aggressive, swear, and talk back. Disciplining her grandsons is stressful for Patricia as they fight like cats and dogs and sometimes kick her. Kristin's financial problems are preventing her from moving out and she doesn't like the way her mother disciplines the boys.
97	10	"Mann Family"	San Diego, California	February 5, 2010	609	N/A
Mark and Melissa have four children: 5-year-old Naomi and 3-year-old fraternal triplets Norah, Nathaniel, and Madeleine. Mark and Melissa have to deal with their four difficult misbehaving children. Naomi talks back with her parents. The triplets have picked up their older sister's behavior; they will scream, bite, hit, fight, and demand their mother's attention. In addition, their parents use spanking to discipline them. Mark gets overwhelmed when he has to look after the children alone.
98	11	"Johnson Family"	Marietta, Georgia	March 5, 2010	610	N/A
Roy and Kate have three sons: 4-year-old Denver, 3-year-old Logan, and 1-year-old Jack. Roy and Kate own a coffee shop with a supervised play area, but business isn't going smoothly as the boys constantly fight each other and bully the other children. They also annoy their parents' customers and employees. Denver talks back and sometimes runs out of the house, while Logan is the ringleader as he is very aggressive and destructive. He will disrespect the house by hitting, kicking, punching, biting his parents and Jack's diaper, and throwing temper tantrums. Jack is picking up his brothers' behavior.
99	12	"McKinney Family"	Reno, Nevada	March 12, 2010	614	N/A
Ashley has two children: 6-year-old Kayla and 3-year-old Kaiden. As a young single mother, Ashley has trouble keeping control of the children. Kaiden throws tantrums, bites, spits, and hits. He has also been kicked out of two preschools due to his aggressive behavior. Kayla is not as bad as her brother, but she can be defiant, sometimes aggressive, and does anything to get her mother's attention.
100	13	"100th Episode Special"	Various Locations	March 12, 2010	612	N/A
In celebration of the 100th episode of Supernanny, Jo revisits the Newsomes, the Weinsteins, and the Lewises, and gets a progress report from each of them.

=== Season 7 (2010–11) ===
No. overall	No. in season	Title	Location	Original release date	Prod. code	U.S. viewers (millions)
101	1	"Atkinson Family"	Glen Ellyn, Illinois	November 5, 2010	701	N/A
John and Jen have five daughters: 14-year-old Amanda, 13-year-old Abbey (both from Jen's first marriage), 10-year-old Julia (from John's first marriage), 4-year-old Reese, and 2-year-old Maeve. John and his ex-wife share joint custody of Julia. Amanda and Abbey talk back and have a disrespectful attitude towards their mother and stepfather. Reese is stubborn, has separation anxiety from her father, and at one point, Reese screamed so much and so loud, some of her vocal cords broke. Meanwhile, Maeve is picking up Reese's behavior. Julia doesn't act out as much as her sisters.
102	2	"Peterfreund Family"	Chandler, Arizona	November 12, 2010	702	N/A
Keith and Sonya have four sons: 5-year-old Jett, 3-year-old Gage, 2-year-old Trey, and newborn baby Myles. The three older boys are aggressive with each other, which is a concerning safety factor with their baby brother. With Keith working as a flight attendant during the week and being home only on the weekends, Sonya is left to handle the boys on her own. Jett is spoiled and he doesn't listen very well. Gage runs off when he doesn't get his way. Trey in his terrible twos. Baby Myles cannot sleep when his brothers are roughhousing. Keith and Sonya's method of discipline is making the boys eat a dab of hot sauce when they misbehave.
103	3	"Swift Family"	Sacramento, California	November 19, 2010	704	N/A
Tony and Jenny have five children: 11-year-old Jack, 10-year-old Joshua, 7-year-old Sean, 4-year-old Max, and 9-month-old Mia. The family's nanny, Kadie, is left to look after the children with no help from Tony and Jenny, and she is the one who calls for Jo's help instead of the parents. While Jack mostly stays out of the chaos and plays video games, Josh, Sean and Max all run wild in and outside the house unsupervised, threatening their safety. Max will also throw tantrums if he can't get his way. The house is not even babyproofed, which is dangerous for baby Mia as she often puts small things that her brothers leave behind in her mouth. Jenny's mother, Gloria, visits the family on a daily basis, and she is the only one who is able to discipline the boys; however, Tony and Jenny are ungrateful for Gloria's help and refuse to admit what they are doing wrong.
104	4	"Young Family"	Whidbey Island, Washington	December 3, 2010	705	N/A
Ricky and Jenye have three sons: 6-year-old Nicco, 4-year-old Makai, and 21-month-old Crew. Because of Ricky's job, the family has moved four times in the past year and are preparing to move again. The boys throw things, hit, talk back, play aggressively, name call, and do not do as they are told. They even play with dangerous objects such as axes and machetes. Crew refuses to sleep unless he is with his parents.
105	5	"Van Acker Family"	Oak View, California	December 10, 2010	703	N/A
Kevin and Jessica have two children: 6-year-old Emma and 3-year-old Dylan. While parents describe Emma to be a well-behaved and a very spirited little girl, they both have trouble when it comes to raising Dylan. He rules the roost with an iron will. What he wants, he gets. Despite being only 3 years old, he refuses to be potty trained, but still uses diapers. In addition to this, Dylan refuses to eat a healthy and nutritious food, but sugary snacks which caused him to develop anemia. His tantrums are so loud that Emma is struggling to concentrate on her homework.
106	6	"Fernandez Family"	Kissimmee, Florida	December 17, 2010	706	N/A
Jerald and Marla have three children: 12-year-old Desiree, 5-year-old Elias, and 3-year-old Eulisis "Shorty". The boys constantly fight. Shorty rules the household as he throws tantrums, screams and is aggressive. Elias and Desiree don't act out as much as Shorty, but Elias can be quirky at times, and Desiree will talk back and her grades in school have started to go downhill. Jerald is lazy and leaves Marla to discipline the children on her own, and because of this, their marriage is on the rocks.
107	7	"George Family"	San Antonio, Texas	January 7, 2011	707	N/A
Glenn and Joey-Lynn have five daughters: 20-year-old Samantha, 17-year-old Brooke, 10-year-old Savannah, 6-year-old Hailey, and 1½-year-old Haidyn. Samantha also has a 2-year-old daughter named Krissy. Joey-Lynn got pregnant with Samantha when she was 16, and Samantha followed in her mother's footsteps; she got pregnant with Krissy when she was Brooke's age. Samantha and Brooke have a sibling rivalry and constantly argue and curse in front of their sisters, as well as Samantha's daughter Krissy. When the youngest girls act out, Glenn doesn't follow through with the discipline and just yells at them. Joey-Lynn and Glenn feel they have failed as parents.
108	8	"Miller Family"	Phoenix, Arizona	January 14, 2011	708	N/A
David and Meshell have six children: 13-year-old Kesley, 12-year-old Kendall, 10-year-old Meryn, 7-year-old Landon, 5-year-old Ainsley, and 3-year-old Avarie. Meshell has no discipline or control over the children and spoils them while David yells at them and can get physical with them. Landon is the ringleader as he is aggressive, talks back, bullies his sisters, and refuses to do chores. Kesley is left to babysit her younger siblings while her parents are out and is not allowed to go out with her friends. Avarie whines a lot and refuses to give up on her baby bottle.
109	9	"Colombo Family"	Melbourne, Florida	January 21, 2011	709	N/A
Joe and Danielle have three children: 4-year-old Carlo, 3-year-old J.J., and 1-year-old Julia. With Joe working as a full-time lawyer, Danielle is left to handle the children on her own. Carlo is a picky eater and has a loud scream his parents call "the screech". J.J. rules the roost as he hits, pinches, screams, and talks back to his parents. Julia is picking up her brothers' behavior. Joe and Danielle have tried Jo's methods of discipline on their own, but they don't work well for them.
110	10	"Potter Family"	Rochester, New York	February 4, 2011	710	N/A
Chris and Joy have four children: 10-year-old Noah, 7-year-old Ryan, 5-year-old Jake, and 4-year-old Alexa. The kids show no respect for their parents. Joy doesn't follow through with the discipline while Chris constantly yells at the children. Noah's relationship with his father is strained due to his constant yelling, which scares Noah and his younger siblings. Chris' hot temper has put his and Joy's marriage on the rocks.
111	11	"Merrill Family"	Oceanside, California	February 18, 2011	711	N/A
Beckie (without her husband, Chris, who is serving in Afghanistan for a year) has four adopted children: 6-year-old Eddie and 4-year-olds Lydia, Garrett, and Elena. Eddie and Lydia are siblings from Ghana. Garrett and Elena are cousins from Guatemala. There is a communication barrier between Beckie and the Ghanaian children since they were adopted three months earlier. Eddie and Lydia are struggling to adapt to their new lifestyle and speak English, and they express their frustration by exhibiting aggression and talking back. However, Garrett and Elena do not act out as much as Eddie and Lydia, and are fluent in speaking English since they were adopted as babies.
112	12	"DeMott Family"	Bayville, New Jersey	February 25, 2011	712	N/A
Teddy and Nancy have four children: 11-year-old Timmy and 4-year-old fraternal triplets Teddy, Milo, and Giada. Police officer Teddy and Nancy work different shifts and are never home at the same time to handle the children. The triplets fight like cats and dogs, throw things, pick up fights with each other, as well as their older brother Timmy, and draw on the walls. Timmy never gets to spend time alone or with his parents because of his younger siblings. Nancy has given up on time outs and resorts to locking the children in their rooms. Teddy has trouble enforcing the law with the children.
113	13	"Froebrich Family"	Fort Mill, South Carolina	March 4, 2011	713	N/A
Erich and Beverly have five children: 11-year-old Emily, 9-year-old Emmett, 7-year-old Emma-Jo, 4-year-old Emerson, and 1½-year-old Ember. The kids fight constantly, disrespect their parents, hit, pinch and do any kind of bodily harm. Emerson is the main troublemaker out of the brood, he swears, yells, name-calls, is very aggressive, and provokes his parents. Emmett has a hard time with homework, him and Beverly are constantly bumping heads and nothing gets done. Erich and Beverly have harsh disciplinary actions on their children, such as dragging them by their ears and making them eat hot sauce. Beverly's father, Victor, died a year earlier, and since then, her mother, Barbara, has been living with the family. Barbara doesn't approve of her daughter and son-in-law's methods of discipline.
114	14	"Federico Family"	Las Vegas, Nevada	March 11, 2011	714	N/A
Michael and Sylvia have three sons: 5-year-old Dominic, 3-year-old Michael, and 2-year-old Vincent. Michael and Sylvia have no discipline or control over the boys and are still babying them, especially Dominic. Dominic still rides in a stroller, can't brush his own teeth, and can't dress himself. The boys' parents bribe them with sugary snacks to get them to behave.
115	15	"Evans Family"	Houston, Texas	March 18, 2011	715	N/A
Gary has three sons: 6-year-old Michael, 4-year-old Sean, and 3-year-old Dylan. A year earlier, Gary's wife, Jennifer, died of breast cancer, forcing him to retire earlier and become a stay-at-home father. The boys are having trouble understanding their mother's death and act out by screaming and fighting like cats and dogs. The boys are also picky eaters and refuse to eat anything but junk food. When Jennifer was still alive, she was able to potty train Michael and Sean, but she never got a chance to do the same for Dylan. When Sean, the middle child, gets put into timeout because he refuses to listen to Jo, a standoff takes place.

=== Season 8 (2020) ===
No. overall	No. in season	Title	Location	Original release date	Prod. code	U.S. viewers (millions)
116	1	"Braido Family"	Pittstown, New Jersey	January 1, 2020	801	0.64
C.J. and Jessica Braido have four children: 4-year-old Rylie, 2-year-old Gage, and 5-month-old identical baby twins Chase and Dax. Rylie is strong-willed and throws tantrums, and Jessica believes she may have ADHD, because she cannot sit still and has poor impulse control. Gage is picking up Rylie's behavior. He is disobedient and climbs on the furniture like a monkey. The addition of the twins has caused pressure on both parents. To solve the issue, Gage and Rylie and given tablets so they can be quiet while the parents take care of the newborns. The family also doesn't have a chance to spend quality time outside due to the kids' behavior.
117	2	"Corry Family"	Phenix City, Alabama	January 8, 2020	804	0.53
Ben and Maria Corry have four daughters: 7-year-old Lily, 4-year-old Blakely, 2-year-old Tenly, and 1-year-old Taylor. Lily doesn't act out and mostly helps her family with everything. With Ben serving as a military medic in the Army for months at a time, Maria is left on her own to deal with the girls who fight each other, throw temper tantrums, and mess up all over the house. Ben's controversial method of discipline is spanking, and Maria has been suffering from postpartum depression.
118	3	"Richardson Family"	Bogalusa, Louisiana	January 15, 2020	806	0.40
Ralph and Brittany Richardson have six children: 10-year-old Braylon, 8-year-old Aubree, 6-year-old Jaci, 4-year-old Adelyn, 2-year-old River, and 3-month-old Luke. The four oldest children are from Brittany's first marriage, and are struggling to cope with the loss of their biological father, Archie, who died in a car accident a few months earlier. Archie's death has affected the four oldest children's behavior; they lie to their mother and stepfather, fight and bully each other, and they are disobedient. However, River and Luke do not act out as much as the four oldest. Ralph is also grieving over the deaths of his own parents from four years earlier.
119	4	"Ostler Family"	Mesa, Arizona	January 22, 2020	808	0.40
Dane and Nicole Ostler have two sons: 6-year-old Jax and 4-year-old Kaydin. With Dane working as a traveling firefighter, Nicole is often left alone with the boys. Jax is very hyperactive and can't control himself. Both boys can be aggressive with each other, and Nicole is unsuccessful at disciplining them. Before Jax and Kaydin were born, Nicole and Dane had another son named Braylin, who died just two hours after he was born. Since then, Nicole has been suffering from anxiety and fears that she will lose Dane since he has a dangerous job.
120	5	"Garcia Family"	Gilbert, Arizona	January 29, 2020	807	0.49
Anthony and Bethany Garcia have four children: 5-year-old Brooklynn, 4-year-old Harlym, 3-year-old Deuce, and 1-year-old Bronx. With Bethany working as a professional blogger, Anthony has become a full-time stay-at-home father, but it is difficult for him as the children rule the household with their erratic behavior. Deuce is the most wildest of the children. When he was six weeks old, he had a cranial vault reconstruction, and his parents are still babying him. He swears, shows no respect for his family, and hits his sisters. Mealtimes are very expensive; the family has almost never enough time to cook and spends at least $3,000 a month on takeout.
121	6	"Andersen Family"	Greenville, Wisconsin	February 7, 2020	802	0.40
Dan and Miranda Andersen have three children: 8-year-old Ava, 6-year-old William, and 4-year-old Kayla. Ava and William have life-threatening food allergies, and their parents are always on guard for their safety. Bedtime is a disaster as the children throw much tantrums and refuse to go to sleep. Too much screen time contributes to this disaster. Dan and Miranda's marriage is on the rocks because Dan acts defensive and refuses to listen to his wife.
122	7	"Davis Family"	Churchville, Maryland	February 14, 2020	803	0.30
Diarmid and Kristi Davis have three daughters: 7-year-old Makenzie, 4-year-old Karina, and 18-month-old Madilynn. Kristi is overwhelmed and frustrated with having to discipline the girls on her own, while Diarmid avoids having to deal with his wife and daughters' yelling. Kristi has resorted to yelling in order to gain control, and Karina is copying her mother's yelling and aggressive behavior.
123	8	"Tobeck-Lawrence Family"	Spokane, Washington	February 21, 2020	805	0.36
Jeff Lawrence and Crystal Tobeck have five children: 9-year-old Keenan, 8-year-old Mya, 7-year-olds Delanie and Jaxon, and 7-month-old Hudson. Keenan and Delanie are from Jeff's first marriage. Mya and Jaxon are from Crystal's first marriage. Jeff and Crystal recently got married, but are having trouble controlling the four older children. Keenan loves to play jokes on his sister and stepsiblings, but most of the time, they don't find them funny. Mya is responsible, but can be disrespectful at times. Delanie is very hyperactive. Jaxon sometimes throws temper tantrums. The combination of the four older children escalates into chaos. Crystal resorts to raising her voice when she gets frustrated with disciplining the children. Earning money is another issue as the children not only want to get paid for doing chores, but also for doing basic life skills.
124	9	"Jones-Nickolich Family"	Oahu, Hawaii	February 28, 2020	809	0.37
Todd Nickolich and Heather Jones have 4-year-old triplet sons: Skyler, Kai, and Holden. Heather, who is a child psychiatrist, is struggling to discipline her own sons, while Todd spanks his children. Skyler is usually the first to act out and be defiant. Kai acts silly, but gets easily frustrated. Holden cries nonstop when he gets upset. The triplets run wild, talk back, and are disobedient. Heather's mother, Patty, lives with the family, and she also finds it difficult to discipline her grandsons. Her relationship with Todd is strained because he expects too much from her and of Todd's abusive behavior.
125	10	"Collins Family"	Corona, California	March 6, 2020	810	0.40
Tim and Jennifer Collins have 9-year-old adopted twin daughters: Alyssa and Mekenna. Both twins have ADHD, and have never seen a psychiatrist. Their boisterous behavior has started to create anxiety and animosity between Jennifer and Tim as they clash over how to best raise their daughters. There are automated doorbells on the twins' bedroom doors since their parents constantly worry about something happening to their daughters in the middle of the night.
126	11	"Orr Family"	Upstate New York	March 13, 2020	811	0.37
Ian and Jamie Orr have four children: 11-year-old Julian, 10-year-old Gianna, 8-year-old Ava, and 6-year-old Lola. Julian spends his entire time playing violent video games that give him nightmares. He and his sisters are defiant, strong-willed, and constantly picking fights with each other. At mealtimes, all four children are picky eaters, and refuse to eat anything but fried unhealthy meals. Jamie works full time and is struggling to maintain the housework and cooking demands despite the fact that Ian works from home.
127	12	"Brown Family"	Moundville, Alabama	September 1, 2020	812	0.38
Michael and Angela Brown have two sons: 5-year-old Michael Joe. and 2-year-old Paul Mason (nicknamed Pauly B). Pauly hits, swears, throws things, and is disobedient. Michael Joe. isn't as bad as his brother, but he can be defiant at times. The boys prefer to sleep next to their parents, so their bed is in their parents' bedroom. Michael Sr. is reluctant to discipline the boys, leaving Angela frustrated. Angela doesn't trust Michael Sr. not to cheat on her whenever he goes out alone because she has seen him talking to two ex-girlfriends on the phone.
128	13	"Esquivel Family"	Buckeye, Arizona	September 1, 2020	814	0.42
Joe and Clarissa Esquivel have four children: 8-year-old Ethan, 7-year-old Millie, 3-year-old Xander, and 1-year-old Zeke. With Joe working as a police officer, stay-at-home Clarissa has to deal with the antics of her four children. Clarissa and Joe often rely on Ethan to help them look after his younger siblings. Xander is the wildest of the children and constantly hits his siblings. Zeke climbs all over everything like a monkey. Bedtime is way too early for Xander and Zeke, and Clarissa yells at them to make them go to sleep. Ethan and Millie feel they don't get enough attention. Clarissa is overwhelmed with looking after the children alone and fears that if Joe doesn't help her more, they may get divorced.
129	14	"Bailey Family"	Northern California	September 8, 2020	813	0.33
Christina and Katie Bailey have two daughters: 4-year-old Kennedy and 2-year-old Charlotte. Charlotte has anger issues, as well as throwing tantrums. Kennedy is struggling to get used to having a sister and is jealous of Charlotte in various ways. The girls have a sibling rivalry for attention and fight like cats and dogs. Katie has a closer bond with the girls as she isn't as strict as Christina. Katie also bribes them with candy to get them to behave. The girls' mothers get into arguments over how to raise their daughters. Supermarket trips are a disaster as the girls run off in every direction.
130	15	"Bean Family"	Elmwood Park, Illinois	September 8, 2020	815	0.36
David and Nina Bean have four children: 6-year-old Emily, 4-year-old Lucy, 2-year-old Nora, and 1-year-old Dylan. Emily is generally well-behaved and puts others before herself, but tends to act like a third parent to her younger siblings. Lucy is energetic yet disobedient. Nora throws tantrums and cries a lot when she doesn't get her way, while Dylan is a happy baby and constantly smiling. With David working the night shift as a mechanic and Nina working part-time at a restaurant, both parents tag-team to handle the children, leaving them exhausted. Their marriage is on the rocks since they pay more attention to their children than each other. They also can't agree on discipline methods.
131	16	"Zampogna Family"	Collegeville, Pennsylvania	September 15, 2020	817	0.24
Domenic and Angela Zampogna have three children: 7-year-old Domenic Jr., 5-year-old Rosaria, and 4-year-old Giuseppe. The family's biggest struggle is mealtime, since all three children are picky eaters and refuse to eat anything but unhealthy meals, causing them to act up and throw tantrums. Giuseppe throws tantrums like a toddler. Rosaria cries while taking a long time to eat. Angela and Domenic Sr. have a hard time parenting their children.
132	17	"Robertson Family"	Aubrey, Texas	September 15, 2020	816	0.30
Jonathan and Megan Robertson have four children: 12-year-old Presleigh, 8-year-old Raeleigh, 6-year-old Kenzleigh, and 5-year-old Brock. Megan got pregnant with Presleigh when she was 16, and the arrivals of the three younger children have made both parents stressed. The kids are disrespectful, defiant and disobedient towards their parents and fight like cats and dogs. Presleigh has an attitude towards her mother. Jonathan is focused more on video games than parenting his children. He even allows Brock to play with him, and none of the games are age-appropriate for Brock.
133	18	"Sutherland Family"	Chandler, Arizona	September 22, 2020	818	0.27
Justin and Amy Sutherland have four children: 3-year-old Jett, 2-year-old Rio (pronounced Rhea), and 8-month-old identical twins Tex and Crosby. When Rio was 9 months old, she got burned while taking a bath in the sink after accidentally turning the cold water off. Rio stopped breathing in a burn ward, but was able to regain consciousness. Following her recovery, Rio became very aggressive with her family. Since Rio's accident, Amy has become overprotective of Rio and her siblings, and rarely disciplines her. Amy doesn't want anyone to watch her kids, so she stays home wrangling all 4 children. Jett escapes out of his parents' room during bedtime and screams sometimes.

== Specials (2008–10) ==
Title	Location	Original release date	Prod. code	U.S. viewers (millions)
"Super-manny Special (Marko Family)"	Temecula, CA	November 14, 2008	507	4.85
Doug and Tracy have three daughters: 7-year-old Gwen, 4-year-old Alexa, and 8-month-old Jacinda. Gwen deals with anger and has no respect for her parents. She also can't concentrate on her homework, and has a strained relationship with her father due to his overly harsh methods of discipline. Alexa is picking up Gwen's aggressive behavior.
"Super-manny Special (Griswold Family)"	Falcon, CO	January 29, 2010	613	N/A
Allen and Roberta have four children: 16-year-old Brianna, 11-year-old Lauren, 7-year-old Joe, and 2-year-old Alex. The two older children of each gender, Brianna and Joe, are the most problematic in the family. The two shout every curse word in the book. Joe rules the roost and, like his parents, has severe anger-management problems. He is out of control, throws epic tantrums, and pushes his siblings around, and has even locked the rest of the family out of their own house. Whenever the family goes out to the supermarket, Joe runs around, writes slurs and foul words on the freezer doors, and breaks bottles and jars in the aisles. While Brianna isn't as bad as Joe, she has an underage drinking problem, partly due to hanging out with college kids and the parents' lack of authority. One night, she nearly passed away from alcohol poisoning. Allen and Roberta themselves have short tempers with their children as they constantly yell at them when they misbehave. Lauren and Alex didn't act out as much as Brianna and Joe.
