= Supernanny (American TV series) =

US-American version of the British television programme Supernanny

- Genre: Reality
- Presented by: Jo Frost
- Opening theme: "Be Good Johnny" by Men at Work
- Country of origin: United States
- Original language: English
- No. of seasons: 8
- No. of episodes: 133 (list of episodes)

Production
- Camera setup: Multi-camera
- Running time: 42 minutes
- Production company: Ricochet Television

Original release
- Network: ABC
- Release: January 17, 2005 – March 18, 2011
- Network: Lifetime
- Release: January 1 – September 22, 2020

Related
- Supernanny; America's Supernanny; Jo Frost: Nanny On Tour

Supernanny is an American reality television series presented by British professional nanny Jo Frost that documents parents struggling with various aspects of raising their children (e.g. their children's behavior, mealtime, potty training, etc.). The series originally premiered on ABC on January 17, 2005, and concluded on March 18, 2011, after seven seasons; it would later air on Lifetime on January 1, 2020, where it would later conclude after 20 episodes, on September 22, 2020.

== Premise ==
The show, featuring professional nanny Jo Frost, is an adaptation of the British series of the same name (also featuring Frost). Frost devotes each episode to helping a family where the parents are struggling with their child-rearing. Through instruction and observation, she shows the parents alternative ways to discipline their children and regain order in their households. Frost is a proponent of the "naughty chair" theory of discipline and is strictly opposed to physical punishment.

== Broadcast ==
The show aired on ABC from January 17, 2005, to March 18, 2011. Two specials starring Mike Ruggles (also known as Super-Manny) instead of Frost were released on November 14, 2008, and January 29, 2010, respectively. In addition, seven episodes from the original British series were edited and re-released for the American series. A spin-off of the show starring Deborah Tillman was produced between 2011–2013 and was titled America's Supernanny.

On March 27, 2019, it was announced that Supernanny would return for a 20-episode season that premiered on January 1, 2020, on Lifetime with Frost as host again. The first 10 episodes from the season also began airing in the UK on July 20, 2020, on E4. The remaining set of episodes started airing on March 5, 2021.

In Australia, the series aired on the Nine Network.

== Format ==
The show begins with a short introductory clip of highlights from the episode; after the title segment, Frost is featured riding in a London TXII with the vanity plate "SPRNANNY", where she shows a DVD player with the family's submission video. The submission video introduces the parent(s), children, with their ages, and in some cases other important family members, single parents, as well as the parents' occupations (including if one parent stays at home with the children) and the specific issues the family is facing including clips, concluded by a final call for help alongside a reassuring statement from Frost telling the family she's "on her way".

Frost spends the first day in observation mode, taking mental notes to assess the situation and to devise a plan of action. If a situation is especially serious, she will point out the matter for immediate action. After the first day, she holds the parents' meeting (with clips showing the parents initial reaction), where she praises the family for their beautiful children and then mentions the problems noted. (Earlier episodes had the meeting at the end of the first day; later episodes have it the following day.)

Frost then returns with tools designed to assist the parents in child-rearing. For example, if she determines that the children are misbehaving due to a lack of scheduled activity time with the parents, she will bring in a set schedule, customized for the family's needs. She frequently devises "house rules" for the family. Sometimes the rules are predetermined by Frost, and other times she provides a blank paper and has the family devise them. Frequent issues on the show involve discipline (as Frost does not endorse spanking as means, she introduces the family to the "naughty chair/step" timeout) and sleep separation.

After a time, Frost leaves the houses to allow the family to implement her actions on their own. The parents' actions are still being filmed, and upon her return Frost calls another parents' meeting to praise them for doing well and/or show them where they went wrong. She then provides reinforcement as needed.

The ending shows the family saying goodbye to Frost. Earlier episodes feature the family at a later time showing how well her techniques have worked, along with (after the credits, often featuring a blooper segment) a teaser segment for the next week's episode.

Frost usually does not call in outside assistance, however, she has on more than one occasion:

- One family was dealing with an autistic son; Frost called in a clinical professor with expertise in autism to assist the family in communicating with their son.
- Another family (from the Chicago area) had a son showing signs of disrespect and future juvenile delinquency; Frost called in Chicago native and NBA superstar Dwyane Wade to speak with him.
- A third family had the father exhibiting classic signs of abuse (especially toward the female members of the family); Frost called in a social worker with expertise in abusive behavior, as well as a woman who was abused by her father and, as a result, made poor decisions in relationships.
- In another case, the father was an alcoholic, and Frost located a nearby Alcoholics Anonymous support group for him to attend.
- One family had deaf parents who were being taken advantage of by the younger children, who were not deaf; Frost called in an interpreter to help with communication.
- One family was dealing with a son who has type 1 diabetes, so Frost compiled a chart of celebrities living with diabetes and called upon a professional snowboarder who is diabetic and runs snowboard camps for children who are diabetic.
- One family was dealing with a daughter who had Down syndrome; Frost called in the professor from the episode with the autistic boy to help the girl and enlist the family in speech therapy.
- During the latest series Jo took the mother to review her medication with a doctor to support her anxiety.

== Home media ==
2 DVD releases of Supernanny were released in Region 1 in the USA on 16 May 2006 and another in 2010.

- Supernanny: Season One
- Supernanny: When Little Kids Cause Big Headaches

== Episodes ==
Season	Episodes	Originally released		
Season	Episodes	First released	Last released	Network
1	12	January 17, 2005	May 11, 2005	ABC
2	19	September 23, 2005	September 18, 2006	ABC
3	15	December 4, 2006	August 6, 2007	ABC
4	20	January 2, 2008	June 25, 2008	ABC
5	22	October 3, 2008	May 1, 2009	ABC
6	14	October 23, 2009	March 12, 2010	ABC
7	15	November 5, 2010	March 18, 2011	ABC
8	18	January 1, 2020	September 22, 2020	Lifetime
