= Ricochet (TV production company) =

Television production company

- Type: Subsidiary
- Industry: Television production
- Founded: 1995; 31 years ago, in London
- Headquarters: London and Brighton (UK); Los Angeles (USA)
- Key people: Joanna Ball (CEO)
- Products: Supernanny; Too Big to Walk; The Real Housewives of New York City; Fat March; It's Me or the Dog; The World's Toughest Tribes; Risking It All; No Going Back; How Not to Decorate; The Alaska Experiment; Who Rules the Roost; Selling Houses; Born to Be Different; Sex Tips for Girls; Breaking Into Tesco; Extreme Dreams; Living in the Sun; The Repair Shop
- Owner: Skydance Corporation
- Parent: Warner Bros. Television Studios UK (2005–present)
- Website: www.ricochet.co.uk

Ricochet is a British television production company that produces factual and entertainment programmes for broadcast by networks in both the United Kingdom and the United States. It has been owned Warner Bros. Television Studios UK since 2005.

== Programming ==
=== Current Productions ===
- Cowboy Builders (Five)
- Unbreakable (Five)
- It's Me or the Dog (Channel 4, Sky and Animal Planet)
- Supernanny (Channel 4, ABC and Lifetime)
- Living in the Sun (BBC One)
- Extreme Dreams with Ben Fogle (BBC Two)
- The Real Housewives of New York City (Bravo)
- The Alaska Experiment (Discovery)
- Breaking into Tesco (Five)
- Food Unwrapped (Channel 4)
- The Repair Shop (BBC One/BBC Two)

=== Previous Productions ===
2011
Born to Be Different (Channel 4)

2007
My Child Won't Eat (ITV1)
The Mummy Diaries (Channel 4)
Into The Big Wide World (Channel 4)
Colin and Justin's Home Show (UKTV Style)
My New Home (Channel 4)
Fat March (ABC)
It's Me or the Dog (Channel 4)
My Crazy Life (Channel 4)
The World's Toughest Tribes (Discovery)
Britain's Worst Teeth (BBC Three)
Sex In Court (E4)
Selling Houses Abroad (Channel 4)
Clutter Nutters (CBBC)

2006
Too Big to Walk (Channel 4)
No Going Back (Channel 4)
Risking it All (Channel 4)
Admission Impossible (Channel 4)
Inside Spontaneous Human Combustion (Sky One)
Selling Houses (Channel 4)
How Not to Decorate (Five)
Who Rules the Roost (BBC Three)

2005
Wanted: New Mum and Dad (Channel 4)
Mirror, Signal, Manoeuvre (BBC One)
The Ultimate Celebrity Fashion Frock-Ups (Five)
The 20 Worst Interior Design Crimes in Your Home (Five)
The 20 Things We Love to Hate About Builders (Five)
Flying Heavy Metal (Discovery) It's Me or the Dog (Channel 4)

2004
Tetris: From Russia With Love (BBC Four)
The 20 Quickest Ways to Make Money on your Property (Five)
The 20 Quickest Ways to Lose Money on your Property (Five)
Housetrapped in the Sun (Channel 4)
Supernanny (Channel 4)
Passion Never Dies (BBC Two)
Taking Care: Rough Diamonds (BBC Three)

2002
St Tropez Summer (E4)
More Sex Tips for Girls (Channel 4)
Why Pay Men for Sex (Channel 4)
River Cottage Forever (Channel 4) (Co-production with Keo Films)
Future Sex (Channel 4)
The Ultimate Rule Breakers (Channel 4)
Baring All (Channel 4)
Mel B's ex - The Jimmy Gulzar Story (BBC Choice)
Dome Heist (Channel 4)
Changing Sex (Channel 4)

2000
Posh Rock (E4)
Sex Tips for Girls (Channel 4)
Nigella Bites (Channel 4) (Co-production with Pacific)
Real Gardens (Channel 4) (Co-production with Ark Productions)
Strippers (TV programme) (E4)
The Twentieth Century Garden (Channel 4)
