= Outright Distribution =

Television distribution company

- Formerly: Screentime Partners (2003–2006)
- Company type: Subsidiary
- Industry: Television distribution
- Predecessor: Wall to Wall International
- Founded: August 2003; 22 years ago
- Defunct: 2010
- Fate: Folded into Warner Bros. UK
- Headquarters: London, United Kingdom
- Key people: Chris Bonney; Tom McClelland; Jess Khanom; Leonora Teale; Belinda Ronalds; David Asher; Aubrey Clarke; Kelly Bordiuk
- Products: Waterloo Road; Who Do You Think You Are? Footballers' Wives; Supernanny; It's Me or the Dog; Rock Rivals; Bad Lad's Army; No Going Back
- Parent: Screentime (2003–2006); Shed Media Group (2006–2010)

Outright Distribution (formerly Screentime Partners) was a global TV distribution company headquartered in London and owned by Warner Bros. Television Productions UK.

Outright specialises in format and finished programme distribution. With an expanding library from Shed Media companies' content and growing quality third party business, Outright Distribution had a large catalogue of programme brands, selling over 2,000 hours in over 125 different territories worldwide.

In Broadcast magazine's Top Ten Most Used UK Distributors survey in March 2008, Outright Distribution was placed 7th.

Outright Distribution became part of the Shed Media Group in September 2006. On 5 August 2010, Warner Bros. Television secured a 55.75% stake in Shed Media. Warner Bros. completed its acquisition of a majority stake in Shed Media on 14 October. Under the deal, Shed Media will remain an independent company but Outright Distribution would be folded into Warner's UK operations.
