= Ryan Van Duzer =

American filmmaker (born 1979)

- Born: Ryan Van Duzer; January 21, 1979 (age 47)
- Other name: Duzer
- Occupation: Filmmaker
- Website: Duzertv.com

Ryan Van Duzer (born 21 January 1979) is an American filmmaker.

== Professional work ==
Duzer was the host of 'Remote and Refined,' an outdoor adventure web series on Men's Journal, and he also appeared in the viral video "Sh*t Cyclists Say" on YouTube to promote People for Bikes campaign. In 2018, Ryan hosted Pure Cycles TV on YouTube.
