= Clutter Nutters =

2006 British children's TV show

- Genre: Game Show
- Presented by: Nigel Clarke; Hannah Sandling
- Country of origin: United Kingdom
- Original language: English
- No. of seasons: 1
- No. of episodes: 15

Production
- Production company: Ricochet

Original release
- Network: CBBC Channel; BBC Two
- Release: 2006 – 2006

Clutter Nutters was a children's TV show produced by Ricochet in 2006 for the CBBC Channel. Each episode focuses on two contestants, who clear their rooms of unneeded objects and sell them to make money and earn prizes.

== Guide and aims ==
1. Clear all the clutter from contestants bedrooms.
2. Weigh all the cleared items
3. Separate clutter into piles which you want to keep (Love it) or get rid of (Lose it).
4. Complete tasks in which you have to reduce the Lose It pile, e.g. selling at a market, holding a yard sale or using a computer to hold an internet auction.
5. Put what you weren't able to get rid of into another two piles – one to be recycled and one to donate
6. Whatever is unusable (e.g. old colouring books or broken toys) is thrown away (into Colin the Dustbin, a 'clutter compactor').
7. Contestants weigh their remaining items.
8. Whichever contestant has lost the most 'clutter' wins a prize, usually tickets to the theatre, football game or other recreational outing.
9. Both contestants are shown their new rooms which have been redecorated by the presenters – regardless of whether they want it or not.

Forfeits include two 5 kg teddy bears which are awarded to the contestants who sells or donates the least amount of clutter

== Selling ==
Each team must battle it out to raise the most money and avoid the 5 kg teddies. Selling usually includes online auctions, car boot sales, yard sales, auctions or going to a market.

== Recycle and Donate ==
Contestants have three minutes to sort their remaining items into recyclable and donatable categories. The contestant with the smallest remaining quantity receives a second 5 kg teddy bear.

== Weigh-in ==
There are two weigh-ins. The first weigh-in is when you weigh all your clutter from your bedrooms. It usually gets compared to an animal such as a panda or a jaguar. The final weigh-in is when you put your love it piles on the scales which tells you who has won.

== Prizes ==
The winner gets a prize which is usually something like a ticket to a football match. Both winner and runner-up get a surprise bedroom makeover.

== Characters ==
- Colin: a dustbin
- 5 kg teddies: your forfeits

== Mini Clutter Nutters ==
Mini Clutter Nutters is a cut down version of the show which is usually giving you top selling tips.

== Presenters ==
- Nigel Clarke
- Hannah Sandling

== Episodes ==
1. Oscar and Alabama
2. Lucy and Yasmin
3. Kieran and Amber
4. Mariatou and Yassin
5. Kirstie and Daniel
6. Tara and Bethan
7. Ellie and Chris
8. Chloe and Callum
9. Jessica and Sophie
10. Olivia and Ellie
11. Adam and Alex
12. Keely and Jessica
13. Alfie and Luke
14. Tom and Emily
15. Tom and Olivia
