= Warner Bros. Television Studios UK =

British TV content creator and distributor

Warner Bros. Television Production UK Limited
- Formerly: Shed Media Group (1998–2014)
- Type: Subsidiary
- Industry: Television production and distribution
- Founded: 1998; 28 years ago in London, England, United Kingdom
- Headquarters: London and Brighton (UK); Los Angeles (USA)
- Key people: Nicholas Southgate; Terry Downing
- Owner: Skydance Corporation
- Parent: Warner Bros. International Television Production (2010–present)
- Subsidiaries: Ricochet; Twenty Twenty Television; Wall to Wall Media
- Website: www.wbitvp.com

Warner Bros. Television Production UK (formerly Shed Media Group) is a British creator and distributor of television content. The Group produces long-running television brands in drama, factual, documentary, factual entertainment, and history. Established in 1998 as Shed Productions, the company floated on AIM (Alternative Investment Market) in March 2005. The group has grown significantly since flotation and to date, five award-winning media companies: Ricochet, Twenty Twenty Television, Wall to Wall Media, and Outright Distribution have all joined the group. In 2010, it was bought by Time Warner.

== History ==
Shed was established in 1998, specialising in producing long-running returnable drama including Waterloo Road, Bad Girls and Footballers' Wives. In March 2005, the company listed on AIM (Alternative Investment Market).

In November 2005, Shed Media Group had announced that they've acquired Brighton-based Factual entertainment television production company Ricochet, a leading production company specialising in factual entertainment. Ricochet created and produces global brand Supernanny. Other programmes include: Extreme Dreams, It's Me or the Dog, Breaking into Tesco and Blood, Sweat and T-shirts.

Shed acquired Outright Distribution (formerly Screentime Partners) in September 2006. The acquisition was a strategic move in order to maximise exploitation of the Group's IP through its own in-house distribution company, whilst growing third-party business.

In September 2007, Shed Productions had announced that they've continued their acquisition spree by taking over BAFTA award-winning British independent factual entertainment production house Twenty Twenty and placing it under Shed's combined holding company which was being named Shed Media Group. Brands include: The Choir, That'll Teach 'Em, Brat Camp, Evacuation, and The Sorcerer's Apprentice.

In November 2007, Shed Media Group had announced that they've acquired British scripted and unscripted television production company Wall to Wall Media with Wall to Wall Media's distribution division Wall to Wall International being integrated into Shed's own distribution arm Outright Distribution. A multiple BAFTA winner, Wall to Wall produces long-running brands including BBC One's Who Do You Think You Are? and New Tricks. Reality dramas include: 1940's House and Frontier House. Docu-dramas include: The Day Britain Stopped and Filth: The Mary Whitehouse Story. In 2008, Wall to Wall's Man on Wire won an Academy Award Oscar in the best Documentary Feature category.

In October 2008, Shed Media announced its expansion to Scotland by launching its own Scottish production division based in the newly-established Digital Media Quarter, which has officially launched at the Pacific Quay in Glasgow, Scotland as Shed Media would join The Glasgow School of Art’s Digital Design Studio, which was also moving to the newly formed building at the same area.

In November 2009, Shed Media's Scottish production division Shed Media Scotland had promoted Edward Levan, head of development of Shed Media's fellow production subsidiary Ricochet to become head of factual at Shed Media's Scottish production division Shed Media Scotland.

At the end of July 2010, French entertainment production/distribution group Zodiak Entertainment, based in Paris, had brought in a minority stake in the British television production company Shed Media, ahead of the acquisition takeover of the British indie production studio Shed Media by the American media comgoulemene and owner behind the famous American film & television studio Warner Bros., Time Warner,

On 5 August 2010, Warner Bros. Television secured a 55.75% stake in Shed Media. Warner Bros. completed its acquisition of a majority stake in Shed Media on 14 October. Under the deal, Shed Media will remain an independent company, but its global distribution arm, Outright Distribution, would be folded into the Warner's UK operation. The Shed management team held on to a 21.37% shareholding, with the remaining stake being split between a group of 27 key staff members. In January 2012, Shed Media Group had announced that they've launched an entertainment and comedy production company named Yalli Productions with a focus on developing Warner Bros' library formats to the UK market as well their own formats with Bert Gray heading the production company as the managing director.

In April 2012, Shed Media Group had announced that they've acquired a majority stake in London-based British factual entertainment television production company Renegade Pictures with its team continued to operate the acquired company in their London base as Renegade's production output will now be distributed by Warner Bros.' international television distribution division. Time Warner acquired 100% of Shed and renamed the group Warner Bros. Television Productions UK in June 2014. As of 2015 the name was completely phased out and all companies got completely integrated with new websites, however Shed Productions and Watershed became defunct with no new websites, little mentioning or integration.

In January 2015, Warner Bros. Television Production UK announced that they've merged their production company Watershed Television with Twenty Twenty to form a boarding team with Watershed retained its branding under Twenty Twenty along with managing director Mark Rubens continued to lead the label under Twenty Twenty joining them as their senior creative producer. The name was changed from Warner Bros. Television Productions UK to Warner Bros. Television Studios UK in 2020.

In February 2017, Warner Bros. Television Production UK announced that its managing directors Clare Hungate and Nick Emmerson had departed the British television production company Warner Bros. Television Production UK after three years of overseeing this group, beginning in 2014. Three days later on the 13th of that month, Warner Bros. Television Production UK had restructured its operations and had moved its British production companies which were Wall to Wall Media, Twenty Twenty Television, Renegade Pictures, Ricochet and Yalli Productions into its London-based parent Warner Bros. International Television Production following the departure of Clare Hungate and Nick Emmerson.

By the end of July 2025, when Warner Bros. Television Studios UK' parent Warner Bros. Discovery announced it was splitting into two companies which were "Warner Bros." and "Discovery Global" a month prior in June of that year, Warner Bros. Television Studios UK including its subsidiaries Wall to Wall Media, Twenty Twenty Television and Ricochet and its parent Warner Bros. International Television Productions will be moving to the newly established company behind Warner Bros. Discovery's global TV networks group Discovery Global from mid-2026 with CFO Gunnar Wiedenfels will be leading Warner Bros. Television Studios UK and its parent through his leadership; however, the new company behind Warner Bros. Discovery's studios & streaming group Warner Bros. will retain the Yalli Productions library and British animation studio Hanna-Barbera Studios Europe following the split. However, on February 27, 2026, Paramount Skydance announced its intent to acquire the entirety of WBD, resulting in the split to be completely scrapped. On October 6, 2026, WBITVP, along with Warner Bros. Television Studios UK, was moved back to the Warner Bros. Television Group after the merger of Paramount and WBD is complete, which now known as Skydance Corporation, thus reuniting Warner Bros. Television Studios UK with Hanna-Barbera Studios Europe.

== Reception ==
=== Awards and nominations ===
Shed Media was nominated for Float of the Year in 2005 and won Deal of the Year 2006 in the Quoted Company Awards for its acquisition of Ricochet. Several of Shed's programmes have won BAFTA, RTS, Rose D'Or and National Television Awards.
