= Pure Cycles =

Bicycle company

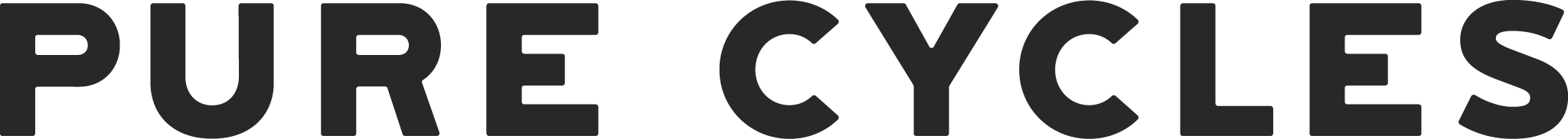
- Company type: Private
- Industry: Bicycles
- Predecessor: Pure Fix Cycles
- Founded: 2010; 15 years ago
- Headquarters: Los Angeles, CA, United States
- Area served: United States, Canada, Europe
- Key people: Michael Fishman (Founder); Jordan Schau (Founder); Austin Stoffers (Founder)
- Products: Bicycles & Bicycle Accessories
- Website: purecycles.com

Pure Cycles, is a bicycle company based in Los Angeles, California that was founded by Michael Fishman, Jordan Schau, Zachary Schau and Austin Stoffers in 2010, as Pure Fix Cycles.

The company was the first to introduce the glow in the dark bicycle.

On April 20, 2020, Pure Cycles was sold to JBI.bike, a family-owned, Florida based bike and parts distributor with a bicycle division including brands such as Sun Bicycles, and Black-Ops.
