= America's Supernanny =

American television program (2011–2013)

- Also known as: America's Supernanny: Family Lockdown
- Genre: Documentary
- Starring: Deborah Tillman
- Country of origin: United States
- Original language: English
- No. of seasons: 2
- No. of episodes: 16

Production
- Executive producers: Abigail Harvey; Gena McCarthy; Jim Rapsas; Nick Emmerson; Rob Sharenow; Stephanie Schwam
- Production company: Shed Media

Original release
- Network: Lifetime
- Release: November 29, 2011 – March 13, 2013

Related
- Supernanny (US version)

America's Supernanny (also known as America's Supernanny: Family Lockdown) is an American reality documentary television series broadcast on Lifetime. It is a spin-off on the ABC series Supernanny. The series aired from November 29, 2011, to March 13, 2013.

== Production history ==
On August 9, 2011, Lifetime announced they had green-lit the series for an eight episode first season but the network had yet to decide who was going to lead the series. On October 6, 2011, after numerous casting calls, it was announced that Deborah Tillman was chosen to be "America's Supernanny".

On December 4, 2012, Lifetime announced that the series had been renewed for a second season, which debuted on January 8, 2013, with the new title America's Supernanny: Family Lockdown. Tillman visited the homes of families who requested her help to raise their children, and the families were visited on notice, rather than by surprise.

== Episodes ==
=== Season 1 (2011–2012) ===
No. overall	No. in season	Title	Location	Original release date
1	1	"The Weeks-Suszczynski Family"	Accord, New York	November 29, 2011
Mark Suszczynski and Kim Weeks have three children: 9-year-old Neva, 5-year-old Nora, and 4-year-old Tate. With Mark out often, Kim is stuck handling her three misbehaving children. Neva feels left out and has low self-esteem, prompting her to act like a teenager, and wear makeup. Nora is very clingy, not wanting her parents to leave her when they leave the house. Tate is very aggressive and defiant, often spitting, kicking, and screaming at his parents.
2	2	"The Paul-Sheckles Family"	Camby, Indiana	December 6, 2011
Amy Paul and Mandy Sheckles have six children: 9-year-old Amanda, 7-year-old Bradley, and 2 1/2-year-old fraternal quadruplets Harper, Kennedy, Kerry, and Tillie. Amy and Mandy have different approaches to parenting, which has caused issues with the kids. The quadruplets are constantly doing dangerous things, screaming, running, and making messes. Amanda has become a third parent and Bradley is lost in the mix.
3	3	"The Denton Family"	Danville, New Hampshire	December 13, 2011
Bruce and Melissa Denton have four children: 9-year-old Dillon, 4-year-old Ayla, 3-year-old Cameron, and 1-year-old Mackenna. With an extraordinarily busy schedule, it is difficult for Bruce and Melissa to keep track of their kids. Dillon is defiant and exhibits violence towards his parents and sisters. The girls are picking up Dillon's behavior. Mackenna is attached to her mother.
4	4	"The Carzell Family"	Charlotte, North Carolina	December 20, 2011
Sam and Nicole Carzell have ten children: 14-year-old Desmond, 12-year-old Deshon, 11-year-old Desja, 10-year-old Damir, 9-year-old Nevada, 5-year-old Septimber, 4-year-old fraternal twins Brook-Lyne and Bailey, 3-year-old Ashton, and 1-year-old Morgan. Sam and Nicole use violence and anger on their kids when they misbehave. The eight middle children fight and wrestle with each other constantly do not listen to their parents. Deshon, Desja, and Damir bully Nevada about her skin color and beat her up on a regular basis. Sam and Nicole are fed up and have resorted to beating their children with belts, sticks, manhandling them and shouting at them. Desmond has become a third parent to his younger siblings.
5	5	"The Gregg Family"	Independence, Kentucky	December 27, 2011
Bill and Traci Gregg have five children: 6-year-old triplets Roman, Xavier, and Giovanni; 4-year-old Armani; and 1-year-old Scarlet. The triplets are defiant, hot-tempered, and run wild. Armani feels overlooked so he has started acting out, swearing, being disruptive, and doing dangerous things. Scarlett is picking up on her brothers' behavior. All four boys do not listen at all and cause destruction. Traci and Bill own a bakery. Traci works morning shifts and Bill works night shifts, causing their marriage to become strained.
6	6	"The Fitzgerald Family"	San Jose, California	January 3, 2012
Andy and Jenny Fitzgerald have four children: 10-year-old Jake, 9-year-old Dawson, 8-year-old Garrett, who was born with Down syndrome, and 3-year-old Carly. Garrett has behavior issues and wanders off constantly leaving his other three siblings neglected. Carly whines to get her mother's attention. Jake and Dawson feel sad and displeased with the lack of attention they receive. Andy is a pastor and focuses more on his work than on the family.
7	7	"The Edwards Family"	Summerville, Georgia	January 24, 2012
Duke and Mary Edwards have two sons: 8-year-old Austin, who was born with ADHD, and 7-year-old Brandon. Duke's 12-year-old great niece, Aryel, also lives with the family. Austin is verbally and physically abusive towards his family, mainly directed at his mother. Aryel has a poor attitude and feels insecure about herself so she uses makeup. Mary spoils her Brandon and Austin and does everything for them. Duke is disabled so he cannot discipline Austin.
8	8	"The Skluzacek Family"	Montgomery, Minnesota	January 31, 2012
Bruce and Chris Skluzacek have four sons: 8-year-old Landon, 5-year-old identical twins Luke and Connor, and 3-year-old Evan. The boys cause complete chaos in their household by hitting, yelling, and swearing.

=== Season 2 (2013) ===
No. overall	No. in season	Title	Location	Original release date	US viewers (millions)
9	1	"The Guido Family"	Rutherford, New Jersey	January 8, 2013	1.22
Melissa Guido has three sons: 13-year-old Gavin and 6-year-old identical twins Mateo and Genaro. Melissa's parents, Michael and Patricia, also live with the family. Mateo and Genaro fight like cat and dog, disrespect Melissa, and refuse to go to bed. Gavin disrespects his mom and grandparents and has anger issues. Melissa resorts to yelling and hitting to control her children, she also smokes cigarettes to cope with the stress.
10	2	"The Zurlinden Family"	Hamilton, Ohio	January 15, 2013	1.03
Jay Zurlinden has three children: 11-year-old Gabby, 10-year-old Kylie, and 6-year-old Jayden. Jay's fiancée, Cassie, has a 5-year-old son named Brayden. With Cassie and Jay's marriage being a month away, they're nowhere near happily ever after as the house is filled with fighting and chaos. Gabby buries herself in technology. Soon to be stepbrothers Brayden and Jayden fight like cat and dog and throw fits. Kylie is extremely messy. Jay is a professional wrestler and focuses on his career more than his family leaving Cassie at her wits' end.
11	3	"The Miller Family"	Milwaukee, Wisconsin	January 22, 2013	0.89
Jane Miller has five children: 10-year-old Breonne, 9-year-old Isaiah, 7-year-old Aaliyah, 5-year-old Arielle, and 3-year-old Isaac. After Jane and her ex-husband Bronzell Miller divorced, the structure from her home is gone and the children have taken over by swearing, bullying, yelling, and being defiant. Isaac refuses to go to bed at night. Jane finds it impossible to control her children. Isaiah has PTSD due to the divorce which makes him explosive and difficult to deal with.
12	4	"The Nullet-Boccanfuso Family"	Smithtown, New York	January 29, 2013	1.14
Chris Nullet and Jennifer Boccanfuso have five children: 19-year-old Adrianna, 10-year-old Olivia, 7-year-old Andrew, 5-year-old Frankie, and 4-year-old Hope. Because of her parents fighting, Adrianna took over parenting roles for her siblings as well as taking care of her newborn. The other kids are running wild, Andrew is the ringleader, he swears, kicks, hits and is very explosive and violent. Frankie copies Andrew's behavior, both boys fight aggressively like cat and dog. Hope still uses a pacifier and sleeps in a crib. Chris and Jennifer are constantly clashing on how to handle the kids which is leading to a possible divorce.
13	5	"The Clarkston Family"	Lafayette, Louisiana	February 20, 2013	0.65
Patrick and Aleashia Clarkston have seven children: 16-year-old Deonte, 14-year-old Tyler, 10-year-old Diana, 8-year-old P.J., 6-year-old Destiny, 4-year-old Alayni, and 1-year-old Xavier. The children run rampant around the house so Aleashia and Patrick have resorted to corporal punishment, htting their children with belts and forcing the to face the wall with their hands up. Xavier bites and hits constantly. Deonte and Tyler have sibling rivalry.
14	6	"The Wells Family"	Ringgold, Georgia	February 27, 2013	0.56
Jernard and Keena Wells have seven children: 17-year-old Carleisha, 11-year-old Jernard Jr., 10-year-old Kameron, 8-year-old Keenan, 6-year-old Jacobe, 5-year-old Jasmine, and 3-year-old Zoe. Jernard Sr is an executive chef has passed down his love of food down to the kids but in a bad way while Keena uses snacks and electronics to distract the children, but it has not worked as the six younger kids roughhouse and yell. Jernard Jr is constantly eating junk food and overeating which has caused him to be overweight.
15	7	"The Arnold Family"	Wernersville, Pennsylvania	March 6, 2013	0.48
Alex and Kelly Arnold have five children: 11-year-old Abby, 8-year-old Gabe, 5-year-old twins Ben and Sam, and 4-year-old Luke. Alex is rude and passive-aggressive to the children while Kelly doesn't correct her children's behavior in public in fear of an embarrassing scene; due to this the boys are running rampant around the house. The whole family is addicted to technology.
16	8	"The Wilson-Speer Family"	Surprise, Arizona	March 13, 2013	N/A
Sean Speer and Shari Wilson have five children: 16-year-old Kaylie, 13-year-old Kira, 11-year-olds Kami-K and Karlee and 6-year-old Teagen. Kaylie, Kira, and Kami-K are from Shari’s first marriage. Karolee is from Sean’s first marriage. Teagen is Sean and Shari's child together. Shari has not given any of her daughters discipline, rules or boundaries which has caused them to become out-of-control Kaylie is spoiled, Kira and Kami-K are reckless, and they terrorize Karlee. Teagan whines to get his way and sleeps with his parents. Whenever Sean tries to discipline Shari's daughters she will give Sean a hard time, to add insult to injury Shari had an affair and it has driven a wedge between the entire family.
