= How Not to Decorate =

British television series

How Not to Decorate is a television series which aired from 1 August 2004 to 27 April 2006 on Five in the United Kingdom. Designers Colin McAllister and Justin Ryan helped redecorate notoriously ugly or unstylish homes, in a format similar to the What Not to Wear series. The series centred heavily around McAllister and Ryan's trademark banter and fussiness.

== International Broadcasts ==
In Australia, How Not to Decorate airs on the Seven Network's free-to-air digital channel 7Two at 22:30 Friday nights.

How Not to Decorate has also aired in South Africa, New Zealand, Estonia, Canada, Poland and Albania, and in Spain it is called Los asaltacasa and broadcast on TV Divinity Chanel.
