= No Going Back (TV series) =

British reality television series

No Going Back is a reality television programme that was broadcast on Channel 4 in 2002 in the United Kingdom. It follows the attempts of Britons, usually couples, as they try to renovate or build homes abroad.

== Jayne Gaskin episode ==
In 2001, former Playboy bunny Jayne Gaskin purchased a private island on the Mosquito Coast of Nicaragua and moved with her family from Hampshire, England. Gaskin decides to build a resort on the island. Environmentalists starting protesting and eventually a gang holds them at gunpoint before her husband Phil uses a gasoline can as self defense. Phil eventually dies of a respiratory illness and Gaskin decides to sell the island.
