= Ellen DeGeneres: For Your Approval =

2024 comedy special by Ellen DeGeneres

- Written by: Ellen DeGeneres
- Directed by: Joel Gallen
- Starring: Ellen DeGeneres
- Music by: Harry Styles; Lior Rosner; Sharlotte Gibson; Jill Scott
- Country of origin: United States
- Original language: English

Production
- Producers: Ben Winston; Ellen DeGeneres; Portia de Rossi; Dave Piendak; Emily Wolfe; Marnie Sirota; Caryn Weingarten; Ian Karmel
- Cinematography: Dylan Sanford
- Editor: Bill DeRonde
- Running time: 70 minutes
- Production companies: A Very Good Production; Fulwell 73; Netflix Studios

Original release
- Network: Netflix
- Release: September 24, 2024

Ellen DeGeneres: For Your Approval is a 2024 American stand-up comedy special by comedian and television host Ellen DeGeneres. It was recorded at the Orpheum Theatre in Minneapolis, Minnesota in August 2024 and premiered on September 24, 2024, on Netflix. For Your Approval was her first stand-up special since 2018's Ellen DeGeneres: Relatable, also produced by Netflix. DeGeneres has stated that the special will be her final outing as a comedian.

== Synopsis ==
In a cold open, DeGeneres walks through the back rooms of the Orpheum Theatre interspersed with video and audio clips of her career in chronological order, with significant coverage of her 2020 bullying accusations. Much of the stand-up is dedicated to her professional life since the 2020 allegations and 2022 end of The Ellen DeGeneres Show, joking that she no longer receives botox treatment and that she had been "kicked out of show business." The song "Golden" by Jill Scott plays over the closing credits.

== Reception ==
For Your Approval received mixed-to-negative from critics. On the review aggregator Rotten Tomatoes, it has an approval rating of 33%.

Judy Berman in Time and Adam White in The Independent both described the special as "unfunny." Most critical reviews criticized the special as being a venue for DeGeneres to respond to criticism. June Thomas for Slate wrote that the special was meant to "fan the flames of her own ego" and Fran Hoepfner in The Atlantic described it as "a request for grace that she doesn't quite earn."

Writing for The Boston Globe, Mark Feeney gave the special a positive review, calling it "enjoyable viewing."
