= List of awards and nominations received by Ellen DeGeneres =

Ellen DeGeneres awards and nominations
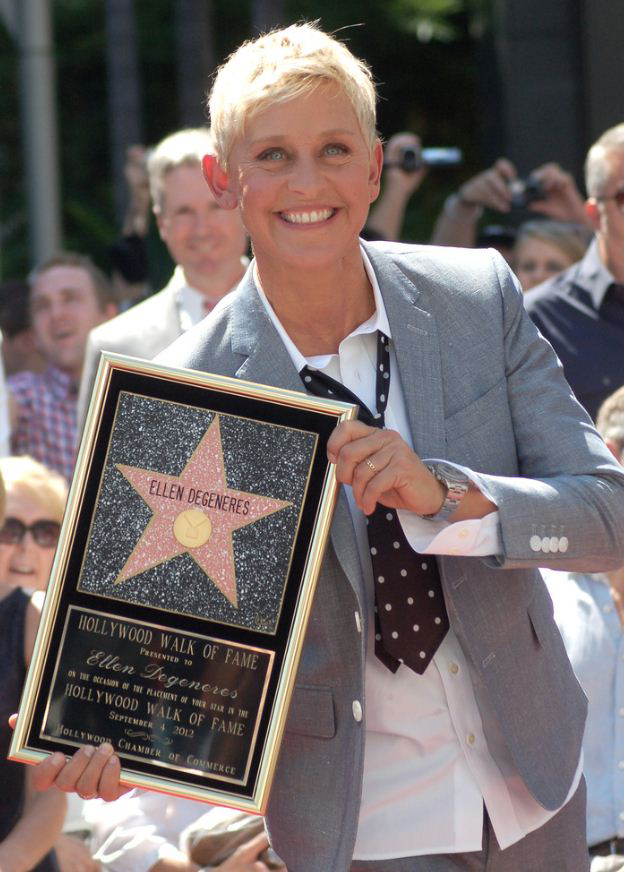
- DeGeneres receiving a star on the Hollywood Walk of Fame in 2012
Awards and nominations
Award	Wins	Nominations
Actor Awards	0	3
Emmys (Daytime)	33	57
Emmys (Primetime)	1	15
Golden Globes	0	3
Grammy Awards	0	3

Totals (Note: Certain award groups do not simply award one winner. They acknowledge several different recipients, have runners-up, and have third place. Since this is a specific recognition and is different from losing an award, runner-up mentions are considered wins in this award tally. For simplification and to avoid errors, each award in this list has been presumed to have had a prior nomination.)
- Wins: 34
- Nominations: 172

The following is a list of awards and nominations received by Ellen DeGeneres.

Ellen DeGeneres is an American comedian, television host, actress, writer, and producer. She has received numerous accolades including 33 Daytime Emmy Awards, a Primetime Emmy Award, and 20 People's Choice Awards and received nominations for three Actor Awards, and three Grammy Awards, and three Golden Globe Awards. She has also been honored with a star on the Hollywood Walk of Fame in 2012, the Mark Twain Prize for American Humor also in 2012, the Presidential Medal of Freedom in 2016, and the Carol Burnett Award in 2020.

DeGeneres started her career as a standup comedian before starring in her own ABC sitcom Ellen (1994–1998) where she won the Primetime Emmy Award for Outstanding Writing for a Comedy Series for the "The Puppy Episode" (1997). For her performance as Ellen Morgan in the sitcom she was nominated for four Primetime Emmy Awards for Outstanding Lead Actress in a Comedy Series, three Golden Globe Awards for Best Actress – Television Series Musical or Comedy, and three Actor Awards for Outstanding Actress in a Comedy Series.

She expanded her career as a daytime-talk show host with the series The Ellen DeGeneres Show (2003–2022), where she gained mainstream popularity and numerous accolades including 33 Daytime Emmy Awards, including four wins for Outstanding Daytime Talk Series, eight for Outstanding Talk Show Entertainment, and four wins for Outstanding Daytime Talk Series Host. She has also earned 20 People's Choice Awards including twelve for Favorite Daytime Talk Show Host and four for Favorite Funny Female Star. For the show, she also won seven Teen Choice Awards, a Nickelodeon Kids' Choice Award, a GLAAD Media Awards, a MTV Movie & TV Award, and two Producers Guild of America Awards.

As a standup, she has hosted numerous award shows including the Academy Awards, the Grammy Awards, and the Primetime Emmy Awards. She was nominated the Primetime Emmy Award for Outstanding Individual Performance in a Variety or Music Program for 38th Annual Grammy Awards (1996) and the 79th Academy Awards (2007). For her standup specials, she was nominated for the Primetime Emmy Award for Outstanding Variety Special (Pre-Recorded) for Ellen DeGeneres: The Beginning (2001) and Ellen DeGeneres: Here and Now (2003). She was nominated for the Grammy Award for Best Comedy Album for her specials The Funny Thing Is... (2005) and Ellen DeGeneres: Relatable (2020). She released her memoir, Seriously…I'm Kidding (2013) for which she was nominated for the Grammy Award for Best Spoken Word Album.

As an actress, she was nominated for the Primetime Emmy Award for Outstanding Guest Actress in a Comedy Series for The Larry Sanders Show (1997). She gained attention for her portrayal of Dory, a friendly fish with short term memory loss in the Disney-Pixar animated films Finding Nemo (2003) and it's sequel Finding Dory (2016), the first of which earned her the Annie Award for Outstanding Achievement for Voice Acting in a Feature Production, the Kids' Choice Award for Favorite Voice From an Animated Movie, and the Saturn Award for Best Supporting Actress.

== Major associations ==
=== Actor Awards ===
Year	Category	Nominated work	Result	Ref.
1994	Outstanding Actress in a Comedy Series	Ellen	Nominated	
1996	Outstanding Actress in a Comedy Series	Ellen	Nominated	
1997	Outstanding Actress in a Comedy Series	Ellen	Nominated	

=== Critics' Choice Award ===
Year	Category	Nominated work	Result	Ref.
Critics' Choice Television Award
2011	Critics' Choice Television Award for Best Talk Show	The Ellen DeGeneres Show	Nominated	
2013	Critics' Choice Television Award for Best Talk Show	The Ellen DeGeneres Show	Nominated	
2014	Critics' Choice Television Award for Best Talk Show	The Ellen DeGeneres Show	Nominated	
2018	Critics' Choice Television Award for Best Talk Show	The Ellen DeGeneres Show	Nominated	
2019	Critics' Choice Television Award for Best Talk Show	The Ellen DeGeneres Show	Nominated	

=== Emmy Awards ===
Year	Category	Nominated work	Result	Ref.
Daytime Emmy Awards
2004	Outstanding Talk Show	The Ellen DeGeneres Show	Won	
2004	Outstanding Talk Show Host	The Ellen DeGeneres Show	Nominated	
2004	Outstanding Special Class Writing	The Ellen DeGeneres Show	Nominated	
2005	Outstanding Talk Show	The Ellen DeGeneres Show	Won	
2005	Outstanding Talk Show Host	The Ellen DeGeneres Show	Won	
2005	Outstanding Special Class Writing	The Ellen DeGeneres Show	Won	
2006	Outstanding Talk Show	The Ellen DeGeneres Show	Won	
2006	Outstanding Talk Show Host	The Ellen DeGeneres Show	Won	
2006	Outstanding Special Class Writing	The Ellen DeGeneres Show	Won	
2007	Outstanding Talk Show	The Ellen DeGeneres Show	Won	
2007	Outstanding Talk Show Host	The Ellen DeGeneres Show	Won	
2007	Outstanding Special Class Writing	The Ellen DeGeneres Show	Won	
2008	Outstanding Talk Show Entertainment	The Ellen DeGeneres Show	Nominated	
2008	Outstanding Talk Show Host	The Ellen DeGeneres Show	Won	
2008	Outstanding Special Class Writing	The Ellen DeGeneres Show	Nominated	
2009	Outstanding Talk Show Entertainment	The Ellen DeGeneres Show	Nominated	
2009	Outstanding Talk Show Host	The Ellen DeGeneres Show	Nominated	
2009	Outstanding Special Class Writing	The Ellen DeGeneres Show	Nominated	
2009	Outstanding Promotional Announcement – Institutional	The Ellen DeGeneres Show	Won	
2010	Outstanding Talk Show Entertainment	The Ellen DeGeneres Show	Won	
2010	Outstanding New Approaches – Daytime Entertainment	The Ellen DeGeneres Show	Nominated	
2010	Outstanding Special Class Writing	The Ellen DeGeneres Show	Nominated	
2011	Outstanding Talk Show Entertainment	The Ellen DeGeneres Show	Won	
2011	Outstanding Promotional Announcement – Institutional	The Ellen DeGeneres Show	Won	
2011	Outstanding Special Class Writing	The Ellen DeGeneres Show	Won	
2011	Outstanding New Approaches – Daytime Entertainment	The Ellen DeGeneres Show	Nominated	
2012	Outstanding Talk Show Entertainment	The Ellen DeGeneres Show	Nominated	
2012	Outstanding New Approaches – Daytime Entertainment	The Ellen DeGeneres Show	Nominated	
2012	Outstanding Promotional Announcement – Institutional	The Ellen DeGeneres Show	Nominated	
2012	Outstanding Promotional Announcement – Institutional	The Ellen DeGeneres Show	Won	
2012	Outstanding Special Class Writing	The Ellen DeGeneres Show	Won	
2013	Outstanding Talk Show Entertainment	The Ellen DeGeneres Show	Won	
2013	Outstanding Special Class Writing	The Ellen DeGeneres Show	Won	
2013	Outstanding New Approaches – Enhancement to a Daytime Program or Series	The Ellen DeGeneres Show	Won	
2014	Outstanding Talk Show Entertainment	The Ellen DeGeneres Show	Won	
2014	Outstanding Special Class Writing	The Ellen DeGeneres Show	Won	
2014	Outstanding New Approaches – Enhancement to a Daytime Program or Series	The Ellen DeGeneres Show	Won	
2015	Outstanding Talk Show Entertainment	The Ellen DeGeneres Show	Won	
2015	Outstanding Special Class Writing	The Ellen DeGeneres Show	Nominated	
2015	Outstanding New Approaches – Enhancement to a Daytime Program or Series	The Ellen DeGeneres Show	Won	
2015	Outstanding Promotional Announcement – Episodic	The Ellen DeGeneres Show	Nominated	
2015	Outstanding Promotional Announcement – Episodic	The Ellen DeGeneres Show	Nominated	
2016	Outstanding Talk Show Entertainment	The Ellen DeGeneres Show	Nominated	
2016	Outstanding Interactive Media – Enhancement to a Daytime Program or Series	The Ellen DeGeneres Show	Won	
2016	Outstanding Promotional Announcement – Image	The Ellen DeGeneres Show	Won	
2017	Outstanding Talk Show Entertainment	The Ellen DeGeneres Show	Won	
2017	Outstanding Special Class Writing	The Ellen DeGeneres Show	Nominated	
2018	Outstanding Talk Show Entertainment	The Ellen DeGeneres Show	Nominated	
2018	Outstanding Special Class Writing	The Ellen DeGeneres Show	Nominated	
2018	Outstanding Daytime Promotional Announcement – Topical	The Ellen DeGeneres Show	Nominated	
2019	Outstanding Talk Show Entertainment	The Ellen DeGeneres Show	Won	
2019	Outstanding Special Class Writing	The Ellen DeGeneres Show	Won	
2019	Outstanding Daytime Promotional Announcement – Topical	The Ellen DeGeneres Show	Nominated	
2020	Outstanding Talk Show Entertainment	The Ellen DeGeneres Show	Won	
2020	Outstanding Special Class Writing	The Ellen DeGeneres Show	Nominated	
2021	Outstanding Talk Show Entertainment	The Ellen DeGeneres Show	Nominated	
2022	Outstanding Writing Team For A Daytime Non-Fictional Program	The Ellen DeGeneres Show	Won	
Primetime Emmy Awards
1995	Outstanding Lead Actress in a Comedy Series	Ellen	Nominated	
1996	Outstanding Lead Actress in a Comedy Series	Ellen	Nominated	
1996	Outstanding Individual Performance in a Variety or Music Program	38th Annual Grammy Awards	Nominated	
1997	Outstanding Lead Actress in a Comedy Series	Ellen	Nominated	
1997	Outstanding Guest Actress in a Comedy Series	The Larry Sanders Show	Nominated	
1997	Outstanding Writing for a Comedy Series	Ellen for "The Puppy Episode"	Won	
1998	Outstanding Lead Actress in a Comedy Series	Ellen	Nominated	
2000	Outstanding Television Movie	If These Walls Could Talk 2	Nominated	
2001	Outstanding Variety, Music, or Comedy Special	Ellen DeGeneres: The Beginning	Nominated	
2001	Outstanding Individual Performance in a Variety or Music Program	Ellen DeGeneres: The Beginning	Nominated	
2004	Outstanding Variety, Music, or Comedy Special	Ellen DeGeneres: Here and Now	Nominated	
2004	Outstanding Individual Performance in a Variety or Music Program	Ellen DeGeneres: Here and Now	Nominated	
2007	Outstanding Individual Performance in a Variety or Music Program	79th Academy Awards	Nominated	
2014	Outstanding Special Class Program	86th Academy Awards	Nominated	
2018	Outstanding Host for a Reality or Reality-Competition Program	Ellen's Game of Games	Nominated	
2019	Outstanding Host for a Reality or Competition Program	Ellen's Game of Games	Nominated	

=== Golden Globe Awards ===
Year	Category	Nominated work	Result	Ref.
1994	Best Actress – Television Series Musical or Comedy	Ellen	Nominated	
1995	Best Actress – Television Series Musical or Comedy	Ellen	Nominated	
1997	Best Actress – Television Series Musical or Comedy	Ellen	Nominated	
2020	Carol Burnett Award	—N/a	Honored	

=== Grammy Awards ===
Year	Category	Nominated work	Result	Ref.
2005	Best Comedy Album	The Funny Thing Is...	Nominated	
2013	Best Spoken Word Album	Seriously…I'm Kidding	Nominated	
2020	Best Comedy Album	Ellen DeGeneres: Relatable	Nominated	

=== People's Choice Awards ===
Year	Category	Nominated work	Result	Ref.
1995	Favorite Female Performer in a New TV Series	Ellen	Won	
2005	Favorite Daytime Talk Show Host	The Ellen DeGeneres Show	Won	
2005	Favorite Funny Female Star	The Ellen DeGeneres Show	Won	
2006	Favorite Daytime Talk Show Host	The Ellen DeGeneres Show	Won	
2006	Favorite Funny Female Star	The Ellen DeGeneres Show	Won	
2007	Favorite Talk Show Host	The Ellen DeGeneres Show	Won	
2007	Favorite Funny Female Star	The Ellen DeGeneres Show	Won	
2008	Favorite Talk Show Host	The Ellen DeGeneres Show	Won	
2008	Favorite Funny Female Star	The Ellen DeGeneres Show	Won	
2009	Favorite Talk Show Host	The Ellen DeGeneres Show	Won	
2009	Favorite Funny Female Star	The Ellen DeGeneres Show	Nominated	
2011	Favorite Talk Show Host	The Ellen DeGeneres Show	Won	
2012	Favorite Daytime TV Host	The Ellen DeGeneres Show	Won	
2013	Favorite Daytime TV Host	The Ellen DeGeneres Show	Won	
2014	Favorite Daytime TV Host(s)	The Ellen DeGeneres Show	Won	
2015	Favorite Daytime TV Host(s)	The Ellen DeGeneres Show	Won	
2016	Favorite Daytime TV Host	The Ellen DeGeneres Show	Won	
2016	Favorite Humanitarian		Won	
2017	Favorite Animated Movie Voice	Finding Dory	Won	
2017	Favorite Daytime TV Host	The Ellen DeGeneres Show	Won	
2017	Favorite Comedic Collaboration	"Ellen and Britney Spears' Mall Mischief"	Won	
2018	The Daytime Talk Show of 2018	The Ellen DeGeneres Show	Won	
2018	The Social Celebrity of 2018		Nominated	
2019	The Daytime Talk Show of 2019	The Ellen DeGeneres Show	Won	
2019	The Social Celebrity of 2019		Won	

=== Teen Choice Awards ===
Year	Category	Nominated work	Result	Ref.
2010	Choice Comedian	The Ellen DeGeneres Show	Won	
2011	Choice Comedian	The Ellen DeGeneres Show	Won	
2012	Choice Comedian	The Ellen DeGeneres Show	Won	
2013	Choice Comedian	The Ellen DeGeneres Show	Won	
2015	Choice Comedian	The Ellen DeGeneres Show	Won	
2016	Choice Summer Movie Star: Female	Finding Dory	Won	
2016	Choice Comedian	The Ellen DeGeneres Show	Won	
2017	Choice TV Personality	The Ellen DeGeneres Show	Won	
2017	Choice Comedy Movie Actress	Finding Dory	Won	
2018	Choice Comedian	The Ellen DeGeneres Show	Nominated	
2019	Choice Comedian	The Ellen DeGeneres Show	Nominated	

== Miscellaneous awards ==
Organizations	Year	Category	Work	Result	Ref.
American Comedy Award	1991	Funniest Female Stand-Up Comic	Herself	Won	
American Comedy Award	1995	Funniest Female Performer in a TV Special (Leading or Supporting)	46th Primetime Emmy Awards	Won	
American Comedy Award	1996	Funniest Female Performer in a TV Series (Leading Role)	Ellen	Nominated	
American Comedy Award	1995	Funniest Female Performer in a TV Series (Leading Role)	Ellen	Nominated	
American Comedy Award	1995	Funniest Female Guest Appearance in a TV Series	The Larry Sanders Show	Nominated	
American Comedy Award	1995	Funniest Female Performer in a TV Special (Leading or Supporting)	1998 VH1 Fashion Awards	Won	
American Comedy Award	2001	Funniest Female Performer in a TV Special (Leading or Supporting)	Ellen DeGeneres: The Beginning	Won	
Annie Award	2004	Voice Acting in a Feature Production	Finding Nemo	Won	
CableACE Award	1993	Best Stand-Up Comedy Special	One Night Stand	Nominated	
CableACE Award	1995	Best Entertainment Host	VH1 Honors	Nominated	
Chicago Film Critics Association	2003	Best Supporting Actress	Finding Nemo	Nominated	
GLAAD Media Awards	2001	Outstanding TV Movie	If These Walls Could Talk 2	Won	
GLAAD Media Awards	2002	Outstanding Comedy Series	The Ellen Show	Nominated	
GLAAD Media Awards	2009	Outstanding Talk Show Episode	The Ellen DeGeneres Show	Won	
GLAAD Media Awards	2010	Outstanding Talk Show Episode	The Ellen DeGeneres Show	Nominated	
GLAAD Media Awards	2011	Outstanding Talk Show Episode	The Ellen DeGeneres Show	Nominated	
GLAAD Media Awards	2012	Outstanding Talk Show Episode	The Ellen DeGeneres Show	Nominated	
GLAAD Media Awards	2013	Outstanding Talk Show Episode	The Ellen DeGeneres Show	Nominated	
GLAAD Media Awards	2014	Outstanding Talk Show Episode	The Ellen DeGeneres Show	Nominated	
GLAAD Media Awards	2015	Outstanding Talk Show Episode	The Ellen DeGeneres Show	Nominated	
GLAAD Media Awards	2016	Outstanding Talk Show Episode	The Ellen DeGeneres Show	Nominated	
GLAAD Media Awards	2017	Outstanding Talk Show Episode	The Ellen DeGeneres Show	Nominated	
GLAAD Media Awards	2018	Outstanding Talk Show Episode	The Ellen DeGeneres Show	Nominated	
GLAAD Media Awards	2019	Outstanding Variety or Talk Show Episode	The Ellen DeGeneres Show	Nominated	
GLAAD Media Awards	2020	Outstanding Variety or Talk Show Episode	The Ellen DeGeneres Show	Nominated	
Kids' Choice Awards	2004	Favorite Voice From an Animated Movie	Finding Nemo	Won	
Kids' Choice Awards	2017	Favorite Voice From an Animated Movie	Finding Dory	Won	
Kids' Choice Awards	2017	Most Wanted Pet	Finding Dory	Nominated	
Kids' Choice Awards	2017	#Squad (shared with cast)	Finding Dory	Won	
Kids' Choice Awards	2019	Favorite TV Show Host	The Ellen DeGeneres Show	Won	
MTV Movie Award	2004	Best Comedic Performance	Finding Nemo	Nominated	
MTV Movie Award	2017	Best Host	The Ellen DeGeneres Show	Nominated	
Producers Guild of America	2001	Outstanding Producer of Long-Form Television	If These Walls Could Talk 2	Nominated	
Producers Guild of America	2005	Outstanding Producer of Variety Television	The Ellen DeGeneres Show	Won	
Producers Guild of America	2006	Outstanding Producer of Variety Television	The Ellen DeGeneres Show	Won	
Producers Guild of America	2007	Outstanding Producer of Variety Television	The Ellen DeGeneres Show	Nominated	
Producers Guild of America	2012	Outstanding Producer of Live Entertainment & Talk Television	The Ellen DeGeneres Show	Nominated	
Satellite Award	1997	Best Actress – Television Series Musical or Comedy	Ellen	Nominated	
Satellite Award	1998	Best Actress – Television Series Musical or Comedy	Ellen	Won	
Saturn Award	2003	Best Supporting Actress	Finding Nemo	Won	
TV Guide Award	2011	Favorite Host	Ellen	Won	
TV Land Award	2007	TV Moment That Became Headline News	Ellen	Nominated	
Viewers for Quality Television	1997	Best Actress in a Quality Comedy Series	Ellen	Nominated	
Viewers for Quality Television	1998	Best Actress in a Quality Comedy Series	Ellen	Nominated	
Writers Guild of America	1998	Television: Episodic Comedy	Ellen for "The Puppy Episode"	Nominated	

== Honorary awards ==
Organizations	Year	Award	Result	Ref.
GLAAD	1998	Stephen F. Kolzak Award	Honored	
Women in Film and Television International	2000	Lucy Award	Honored	
Tulane University	2009	President's Medal	Honored	
John F. Kennedy Center for the Performing Arts	2012	Mark Twain Prize for American Humor	Honored	
Hollywood Walk of Fame	2012	Television Star	Honored	
President Barack Obama	2016	Presidential Medal of Freedom	Honored	
Hollywood Foreign Press Association	2020	Carol Burnett Award	Honored	
