= Repeat After Me (TV series) =

- Genre: Comedy reality
- Presented by: Wendi McLendon-Covey
- Country of origin: United States
- Original language: English
- No. of seasons: 1
- No. of episodes: 8

Production
- Executive producers: Ellen DeGeneres; Mary Connelly; Ed Glavin; Andy Lassner; Kevin A. Leman II; Jason Goldberg; James Breen; Jeff Kleeman
- Camera setup: Multiple
- Running time: 22 minutes
- Production companies: A Very Good Production; Katalyst Media; Warner Horizon Television

Original release
- Network: ABC
- Release: February 17 – April 21, 2015

Repeat After Me is an American hidden camera television series on ABC based on one of the segments from The Ellen DeGeneres Show. The series premiered on February 17, 2015. The series is executive produced by talk show host Ellen DeGeneres.

== Format ==
The series features host Wendi McLendon-Covey guiding celebrities via a remote ear piece to interact with everyday people who do not know they are being filmed. Each episode features different celebrities. The most memorable moment of the night is crowned in front of a live studio audience at the end of each episode.

== Episodes ==
No.	Title	Original release date	U.S. viewers (millions)
1	"Episode 101"	February 17, 2015	4.36
Celebrities featured: Scott Foley, Sarah Hyland and Randy Jackson
2	"Episode 102"	February 24, 2015	3.85
Celebrities featured: Justin Bieber, Kristen Bell and Michael Bolton
3	"Episode 103"	March 3, 2015	4.06
Celebrities featured: Usher, Chris Harrison and Beth Behrs
4	"Episode 104"	March 10, 2015	3.46
Celebrities featured: Tim McGraw, Olivia Munn and Wanda Sykes
5	"Episode 105"	March 24, 2015	3.53
Celebrities featured: Leah Remini, Randall Park and Bellamy Young
6	"Episode 106"	March 31, 2015	3.32
Celebrities featured: Jeff Garlin and Brad Paisley
7	"Episode 107"	April 14, 2015	3.09
Celebrities featured: Josh Groban, Jimmie Johnson, Lauren Graham and Mario Lopez
8	"Episode 108"	April 21, 2015	3.56
Celebrities featured: Ellen Pompeo, Taye Diggs and Harry Connick Jr.

== International versions ==
Country/language	Local title	Host	Channel	Date aired/premiered
Arab World	Repeat After Me	Tarek Alharby	Abu Dhabi TV	February 19, 2020
