= Top-rated United States television programs of 2016–17 =

This table displays the top-rated primetime television series of the 2016–17 season, as measured by Nielsen Media Research.

Rank	Program	Network	Rating
1	The Big Bang Theory	CBS	11.5
2	NCIS	CBS	11.4
3	Sunday Night Football	NBC	11.1
4	Thursday Night Football	CBS/NBC	9.6
4	Bull	CBS	9.6
6	This Is Us	NBC	9.4
7	Blue Bloods	CBS	8.9
8	NCIS: New Orleans	CBS	8.5
9	Dancing with the Stars	ABC	8.1
10	NCIS: Los Angeles	CBS	7.8
11	60 Minutes	CBS	7.7
12	Hawaii Five-0	CBS	7.6
12	The Voice	NBC	7.6
14	Designated Survivor	ABC	7.5
15	The Voice: Tuesday	NBC	7.4
16	Grey's Anatomy	ABC	7.3
17	Criminal Minds	CBS	6.9
17	Madam Secretary	CBS	6.9
19	Empire	FOX	6.7
19	Scorpion	CBS	6.7
21	Chicago Fire	NBC	6.5
22	Chicago Med	NBC	6.2
22	Survivor	CBS	6.2
24	Little Big Shots	NBC	6.1
24	MacGyver	CBS	6.1
26	Code Black	CBS	6.0
27	The Blacklist	NBC	5.9
27	Mom	CBS	5.9
29	The Bachelor	ABC	5.8
30	Scandal	ABC	5.7
