= Family Game Fight! =

American game show

- Genre: Game show
- Created by: Ellen DeGeneres; Kristen Bell; Dax Shepard
- Based on: The Ellen DeGeneres Show and Ellen's Game of Games
- Written by: Edward Thomas
- Directed by: Rich Kim
- Presented by: Kristen Bell; Dax Shepard
- Country of origin: United States
- Original language: English
- No. of seasons: 1
- No. of episodes: 10

Production
- Executive producers: Ellen DeGeneres; Mary Connelly; Andy Lassner; Derek Westervelt; Noah Bonnett; Dan Norris; Joel Van Rysselberghe; Jeff Kleeman; Mike Darnell; Brooke Karzen; Kristen Bell; Dax Shepard
- Running time: 45 mins (excluding ads) (25 mins, preview episode)
- Production companies: A Very Good Production; Dingus Von Pringus; Telepictures; Warner Horizon Unscripted Television

Original release
- Network: NBC
- Release: August 8, 2021 – August 7, 2022

Related
- The Ellen DeGeneres Show; Ellen's Game of Games

Family Game Fight! is an American game show where families compete in challenges to win $100,000 in prize money. The show is hosted by Kristen Bell and Dax Shepard, marking their first television project together. The series aired on NBC from August 8, 2021 to August 7, 2022.

The show is partially based on The Ellen DeGeneres Show and Ellen's Game of Games and is executively produced by Ellen DeGeneres with her group (including Bell and Shepard).

== Format ==
In each episode, two families consisting of four members are joined by Bell and Shepard to take on in a different set of silly games, both physical and mental. Both families compete in a series of games, with the winning family given a chance to win $100,000.

The families competing usually have these relations: Brothers and Sisters, Moms and Best Mates, as well as regular families including Parents, Grandparents and Kids.

=== Preliminary games ===
- Air Heads: Four team members are given a secret word by the opposing team, and each one submits a clue to their fifth teammate, the guesser. If two players give the same clue, they are blasted with air to the face (hence the name "Air Heads"), and their mutual clue is discarded. The guesser must identify the secret word based on the remaining clues. The team that correctly guesses the most words wins.
- Between the Sheets: In this game, hosts Shepard and Bell are in a bed, where they wear blindfolds and guess the objects hidden under the sheets while describing them to each other. Meanwhile, the families have to place a bet on how many items their host would get right. The family with most correct guesses wins the game.
- Brain Freeze: In this game, one team member is placed in a freezer, wearing headphones to not hear anything. The rest of their family, along with either Bell or Shepard, have to list things relating to a given category. The member in the freezer then has to guess the answers given by their team. A wrong answer leads to a river of ice flowing onto the members' backs. Three wrong answers ends the team's turn. The team with the most correct guesses wins.
- Deep Dish Dash:
- Fruit Flies:
- Helium Hoops: Two team members have to carry a helium balloon, wedged between them, through an obstacle course without using their hands. At the same time, the opposing team throws balls at them. At the end of the course, they have to release their balloon so it goes through a hoop suspended above them. After the other team puts balloons in, the team who put the most balloons through the hoop wins.
- Nosy Neighbors: In this game, one player from each team will jump on a trampoline and give clues to Shepard and Bell about a collage of celebrities on the other side of the fence.
- Pie Rollers: In this game, hosts Shepard and Bell play alongside one player from each of their team, where they have to challenge the opposing team to guess a word using only a fixed number of describing words (similar to 25 Words or Less). For each wrong answer, the team member guessing will get hit with a pie on the face.
- Sound Bites: One team member plays with either Bell or Shepard. The players alternate grabbing an item and making a sound effect hinting towards the answer. The team with the most correct answers wins.
- Taste Buds: This game is based on Ellen DeGeneres' creations, where contestants have to guess a food or item and explain it to the other members with blindfolds on. This version is just with families in addition; the family with the most correct answers wins the game.

=== Final game: Spin Cycle ===
The winning family sits on the rotating podium and has 60 seconds to name as many as 10 objects as described by Shepard and Bell in alternation, either by using words, acting, or drawing them. Each correct answer awarded $10,000 but the rotating podium increases its speed. The game ends once the family identifies all 10 objects or runs out of time. Throughout the show's run, only six teams won the top prize.

== Production ==
In February 2019, when Bell and Shepard visited on The Ellen DeGeneres Show, they were forced to play one on Ellen's favorite game called Taste Buds, noting, "It was so much better than it could've been ever hoped". Afterwards, DeGeneres with her production group came up with an idea of a game show starring Bell and Shepard. Later, the name revealed to be Family Game Fight!, with DeGeneres as leading executive producer.

The show was originally scheduled to premiere on August 11, 2021. On July 11, NBC announced that a preview of the series would air following its primetime broadcast of the 2020 Summer Olympics closing ceremony, replacing Ultimate Slip 'N Slide (whose production had been suspended).

In May 2022, NBC shelved the series indefinitely.

== Episodes ==
No.	Title	Original release date	Prod. code	U.S. viewers (millions)
1	"The Jex Family vs. The Bruin Bros."	August 8, 2021	101	3.39
Preliminary Games: Between the Sheets / Brain Freeze / Pie Rollers; Winning Family & Host: The Jex Family (Dax Shepard); Family's Winnings: $90,000; Note: This episode is a 30-minute-long Special, the following episodes are longer.
2	"The Pope Family vs. The Military Moms"	August 11, 2021	102	2.61
Preliminary Games: Pie Rollers / Sound Bites / Taste Buds / Air Heads / Brain Freeze; Winning Family & Host: The Pope Family (Kristen Bell); Family's Winnings: $100,000; Note: From this episode onwards, at the middle of each episode, the hosts change their competing families.
3	"The Strutner Family vs. The Caropino Family"	August 18, 2021	103	2.24
Preliminary Games: Pie Rollers / Nosy Neighbors / Taste Buds / Deep Dish Dash / Brain Freeze; Winning Family & Host: The Caropino Family (Kristen Bell); Family's Winnings: $100,000
4	"The Life Savers vs. The A+ Team"	August 25, 2021	104	2.09
Preliminary Games: Helium Hoops / Air Heads / Between the Sheets / Pie Rollers / Nosy Neighbors; Winning Family & Host: The Life Savers (Kristen Bell); Family's Winnings: $60,000
5	"The Banayan Family vs. The Williams Family"	September 1, 2021	105	2.18
Preliminary Games: Helium Hoops / Sound Bites / Taste Buds / Air Heads / Nosy Neighbors; Winning Family & Host: The Banayan Family (Kristen Bell); Family's Winnings: $100,000
6	"The Collins Family vs. The Bailey Family"	September 8, 2021	106	2.16
Preliminary Games: Helium Hoops / Pie Rollers / Taste Buds / Between the Sheets / Brain Freeze / Nosy Neighbors; Winning Family & Host: The Bailey Family (Dax Shepard); Family's Winnings: $40,000
7	"The Sanchez Family vs. The Chow Family"	September 14, 2021	107	2.33
Preliminary Games: Pie Rollers / Sound Bites / Between the Sheets / Air Heads / Brain Freeze; Winning Family & Host: The Chow Family (Dax Shepard); Family's Winnings: $90,000
8	"The Alongi Family vs. The Lam Family"	September 15, 2021	108	2.38
Preliminary Games: Pie Rollers / Fruit Flies / Taste Buds / Deep Dish Dash / Brain Freeze; Winning Family & Host: The Lam Family (Dax Shepard); Family's Winnings: $100,000
9	"The Harris Family vs. The Driver Family"	August 2, 2022	109	1.98
Preliminary Games: Fruit Flies / Sound Bites / Between the Sheets / Air Heads / Helium Hoops; Winning Family & Host: The Harris Family (Kristen Bell); Family's Winnings: $100,000
10	"The Kosturos Family vs. The Extinguishers"	August 7, 2022	110	0.97
Preliminary Games: Helium Hoops / Nosy Neighbors / Between the Sheets / Air Heads / Sound Bites; Winning Family & Host: The Extinguishers (Kristen Bell); Family's Winnings: $100,000

== Reception ==
=== U.S. ratings ===
Viewership and ratings per episode of Family Game Fight!
No.	Title	Air date	Rating (18–49)	Viewers (millions)	DVR (18–49)	DVR viewers (millions)	Total (18–49)	Total viewers (millions)
1	"The Jex Family vs. The Bruin Bros."	August 8, 2021	0.7	3.39	0.1	0.28	0.8	3.67
2	"The Pope Family vs. The Military Moms"	August 11, 2021	0.5	2.61	0.1	0.42	0.6	3.03
3	"The Strutner Family vs. The Caropino Family"	August 18, 2021	0.4	2.22	0.1	0.33	0.5	2.55
4	"The Life Savers vs. The A+ Team"	August 25, 2021	0.4	2.09	—N/a	—N/a	—N/a	—N/a
5	"The Banayan Family vs. The Williams Family"	September 1, 2021	0.4	2.18	—N/a	—N/a	—N/a	—N/a
6	"The Collins Family vs. The Bailey Family"	September 8, 2021	0.4	2.16	—N/a	—N/a	—N/a	—N/a
7	"The Sanchez Family vs. The Chow Family"	September 14, 2021	0.5	2.33	—N/a	—N/a	—N/a	—N/a
8	"The Alongi Family vs. The Lam Family"	September 15, 2021	0.4	2.38	—N/a	—N/a	—N/a	—N/a
9	"The Harris Family vs. The Driver Family"	August 2, 2022	0.3	1.98	—N/a	—N/a	—N/a	—N/a
10	"The Kosturos Family vs. The Extinguishers"	August 7, 2022	0.2	0.97	—N/a	—N/a	—N/a	—N/a

=== Critical reception ===
Joel Keller of Decider wrote "What makes Family Game Fight fun isn't the families competing, and it's mostly not the game play, though the games the families play are goofy and fun to watch. No, what makes FGF an enjoyable show is its hosts".
