= A Very Good Production =

Former American film and television production company

- Type: Private
- Industry: Production company
- Founded: September 8, 2003; 23 years ago
- Founder: Ellen DeGeneres
- Defunct: September 24, 2024; 23 months ago
- Fate: Closed following DeGeneres' retirement
- Headquarters: United States
- Key people: Ellen DeGeneres (CEO); Jeff Kleeman (president)
- Owners: Ellen DeGeneres (50%); Telepictures (50%) (Backed by Warner Bros. Entertainment)
- Parent: Ellen Digital Ventures
- Subsidiaries: eleveneleven

A Very Good Production was an American film and television production company founded by comedian, television host, actress Ellen DeGeneres and Warner Bros. Television's Telepictures in 2003. It was known for producing the series The Ellen DeGeneres Show.

The company co-founded the former record label, eleveneleven in 2010.

The company was dissolved on September 24, 2024 as its founder Ellen DeGeneres retired from the show business, stand up comedian and actress after the release of Ellen DeGeneres: For Your Approval on Netflix following the allegations of on-set bullying before The Ellen DeGeneres Show ended in 2022.

== History ==
In October 2010, the company signed a multi-year deal with Warner Bros.

On March 17, 2021, it was announced that the company had signed a multi-year production deal with Discovery, Inc. to produce natural history content for the Discovery Channel and Discovery+.

== Filmography ==
=== Television ===
==== Former ====
- The Ellen DeGeneres Show (with Telepictures Productions, E. W. Scripps Company and WAD Productions) (2003–2022)
- Bethenny (with Telepictures Productions) (2012–2014)
- Repeat After Me (with Katalyst Media and Warner Horizon Television) (2015)
- One Big Happy (with Visualized, Inc. and Warner Bros. Television) (2015)
- Ellen's Design Challenge (with Telepictures Productions and A. Smith & Co.) (2015–2016)
- Heads Up! (with Telepictures Productions) (2016)
- Little Big Shots (with East 112th Street Productions (2016–2018), On the Day Productions (2020) and Warner Horizon Television) (2016–2020)
- Little Big Shots: Forever Young (with East 112th Street Productions and Warner Horizon Television) (2017)
- First Dates (with Twenty Twenty) (2017)
- Ellen's Game of Games (with Telepictures Productions, Bills Market and Television Productions and Warner Horizon Television) (2017–2021)
- Splitting Up Together (with Piece of Pie Productions and Warner Bros. Television) (2018–2019)
- Green Eggs and Ham (with Gulfstream Pictures, A Stern Talking To and Warner Bros. Animation) (2019–2022)
- The Masked Dancer (with Fox Alternative Entertainment, MBC, and Warner Horizon Unscripted & Alternative Television) (2020–2021)
- Little Ellen (with Warner Bros. Animation, as Ellen Digital Ventures) (2021–2022)
- Family Game Fight! (with Dingus Von Pringus, Telepictures Productions and Warner Horizon Television) (2021–2022)

=== Film ===
- The Smart One (with Warner Bros. Television) (2012; TV Movie)
- Sophia Grace & Rosie's Royal Adventure (2014)
- Nancy Drew and the Hidden Staircase (2019)

=== Specials ===
- Tig Notaro: Happy To Be Here (with Funny or Die and Zero Dollars And Zero Sense Productions) (2018)
- Ellen DeGeneres: Relatable (with Tenth Planet and Netflix Studios) (2018)
- Ellen DeGeneres: For Your Approval (with Fulwell 73 and Netflix Studios) (2024)
