= Top-rated United States television programs of 2015–16 =

This table displays the top-rated primetime television series of the 2015–16 season as measured by Nielsen Media Research.

Rank	Program	Network	Rating
1	NCIS	CBS	12.8
2	Sunday Night Football	NBC	12.6
3	The Big Bang Theory	CBS	12.5
4	Thursday Night Football	CBS	10.6
5	Empire	FOX	10.2
6	NCIS: New Orleans	CBS	9.4
7	Dancing with the Stars	ABC	8.8
8	Blue Bloods	CBS	8.4
9	The Voice: Monday	NBC	8.2
9	The X-Files	FOX	8.2
11	Grey's Anatomy	ABC	7.9
11	The Voice: Tuesday	NBC	7.9
13	Criminal Minds	CBS	7.8
13	Madam Secretary	CBS	7.8
15	60 Minutes	CBS	7.7
16	Scandal	ABC	7.6
16	Scorpion	CBS	7.6
18	The Blacklist	NBC	7.3
19	How to Get Away with Murder	ABC	7.2
19	Little Big Shots	NBC	7.2
21	Blindspot	NBC	7.1
21	The Good Wife	CBS	7.1
21	NCIS: Los Angeles	CBS	7.1
24	Chicago Fire	NBC	7.0
24	Hawaii Five-0	CBS	7.0
26	American Idol - Wednesday	FOX	6.9
27	American Idol - Thursday	FOX	6.7
28	Code Black	CBS	6.6
28	Survivor	CBS	6.6
30	Chicago Med	NBC	6.5
30	Life in Pieces	CBS	6.5
30	Shades of Blue	NBC	6.5
