= Little Ellen =

American animated children's television series

- Genre: Comedy
- Created by: Kevin A. Leman II; Jennifer Skelly
- Directed by: Sarah Johnson; Sean Petrilak; Ruolin Li; Erik Knutson; Cal Ramsey
- Voices of: Laurel Emory; Johanna Colon; JeCobi Swain; June Squibb
- Theme music composer: Jason Blackman and Jason Nesmith
- Composer: Dara Taylor
- Country of origin: United States
- Original language: English
- No. of seasons: 4 (2 unaired)
- No. of episodes: 40 (20 unaired)

Production
- Executive producers: Ellen DeGeneres; Kevin A. Leman II; Sam Register; Jennifer Skelly
- Producers: Jason Blackman; Elizabeth Seidman
- Running time: 11 minutes
- Production companies: Ellen Digital Ventures; Telepictures (uncredited); Warner Bros. Animation

Original release
- Network: HBO Max
- Release: September 13, 2021 – March 3, 2022

Little Ellen is an American animated television series produced by Ellen Digital Ventures and Warner Bros. Animation, with animation produced by Lighthouse Studios. This is the first Warner Bros. Animation produced series created for Warner Bros. Discovery's streaming service HBO Max under the Cartoonito brand and it is also the first preschoolers-focused series which is not from a popular franchise produced by Warner Bros. Animation since Firehouse Tales.

Little Ellen centers on a seven-year-old Ellen DeGeneres as she goes on adventures with cousin Becky and their music-focused friend Freckle. The second season was released on March 3, 2022. A completed third season was going to be premiered in June 2022, but was pulled from the schedule due to occurring delays; the series was eventually cancelled after its second season two months later for undisclosed reasons, leaving the third and fourth seasons unaired.

== Plot ==
The show explores the world through the eyes of Ellen DeGeneres as a child.

== Characters ==
- Ellen DeGeneres (voiced by Laurel Emory) is the main character of the series. She is a 7-year-old version of Ellen DeGeneres.
- Becky (voiced by Johanna Colon) is Ellen's cousin, who is passionate about fashion.
- Freckle (voiced by JeCobi Swain) is Ellen and Becky's friend. He is a boy who loves music.
- Gramsy (voiced by June Squibb) is Ellen and Becky's grandmother, who is very optimistic and wise.

== Episodes ==
=== Series overview ===
Season	Episodes	Originally released	
Season	Episodes	First released	Last released
1	10	September 13, 2021	October 14, 2021
2	10	March 3, 2022	

=== Season 1 (2021) ===
No. overall	No. in season	Title	Directed by	Written by	Original release date
1	1	"Best Laid Plans"	Sarah Johnson	Jason Blackman	September 13, 2021
Ellen, Becky and Freckle's plans for a perfect day end up going wrong when Gramsy misplaces the car keys.
2	2	"Cheer Up, Charlie Cat"	Sarah Johnson	Kevin A. Leman II	September 13, 2021
After Ellen tries to cheer up her cat, Charlie, she learns that even though she will not always be able to make her friends feel better, she can still be there when times get hard.
3	3	"Don't Rain on My Parade"	Sarah Johnson	Isabel Galupo	September 13, 2021
When a storm threatens to cancel Freckle's first parade, Ellen tries to convince the Storm King to stop raining.
4	4	"Little Helen"	Sean Petrilak	Kendall Michele Haney	September 13, 2021
Ellen worries that Becky and Freckle will have more fun with the next-door neighbour's granddaughter, Helen, than with herself.
5	5	"Oldie But a Goodie"	Ruolin Li	Jason Blackman	September 13, 2021
Ellen, Becky and Freckle decide to dress like grown-ups in an attempt to get into Gramsy's game night.
6	6	"A Great Gift for Gramsy"	Sean Petrilak	Jason Blackman	September 13, 2021
Ellen and Becky find themselves struggling to find the perfect gift for Gramsy on Grandparents Appreciation Day.
7	7	"Fine Feathered Friends"	Erik Knutson	Kevin A. Leman II & Jennifer Skelly	September 13, 2021
After struggling to help a lonely macaw make a friend at the aviary, Ellen realizes that she made a new friend herself.
8	8	"Becky's Big Problem"	Sean Petrilak	Jason Blackman	September 13, 2021
When Ellen moves hide-and-seek into Gramsy's huge walk-in closet, Becky discovers that, though she is not the best hider, she still continues being the best finder.
9	9	"Happy Elloween"	Sarah Johnson	Jason Blackman	October 14, 2021
After deciding they are old enough to go trick-or-treating without a grown-up, Ellen, Freckle and Becky must overcome their fears when Halloween turns out to be spookier than they expected.
10	10	"NOLA Confidential"	Sean Petrilak	Isabel Galupo	October 14, 2021
When the garden they planted for Gramsy is mysteriously destroyed, Ellen, Freckle and Becky play detective to find the culprit.

=== Season 2 (2022) ===
No. overall	No. in season	Title	Directed by	Written by	Original release date
11	1	"Laissez Les Bons Temps Rouler"	Sarah Johnson	Jennifer Skelly	March 3, 2022
12	2	"Freckle the Magnificent"	Sean Petrilak	Kendall Michele Haney	March 3, 2022
13	3	"Bored Games"	Roulin Li	Jason Blackman	March 3, 2022
14	4	"A Room of One's Own"	Sarah Johnson	Isabel Galupo	March 3, 2022
15	5	"Gramsy and the Beast"	Ruolin Li	Kendall Michele Haney	March 3, 2022
16	6	"A Fairytale Ending"	Sarah Johnson	Isabel Galupo	March 3, 2022
17	7	"Express Yourself"	Sean Petrilak	Kendall Michele Haney	March 3, 2022
18	8	"The Tooth Will Set You Free"	Ruolin Li & Cal Ramsey	Isabel Galupo	March 3, 2022
19	9	"Roughin' It"	Sarah Johnson	Jennifer Skelly	March 3, 2022
20	10	"Tallulah Ties the Knot"	Sean Petrilak	Isabel Galupo	March 3, 2022

== International broadcast ==
In Canada, the series premiered on Treehouse TV and StackTV on October 1, 2021. The series premiered on Cartoonito in Latin America on December 1, 2021, as part of its launch. The series premiered on Boomerang in Portugal on June 20, 2022, as part of its Cartoonito block. The series was going to premiere on Cartoonito in the UK and Ireland on July 4, 2022, but it was pulled before it aired.

== Cancellation ==
On August 3, 2022, the series was canceled, leaving the third and fourth seasons (both of which were completed) unreleased. The reason for the sudden cancellation was not disclosed to the public. The series was eventually removed from HBO Max's streaming library permanently two weeks later on August 18, 2022.
