= Taste This =

Live album by Ellen DeGeneres
- Released: October 1, 1996
- Recorded: 1996
- Venue: Portland Center for the Performing Arts, Portland, Oregon
- Genre: Comedy
- Length: 57:59
- Label: Atlantic, Lava, Soda Jerk
- Producer: Ellen DeGeneres, Arthur Imparato, Teresa Boyd

Professional ratings
Review scores
| Source | Rating |
|---|---|
| AllMusic | 3/5 stars |

Taste This is a live album recorded during a stand-up comedy performance by Ellen DeGeneres, in which she talks about common daily problems and enjoying situations that we all can relate to. This is one of her well-known stand-up shows that was a huge success in the United States.

The album peaked at number 30 on the Billboard Top Heatseekers charts.

== Track listing ==
All material written by Ellen DeGeneres

1. "Camping And Hunting" – 6:07
2. "Iroquois Indians" – 3:20
3. "Children" – 4:06
4. "Tourettes" – 1:22
5. "Airplanes" – 11:29
6. "Scary Things" – 4:51
7. "Embarrassing Moments" – 2:30
8. "Licking A Frog" – 3:27
9. "Depends And Leg Warmers" – 2:14
10. "Cat In Heat" – 3:33
11. "Birds Mating" – 1:48
12. "Phone Call To God" – 4:17
13. "Stupid Things" – 4:22
14. "Public Bathrooms" – 7:00
