= Lillian Droniak =

American social media influencer (born 1930)

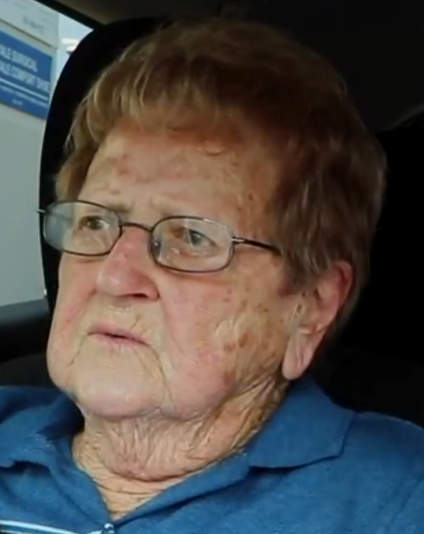
- Droniak in 2020
- Born: March 18, 1930 (age 96)
- Occupation: Influencer

Lillian Droniak (born March 1930), who goes by Grandma Droniak on social media, is an American social media influencer. She has been active on social media since at least 2012, and collaborated with her grandson for some of her videos. She has gone viral multiple times during this period.

== Biography ==
She was born in March 1930. She has described herself as having been a quiet kid at school, and has stated that after school she worked in a factory and raised her family with her husband, John, who died in November 2000.

She began creating social media content with her grandson in 2012, beginning with videos where her grandson would tell her absurd stories and record her reactions. By 2017, the two had accumulated more than 500,000 followers on YouTube and had appeared on Little Big Shots and Jimmy Kimmel Live!.

In 2022, Droniak went viral for a video on rules for her funeral, which accumulated more than 31 million views and included lines stating "Bertha isn't invited" and requiring attendees to get drunk. In 2023, she posted a video instructing her future funeral makeup artist on how to do her makeup. In 2024, she participated in a holiday campaign for Pinterest. She has also detailed her relationships and shared Get ready with me clips and dating advice. She has stated that she feels like "the grandma to the Internet".

In June 2024, she moved into a retirement home after falling and breaking her leg: she has stated that this was because she needed assistance to prevent her from falling again. In this retirement home, videos detailed her social life.

In June 2026, she went viral in a video in which she stated that the retirement home was threatening to evict her for throwing parties. Celebrities including Paris Hilton and Snooki commented. Later, a representative of hers affirmed the retirement home did threaten to evict her, but stated that Droniak had reached a settlement with the nursing home in which she would not supply alcoholic beverages but would be permitted to party late.

She resides in Shelton, Connecticut. She has stated her best friend is Jesus. As of 2026, she had nearly 15 million TikTok followers and 3.6 million Instagram followers.
