= Little Big Shots =

American variety television series

- LBS’ logo for the fourth season (2020)
- Genre: Talent show
- Created by: Steve Harvey; Ellen DeGeneres
- Creative director: Russell Norman
- Presented by: Steve Harvey; Melissa McCarthy
- Music by: Joshua Atchley; Bleeding Fingers Music
- Country of origin: United States
- Original language: English
- No. of seasons: 4
- No. of episodes: 48 + 1 special

Production
- Executive producers: Ellen DeGeneres; Melissa McCarthy; Ben Falcone; Steve Harvey; Jeff Kleeman; Alison Holloway; Ed Glavin; Mary Connelly; Andy Lassner
- Production locations: Television City; Hollywood, California (2016–2018); Warner Bros. Studios; Burbank, California (2020)
- Running time: 44 minutes
- Production companies: East 112th Street Productions (2016–2018); On the Day Productions (2020); A Very Good Production; Warner Horizon Television

Original release
- Network: NBC
- Release: March 8, 2016 – May 24, 2020

Related
- Little Big Shots: Forever Young

Little Big Shots (also known as LBS) is an American variety television series co-created and produced by Steve Harvey and Ellen DeGeneres. The series features children demonstrating talents and engaging in conversation with the host.

The series was ordered by NBC in May 2015 for an eight-episode first season, which premiered on March 8, 2016, with Steve Harvey as host. On March 14, 2016, NBC renewed the series for a second season, which premiered on March 5, 2017. The series was renewed for a third season, which premiered on March 18, 2018. A special holiday episode aired on December 12, 2018. In May 2019, nearly a year after the third season finished airing, it was announced that the series had been renewed for a fourth season and that Melissa McCarthy would be replacing Harvey as the new host. The fourth season premiered on February 24, 2020.

Logo used from 2016 to 2018

== Episodes ==
Season	Episodes		Originally released	
Season	Episodes		First released	Last released
1	9		March 8, 2016	May 8, 2016
2	13		March 5, 2017	June 14, 2017
3	12	7	March 18, 2018	April 29, 2018
3	12	5	June 14, 2018	July 12, 2018
Christmas Special			December 12, 2018	
4	13		February 24, 2020	May 24, 2020

=== Season 1 (2016) ===
No. overall	No. in season	Title	Original release date	Prod. code	U.S. viewers (millions)
1	1	"Little Bruce Lee"	March 8, 2016	101	12.81
2	2	"Little Boy Blue"	March 13, 2016	103	15.00
3	3	"I'm Not a Princess"	March 20, 2016	105	13.32
4	4	"A One, Two Punch"	March 27, 2016	104	10.57
5	5	"Little Piece of Heavenly"	April 3, 2016	102	11.33
6	6	"The Karate Kid"	April 10, 2016	106	12.27
7	7	"Little Piano Man"	April 17, 2016	107	10.66
8	8	"The Idiom of Love"	May 1, 2016	108	10.10
9	9	"Top 10 Moments"	May 8, 2016	109	7.57

=== Season 2 (2017) ===
No. overall	No. in season	Title	Original release date	Prod. code	U.S. viewers (millions)
10	1	"We're Back"	March 8, 2010	201	11.72
11	2	"Little Barber Shop"	March 15, 2010	202	10.12
12	3	"New Sheriff in Town"	March 22, 2010	203	9.58
13	4	"The Princess and the Hot Dog"	March 29, 2010	204	9.81
14	5	"Tugging on the Harp Strings"	April 5, 2010	205	8.65
15	6	"Tiny Dancer"	April 12, 2010	206	8.76
16	7	"The Snail Whisperer"	April 19, 2010	207	8.40
17	8	"Bend It Like Bella"	April 26, 2010	208	8.89
18	9	"Little Big Steppers"	May 3, 2010	209	7.97
19	10	"Memory Lane"	May 10, 2010	210	7.34
20	11	"Little Big News"	May 17, 2010	211	7.45
21	12	"The Magic Johnsons"	May 24, 2010	212	7.04
22	13	"The Grande Finale"	June 7, 2010	213	7.29

=== Season 3 (2010-11) ===
No. overall	No. in season	Title	Original release date	Prod. code	U.S. viewers (millions)
Part 1
23	1	"Third Time's a Charm"	October 11, 2010	301	6.00
24	2	"We're in La La Land"	October 18, 2010	302	7.54
25	3	"Eggcellent Eggsperiment"	October 25, 2010	303	5.97
26	4	"Little Miss Sunshine"	November 1, 2010	304	6.67
27	5	"Beauty and the Steve"	November 8, 2010	305	5.66
28	6	"Too Many Chefs"	November 15, 2010	306	5.93
29	7	"Tour De Harvey"	November 22, 2010	307	6.04
Part 2
30	8	"Little Ninja Warrior"	April 11, 2011	308	5.68
31	9	"Give Us S'mores"	April 18, 2011	309	5.62
32	10	"Sreveosaurus Rex"	April 25, 2011	310	5.96
33	11	"Brotherly Love"	May 2, 2011	311	6.51
34	12	"Double the Fun"	May 9, 2011	312	5.84

=== Christmas Special (2018) ===
No. overall	No. in season	Title	Original release date	Prod. code	U.S. viewers (millions)
35	1	"Little Big Holiday Special"	December 12, 2018	313	5.20

=== Season 4 (2020) ===
No. overall	No. in season	Title	Original release date	Prod. code	U.S. viewers (millions)
36	1	"You Don't Have to be Big, to be a Big Deal"	February 24, 2020	401	4.72
37	2	"You Be You"	March 1, 2020	402	3.40
38	3	"Icing on the Cake"	March 8, 2020	403	3.15
39	4	"Best Day of My Life"	March 15, 2020	404	2.69
40	5	"Great Big Little Music Show"	March 22, 2020	405	3.36
41	6	"On Top of the World"	March 29, 2020	406	2.92
42	7	"I May Be Short But My Dreams Are Giant"	April 5, 2020	407	2.63
43	8	"Be Mighty"	April 19, 2020	408	2.66
44	9	"Strong Is the New Pretty"	April 26, 2020	409	2.94
45	10	"Together We'll See It Through"	May 3, 2020	410	2.84
46	11	"Endless Dreams That Are Reachable"	May 17, 2020	411	2.08
47	12	"Lean On Me"	May 24, 2020	412	1.95
48	13	"The World Just Touches My Heart"	May 24, 2020	413	1.68

== Reception ==
=== Ratings ===
The series premiered as a "preview" after The Voice with more than 12 million viewers, it then premiered in its regular Sunday at 8:00 PM timeslot on March 13, 2016 and it proved to be a hit for NBC with more than 15 million viewers.

Season	Time slot (ET/PT)	Episodes	Season premiere		Season finale		TV season	Rank	Viewers (in millions)
Season	Time slot (ET/PT)	Episodes	Date	Viewers (in millions)	Date	Viewers (in millions)	TV season	Rank	Viewers (in millions)
1	Tuesday 10:00 pm (Premiere); Sunday 8:00 pm	9	March 8, 2016	12.81	May 8, 2016	7.57	2015–16	#13	12.39
2	Sunday 8:00 pm (1-10); Wednesday 8:00 pm (11-13)	13	March 5, 2017	11.72	June 14, 2017	7.29	2016–17	#25	10.32
3	Sunday 7:00 pm (Premiere); Sunday 8:00 pm (1-7); Thursday 8:00 pm (8-12)	12	March 18, 2018	6.00	July 12, 2018	5.84	2017–18	#57	7.18
4	Monday 10:00 pm (Premiere); Sunday 8:00 pm (2-4); Sunday 7:00 pm (5-12)	13	February 24, 2020	4.72	May 24, 2020	1.68	2019–20		

== Forever Young ==
In September 2016, NBC ordered a senior-focused spin-off, Little Big Shots: Forever Young, which premiered on June 21, 2017 and aired for 6 episodes. This season included an appearance by Lillian Droniak.

No.	Title	Original release date	Prod. code
1	"Forever Young"	June 21, 2017	101
2	"Age Ain't Nothing But a Number"	June 28, 2017	102
3	"103 Years Young"	July 5, 2017	103
4	"Jaws of Life"	July 12, 2017	104
5	"Young at Heart"	July 19, 2017	105
6	"Never Too Old to Dream Big"	July 26, 2017	106

== Awards and nominations ==
Year	Association	Category	Nominee(s)	Result	Source
2016	Primetime Emmy Awards	Outstanding Host for a Reality or Reality-Competition Program	Steve Harvey	Nominated	
2016	NAACP Image Awards	Outstanding Reality Program/Reality Competition Series	Little Big Shots	Nominated	

== International versions ==
The international rights are distributed by Warner Bros. International Television Production. Format created by Twenty Twenty Production Limited.

Country/language	Local title	Host	Channel	Date aired/premiered
Arab World	Little Big Stars	Ahmed Helmy	MBC 1 MBC 3 MBC Iraq; LBCI International	November 16, 2018
Armenia	Մեծ փոքրիկներ	Hrant Tokhatyan	Shant TV	March 11, 2018
Australia	Little Big Shots	Shane Jacobson	Seven Network	August 27, 2017
Belgium	Little Big Shots	Nathalie Meskens	VTM	September 2, 2016
China	神奇的孩子	Xie Na	Hunan Television	February 3, 2017
Colombia	Grandes Chicos	Andrés López	RCN Televisión	March 8, 2016
France	Little Big Stars	Cyril Hanouna	C8	January 22, 2018
Georgia	პატარების დიდი შოუ	Duta Skhirtladze	Imedi TV	December 14, 2020
Germany	Little Big Stars	Thomas Gottschalk	Sat.1	April 23, 2017
Indonesia	Little Big Shots	Tora Sudiro (season 1); Irfan Hakim (season 2)	GTV	October 6, 2017
Iran	اعوجبه ها	Mehran Ghafourian (season 1); Nader Soleimani (season 2)	IRIB TV3	2019
Israel	הם גדולים	Eli Yatzpan	Keshet 12	December 14, 2017
Italy	Little Big Show	Gerry Scotti	Canale 5	December 13, 2016
Mexico	Grandes Chicos	Claudia Lizaldi	Azteca Uno	January 29, 2017
Netherlands	Little Big Stars	Najib Amhali	RTL 4	September 8, 2017
Philippines	Little Big Shots	Billy Crawford	ABS-CBN	August 12, 2017
Russia	Лучше всех!	Maksim Galkin (2016–2022); Zhanna Badoeva (2023)	Channel One	November 6, 2016
Spain	Little Big Show	Carlos Sobera	Telecinco	December 29, 2017
Saudi Arabia	Little Big Stars; Little Big News	Yasser Al-Qahtani	MBC Group; MBC 1 MBC Iraq; MBC 3	March 8, 2021
Thailand	Little Big Shots ตัวเล็ก...โชว์ใหญ่	Note Chernyim	Channel 3	2018
Ukraine	Круче всех	Andrey Domansky; Andrey Danilevich	Inter	September 10, 2017
United Kingdom	Little Big Shots	Dawn French	ITV	March 1, 2017
Vietnam	Mặt Trời Bé Con	Lại Văn Sâm	VTV3	September 9, 2017

== See also ==
- Steve Harvey's Big Time Challenge
