= First Dates (American TV series) =

- Genre: Reality
- Starring: Sandro Coppola
- Narrated by: Drew Barrymore
- Country of origin: United States
- Original language: English
- No. of series: 1
- No. of episodes: 8

Production
- Executive producer: Ellen DeGeneres
- Running time: 60 minutes (inc. adverts)
- Production companies: A Very Good Production; Shed Media

Original release
- Network: NBC
- Release: April 7 – May 26, 2017

First Dates is an American reality television show based on the British version of the show of the same name. It first aired on the NBC network on April 7, 2017. Ellen DeGeneres was the executive producer and Drew Barrymore narrated. It was not picked up for a second season.

== Format ==
The show was filmed at the MK Restaurant in near North Side Chicago, showing many people on blind dates—i.e., they haven't met each other before. At the end of the date, the couples were interviewed together and asked whether they would like to see each other again.

Since transmission of the first season's final episode, the MK Restaurant has closed, due to a dispute between the building's new landlord and the owner. Its final service was on Tuesday, June 13, 2017.

== Episodes ==
Viewership and ratings per episode of First Dates
No.	Title	Air date	Rating/share (18–49)	Viewers (millions)	DVR (18–49)	DVR viewers (millions)	Total (18–49)	Total viewers (millions)
1	"Wine Makes Me Crazy"	April 7, 2017	0.8/4	3.78	TBD	TBD	TBD	TBD
2	"No Idea What Her Name Is"	April 14, 2017	0.7/3	3.16	TBD	TBD	TBD	TBD
3	"A Cat is a Red Flag"	April 21, 2017	0.7/3	3.48	TBD	TBD	TBD	TBD
4	"Should I Try to Kiss You?"	April 28, 2017	0.7/3	3.24	TBD	TBD	TBD	TBD
5	"Love is Like a Shot of Tequila"	May 5, 2017	0.7/4	3.55	TBD	TBD	TBD	TBD
6	"You Wrote a Song About My Plant?"	May 12, 2017	0.7/3	3.34	TBD	TBD	TBD	TBD
7	"I Take a Lot of a Selfies"	May 19, 2017	0.7/3	3.23	TBD	TBD	TBD	TBD
8	"Never Been Kissed"	May 26, 2017	0.7/3	3.51	TBD	TBD	TBD	TBD
