= Ellen DeGeneres: Relatable =

- Written by: Ellen DeGeneres
- Directed by: Joel Gallen; Tig Notaro
- Starring: Ellen DeGeneres
- Country of origin: United States
- Original language: English

Production
- Cinematography: Cameron Barnett
- Editor: Bill DeRonde
- Running time: 68 minutes
- Production companies: A Very Good Production; Tenth Planet; Netflix Studios

Original release
- Network: Netflix
- Release: December 18, 2018

Ellen DeGeneres: Relatable is a 2018 American stand-up comedy special by comedian and television host Ellen DeGeneres. It premiered on December 18, 2018, on Netflix. Relatable was her first stand-up special since her 2003 HBO special, Ellen DeGeneres: Here and Now.

The special was performed at the Benaroya Hall in Seattle, Washington on August 22 and 23, 2018.
