= Andy Lassner =

American television producer (born 1966)

- Born: December 30, 1966 (age 59); Bogotá, Colombia
- Occupation: Television producer
- Years active: 1996–present
- Children: 3

Andy Lassner (born December 30, 1966) is a Colombian-born American television producer. He was the executive producer of The Ellen DeGeneres Show from its inception in 2003 to the final episode in 2022. Lassner was featured in many segments in the show. His career as a producer began in the mid 1990s, including The Jane Whitney Show, The Richard Bey Show, The List, and The Rosie O'Donnell Show. Lassner has won 18 Daytime Emmy Awards. He is currently the executive producer of The Jennifer Hudson Show.

== Early life ==
Andy Lassner was born to American Orthodox Jewish parents in Bogotá, Colombia. His mother, Danièle G. Lassner, was a foreign language expert. His father, Jules Lassner, was a captain in the United States Marine Corps who was born in New York City to Ukrainian Jewish parents. His parents moved to Bogotá after their marriage for his father's job at Seagram. They lived there for nine years during which they founded a Talmud Torah Hebrew school at the local shtiebel, before returning to New York where they raised their two sons.

== Career ==
Lassner started his career in the mid-1990s as a line producer for The Jane Whitney Show. In the boom of talk shows in the 1990s, he later produced The Richard Bey Show as well as The Carnie Wilson Show. In 2001, Lassner was the co-executive producer of The List. He began working at The Rosie O'Donnell Show in 2002. Andy began working at The Ellen DeGeneres Show in 2003. He was the main role in the segment Average Andy where he plays an average person contrasting with experts in their fields. Another recurring segment featured host Ellen DeGeneres sending Lassner with a celebrity to haunted houses every Halloween; this is due to him being easily frightened. He also served as an executive producer on Ellen's Game of Games and Family Game Fight!.

== Personal life ==
Lassner is married to Lorie and has three children: a daughter and twin sons who were born in 2006. The family resides in Los Angeles. Lassner, a New Yorker, was previously a New York Rangers fan, but is now a supporter of the Los Angeles Kings, where he has season tickets. He is friends with the team's captain Anže Kopitar, hosting him on The Ellen DeGeneres Show to raise donations for Breast cancer awareness month. He supports gay rights in the US. In 2017, Lassner was critical of Donald Trump's "America First" policy.

Lassner has struggled with alcoholism and drug addiction in his past. He became sober for six years, until, while working on The Rosie O'Donnell Show, he took home a case of free Listerine (which has a high alcohol content) and began drinking it to get drunk. He soon relapsed into other forms of addiction. He entered rehab a number of times in 1999 and has been clean ever since.

== Awards ==
Lassner has won 18 Daytime Emmy Awards for The Ellen DeGeneres Show.
