= Joel Gallen =

American television producer and director

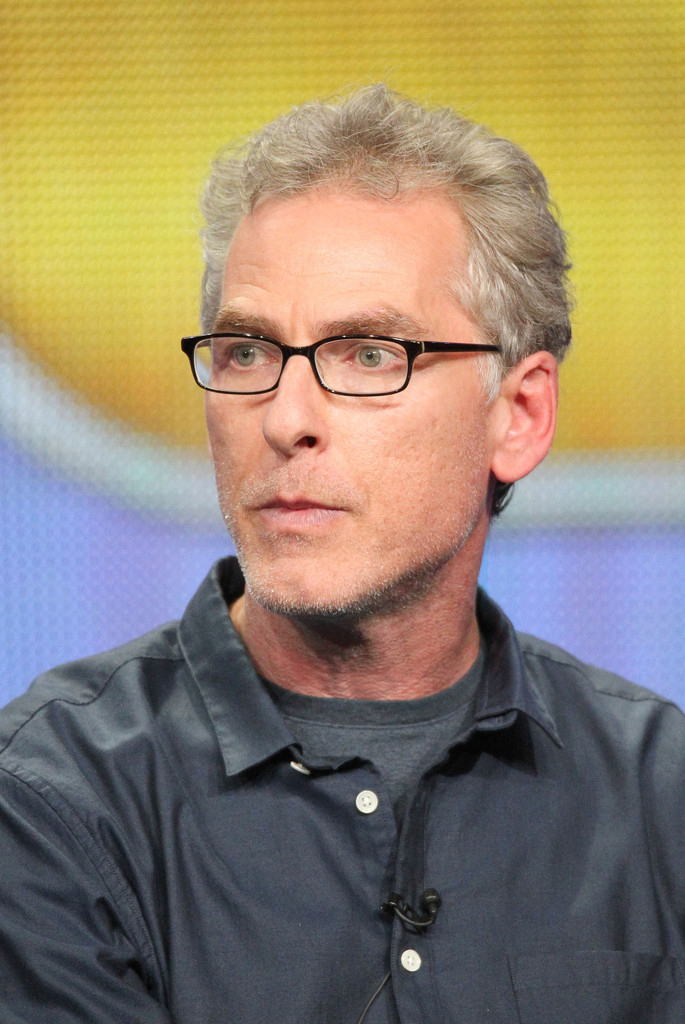
- Gallen in 2012
- Born: Detroit, Michigan, U.S.
- Education: University of Rhode Island
- Occupations: Director; film and television producer
- Title: Founder and president, Tenth Planet Productions
- Board member of: University of Rhode Island Harrington School of Communications and Media Executive Advisory Board
- Awards: Emmy award; DGA award; Peabody award; PGA award
- Website: tenthplanet.net

Joel Gallen is an American director and producer. He is the founder of Tenth Planet Productions, a Los Angeles-based production company.

In addition to the 2025 concert Fire Aid, which raised $100 million for wildfire relief in Los Angeles, Gallen has produced and directed charity telethons and concerts that have cumatively raised more than $540 million for victims of the September 11 attacks; Hurricane Katrina; the 2010 Haiti earthquake and cancer research. In 2025, he produced and directed the Rock and Roll Hall of Fame induction ceremony—his 22nd—and executive produced the IHeartRadio Music Awards for the fifth time.

Gallen created the MTV Movie Awards and the comedic short films that became their signature. He also produced and directed stand-up shows and comedy specials for Comedy Central and HBO, directed Not Another Teen Movie, and executive produced the film Zoolander, which was based on a VH-1 Fashion Awards short film.

He has been nominated for 14 Emmy awards, from a 2001 nomination for Ellen DeGeneres' HBO special, The Beginning, to two 2023 nominations for Chris Rock's livestreamed Netflix special, Selective Outrage.

== Early life and education ==
Gallen was born in Detroit, Michigan and raised in Rockville Centre, New York. He attended the University of Rhode Island where he, as a member of the school's entertainment committee, booked on-campus concerts by artists including Charlie Daniels, The J. Geils Band and Andy Kaufman. He also DJ'd on the school's radio station, WRIU. He graduated with a BS in marketing.

== Career ==
=== New York ===
==== Uncle Floyd, Deja View, Top of the Pops ====
After working in the mailroom at ICM, Gallen was hired by a television syndication company, George Back and Associates (later known as All-American Television). Over the next four years, Gallen marketed, syndicated and produced television shows, including the Uncle Floyd Show, a Newark New Jersey UHF program that Back and Gallen syndicated to NBC affiliates. Gallen's first job in production, his role included booking musical guests such as the Ramones, Paul Simon and Blue Öyster Cult.

Gallen believed there was a substantial audience for music videos by artists from the 60s and 70s, and as MTV (and the videos by new artists it programmed) became increasingly popular, he created and produced Deja View, two one-hour specials composed of original music videos for older hit songs, often featuring the original artists. The video for Sly and the Family Stone's Everyday People" starred Sly Stone; "Good Lovin'" starred Felix Cavaliere; "Bus Stop featured Graham Nash; and the Beach Boys hit "Don't Worry Baby" starred Brian Wilson. Actors also appeared in Deja View videos -- "A Whiter Shade of Pale" featured Harry Dean Stanton (as well as Bernie Taupin), and She's Not There starred Teri Garr. Hosted by John Sebastian of The Lovin' Spoonful, the specials were sponsored by Lincoln-Mercury.

Gallen subsequently produced A Soul Session: James Brown and Friends; a Cinemax special taped at a small club in Detroit, it featured Brown and Aretha Franklin. He also produced the American version of the long-running UK music show, Top of the Pops. Unlike the British program, where bands lip-synced to their music, he had the artists play live. Among others, David Bowie, Bryan Adams, Sting, INXS, Belinda Carlisle and Depeche Mode performed on the show, which aired on CBS for 26 weeks.

==== Video Music Awards, Unplugged, MTV Movie Awards ====
In 1989 Gallen was named head of production for MTV. During his first year at the network, he served as the producer of the Video Music Awards and the executive producer of MTV Unplugged, which he helped to develop. Gallen said: "The real big win for Unplugged (was) we got the big arena acts to strip down and go acoustic." Among others, Paul McCartney, Eric Clapton, Pearl Jam, R.E.M., Elton John and LL Cool J performed. McCartney released an Unplugged album, as did Clapton, whose Unplugged album went 26x platinum and became the best-selling live album of all time.

Gallen produced the VMAs from 1990-1993. Approaching the broadcast as "a rock n' roll show first and a television show second," the 1992 VMAs featured Nirvana, Guns N' Roses, Pearl Jam, The Black Crowes, and Def Leppard, among others. In his book Your Favorite Band is Killing Me, Steven Hyden wrote: "The 1992 VMAs were the fulcrum between the ’80s and ’90s, a show where you could actually watch one era end and another begin in real time."

In 1992, Gallen created the MTV Movie Awards. Irreverent in tone, Gallen said it was the opposite of the Oscars. "We wanted to have some fun with it and come up with categories that our audience cared about.” The categories included "Best Kiss", "Best Villain" and "Best Fight." "A hilarious spoof of the Oscars and a celebration of movies," Gallen developed, directed and produced the short film parodies that became a signature of the MTV Movie Awards; they included Sarah Jessica Parker in Sex and The Matrix and Ben Stiller as Tom Cruise's stunt double in Mission: Improbable. Jack Black, Will Ferrell, Samuel L. Jackson and Justin Timberlake, among others, also appeared in the MTV Movie Awards film parodies.

== Los Angeles ==
=== Tenth Planet Productions ===
Mainly interested in directing and producing, Gallen's management role at MTV kept him from working in the trenches of production. In December 1993, he left MTV and moved from New York to Los Angeles, where he founded Tenth Planet Productions. At the time, he had two series in development—one for HBO and one for ABC—and a special in development at Fox. He continued to work in association with MTV, executive producing and directing the Movie Awards from 1995 through 2006 and in 2018. He also executive produced and directed the VH1 Fashion Awards from 1996-1998. Gallen and head writer Drake Sather created the "professionally good-looking supermodel Derek Zoolander" for Ben Stiller for a Fashion Awards short film.

==== Benefit concerts, telethons, and tributes: America: A Tribute to Heroes, Concert for the Gulf Coast, Hope for Haiti Now, Taylor Hawkins and Chris Cornell Tribute Concerts, Fire Aid ====
Four days after the September 11 attacks Gallen was enlisted by the heads of the four major television networks to produce and direct America: A Tribute to Heroes, a benefit to raise money for victims of the 9/11 attacks. 22 artists performed on candle-lit soundstages in New York, Los Angeles and London, and 20 actors spoke briefly from the stage. Other actors and celebrities—organized by George Clooney—manned phone banks to collect donations. Put together in six days, the telethon aired live on September 21, 2001. Gallen said: "I did not want the show to feel celebratory. I did not want a live audience...no introductions, no applause, no fanfare." A Tribute to Heroes was simulcast commercial-free by more than 35 broadcast and cable networks and 8000 radio stations. Seen in 120 countries, it raised an estimated $150 million in two hours. Gallen won an Emmy (Outstanding Producing for a Variety, Music or Comedy Program), a Peabody Award, and a Director's Guild Award. He also won the first Producers Guild Visionary Award.

On September 9, 2005—again enlisted by the heads of several broadcast networks—Gallen produced and directed Shelter from the Storm: A Concert for the Gulf Coast. A benefit for victims of Hurricane Katrina, the tone of the concert was similar to that of A Tribute to Heroes: solemn. The one-hour show aired live and commercial-free on 30 broadcast and cable networks and raised $30 million for Red Cross and Salvation Army relief efforts.

In 2010, in association with MTV, he executive produced and directed Hope for Haiti Now, a concert telethon that raised money for victims of the January 12 earthquake in Haiti. Developed by Gallen, Clooney, and Wyclef Jean, the show was broadcast live from stages in New York, Los Angeles, and London. Anderson Cooper reported live from Port-au-Prince. Airing on 60 broadcast, cable, and online outlets, it was then the most widely distributed telethon in history. The telethon raised $61 million for Haitian relief through seven non-profit organizations. An album that included all of the live performances from the event debuted at #1 on the Billboard charts.

Gallen produced and directed the Stand Up to Cancer telethons in 2012 and 2014. It was nominated for an Emmy in the Outstanding Informational Series or Special category in 2013 and raised $100 million for clinical trials in 2014. Gallen executive produced the live broadcasts with Gwyneth Paltrow. In 2014, he directed and produced The Concert for Valor. Created to raise awareness and money for veteran's charities, HBO broadcast the concert live from the National Mall in Washington DC on Veterans Day. He produced 'Eric Clapton and Friends In Concert: A Benefit for the Crossroads Centre at Antigua; Paul McCartney and Friends Live: PETA's Millennium Concert; The Concert of the Century: A Benefit for VH-1 Save the Music; and produced and directed CNN Heroes from 2007-2010.

Gallen directed and executive produced the 2022 London and Los Angeles concerts in honor of Taylor Hawkins following his death. Produced in partnership with the Hawkins family and the Foo Fighters, it was "one of the most emotional, eclectic and joyous celebrations of rock music in recent memory: a fitting tribute for one of rock's most beautiful souls." The London concert, which was broadcast live worldwide, featured Foo Fighters, Paul McCartney, Queen, Rush, Pretenders, and Wolfgang Van Halen, among others. In 2019, he produced I Am the Highway: A Tribute to Chris Cornell. Hosted by Jimmy Kimmel, it featured performances by artists including Metallica, Miley Cyrus, Miguel, Brandi Carlile and Chris Stapleton in addition to Cornell's daughter, Toni, and his bandmates from Temple of the Dog, Audioslave, and Soundgarden.

Gallen signed on to executive produce and direct FireAid two days after the 2025 California wildfires began. "Part-concert, part-fundraiser and part-community-building," he worked with a team that included Shelli and Irving Azoff, who conceived of and initiated the benefit. FireAid was put together in three weeks. It took place in two venues, featured 30 artists, and streamed live on Amazon Prime Video, Apple TV, iHeart, KTLA+, Max, Netflix, Paramount+, Peacock/NBCNewsNow, SiriusXM, TikTok, Veeps and YouTube on January 30, 2025. As of February 7, FireAid had raised more than $100 million for wildfire relief.

==== Rock and Roll Hall of Fame Induction Ceremony, awards shows, and other events ====
Gallen executive produced and directed the Rock and Roll Hall of Fame's Induction Ceremony from 1993-1997—when it aired on MTV and VH1—and from 2003-2014, when it aired on HBO. The 25th Anniversary Rock and Roll Hall of Fame Concert took place over two nights at Madison Square Garden in October 2009 with performances by artists including Simon & Garfunkel, Bruce Springsteen and the E Street Band, Stevie Wonder, Jerry Lee Lewis, B.B. King, Bonnie Raitt, U2, Metallica, Aretha Franklin, Annie Lennox, Jeff Beck and Mick Jagger. Broadcast as a four-hour special on HBO in November, Gallen was nominated for Emmy awards in both the Outstanding Variety, Music or Comedy Special and Outstanding Directing For A Variety, Music Or Comedy Special categories. He returned to executive produce and direct the Hall of Fame induction ceremonies from 2020-2026, with the 2023 and 2024 ceremony airing live on Disney+ and as a three-hour special on ABC. The 2025 induction ceremony streamed live and on-demand on Disney+. A special aired on ABC on January 1 and on-demand on Hulu beginning on January 2, 2026. He also executive produced and directed the 40th Anniversary Hall of Fame induction, which took place at the Peacock Theater in Los Angeles on November 14, 2026.

George Harrison was posthumously inducted into the Rock and Roll Hall of Fame in 2004. In planning that year's induction ceremony, Gallen wrote a letter to Prince—also a 2004 inductee—asking him to play the guitar solo during a performance of Harrison's "While My Guitar Gently Weeps". Gallen said it was his dream to "get everybody up onstage at the end of the night to do 'While My Guitar Gently Weeps' and have Prince come out and do the guitar solo." Gallen met with Prince several times before he agreed to join the ensemble, which also included Tom Petty, Steve Winwood, Jeff Lynne, and Dhani Harrison. "A legendary moment in rock history," Prince's solo closed the 2004 induction ceremony. Gallen re-edited the original footage in 2021, releasing a director's cut of the performance that was "subtly transformed...to illuminate the solo that shook the hall."

In addition to the VMAs, the MTV Movie Awards, and the VH1 Fashion Awards, Gallen executive produced and directed the IHeartRadio Music Awards (2019-2024) and the Film Independent Spirit Awards (2015-2022). He produced the Academy Awards pre-show in 2000 and 2004 and in 2002 directed the Super Bowl XXXVIII halftime show, which he produced in partnership with Jimmy Iovine.

==== Comedy: Chris Rock, Ellen DeGeneres, Comedy Central Roasts ====
Gallen directed and produced three Ellen DeGeneres stand-up specials: The Beginning (2000; HBO), Here and Now (2001, HBO) and Relatable (2018, Netflix). He also directed DeGeneres 2024 special, For Your Approval (Netflix). He was Emmy-nominated for Outstanding Variety, Music, or Comedy Specials for The Beginning and Here and Now. DeGeneres was nominated for her performances. Relatable—which Gallen co-directed with Tig Notaro—marked DeGeneres' return to stand-up after a 15-year break. He EP'd and directed Chris Rock's HBO special, Never Scared, receiving a second 2004 Emmy nomination for Outstanding Variety, Music or Comedy Special. In 2023, he executive produced and directed Rock's Selective Outrage, the first livestream on Netflix. Gallen received two Emmy nominations for his work on the special, including Outstanding Directing for a Variety Special.

Gallen executive produced and directed several one-offs and series for Comedy Central, including Last Laugh (2004-2007), Roast Battle (2016-2018), Pete Davidson's stand-up special, SMD (2016) and The Comedy Jam (2017). He EP'd and directed the Comedy Central Roasts from 2005 through 2019, receiving an Emmy nomination for the William Shatner roast in 2007. In 2013, he directed and produced The Big Live Comedy Show, a special that kicked off the first YouTube Comedy Week. Livestreamed globally from Culver Studios, the show featured comics including Norm Macdonald, Sarah Silverman and Seth Rogen.

In February 2014 Gallen directed Howard Stern's 60th Birthday Bash. "Pretty much a Stern broadcast with a roster of stars as big as an awards show," it aired live from the Hammerstein Ballroom on SiriusXM.

==== Feature films and reality television: Not Another Teen Movie, Zoolander, the Sing-Off, America's Best Dance Crew ====
In 2001, based in part on the success of the character created for the VH1 Fashion Awards short, Paramount Pictures released the feature film Zoolander. Gallen executive produced the film. In a 20-years-later story in Vanity Fair, Andrew Buss wrote that it was "one of those rare films that manages to unite all kinds of audiences for the simplest and best reason: Zoolander sends everyone home happy." Gallen also directed the 2001 comedy Not Another Teen Movie, a parody of films targeted to teenagers. It received mixed reviews, with Richard Roeper writing: "It's stupid, it's obvious, it's scatological and violent -- but it made me laugh and I'm giving it thumbs up, God help me."

Gallen executive produced and directed the live music series Pepsi Smash for The WB during the summers of 2004 and 2005. He executive produced The Sing-Off, an a cappella competition series for NBC from 2009-2011, and MTV's America's Best Dance Crew, a dance competition series, for 7 seasons (2008-2012).

== Selected awards ==
- 2001 Emmy Award nomination (with Ellen DeGeneres), outstanding variety, music, or comedy special (for Ellen DeGeneres: The Beginning)
- 2002 Peabody Award (with others) (for America: A Tribute to Heroes)
- 2002 Visionary Award, Producers Guild of America (for America: A Tribute to Heroes)
- 2002 Emmy Award, outstanding variety, music, or comedy special (for America: A Tribute to Heroes)
- 2002 Emmy Award nomination (with Beth McCarthy-Miller), outstanding directing for a variety, music, or comedy program (for America: A Tribute to Heroes)
- 2004 Emmy Award nomination (with Ellen DeGeneres), outstanding variety, music, or comedy special (for Ellen DeGeneres: Here and Now)
- 2004 Emmy Award nomination (with Chris Rock and Michael Rotenberg), outstanding variety, music, or comedy special (for Chris Rock: Never Scared)
- 2010 Emmy Award nomination for outstanding variety, music or comedy special (for the 25th Anniversary Rock and Roll Hall of Fame Concert)
- 2010 Emmy Award nomination for outstanding directing for a variety, music or comedy special (for the 25th Anniversary Rock and Roll Hall of Fame Concert)
- 2023 Emmy Award nomination for outstanding directing for a variety special (for Chris Rock: Selective Outrage)
- 2023 Emmy Award nomination (with Chris Rock) for outstanding comedy special, live (for Chris Rock: Selective Outrage)

== Selected filmography ==
Year(s)	Title	Credit	Notes	Ref(s)
1989	MTV Video Music Awards	Producer	1989-1993; MTV	
1990	MTV Unplugged	Executive Producer	1990-1993	
1992	MTV Movie Awards	Creator, executive producer short films director	1992–93, 1995–2006, 2018-2019; MTV	
1993-1997	The Rock and Roll Hall of Fame Induction Ceremony	Executive producer, director	MTV and VHI	
1994	Billboard Music Awards	Executive producer	Fox	
1994	Espy Awards	Executive producer	ESPN	
1996	VH1 Fashion Awards	Executive producer	1996-1998; VH1; Directed Ben Stiller shorts in 1998	
1996	Saturday Night Special	Co-executive producer	Fox Co-executive produced with Roseanne Barr	
1997	Jenny McCarthy Show	Executive producer	MTV, 22 episodes	
1999	Eric Clapton and Friends in Concert	Producer, director	VH-1 and Warner Bros. Home Video	
1999	Paul McCartney & Friends: PETA's Millennium Concert	Producer, director	VH1	
1999	Concert of the Century: Save the Music	Producer, director	VH1	
1999	Mariah Carey's Homecoming Special	Producer, director	FOX	
2000	72nd Annual Academy Awards Pre-Show	Producer	ABC 2000, 2004	
2000	A Supernatural Evening with Santana	Producer, director	Emmy award (Outstanding editing); FOX	
2000	Ellen DeGeneres: The Beginning	Executive producer, director	Emmy-nominated; HBO	
2000	Dixie Chicks On The Fly	Executive producer	NBC	
2000	A Very Special Christmas from Washington DC	Executive producer	TNT	
2001	Not Another Teen Movie	Director	Columbia Pictures	
2001	The Victoria's Secret Fashion Show	Producer, director	ABC	
2001	Zoolander	Executive producer	Paramount Pictures and Red Hour Productions	
2001	America: A Tribute to Heroes	Executive producer, director	Aired on 39 networks including ABC, NBC, CBS, FOX, and HBO; Emmy, Peabody, DGA and PGA Award winner	
2002	An Evening with the Dixie Chicks	Executive producer, director	ABC	
2003-2014	Rock and Roll Hall of Fame Inudction Ceremony	Executive producer, director	HBO, Disney+, ABC	
2003	Ellen DeGeneres: Here and Now	Executive producer, director	Emmy-nominated HBO	
2003	Super Bowl XXXVII halftime show	Producer, director	ABC	
2004	Chris Rock: Never Scared	Executive producer, director	Emmy-nominated, HBO	
2004	Pepsi Smash	Executive producer, director	2004, 2005; The WB	
2004	Last Laugh	Executive producer, director	2004-2007; Comedy Central	
2005	Shelter from the Storm: A Concert for the Gulf Coast	Executive producer, director	ABC, NBC, CBS, FOX	
2005	The Comedy Central Roast	Executive producer, director	2005-2019; Comedy Central	
2007	CNN Heroes: An All-Star Tribute	Executive producer, director	2007-2009; CNN	
2008	America's Best Dance Crew	Executive producer	2008-2012; MTV	
2009	25th Anniversary Concert for the Rock and Roll Hall of Fame	Executive producer, director	HBO, 3 Emmy awards	
2009	The Sing-Off	Executive producer, director	2009-2011; NBC	
2009	Greg Giraldo: Midlife Vices	Executive producer, director	Comedy Central	
2010	Hope for Haiti Now: A Global Benefit for Earthquake Relief	Executive producer, director	60 networks including ABC, NBC, CBS, FOX, MTV, HBO; Emmy-nominated	
2011	Give it Up for Greg Giraldo	Executive producer	Comedy Central	
2012	Stand Up To Cancer	Executive producer, director	2012, 2014; ABC, NBC, CBS, FOX, HBO and 30 other networks Emmy-nominated	
2013	The Big Live Comedy Show	Producer, director	Streamed live on YouTube	
2014	The Concert for Valor	Executive producer, director	HBO	
2014	Howard Stern Birthday Bash	Director	Sirius	
2015	Film Independent Spirit Awards	Executive producer, director	2015-2022 IFC	
2016	Roast Battle	Executive producer, director	2016-2018 Comedy Central	
2016	Pete Davidson: SMD	Executive producer, director	Comedy Central	
2017	The Comedy Jam	Executive producer, director	Comedy Central	
2017	DCX MMXVI Live (Dixie Chicks Live)	Executive producer, director	Theatrical and DVD releases	
2018	Ellen DeGeneres: Relatable	Executive producer, director	Grammy nomination (Best comedy album); Netflix	
2019	iHeartRadio Music Awards	Executive producer	2019, 2021-2024; FOX	
2019	I Am the Highway: A Tribute to Chris Cornell	Producer	Live concert and benefit	
2020-2024	Rock and Roll Hall of Fame Induction Ceremony	Executive producer, director	HBO, Disney+, ABC	
2020	iHeart Radio Jingle Ball 2020	Executive producer, director	CW	
2020	Fox Presents: the iHeart Living Room Concert for America	Executive producer, director	Fox, iHeart stations	
2020	Tiger King	Executive producer, director Season 1, episode 8	Netflix	
2020	Jersey 4 Jersey	Executive producer, director	ABC, Apple TV	
2022	Taylor Hawkins Tribute Concerts (London and Los Angeles)	Executive producer, director	Paramount+, CBS; Emmy-nominated (Outstanding Sound Mixing)	
2023	Grammy Tribute to the Beach Boys	Executive producer, director	CBS	
2023	Chris Rock: Selective Outrage	Executive producer, director	Netflix; Livestream	
2023	Preparing Music for Concerts (Foo Fighters)	Executive producer, creative director	Livestream	
2024	Ellen Degeneres: For Your Approval	Director	Netflix	
2025	FireAid	Executive producer, director	Multiple broadcast networks and streaming platforms	
2025	Rock and Roll Hall of Fame Induction Ceremony	Executive producer, director	Disney+, ABC, Hulu	
2026	Power to the People	Executive producer, director	MS NOW	
2026	Rock and Roll Hall of Fame Induction Ceremony, 40th Anniversary	Executive producer, director	ABC, Disney +, Hulu	
