= Ellen DeGeneres: Here and Now =

- Genre: Comedy film
- Created by: Ellen DeGeneres
- Written by: Karen Anderson; Ellen DeGeneres; Karen Kilgariff; Kevin Seccia
- Directed by: Joel Gallen
- Starring: Ellen DeGeneres
- Country of origin: United States

Production
- Running time: 60 min.

Original release
- Network: HBO
- Release: June 25, 2003

Ellen DeGeneres: Here and Now is a stand-up comedy routine that was shown on HBO. This was Ellen DeGeneres's second HBO special. This hour-long special focused on everyday situations, as DeGeneres put it: modern life and other inconveniences. It was filmed at the Beacon Theatre on Broadway in New York City, New York on May 2, 2003. The show first aired on June 25, 2003.

== Subjects addressed ==
- Procrastination
- Television
- Cellular Phone Conversations
- Self-esteem
- Laziness
- Yogurt
- Movie Theaters
- Embarrassing Situations
- Etiquette
