= Jeff Kleeman =

American studio executive

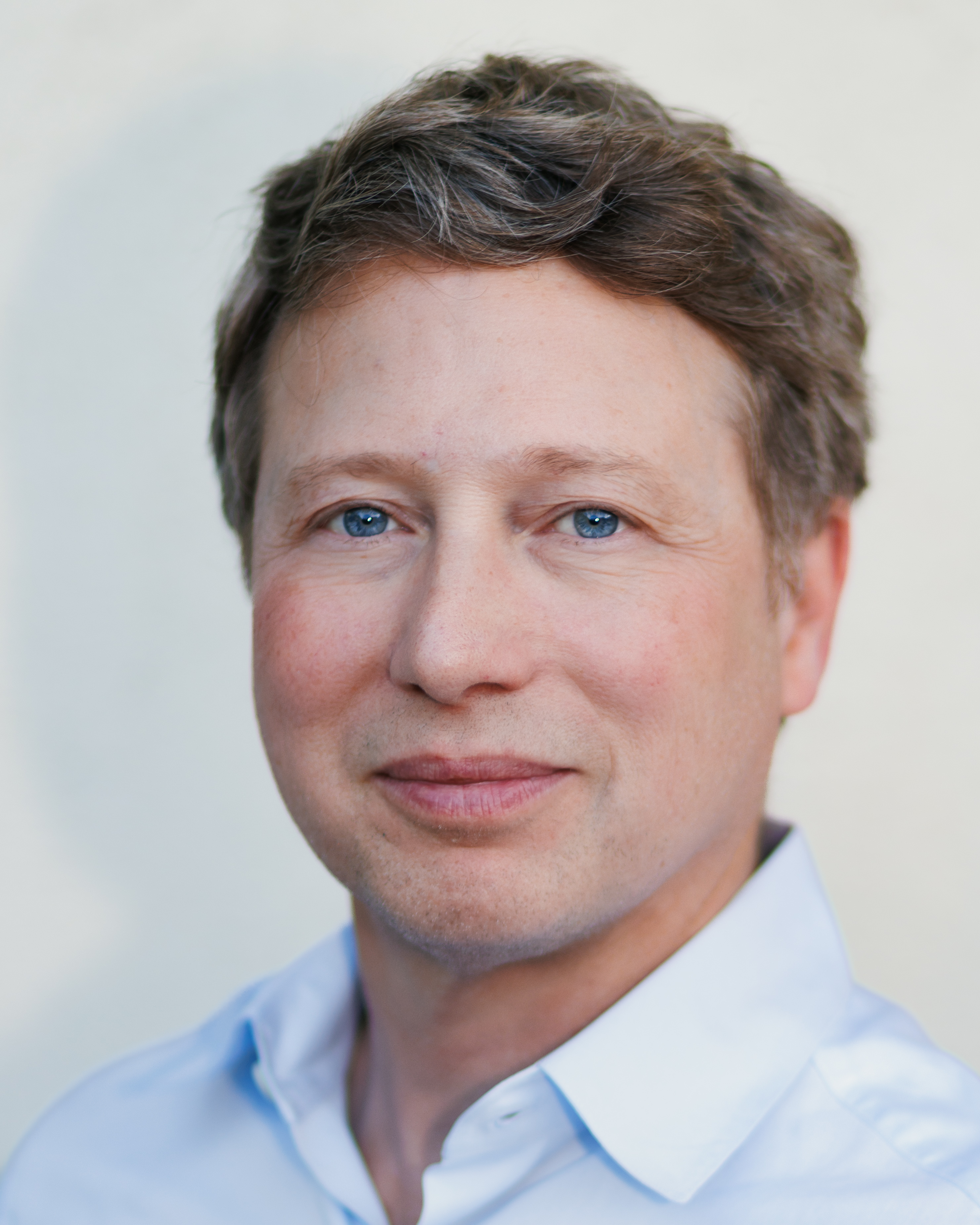
- Kleeman in 2025
- Education: Yale University
- Occupation: studio executive
- Years active: 1986–present

Jeff Kleeman is an American studio executive who led the revival of United Artists’ James Bond franchise. He is credited with developing and overseeing the films GoldenEye, Tomorrow Never Dies, and The World Is Not Enough. Kleeman was also head of Robert Redford’s production company, Sundance Productions and president of comedian Ellen DeGeneres’s production company A Very Good Production.

== Early life and education ==
Kleeman grew up in La Jolla, California. He attended Yale University, graduating in 1986.

== Career ==
Kleeman’s film career began in 1987 as an executive assistant to the president of production at Paramount, where he worked on The Hunt for Red October, Star Trek 6, and other films.

In 1993, he left his role as president of production for Francis Coppola’s production company, American Zoetrope to become vice president of production at United Artists. At United Artists, he developed and oversaw the 1995 film Hackers, Leaving Las Vegas, and The Thomas Crown Affair. Kleeman was also enlisted to manage the revival of United Artists’ James Bond franchise. He oversaw the production and development of the films GoldenEye, released in 1995, and Tomorrow Never Dies, released in 1997. When MGM absorbed United Artists in 1999, Kleeman joined MGM and continued his tenure as production executive of the Bond franchise for the film The World is Not Enough.

In January 2000, Kleeman became the head of Robert Redford’s production company, Sundance Productions.

In 2008 he became president of director David Dobkin’s production company, Big Kid Pictures. Kleeman executive produced Friends with Benefits, and films The Change-Up, The Judge, and Vacation.

In 2012, Kleeman became president of comedian Ellen DeGeneres’s production company A Very Good Production, where he produced 26 series, specials and movies, including the Netflix animated series Green Eggs and Ham.

In May 2023, independent film company Bold Films made Kleeman its CEO.

== Personal life ==
Kleeman is married. He has prosopagnosia, a neurological disorder that causes face blindness.
