= Western Heritage Furniture =

American manufacturer

- Industry: Furniture
- Headquarters: Jerome, Arizona, U.S.A.
- Key people: Tim McClellan, Founder/CEO
- Products: Sustainable Furniture
- Website: westernheritagefurniture.com

Western Heritage Furniture is an American custom furniture manufacturer established by master craftsman Tim McClellan in 1991. The company distinguishes itself by crafting unique furniture pieces using reclaimed lumber sourced from aging buildings and barns. Western Heritage Furniture has garnered recognition, featuring in publications such as the 2009 coffee table book "Contemporary Western Design" by Thea Marx.

McClellan founded Western Heritage Furniture in Seattle with an initial focus on repurposing wood from slash-and-burn piles for furniture construction. In 1995, the company underwent a pivotal relocation to Jerome, Arizona, establishing its operations within the historic Mingus Union High School gymnasium.

== See also ==
- Black Hills (Yavapai County)
- Sustainable living
