= Tim McClellan =

American entrepreneur and craftsman

Timothy McClellan
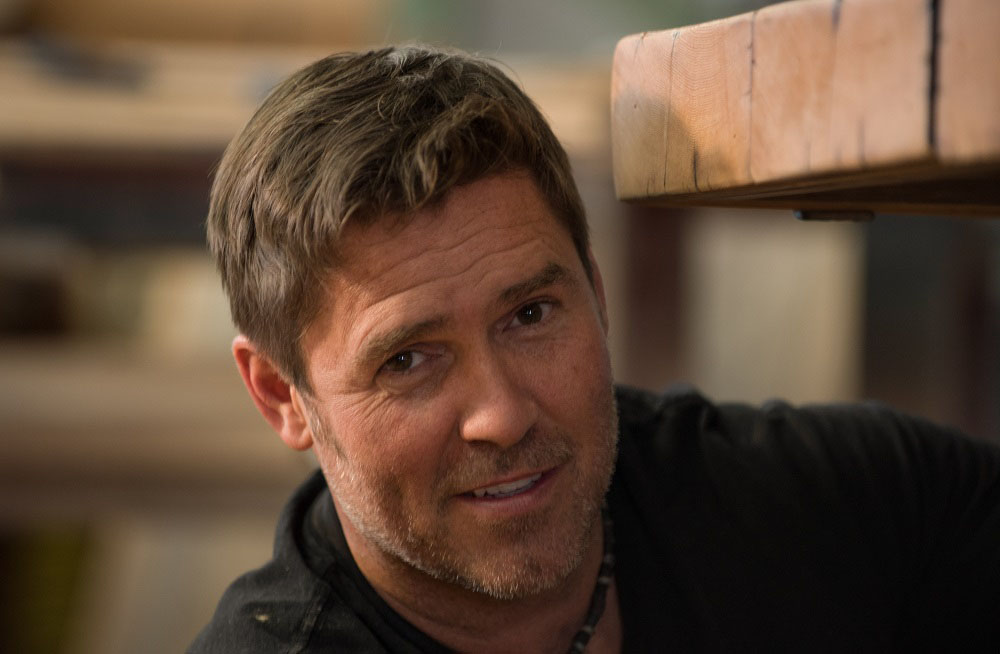
- Born: Frank Timothy McClellan
- Occupations: Master craftsman Entrepreneur; Furniture designer
- Known for: Sustainable Furniture Design
- Spouse: Erika Lynn Roberts
- Website: timmcclellandesigns.com

Tim McClellan is an American entrepreneur and master craftsman, best known for his work in sustainable furniture design. He is the founder of Western Heritage Furniture, an Arizona-based company that makes one of a kind pieces of furniture with reclaimed lumber obtained from old buildings and barns. McClellan is also a founder of Verde Biofuel, considered the only company that manufactures a self-contained mobile biodiesel processor.

McClellan's work has appeared in numerous publications such as The Arizona Republic and Cowboys & Indians Magazine and books that include Contemporary Western Design by Thea Marx and The Best Places For Everything by Peter Greenberg. McClellan was also a featured contestant on the 1st season of Ellen's Design Challenge on HGTV in 2015.

McClellan is the host of Boomtown Builder, a pilot on DIY Network, which first aired on July 25, 2017.

McClellan married Erika Lynn Roberts on May 28, 2017.

== Early life and education ==
McClellan grew up as one of nine children and is a self-taught designer. He was raised in the Appalachian Mountains of Charles Town, West Virginia with six brothers and two sisters. He was raised by his parents on a 100 acre farm located on the Shenandoah River in West Virginia. At the age of 14, he won his school's home-ec prize for his sewing and cooking skills as well as the AG Mechanic award for welding.

In 1985, McClellan's family moved to Maryland where he graduated from Winston Churchill High School in 1987. He was accepted into an honors program at the University of Maryland but decided not to attend college after attending freshman orientation.

== Career ==
McClellan founded Western Heritage Furniture in Seattle in 1991. He began by making furniture from salvaged wood that he reclaimed from slash-and-burn piles. After founding the company, McClellan made a bet with his girlfriend that he could build a lodgepole bed that she wanted for less than the $1,200 retail price. The bed that he completed turned into requests for more beds which led to him being commissioned to furnish entire homes out of reclaimed wood. McClellan visited his sister in Jerome, Arizona in 1994, later relocating the company to this city in 1995.

McClellan is the co-founder of Verde Biofuel, a company that he started with his brothers Dennis and John in 2008. The company specialized in making self-contained mobile biodiesel processors that turn cooking grease into fuel. The biodiesel was then used in the vehicles that deliver Western Heritage Furniture's products to their final destination.

McClellan's work has appeared in numerous publications such as The Arizona Republic, Cowboys & Indians Magazine, and books such as Contemporary Western Design by Thea Marx and The Best Places For Everything by Peter Greenberg. It also led him to television in 2015 when he was featured as one of six contestants on the 1st season of Ellen DeGeneres' competition show Ellen's Design Challenge. McClellan was the winner of the challenge, but later disqualified after his winning design was found to resemble another piece of furniture from another designer. McClellan denied copying the design while admitting similarities of the pieces. McClellan was a fan favorite on the show and after his disqualification his fans criticized HGTV on social media for its handling of the show. The show became the most watched show in HGTV history and McClellan later appeared on an episode of Ellen where she informed McClellan that she did not believe that he intentionally copied the design.

McClellan is the founder of Cowboy Customs Speed Shop, an automobile shop that customizes classic vehicles with materials such as saddle leather, copper, silver, and historic barnwood. McClellan's customizations include fabricating the world's only 1940 4-door 4x4 deluxe pick-up.

McClellan separated from Western Heritage Furniture in 2016.
