= Ellen's Design Challenge =

- Genre: Reality competition
- Presented by: Jay Montepare
- Judges: Amanda Dameron; Christiane Lemieux; Cliff Fong
- Country of origin: United States
- Original language: English
- No. of seasons: 2
- No. of episodes: 15

Production
- Executive producers: Ellen DeGeneres; Jeff Kleeman; Kent Weed; Ian Mallahan; Jonathan Singer; Arthur Smith; Tim Eagan
- Camera setup: Multi-camera
- Running time: 42 minutes
- Production companies: A Very Good Production; A. Smith & Co. Productions; Telepictures

Original release
- Network: HGTV
- Release: January 26, 2015 – March 7, 2016

Related
- The Ellen Show; The Ellen DeGeneres Show; Ellen's Next Great Designer; Ellen's Game of Games

Ellen's Design Challenge is an American furniture design reality competition series that premiered on January 26, 2015, on HGTV. The six-episode first season was announced in April 2014, as the first cable television series executive produced by talk show host Ellen DeGeneres. In June 2015, HGTV renewed the series for a second season, that premiered on January 18, 2016.

== Background ==
The competition series features six furniture designers competing together by showing their abilities in sketching, designing and building furniture within 24 hours. Contestants must demonstrate their creativity and versatility in order to impress a panel of judges after each task they do. HGTV handymen and television personalities Jeff Devlin, Brooks Utley, Karl Champley, Chip Wade, David Sheinkopf and Matt Muenster are the team of carpenters that help the contestants. Jay Montepare is the host of the show while Dwell editor-in-chief Amanda Dameron and Christiane Lemieux, executive creative director at Wayfair, are the judges. DeGeneres is the executive producer and makes numerous appearances throughout the show.

Six contestants of the first season included Jose Gaspar de Jesus, Katie Stout, Tim McClellan, Carly Eisenberg, Mark Moskovitz and Leslie Shapiro Joyal. Katie Stout was declared the winner, and awarded the top cash prize of $100,000 and an opportunity to be featured in HGTV Magazine Tim McClellan was originally the winner but was disqualified making him the runner up .

In June 2015, HGTV renewed Ellen's Design Challenge for a second season, which began airing in January 2016. The second season featured additional competitors and had more episodes (nine instead of six), including a 60-minute-long special episode that showed behind-the-scenes moments. The contestants of the second season included Vivian Beer, Bradley Bowers, Julie Browning Bova, Miles Endo, McKenzie Gibson, Kyle Huntoon, Alexis Moran, Sef Pinney, Melissa Rivera Torres, and Dave Yale.

== Episodes ==
Season	Episodes	Originally released	
Season	Episodes	First released	Last released
1	6	January 26, 2015	March 2, 2015
2	9	January 18, 2016	March 7, 2016

=== Season 1 (2015) ===
No.	Title	Original release date	U.S. viewers (millions)
1	"Crate Expectations"	January 26, 2015	1.84
Six furniture designers from various places all over America gather together at a workshop where they begin competing to earn the title of best designer. Contestants meet their carpenters and prepare for their first task.
2	"Contain Your Enthusiasm"	February 2, 2015	2.20
For the second challenge, the furniture designers go on a field trip to a storage facility where each one of them pick storage pods filled with different household items that they must build furniture for.
3	"Off the Wall"	February 9, 2015	2.19
The contestants receive a special reward from Ellen before moving on to their next challenge. During the building time, a couple of designers get into a small fight over exotic hardwood while a piece of work of another designer starts to take on an animalistic look.
4	"Ouch, We Have to Build A..."	February 16, 2015	1.97
The contestants find out the other challenge as they arrive at the shop. One of the designers is forced to change their design in the middle of the task while another designer makes a sudden mistake that results in making a tough decision. At the end the contestants face harsh criticism.
5	"From Trash to Treasure"	February 23, 2015	1.78
For the next challenge, the contestants have to find items in the junkyard in order to make a piece of furniture. The designers later realise that some of material is not suitable enough while one designer's carpenter team is not up to speed.
6	"And the Winner Is..."	March 2, 2015	2.38
At the season’s finale, the two remaining designers are taken to a very special location to find out the final task. Both contestants struggle to come up with the design. The season ends with a shocking surprise.

== Season 1 elimination table ==
Place	Contestant	Episode					
Place	Contestant	1	2	3^{a}	4^{b}	5^{b}	6^{c}
1	Katie	HIGH	WIN	LOW-N	IN	IN	WINNER
2	Tim	WIN	IN	WIN	IN	IN	DISQUALIFIED
3	Gaspar	LOW	HIGH	IN	IN	ELIM	
4	Carley	IN	LOW	LOW-N	ELIM		
5	Leslie	IN	ELIM				
6	Mark	ELIM					

(WINNER) This designer won the competition due to another contestant's disqualification.
(DISQUALIFIED) This designer finished in second place due to disqualification.
(WIN) The designer won the elimination challenge and was safe.
(HIGH) The designer was one of the top entries in the elimination challenge, but did not win.
(IN) The designer was not selected as a top entry or bottom entry in an elimination challenge.
(LOW-N) The designer was part of a non-elimination bottom two.
(LOW) The designer was one of the bottom entries in an elimination challenge, and was the last person to advance.
(ELIM) The designer was eliminated from Ellen's Design Challenge.

^a No one was eliminated during this episode.
^b There was no winner nor bottom two during this elimination challenge.
^c Tim was originally announced as the winner during the finale, but was later Disqualified, thus giving Katie the win.

== Season 2 elimination table ==
Place	Contestant	Episode								
Place	Contestant	1	2	3	4	5	6^{a}	7	8	9
1	Vivian	IN	HIGH	IN	LOW	LOW	WIN	WIN	IN	WINNER
2	Sef	IN	LOW	WIN	HIGH	LOW	LOW-N	LOW	IN	RUNNER UP
3	Miles	IN	IN	HIGH	WIN	WIN	LOW-N	HIGH	ELIM	
4	Kyle	IN	IN	LOW	IN	LOW	HIGH	ELIM		
5	Melissa	RISK	IN	IN	IN	ELIM				
6	Alexis	IN	HIGH	IN	ELIM					
7	Bradley	IN	WIN	ELIM						
8	McKenzie	IN	ELIM							
9-10	Dave	ELIM								
9-10	Julie	ELIM								

(WINNER) This designer won Ellen's Design Challenge.
(RUNNER UP) This designer finished in second place.
(WIN) The designer won the elimination challenge and was safe.
(HIGH) The designer was one of the top entries in the elimination challenge, but did not win.
(IN) The designer was not selected as a top entry or bottom entry in an elimination challenge.
(IN) The designer was selected to advance on to the final 8.
(LOW) The designer was one of the bottom entries in an elimination challenge, and was the last person to advance.
(LOW-N) The designer was part of a non-elimination bottom two.
(RISK) The designer was at risk of not advancing to the final 8.
(ELIM) The designer was eliminated from Ellen's Design Challenge.
(ELIM) The designer did not make the final 8 and was eliminated from Ellen's Design Challenge.

^a No one was eliminated during this episode.

== Controversy ==
The finale of the first season has sparked some controversy. Katie Stout and Tim McClellan were the two remaining contestants and judges decided to declare McClellan as the winner during the final episode which aired on March 2, 2015. However, it turned out that the winning piece of furniture was very similar to an existing design by European craftsman Simon Schacht. McClellan was eventually disqualified and Stout was named the winner during the taping of The Ellen DeGeneres Show. McClellan appeared on Ellen as well shortly after the controversy and addressed the decision by saying that "the similarities of the two pieces are quite compelling," also adding that he agrees to the decision that has been made and "recognize[s] Katie as the legitimate winner of the show." The controversy has since raised some questions whether it was a publicity stunt.

== See also ==
- Designer Superstar Challenge
- HGTV Design Star
