= Ellen's Next Great Designer =

American reality television series

- Genre: Reality competition
- Directed by: Ramy Romany
- Presented by: Ellen DeGeneres
- Judges: Scott Foley; Brigette Romanek; Fernando Mastrangelo
- Country of origin: United States
- Original language: English
- No. of seasons: 1
- No. of episodes: 6

Production
- Executive producers: Ellen DeGeneres; Caroline Baumgard; Sharalynn Howard; Jeff Kleeman; Ian Mallahan; Arthur Smith
- Producers: Sean Neumann; Rachel Abarbanell
- Cinematography: Brent Barbano
- Production companies: A Very Good Production; A. Smith & Co. Productions; Telepictures

Original release
- Network: HBO Max
- Release: April 22 – May 20, 2021

Related
- The Ellen DeGeneres Show; Ellen's Game of Games; Ellen's Design Challenge

Ellen's Next Great Designer is an American furniture design reality competition television series that aired from April 22 to May 20, 2021, on HBO Max. The six-episode season was announced in April 2021, as the latest furniture competition series executive produced by talk show host Ellen DeGeneres. Previously, DeGeneres had executive produced two seasons of Ellen's Design Challenge on HGTV that aired in 2015 and 2016.

== Background ==
The competition series featured seven promising furniture designers competing against one another in a series of weekly furniture design challenges and had just four short days to bring their piece of furniture from concept to production. Each designer worked out of their home studio and was assisted by a helper of their choice. Each time was designed in-house, but the designers were also able to with outside vendors, such as welders and CNC technicians, to bring their designs into reality.

“I really want to know: Where is design heading? What are the exciting things that the most talented and creative people are thinking about that don’t exist yet?” DeGeneres told AD over email. “No other show is asking and answering these questions, so I’ve created one that does.”

The judging panel featured award-winning furniture designer Fernando Mastrangelo, renowned interior designer Bridgette Romanek, and actor and furniture enthusiast Scott Foley. DeGeneres also weighed in at times.

The seven contestants included Christina Z. Antonio (Manhattan, NYC); Artless founder, Alejandro Artigas (Los Angeles, California); Slash Objects founder, Arielle Assouline-Lichten (Brooklyn, NYC); Vidivixi founder, Mark Grattan (New Hope, Pennsylvania/Mexico City, MX); Paul Rene Furniture founder, Paul Jeffrey (Phoenix, Arizona); Studio S II founder, Erica Sellers (Brooklyn, NYC); and Indo- founder, Urvi Sharma (Providence, Rhode Island).

After a final head-to-head battle with Arielle Assouline-Lichten in a shared Los Angeles woodshop, Mark Grattan as named the winner of the series and awarded the $100,000 prize.

== Episodes ==
Season	Episodes	Originally Aired	
Season	Episodes	Season premiere	Season finale
1	6	April 22, 2021	May 20, 2021

=== Season 1 (2021) ===
Episode No.	Title	Original Air Date
1	"Back to Basics"	April 22, 2021
Scott Foley tasks seven talented designers handpicked by Ellen DeGeneres with their first furniture-making challenge: transforming basic raw materials into show-stopping signature pieces.
2	"Portia's Art of Design"	April 22, 2021
Ellen's wife and special guest Portia de Rossi gives the designers their next challenge: use the color, form, and general feeling of a painting from her art publishing company to inspire an original piece of furniture
3	"Shaping Up With Ellen"	April 29, 2021
The remaining competitors work against the clock to incorporate a 3D geometric shape - from a humble cube to a 20-sided icosahedron - into a furniture design of their choice
4	"Foley Artists"	May 6, 2021
After a virtual tour of Scott's new home, the designers are tasked with building a safe, beautiful, and fun outdoor play structure
5	"Ellen Loves Surprises"	May 13, 2021
Jockeying for a spot in the finals, the designers face their most ambitious challenge yet: bringing a surprise element to a multi functional piece of high-end furniture
6	"The Collection"	May 20, 2021
For their final challenge and the $100,000 prize, the remaining designers face the ultimate test: creating a cohesive three-piece collection for an iconic Los Angeles home.

== Season 1 Elimination Table ==
Place	Contestant	Episode					
Place	Contestant	1	2	3^{a}	4	5	6
1	Mark						WINNER
2	Arielle						RUNNER UP
3	Erica					ELIM	
3	Urvi					ELIM	
5	Christina				ELIM		
6	Paul		ELIM				
7	Alejandro	ELIM					

(WINNER) This designer won the competition due to another contestant's disqualification.
(RUNNER UP) This designer finished in second place.
(ELIM) The designer was eliminated from Ellen's Design Challenge.

^a No one was eliminated during this episode.

== See also ==
- Ellen's Design Challenge
