= Fernando Mastrangelo =

American artist (born 1978)

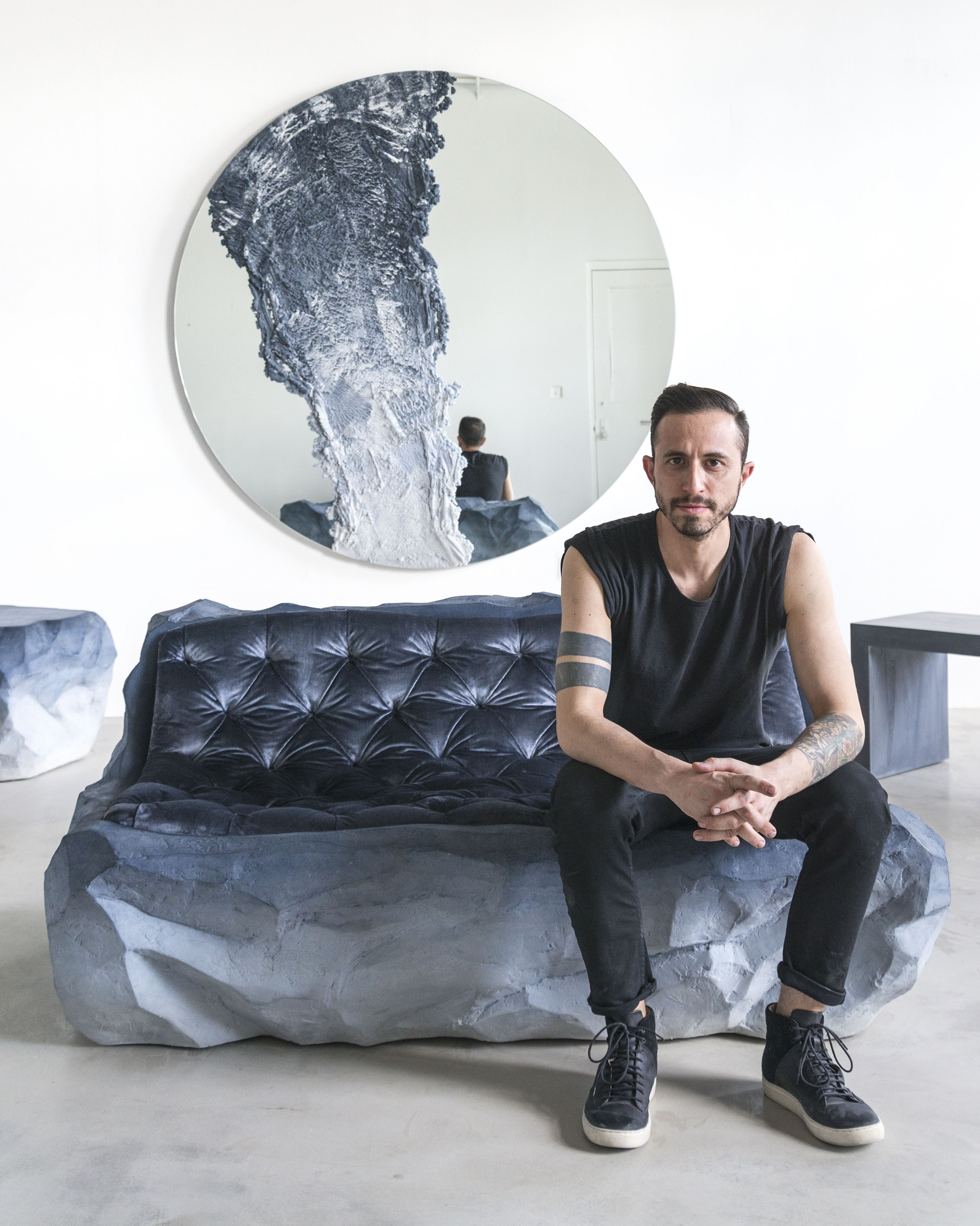
- Fernando Mastrangelo with the Drift Sofa and Drift Mirror, 2016
- Born: 1978 (age 47–48)
- Education: M.F.A. Sculpture, Virginia Commonwealth University
- Known for: Art + Design
- Website: fernandomastrangelo.com

Fernando Mastrangelo (born 1978) is a New York-based artist best known for his collectible design, as well as his large scale sculptures and experiential installations. Mastrangelo is the founder of Fernando Mastrangelo Studio (FM/S).

== Practice ==
Mastrangelo's works are sculpted by hand from natural or repurposed materials such as sand, salt, silica, and crushed or powdered glass. His artistic language is influenced by ecological issues, cultural metaphors, and a reverence for nature that borders on devout.

Fernando received his M.F.A. in Sculpture from Virginia Commonwealth University in Richmond, VA (2004), and his B.F.A. from Cornish College of the Arts in Seattle (2002). Fernando worked for Matthew Barney before launching his own studio, Fernando Mastrangelo Studio (FM/S). Mastrangelo is a pioneer of the independent design studio structure, allowing clients to work directly with the artist.

As a sculptor, Mastrangelo has exhibited extensively throughout the US and internationally in both group and solo shows. In 2008 the Brooklyn Museum acquired Mastrangelo’s Avarice Sculpture, composed of corn maize and inspired by the Aztec Calendar. This work was included in the critically acclaimed exhibition Connecting Cultures in 2012.

Mastrangelo debuted his first furniture line at the 2014 Sight Unseen Offsite and in 2015 was the first independent designer to be featured in Collective Design Fair.

After a 4,000-mile motorcycle journey from Santiago, Chile, to Patagonia— a trip which inspires a great deal of his work— the artist made his first foray into limited edition sculptural furniture with the Drift Collection. In 2017, Mastrangelo designed four collections: Ghost, Thaw, Escape, and Ridge.

Mastrangelo founded In Good Company in 2017, a non-profit that honors creativity and the spirit of the avant-garde by providing a platform for emerging artists & designers to exhibit work without commercial or creative constraints.

In 2019 the artist drew crowds with his Tiny House installation in Times Square, an immersive space where his vision for the future of design could be experienced in real life.

Mastrangelo currently has works in numerous private collections worldwide, as well as works residing in the permanent collections of the Brooklyn Museum and the Cooper Hewitt Museum. He has designed custom works and spaces for top-tier brands such as Audemars Piguet, Stella McCartney, and Dior.

Fernando Mastrangelo currently resides in Upstate New York where he continues to create bespoke works for clients and collectors. He is a judge on Ellen's Next Great Designer on HBO Max.

== Selected exhibitions ==
=== 2019 ===
- The Vallée - Art Basel Collectors Lounge, w/Audemars Piguet, Hong Kong, China
- Tiny House Installation, DesignxNY, Times Square, New York, NY
- Capital Collection, Dubai Design District, Dubai, UAE

2018

- CHUNK Collection, w/Anna Karlin, New York, NY
- Salone Del Mobile, Rossana Orlandi, Milan, Italy
- Dream Collection, Collective Design Fair, New York, NY
- Zona Maco, Mexico City, MX

2017

- PAD London, Rosanna Orlandi, London, UK
- Reverence, Edward Fields, New York, NY
- ESCAPE Collection, Maison Gerard, New York, NY
- Ridge Collection, Sight Unseen OFFSITE, New York, NY
- Ghost Collection & Thaw Collection, Collective Design Fair, New York, NY
- ESCAPE Collection, Salone Del Mobile, Rosanna Orlandi, Milan, Italy

2016

- Salone Art + Design, Maison Gerard, New York, NY
- FADE, Sight Unseen OFFSITE, New York, NY
- Drift Collection, The New, Los Angeles, CA
- Collective Design Fair, New York NY
- Salone Del Mobile, Rosanna Orlandi, Milan Italy
- Heavy, James, Art Geneve, Switzerland

2015

- Drift, RH Contemporary, Los Angeles, CA
- NOTHING, Mike Weiss Gallery, New York, NY
- Brooklyn Museum Artist Ball, Brooklyn NY
- Gold, Neuberger Museum, Purchase, NY

2014

- IDEA Miami, Institute for the Development of Emerging Art (IDEA) and Kowal+Odermatt Projects, Miami, FL
- Barriococo: A Sculpture Show, Royal Society of American Art (curated by Ian Cofre), New York, NY
- Intangible Beauty: Beautiful Women, Kasher/Potamkin Gallery, New York, NY
- Gold, Bass Museum (curated by Jose Diaz), Miami, FL
- Storage Wars, Eric Firestone Gallery, East Hampton, NY

2013

- Medallions, Kowal+Odermatt, Miami, FL
- Group Show, Kowal+Odermatt, Miami, FL
- Elle Décor Showhouse, Miami, FL
- Special Projects, Scope Show, Miami, FL
- Maize y Mas: From Mother to Monster, Movimiento de Arte y Cultura Latino Americano, San Jose, CA

2012

- EAF 12, Socrates Sculpture Park, Long Island City, NY
- Connecting Cultures, Brooklyn Museum, Brooklyn, NY

2011

- Black Sculpture, Charest-Weinberg Gallery, Miami Fl

2010

- Tondo, FAS Contemporary, London UK
- LA Salvamara (MS13 Project), Mendes Wood Gallery, New York, NY
- TEDxSoMa - Capturing the Zeitgeist, San Francisco, CA

2009

- Herd Thinner, Charest-Weinberg Gallery, Miami FL
- CHIMERA, Curated by David Hunt, Miami FL
- Data Panic, Cuchifritos Artspace, New York, NY
- Volta Show NY, "Age of Anxiety" New York, NY
- "LoVE is a smoke made with the fume of sighs...", Kumukumu Gallery New York, NY

2008

- Avarice, Mendes Wood Gallery, Miami, FL & Basel Switzerland
- Intransit, Moti Hasson Gallery, New York NY
- Deadliest Catch: Hamptons, South Hamptons, NY

2007

- Red Badge of Courage, Newark Arts Council, Newark NJ
- "Eastasia", Damrosch Park, Lincoln Center, New York NY

2006

- Malicia, Rare Gallery, New York NY

2005

- Waiting for the Barbarians, RARE plus, New York NY
- Le Desert de Retz, Massimo Audiello Gallery, New York NY
- Ergonomicon, Consolidated Works, Seattle WA

2004

- Madison's Cave, Keith Talent Gallery, London UK
- MFA Thesis Exhibition, Anderson Gallery, Richmond VA
