= Katie Stout =

American artist and designer (born 1989)

- Born: January 18, 1989 (age 37); Portland, Maine, U.S.
- Education: Rhode Island School of Design
- Known for: Lighting, Sculpture
- Partner: Jeff Kinkle

Katie Stout (born January 18, 1989) is an American artist and designer based in New York City. Stout creates work that combines traditional craft techniques, the legacy of female-dominated decorative arts, and contemporary and conceptual art. Her work has been described as "naive pop."

== Career ==
Stout grew up in Berkeley Heights, New Jersey and graduated from Rhode Island School of Design (RISD) with a degree in furniture design in 2012. After graduating, Bjarne Melgaard commissioned her to create the furniture for his installation in the 2014 Whitney Biennial. In 2015, Stout won the inaugural season of Ellen's Design Challenge. She has exhibited at prominent art and design galleries including Jeffrey Deitch, Tina Kim, Friedman Benda, Venus Over Manhattan, Nina Johnson, and R & Company, and institutions such as the Dallas Museum of Art, the Museum of Contemporary Art Santa Barbara, and the Swiss Institute.
