= Vivian Beer =

American designer (born 1977)

- Born: 1977 (age 48–49); Bar Harbor, Maine, U.S.
- Education: Maine College of Art & Design, Cranbrook Academy of Art (MFA)
- Occupation: Designer
- Known for: Furniture design, sculpture
- Spouse: Mariana Rosas Garcia

Vivian Beer (born 1977) is an American designer of metal furniture. Her business is called Vivian Beer Studio Works, and is based in Pembroke, New Hampshire.

== Early life and education ==
Vivian Beer was born in 1977, in Bar Harbor, Maine.

In 2000, Beer received a bachelor's degree in sculpture from the Maine College of Art & Design in Portland, Maine, graduating with honors. in 2004 she received a master's degree in metalsmithing from the Cranbrook Academy of Art in Bloomfield Hills, Michigan.

She is married to Mariana Rosas Garcia.

== Career ==
Beer's artwork is often a blend of automotive and other hardware, typically metal, to create unique pieces of furniture. Her studio uses many of the same tools an auto body shop would have to mend and paint cars. Her designs involve many complex curves that are not easy to replicate using steel. She must hammer, bend, and then curve the material on an English wheel. Next, they are welded, sandblasted, and finally painted into the desired shapes - all by hand - by Beer. Her projects often include abstract style benches, chairs, and other outdoor sculptures with sleek finishes. Her work is often a collaboration of the surrounding nature and culture of where it will be placed. The variety of designs, textures, patterns, and colors in her assortment of work express this goal.

== Recognition ==
Beer was featured on Ellen’s Design Challenge, an American TV series and furniture design competition in 2016, and she won the challenge along with a cash prize. She was featured on The Take magazine's cover in 2016 as “Manchester’s Sexy Industrialist” for her fine, yet functional art.

She was awarded the John D. Mineck furniture fellowship granted her the opportunity to travel the country in an RV for inspiration. She had the experience working at the National Air and Space Museum researching American aeronautic design history in which she received the Smithsonian Artist Research Fellowship for. Along with this, she was amongst the few artists to be awarded $50,000 from United States Artists. Beer was the recipient of the Alumni Achievement Award from Cranbrook Academy, which recognizes alumni who succeed early in their career.

In 2026, Beer was named as a Fellow of the American Craft Council (ACC).

== Collections ==
Beer's work is in the permanent collections of:

- Brooklyn Museum, New York
- Smithsonian American Art Museum, Washington, D.C.
- Currier Museum of Art, Manchester, New Hampshire
- Metal Museum, Memphis, Tennessee
- Museum of Fine Arts, Boston, Massachusetts
