= Karl Champley =

Australian television personality

- Born: Sydney, Australia
- Occupations: Television presenter, construction worker, actor
- Spouse: Diane Matthews
- Website: www.karlchampley.com

Karl Champley is an Australian master builder, television personality and actor. He has hosted Wasted Spaces on the American television network DIY Network. He has also presented DIY to the Rescue (2003) and DIY Inside: The Home Builder's Show (2005) on the same channel.

A tradesman, contractor and builder, Champley has been involved in the building trade since the 1980s. In his native Australia, he is a member of the Master Builders' Association of New South Wales. He is also a registered and certified Home Inspector in the United States.

== Personal life ==
Since 2001, Champley and his wife, Diane Matthews, have resided in Los Angeles.

Champley was friends with the family of British filmmaker Peter Rodger. Rodger referred his son Elliot Rodger, who would go on to murder six people during the 2014 Isla Vista killings, to Champley for construction work, and Elliot briefly worked for him in construction for a time.

== Filmography ==
- Ellen's Design Challenge
