= Game of Games Suomi =

- Genre: Game show Entertainment
- Created by: Ellen DeGeneres
- Based on: Ellen's Game of Games
- Presented by: Aku Hirviniemi; Janne Kataja
- Country of origin: Finland
- Original language: Finnish
- No. of seasons: 1
- No. of episodes: 10 (list of episodes)

Production
- Executive producer: Joona Kortesmäki
- Production locations: Lisbon, Portugal
- Running time: 90 minutes (including adverts); 60 minutes (excluding adverts)
- Production company: Warner Bros. International Television Production

Original release
- Network: MTV3
- Release: 27 November 2021

Game of Games Suomi is a Finnish version of the American game show Ellen's Game of Games. The show premiered in November 2021 on TV channel MTV3, and will be hosted by Aku Hirviniemi and Janne Kataja, with the show being first to have two official hosts.

In each 90-minute episode, a group of contestants have a chance to win money by playing humorous games, and advance to the final.

== Format ==
The format of the show is slightly similar to the other international versions; on the first phase, contestants play a different set of games, of which half are eliminated, meanwhile the others advance. From the semifinal round, only one contestant has the chance to win €20,000.

=== Preliminary Games ===
In each episode, contestants face off in a different set of games, six on each episode. One contestant from each will advance. This is a list of games played in random order during the first round:

- Stretching & banging (Venyy ja paukkuu): Contestants are joined by a bungee cord. The first contestant to move five apples into a basket using only their teeth advances.
- Forbidden Word (Kielletty sana): Two teams of two members each play this game. One person on each team is shown a "winning word" and must give clues to help their partner guess it. The two teams alternate giving clues; a correct guess earns a strike for the opposing team, whose guesser is then sprayed in the face with the contents of one of three cannons. Each round also features a secret "forbidden word" that is related to the winning word; if a guesser says the forbidden word, he/she is sprayed and his/her team earns a strike. The first team to earn three strikes is eliminated, and one member of the winning team advances to "Blindfolded Musical Chairs".
- Dizzy Heads (Päät pyörälle): The game starts with hosts reading aloud a trivia question to the contestants. Before contestants can answer, they are spun around in order to disorient them. To answer the question, the contestants must run to a nearby podium and grab the ball on top of it. The first contestant to answer three questions correctly advances to the next round.
- Off to Fly (Lentoon lähdössä): In this game, three contestants are suspended in the air from harnesses. The contestants take turns to guess answers that fit a given category, such as "Countries on Europe". A category ends when one contestant gives an incorrect answer, repeats a previous answer, or takes too long to respond; when that happens, the contestant gets a strike. A contestant who gets three strikes is eliminated and launched to the top of the studio. The winner would then advance to "Blindfolded Musical Chairs".
- It's Raining Soon (Kohta sataa): For this game, two contestants answer trivia questions asked by hosts for turns at pulling down one of several umbrellas. One of the umbrellas contains a chance at playing "Blindfolded Musical Chairs". The rest of the umbrellas are filled with cold water.
- Pieces in Game (Palat pelissä): This game involves three contestants attached to bungee cords. The contestants then compete to solve a jigsaw-style puzzle. The losing contestants are "blasted" into the air and do not proceed to the next round.
- The Mouth of a Cyclops (Kykloopin kita): This game uses a set of giant prop monster jaws with removable teeth, one of which will cause the jaws to close and eliminate the contestant who pulls it. The contestants took turns answering questions from hosts which have an answer that's between 0 and 5. Depending on how far away they were from the answer, they would have to pull out that amount teeth (i.e., the distance between their incorrect answer and the correct answer). If they got it right, they didn't have to pull any teeth.
- Broken Telephone (Rikkinäinen puhelin): Played with two teams of four, competing one at a time. All members of the team except one wear headphones with loud music. Hosts reveals a sentence to the remaining contestant; the message must be relayed to the entire team using lip reading, similar to Telephone/Chinese Whispers. They earn one point for each correct word from the original phrase. The team with the most points wins; in case of a tie, the teams play again.
- Foam Arena (Vaahtoareena): The game involves two teams of two joined in a giant, coloured 'jumper' and must work together to get five gigantic balls into a 'washing machine'. The teams must watch out for the soap, bubbles and giant, hanging t-shirts. The winning team, who gets all of their balls through the hole in the washing machine, get to choose one contestant to play in the next round, "Blindfolded Musical Chairs".
- Temple of Doom (Tuomion temppeli): Two teams of two must race to the top of a giant pyramid to answer a question from hosts, although the steps are slippery & covered in soap and massive boulders are pushed down to stop contestants. The team who reaches the top of the 'pyramid' and pushes the buzzer gets to answer hosts' question. If they answer incorrectly, the turn goes to the other team. At the end of the game, the team with 3 correct answers or the most points moves on to the next round.
- Paste Tuba (Tahnatuuba): Contestants sit at separate banks of 10 buttons that resemble the valves on a tuba. Hosts asks a series of trivia questions, one to each contestant in turn. If a contestant answers incorrectly, hosts spin a wheel to determine how many buttons (one, two, or three) they must press. One button triggers a blast of toothpaste into the contestant's face and eliminates them from the game.
- Pairs in Game (Parit pelissä): In this game, two teams of spouses or fiancés compete against each other. One partner from each couple is suspended from the ceiling in a harness. The other two partners do an auction-style bid on how many answers their partners can give in a given category (e.g., "national brands of toothpaste") within the 30-second time frame. When one of the partners on the ground issues a challenge, the other team's suspended partner must give the required number of responses. There is no penalty for incorrect answers. Giving the required number of responses earns that team one point, while the opposing team's suspended partner gets dropped. If the challenged team fails, the corresponding spouse is dropped. The first team to earn three points wins and chooses one member of the pair to advance to the next round.

=== Final Games ===
==== Blindfold Chairs (Sokkotuolit) ====
Contestants, who won the preliminary games, play this game and are blindfolded. The contestants dance around until the music stops and must find a randomly placed stool to sit on to stay in the game. Hosts will press a button to determine where the chairs will appear on the dancefloor. The last contestant to not find a seat is eliminated, and others move on to Know or Fall.

==== Know or Fall (Tiedä tai tipu) ====
The winners of the four preliminary games stand on a row of trap doors, and take turns answering questions. An incorrect answer results in the contestant being eliminated from the game and dropped through the trap door, sliding down a chute that empties below the stage. The last contestant standing advances to the last final game.

==== Celebrity Roulette (Julkkisruletti) ====
The contestant has a limited time to identify the faces of celebrities that fit a certain category. After identifying a celebrity, the contestant must press a button to move on to the next face. Contestants may pass if they are unsure but will need to wait three seconds until the next face appears. Contestants earn an escalating amount of money based on the number of faces they correctly identify, as shown in the table below. Correctly identifying all celebrities earns the grand prize of €20,000.

Correct answers	1	2	3	4	5	6	7	8	9	10
Money won	€500	€1,000	€1,500	€2,000	€4,000	€6,000	€8,000	€10,000	€15,000	€20,000

== Episodes ==
=== Season 1 ===
No.	Original release date	Finnish viewers
1	27 November 2021	489,000
Preliminary Games: Temple of Doom / Forbidden Word / Pairs in Game / It's Raining Soon / Off to Fly / Stretching & banging; Preliminary Game Winners: Sanna & Teemu / Katariina & Hanna / Joni & Toni / Tero / Iida / Ville; Winner: Teemu; Celebrity Roulette: €4,000; Game Winner Won: Temple of Doom
2	4 December 2021	358,000
Preliminary Games: Pairs in Game / Forbidden Word / Foam Arena / The Mouth of a Cyclops / Dizzy Heads / Stretching & banging; Preliminary Game Winners: Eetu & Sofia / Antti & Anni / Heidi & Iida / Kaisa / Eeri / Ilppo; Winner: Ilppo; Celebrity Roulette: €20,000; Game Winner Won: Stretching & banging
3	11 December 2021	423,000
Preliminary Games: Pairs in Game / The Mouth of a Cyclops / Forbidden Word / Broken Telephone / Paste Tuba / Pieces in Game; Preliminary Game Winners: Marko & Katriina / Miia / Marko & Toni / Mirella, Anna, ? , ? / Tuomas / Iida; Winner: Marko; Celebrity Roulette: €1,500; Game Winner Won: Forbidden Word
4	18 December 2021	409,000
Preliminary Games: Off to Fly / Foam Arena / Paste Tuba / Stretching & banging / Pieces in Game / Dizzy Heads; Preliminary Game Winners: Marko / Valtteri & Nea / Satu / Sanni / Jere / Otto-Wille; Winner: Marko; Celebrity Roulette: €8,000; Game Winner Won: Off to Fly
5	25 December 2021	316,000
Preliminary Games: Temple of Doom / Pairs in Game / Stretching & banging / Forbidden Word / It's Raining Soon / Dizzy Heads; Preliminary Game Winners: Isabelle & Iina / Jenni & Mikko / Teemu / Nea & Melike / Marianne / Aleksi; Winner: Melike; Celebrity Roulette: €1,500; Game Winner Won: Forbidden Word
6	1 January 2022	414,000
Preliminary Games: The Mouth of a Cyclops / Forbidden Word / Off to Fly / Paste Tuba / .................; Preliminary Game Winners: Winner: Celebrity Roulette: Game Winner Won:

== Production ==
=== Filming ===
The show started to tape in November 2020 in Lisbon, Portugal, in Warner Bros studios, where many other international versions are taped. This just because it was cheaper and there's aren't such big studios in Finland to film at, said Joona Kortesmäki, the executive producer of the show.

== Reception ==
=== Television ratings ===
Colour key:
Highest rated episode
Lowest rated episode

No.	Description	Airing date	Timeslot (EET)	Rank			Viewers			Ref(s)
No.	Description	Airing date	Timeslot (EET)	TS	EV	OVA	Live	Cons.	Total	Ref(s)
1	Desc.	27 November 2021	Saturday, 19:30				0.489	0.912	1.401	
2	Desc.	4 December 2021	Saturday, 19:30				0.358	0.725	1.083	
3	Desc.	11 December 2021	Saturday, 19:30				0.423	0.830	1.253	
4	Desc.	18 December 2021	Saturday, 19:30				0.409	0.755	1.164	
5	Desc.	25 December 2021	Saturday, 19:10				0.316	0.670	0.986	
6	Desc.	1 January 2022	Saturday, 19:30				0.414	0.729	1.143	
7	Desc.	8 January 2022	Saturday, 19:30							
8	Desc.	15 January 2022	Saturday, 19:30							
9	Desc.	22 January 2022	Saturday, 19:30							
10	Desc.	29 January 2022	Saturday, 19:30							

Source: Finnpanel
