= Ellen's Game of Games =

American game show (2017–2021)

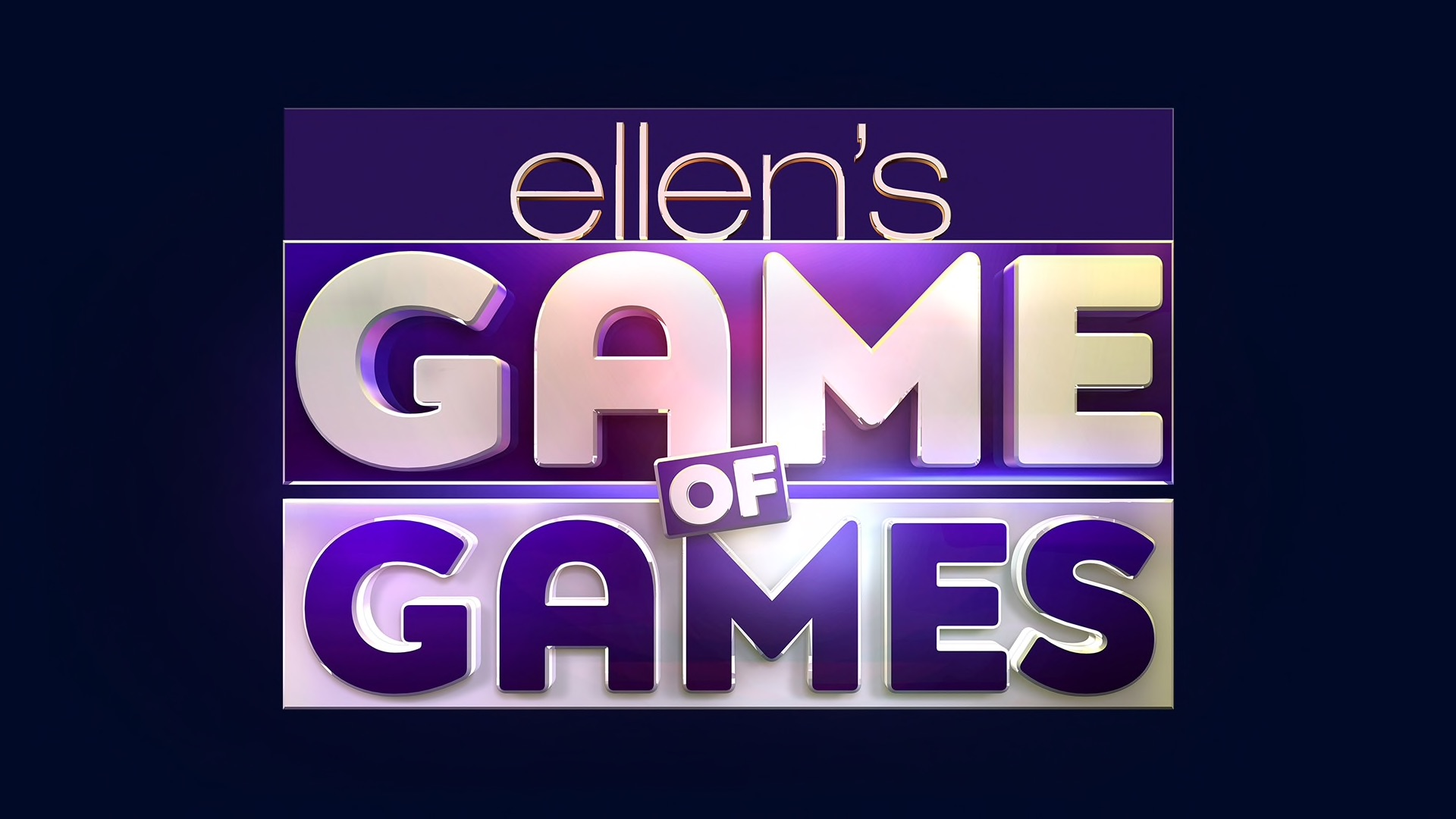
- Genre: Game show; Comedy; Family
- Created by: Kevin A. Leman II
- Developed by: Kevin A. Leman II; Mary Connelly; Ed Glavin; Andy Lassner
- Presented by: Ellen DeGeneres
- Narrated by: Stephen "tWitch" Boss
- Country of origin: United States
- Original language: English
- No. of seasons: 4
- No. of episodes: 58 (list of episodes)

Production
- Executive producers: Ellen DeGeneres; Kevin A. Leman II; Mary Connelly; Ed Glavin (2017–20); Andy Lassner; Derek Westervelt; Jeff Kleeman; Noah Bonnett (2019–20); Daniel Norris (2019–20)
- Production locations: CBS Television City, Hollywood, California (season 1); Warner Bros. Studios, Burbank, California (season 2–4)
- Production companies: A Very Good Production; Telepictures; Warner Horizon Unscripted Television (Note: Known as Warner Horizon Television until 2020)

Original release
- Network: NBC
- Release: December 18, 2017 – May 23, 2021

Related
- The Ellen Show; The Ellen DeGeneres Show; Ellen's Design Challenge; Ellen's Next Great Designer

Ellen's Game of Games, also known as Game of Games and stylized as ellen's GAME OF GAMES, is an American television game show that aired on NBC. In March 2017, NBC ordered six (later eight) hour-long episodes of the series. Ellen DeGeneres serves as host, while Stephen "tWitch" Boss appears as announcer/sidekick. The series is based on game segments from DeGeneres' daytime talk show, The Ellen DeGeneres Show. The series premiered on December 18, 2017. It ran for 4 seasons and ended on May 23, 2021. The series was cancelled in January 2022.

== Format ==
In each episode, contestants will be selected to play in one of four preliminary games. The winner of each game advances to the semi-final round, "Know or Go". The last remaining player plays the "Hot Hands/Hotter Hands" game for a chance to win up to $100,000.

Timeline
Game	Appears			
Game	Season 1	Season 2	Season 3	Season 4
Aw Snap!	Yes	Yes	Yes	Yes
Blindfolded Musical Chairs	Yes	Yes	Yes	Yes
Buckin' Blasters	No	No	Yes	Yes
Burst of Knowledge	No	No	No	Yes
Danger Word	Yes	Yes	Yes	Yes
Dirty Laundry	No	No	Yes	No
Dizzy Dash	Yes	Yes	Yes	Yes
Don't Leave Me Hanging	Yes	Yes	Yes	Yes
Great Taj Mah Wall	No	No	Yes	Yes
Heads Up!	No	No	No	Yes
Hot Hands	Yes	Yes	Yes	No
Hotter Hands	No	No	No	Yes
If I Could Turn Back Slime	No	No	No	Yes
In Your Face, Honey	Yes	No	No	No
Knockin' Boots	No	Yes	Yes	No
Know or Go	Yes	Yes	Yes	Yes
Make It Rain!	Yes	No	No	Yes
Master Blaster	Yes	No	No	No
Mazed & Confused	No	No	Yes	Yes
Mt. Saint Ellen	No	Yes	Yes	Yes
Name Dropper	No	No	No	Yes
Oh Ship!	No	Yes	Yes	Yes
One-Eyed Monster	Yes	Yes	No	No
Runaway Bride	No	No	Yes	No
Say Whaaat?	Yes	Yes	Yes	Yes
Scary-Go-Round	Yes	Yes	No	No
See Ya Later, Alligator	No	Yes	Yes	Yes
Son of a One-Eyed Monster	No	Yes	Yes	No
Stink Tank	No	Yes	Yes	Yes
Taste Buds	No	Yes	Yes	Yes
Tuba Toothpaste	Yes	No	No	No
You Bet Your Wife	Yes	Yes	Yes	Yes

=== Preliminary games ===
Some games are (or have been) played with teams of civilian contestants; for all such games, the winning team chooses one player who will play Know or Go.

- Aw Snap!: Standing back-to-back, two contestants are connected to opposite ends of a bungee cord and must each attempt to retrieve five apples in their assigned colors (red or green) from a row of stands in front of them. They may only use their teeth to hold the apples. The first contestant to move all five apples into a scoring basket wins. In Season 2, Episode 12, the game was played in teams of twin sisters, but only one twin played while the other was watching. To date, all contestants in this game have been female.
- Blindfolded Musical Chairs: Five contestants (four in Season 3-4) are blindfolded and begin dancing around the stage while music plays; when it stops, they must find and sit on one of several randomly placed stools. DeGeneres presses a button to determine where the stools will appear. As in the game of musical chairs, the number of seats is always one less than the number of participants at any given time, and the one who is unable to find an unoccupied seat is eliminated. The last remaining contestant wins. And in the Christmas special, this game is also known as Blindfolded Musical Packages.
- Buckin' Blasters: Two contestants mount giant cannons and must shoot their opponent's three portraits to win. While the contestants' control when to fire the cannon, DeGeneres will control the cannons from her podium to mess with their aiming ability. When a contestant's portrait is hit, their cannon will spin like crazy. The first contestant who shoots all three of their opponent's portraits wins. If time runs out, the contestant who shoots more of their opponent's portraits wins. If there is a tie, a sudden death round is played, in which the portraits are reset, and the first contestant to shoot one of their opponent's portraits wins. To date, all contestants in this game have been female.
- Burst of Knowledge: In this game, which was only in Season 4 to date, three contestants stand around a triangular platform. One contestant at a time answers questions while standing over a slowly inflating balloon filled with shaving cream; a correct answer ends their turn and allows them to pass the balloon to the next person in line. When the balloon pops, the contestant holding it is sprayed with the contents and eliminated. The remaining two plays again, and the last remaining contestant wins.
- Danger Word: Similar to the game show Password, played with two teams of two. A clue giver on each team is shown a "winning word" (for example, "lettuce") and a related "danger word" (for example, "salad"); they alternate giving one-word clues to their partners. A team earns a strike (and the guesser a spray from a cannon) if they guess the danger word or their opponent guesses the winning word. A team also receives a strike if the clue giver gives an illegal clue (such as a two-word clue or using any form of either word). A team with three strikes is eliminated. In Season 3, Episode 1, and Season 4, Episode 19, DeGeneres and Boss act as clue givers for two audience members. DeGeneres once declared Danger Word was her favorite game.
- Dirty Laundry: In this game, which was only in Season 3 to date, two teams of two are conjoined inside of a huge shirt and are given three clues to what DeGeneres is describing. The teams then must grab their colour corresponding ball and throw it into the giant washing machine. The first team to do so gets the choice of either answering the question or passing it to the other team. The first team that gets three points wins the game. This game is related to The Laundry Game from Grant's Game of Games in Australia.
- Dizzy Dash: Contestants are asked a (normally easy) question. They are spun around in chairs and must run to a moving podium and grab a ball from it before they can answer. The first to correctly answer three questions wins. In the Christmas special, this game is also known as "Dizzy Dasher". However, it is most well known as "Dizzy Dash". They normally have two men for this game.
- Don't Leave Me Hanging: Three contestants are suspended in harnesses and take turns naming things that fit a given category, receiving a strike if they give an incorrect answer, repeat an answer previously given or take too long to respond. A contestant with three strikes is eliminated and launched to the top of the studio. The last remaining contestant wins.
- Great Taj Mah Wall: Slightly similar to Don't Leave Me Hanging, five contestants are strapped behind 5 walls. DeGeneres will then reveal a picture with many images for about 10 seconds. Then each player randomly take turns saying an image in the picture. A contestant who gives an incorrect answer, repeats an answer, or takes too long is eliminated and blasted through the walls. The last contestant standing wins.
- Heads Up!: In this game, which was only in Season 4 to date, two pairs of contestants are chosen. One contestant in each pair is shown a series of words on monitors above and behind their partner's head and must get their partner to guess them, scoring one point each. The giver may use verbal clues for the first 30 seconds but must only gesture for the next 60 seconds. The giver or receiver may pass as often as desired. The higher-scoring pair wins and must choose one player to advance to play Know or Go.
- If I Could Turn Back Slime: In this game which was only in Season 4 to date, three contestants are given 60 seconds to do tasks simultaneously. After completing a task, a contestant's clock stops; when a contestant's clock reaches zero, slime is poured on them and they are eliminated. Once all contestants have completed the task or had their clocks expire, the process is repeated with a new task. The game ends when only one contestant has time remaining. In case of a tie, the tied contestants are given one final task; the first contestant to complete it wins.
- In Your Face, Honey: In this game, which was only in the inaugural season, two teams of couples compete. The wife from their team attempts to throw a ball as close to a target as possible. Each team have two attempts, the team with the most points wins.
- Knockin' Boots: A similar game to Don't Leave Me Hanging and also Song Association - DeGeneres, where contestants answer questions about songs with one primary word. If DeGeneres does not believe the song has the word either in the title or in the song, the contestant gets a strike. Three strikes and then they will face being kicked by the boot above them. In Season 3, the musical artists standing with DeGeneres and Boss play a game.
- Make It Rain!: Two contestants compete to answer trivia questions for the chance to pull on one of several umbrellas. In Season 1, the winning umbrella had a $10,000 cash prize; in Season 4, it had confetti and no prize; the remaining umbrellas have water. If a contestant pulls the correct umbrella on the first try, DeGeneres has them pull two or more others to get them wet, ostensibly to prove that only one umbrella had the confetti.
- Master Blaster: In this game, which was only in the inaugural season, three contestants on harnesses have to compete to solve a giant jigsaw-style puzzle. The losing contestants are "blasted" into the air.
- Mazed & Confused: Two contestants enter a giant mirror maze, each through a color-coded entrance. They must find an orb of the same color, exit the maze through the same exit, and place the orb on a podium to win. If a contestant exits through the incorrect door, they need to go back inside and exit through their correct exit point.
- Mt. Saint Ellen: Three contestants climb a mountain that tilts and shakes, and some climbing ropes are not attached. The first contestant to collect three diamonds wins.
- Name Dropper: Slightly similar to See Ya Later Alligator and Dirty Laundry and only seen in Season 4 to date, three contestants are strapped on an indoor roller coaster, then DeGeneres reads text messages from one of her celebrity friends. The contestants have to guess who that celebrity is. If the contestant guesses correctly, they pick who to send up the track, but if they guess incorrectly, they'll get sent up the track, and if a contestant already reaches the maximum height of the ride they'll be eliminated and dropped from the top of the ride.
- Oh Ship!: Contestants are asked multiple-choice questions and race to holes corresponding to the choices. Incorrect holes spray water in the contestants' faces. The first to collect three correct answers wins.
- One-Eyed Monster: Contestants standing inside the jaws of a giant prop monster must pull the monster's removable teeth for wrong answers; one tooth will cause the jaws to close, eliminating the contestant. If the contestant answered incorrectly, they had to pull as many teeth as the margin of error. A correct answer ended the turn without pulling any teeth. In season 2, the contestant in control predicts how many of 100 audience members said yes to a survey question, and their opponent guesses whether the actual number was higher or lower (similar to the game show Card Sharks). A correct high/low guess sends the contestant in control to the jaws, while a miss sends their opponent instead. The number of teeth at stake is determined by the spin of a wheel.
- Runaway Bride: In this game, which was only in Season 3, three contestants dressed in wedding gowns run on a treadmill, attempting to catch giant slices of cake and deposit them on plates at the far end. They must avoid other food items and obstacles such as a swinging bell and spinning bars. The first to place three slices of cake on their own plate wins.
- Say Whaaat?: Played with two teams of five (two teams of four in the inaugural season), competing one at a time. All members of the team except one wear headphones with loud music. DeGeneres reveals a sentence to the remaining contestant; the message must be relayed to the entire team using lip reading, similar to Telephone/Chinese Whispers. They earn one point for each correct word from the original phrase. The team with the most points wins; in case of a tie, the teams play again.
- Scary-Go-Round: Contestants take turns moving three large balls across a series of rotating platforms while their opponent launches balls to impede them. The contestant with the fastest time wins. If the contestants finish it in the same amount of time, they must do it again. From season 2, the game is played with teams of two.
- See Ya Later, Alligator: Four contestants are shown pictograms; the first to correctly state the phrase they make up gets to eliminate an opponent. The last contestant left wins.
- Son of a One-Eyed Monster: DeGeneres reads a list of words to two contestants, and the first to buzz-in and correctly state what they have in common gets to choose one of eight giant eggs (seven in Season 3). One egg allows the contestant to win, while the others spew slime. An incorrect guess allows the opponent to hear two more words before guessing.
- Stink Tank: Similar to You Bet Your Wife, but the roles are reversed. (Those standing with DeGeneres will be providing the answers while those above the pit of slime will conduct the bidding.) In Season 3, the celebrities who are standing with DeGeneres answer.
- Taste Buds: Two teams of two are blindfolded with arms interlocked and take turns tasting food and describing it to their teammate. Whichever team can guess more items correctly in a certain amount of time chooses one member to advance to play Know or Go.
- Tuba Toothpaste: In this game, which was only in the inaugural season, answering a trivia question incorrectly requires a contestant to press up to 3 of 10 buttons that resemble tuba valves. One button blasts toothpaste into the contestant's face and eliminates them. The trivia questions are extremely difficult in order to give everyone a chance of losing.
- You Bet Your Wife: Normally played with two teams of two. One contestant is suspended in a harness above a pool of food, while their teammate on the ground acts as a bidder. The bidders bid on how many answers fitting a given topic (such as "Talk Show Hosts, Past and Present") their partner in the harness must give. When one bidder challenges, the challenged answer-giver has 30 seconds to give that many answers. The answer-giver gets dunked if they fail; their opponent is dunked if they succeed. The first team to be dunked three times loses. This game was called It's a Wonderful Wife! in the Christmas special; when played with twins, it's called You Bet Your Twin.

=== Final games ===
==== Know or Go ====
The winners of the preliminary games stand on a row of trap doors and take turns answering questions. One incorrect answer result in the candidate being eliminated from the competition and dropped through the trap door, sliding down a chute and into a foam pit hidden beneath the stage, previously wasn't public knowledge. The last candidate standing advances to Hot Hands/Hotter Hands for up to $100,000.

- For Season 1, a contestant immediately drops when they get a question wrong. The last candidate standing moves on to Hot Hands.
- For Seasons 2-3, the game shifts to "Sudden Drop" rules when only two contestants remain. If one contestant misses a question, their opponent can eliminate them by giving the correct answer. If their opponent misses as well, the game continues.
- For Season 4, the "Sudden Drop" rules are modified. DeGeneres asks each contestant a different question; if both answer correctly or both miss, a new pair of questions are played. If only one contestant answers correctly, that person advances to Hotter Hands while their opponent will be dropped. If Sudden Drop starts with the players towards the right, DeGeneres will ask the contestant a question they must get right to stay in the game. This is done to balance the number of correct answers given before sudden drop privileges are given. However, the contestants towards the right rarely survive this question.

==== Hot Hands (Seasons 1–3) ====
The contestant has 30 seconds to identify the faces of ten celebrities that fit a certain category. After identifying a celebrity, the contestant must press a button to move on to the next face. Contestants may pass if they are unsure but will need to wait three seconds until the next face appears. Contestants earn an escalating amount of money based on the number of faces they correctly identify, as shown in the table below. Correctly identifying ten celebrities earns the grand prize of $100,000. In season 2 and 3, the contestants choose their preferred category from amongst three options, where the third one is always the most specific, difficult and humorous which no one chooses.

Correct answers	1	2	3	4	5	6	7	8	9	10
Money won	$100	$1,000	$2,500	$10,000	$20,000	$30,000	$40,000	$50,000	$75,000	$100,000

==== Hotter Hands (Season 4) ====
A modified version of "Hot Hands" debuted in Season 4. The contestant has 60 seconds to answer a series of questions, each with two answer choices represented by images, and must press a button for the desired choice. Each consecutive correct answer increases the contestant's winnings, but a miss at any time requires them to start over from zero. When time runs out, the contestant wins the value of the longest chain made; a chain of seven correct answers wins the top prize of $100,000.

Correct answers	1	2	3	4	5	6	7
Money won	$1,000	$5,000	$10,000	$25,000	$50,000	$75,000	$100,000

== Episodes ==
Season	Episodes	Originally released	
Season	Episodes	First released	Last released
1	8	December 18, 2017	February 6, 2018
2	14	December 12, 2018	November 27, 2019
3	16	January 7, 2020	May 12, 2020
4	20	October 6, 2020	May 23, 2021

== International versions ==
The international rights are distributed by Warner Bros. International Television Production. All versions use longer formats (90 or 120 minutes), with 5 or 6 preliminary round games leading to two semifinals and final.

Country	Local title	Network	Host(s)	Episodes	Grand prize	Premiered/ended
Argentina	Juego de juegos	Telefe	Susana Giménez	Cancelled		
Australia	Game of Games	Network Ten	Grant Denyer	11	$50,000	October 7, 2018 – December 15, 2018
Brazil	Game dos Games	RecordTV	Rodrigo Faro	Cancelled		
Finland	Game of Games Suomi	MTV3	Aku Hirviniemi and Janne Kataja	10	€20,000	November 27, 2021 – January 29, 2022
Germany	Game of Games	Sat.1	Bülent Ceylan	6	€50,000	September 14, 2018 – October 19, 2018
Italy	Game of Games - Gioco Loco	Rai 2	Simona Ventura	6	€15,000	March 31, 2021 – June 8, 2021
Portugal	Jogo de Todos os Jogos	RTP1	Filomena Cautela	14	in the regular gameplay - motorcircle, in the grand final - Car	October 12, 2019 – January 18, 2020
Spain	Juego de juegos	Antena 3	Silvia Abril	12	€50,000	February 15, 2019 – May 3, 2019

Notes

- The Finnish version included two official hosts, rather than one. This means both hosts present whole episodes and control games together, not like on the Australian version, where Ash London helped host Denyer on some games.
