= Cliff Fong =

American fashion designer

- Born: Clifford Scott Fong; December 6, 1969 (age 56); Brooklyn, New York, U.S.
- Education: California State University, Los Angeles
- Occupations: Interior designer, television host, fashion designer
- Years active: early 1990s–present
- Website: matt blacke inc.

Cliff Fong (born December 6, 1969) is an American interior designer, fashion designer, and television personality. He is the founder of the Los Angeles interior design firm Matt Blacke Inc. In 2009 he opened show room Galerie Half on Melrose Avenue with partners. Cliff served as host, mentor and judge on Ellen's Design Challenge. He worked as a fashion buyer for Ron Herman, Fred Segal and Maxfield in Los Angeles. Later working as a stylist, consultant and fashion designer. In 2004 he co-founded Chatav Ectabit with Sandy Dalal. As a consultant, he has worked with international retailers such as Harvey Nichols, Isetan, and Joyce, Hong Kong.

== Early life and education ==
Fong was born on December 6, 1969, in Brooklyn, New York. He attended California State University, Los Angeles where he majored in art history.

== Filmography ==
- Ellen's Design Challenge (2015-2016) — Guest host in Season 1 and judge, host and mentor in Season 2

== See also ==
- Interior designer
