= List of Ellen's Game of Games episodes =

Ellen's Game of Games is an American television game show which debuted on NBC on December 18, 2017.

On January 9, 2018, NBC renewed the series for a 13-episode second season. On January 16, 2019, NBC renewed the series for a 16-episode third season. On February 18, 2020, NBC renewed the series for a 20-episode fourth season.

During the course of the series, 58 episodes of Ellen's Game of Games aired over four seasons, between December 18, 2017, and May 23, 2021. In January 2022, the series was canceled after four seasons.

Episodes with their titles in bold letters are specials. There were a total of 6 specials in the entire series.

== Series overview ==
| Season | Episodes | Originally released | |
| Season | Episodes | First released | Last released |
|---|---|---|---|
| 1 | 8 | December 18, 2017 | February 6, 2018 |
| 2 | 14 | December 12, 2018 | November 27, 2019 |
| 3 | 16 | January 7, 2020 | May 12, 2020 |
| 4 | 20 | October 6, 2020 | May 23, 2021 |

== Episodes ==
=== Season 1 (2017–2018) ===
This was the first season of Ellen's Game of Games. The show became popular across America and soon there became international versions of Game of Games. Because of its popularity, NBC soon renewed it three times up until the fourth season, where it was then sadly cancelled due to losing popularity and Host Ellen DeGeneres' toxic workplace allegations.

| No. overall | No. in season | Title | Original release date | U.S. viewers (millions) | Rating/share (18–49) |
|---|---|---|---|---|---|
| 1 | 1 | "Game of Games - Premiere" | December 18, 2017 | 7.23 | 1.7/6 |
Preliminary Games: Dizzy Dash / Tuba Toothpaste / Aw Snap! / Scary Go Round; Preliminary Game Winners: Dayo / Andrea / Jennifer / Alexa; Hot Hands: $100,000; Winner: Dayo; Game Winner Won: Dizzy Dash; Notes: This was the first ever episode of Ellen's Game of Games. Monica from the game Tuba Toothpaste returned to The Ellen DeGeneres Show for a Know or Go redemption and won. This episode marks the only time "Aw Snap!" was played this season. Dayo got his last celebrity correct 1 second before time ran out, so the judges had to check if he would win his extra money for it. It was determined that he got it correct and so he won the grand prize money.
| 2 | 2 | "I'll Have What She's Playing" | January 2, 2018 | 8.84 | 2.2/8 |
Preliminary Games: One-Eyed Monster / Blindfolded Musical Chairs / You Bet Your Wife / Master Blaster; Preliminary Game Winners: Krislyn / Jeannie / Jesse and Katrina / Stefani; Hot Hands: $100,000; Winner: Katrina; Game Winner Won: You Bet Your Wife; Notes: During blindfolded musical chairs, Ellen “accidentally” pressed a chair button right below Jeannie, causing Jeannie to be elevated before tumbling over. This was the only time this ever happened in the entire show. Jeannie appeared on Know Or Go on The Ellen Show prior to this in the same game Bianca from Season 1, Episode 5 played along with another contestant named Sandra. Jeannie was the last contestant standing but did not answer her final 3 questions correctly resulting in her elimination although she along with the other 3 won a TV.
| 3 | 3 | "Say Hello to My Little Friends" | January 2, 2018 | 8.88 | 2.4/8 |
Preliminary Games: Danger Word / Blindfolded Musical Chairs / Don't Leave Me Hanging / Say Whaaat?; Preliminary Game Winners: Jack and Joe / John / Lacey / Alana, Audrey, Valerie and Leah; Hot Hands: $75,000; Winner: Leah; Game Winner Won: Say Whaaat?; Notes: Holly from Don't Leave Me Hanging returned to The Ellen DeGeneres Show for a Know or Go redemption. Kerri from Danger Word also did. (But not on the same episode.)
| 4 | 4 | "Hasta la Vista, Honey!" | January 9, 2018 | 7.87 | 2.1/8 |
Preliminary Games: Blindfolded Musical Chairs / Don't Leave Me Hanging / Make It Rain! / In Your Face Honey; Preliminary Game Winners: Jade / Shonell / Gayle / Zach and Rachel; Hot Hands: $110,000; Winner: Gayle; Game Winner Won: Make it Rain!; Game Winner Won: Gayle from Make it Rain! won an automatic $10,000 after pulling the correct umbrella on the first try. Gayle also won the most money ever on Ellen's Game of Games with a total of $110,000 since she also ended up winning the grand prize on Hot Hands after winning Know or Go.
| 5 | 5 | "Just Keep Spinning" | January 16, 2018 | 8.78 | 2.2/8 |
Preliminary Games: You Bet Your Wife / Dizzy Dash / One-Eyed Monster / Scary Go Round; Preliminary Game Winners: Bill and Amy / Jessica / Kristen / Monica; Hot Hands: $100,000; Winner: Amy; Game Winner Won: You Bet Your Wife; Notes: Bill was the first ever contestant to have a different category rather than celebrities. He instead had animated characters. Bianca from One-Eyed Monster appeared on the Ellen show to play Know or Go prior to this along with Jeannie from Season 1, Episode 2 and another contestant named Sandra. Bianca was the first to be dropped in this game although she did win a TV.
| 6 | 6 | "You Can't Handle the Toothpaste" | January 23, 2018 | 7.57 | 1.8/7 |
Preliminary Games: Dizzy Dash / In Your Face Honey / Tuba Toothpaste / Master Blaster; Preliminary Game Winners: Bonnie / Rosalyn / Jamie / Tommy; Hot Hands: $100,000; Winner: Jamie; Game Winner Won: Tuba Toothpaste; Notes: Stevie from the game Master Blaster returned to The Ellen DeGeneres Show for a Know or Go redemption and won.
| 7 | 7 | "Ellen, We Have a Problem" | January 30, 2018 | 7.58 | 1.8/7 |
Preliminary Games: You Bet Your Wife / Blindfolded Musical Chairs / Say Whaaat? / Make It Rain!; Preliminary Game Winners: Shane and Jenny / Kelly / Nicky, Chelsea, Kalli, and Stacie / Alwyne; Hot Hands: $100.000; Winner: Jenny; Game Winner Won: You Bet Your Wife; Notes: Due to low winnings, Stacie was invited to The Ellen DeGeneres Show to redeem herself and try to win $10,000 but had most of her answers just Ellen DeGeneres. Vivien from Blindfolded musical Chairs was also invited to The Ellen DeGeneres Show for a Know or Go redemption. Alwyne won $10,000 from Make it Rain!
| 8 | 8 | "I See Dizzy People" | February 6, 2018 | 7.70 | 1.9/7 |
Preliminary Games: Danger Word / One-Eyed Monster / Scary Go Round / Don't Leave Me Hanging; Preliminary Game Winners: Jordan and Nathalie / Terry / Noveen / Chad; Hot Hands: $10,000; Winner: Chad; Game Winner Won: Don’t Leave Me Hanging; Notes: Chad won Don't Leave Me Hanging with no strikes whatsoever.

=== Season 2 (2018–2019) ===
This season added a new element to Know or Go called "Sudden Drop". In Sudden Drop, instead of a contestant being immediately eliminated due to an incorrect answer, their opponent would have to correctly answer their failed question to win. If both contestants were to get the answer wrong, the game would simply go on like normal until a winner was determined.

| No. overall | No. in season | Title | Original release date | U.S. viewers (millions) | Rating/share (18–49) |
|---|---|---|---|---|---|
| 9 | 1 | "Game of Games Holiday Spectacular" | December 12, 2018 | 5.94 | 1.2/5 |
Preliminary Games: It's a Wonderful Wife / Danger Word (Christmas Edition) / Blindfolded Musical Packages / Dizzy Dasher; Preliminary Game Winners: Sam and Dianna / Barb and Ryan / Omid / Amber; Hot Hands: $100,000; Winner: Dianna; Game Winner Won: It’s a Wonderful Wife; Notes: This episode was Christmas themed. All the games played in the episode were temporarily renamed to Christmas-like names and the entire studio was decorated to fit the Christmas theme. Know or Go was renamed to “Know or Go-Ho-Ho”. There was also a cash prize for a lucky person in the audience that was chose at random for Ellen's 12 days of Christmas, but it is unknown who won it.
| 10 | 2 | "The Stink Tank Strikes Back" | January 8, 2019 | 6.53 | 1.5/6 |
Preliminary Games: Stink Tank / Blindfolded Musical Chairs / Oh Ship! / Knockin' Boots; Preliminary Game Winners: Nikki and Ingrid / Danielle / Joshua / Lori; Hot Hands: $100,000; Winner: Ingrid; Game Winner Won: Stink Tank; Notes: Lori returned to The Ellen DeGeneres Show as she was one of DeGeneres' favorite and funniest contestants on Game of Games to play Danger Word.
| 11 | 3 | "Parent Snapped" | January 15, 2019 | 6.35 | 1.7/8 |
Preliminary Games: Aw Snap! / You Bet Your Wife / Mt. Saint Ellen / See Ya Later, Alligator; Preliminary Game Winners: Bailey / Andrew and Kacie / Bryce / Steven; Hot Hands: $2,500; Winner: Steven; Game Winner Won: See Ya Later, Alligator
| 12 | 4 | "Air Force One-Eyed Monster" | January 22, 2019 | 7.46 | 1.6/7 |
Preliminary Games: Don't Leave Me Hanging / Aw Snap! / Oh Ship! / One-Eyed Monster; Preliminary Game Winners: Khristina / Haley / Ron / Kristine; Hot Hands: $75,000; Winner: Ron; Game Winner Won: Oh Ship!; Notes: Ron returned to The Ellen DeGeneres Show as he was also one of DeGeneres' favorite and funniest contestants on Game of Games to play Danger Word.
| 13 | 5 | "The Sound of Musical Chairs" | January 29, 2019 | 7.05 | 1.6/7 |
Preliminary Games: Blindfolded Musical Chairs / You Bet Your Wife / Mt. Saint Ellen / Dizzy Dash; Preliminary Game Winners: Anna / Damien and Alicia / Jessica / Eileen; Hot Hands: $40,000; Winner: Jessica; Game Winner Won: Mt. Saint Ellen; Notes: If Know or Go had gone according to Season 1 rules, Damien would have won.
| 14 | 6 | "One-Eyed Monster's Inc." | January 29, 2019 | 6.98 | 1.7/7 |
Preliminary Games: Blindfolded Musical Chairs / Son of a One-Eyed Monster / Taste Buds / Scary Go Round; Preliminary Game Winners: Brittnei / Shermariya / Tori and Berkley / Crystal and Raquel; Hot Hands: $40,000; Winner: Berkley; Game Winner Won: Taste Buds; Notes: Berkley is the only Taste Buds winner to bring her dress from the game up onto Know or Go.
| 15 | 7 | "Life as We Know or Go It" | February 5, 2019 | 6.31 | 1.4/7 |
Preliminary Games: Danger Word / Mt. Saint Ellen / See Ya Later, Alligator / Aw Snap!; Preliminary Game Winners: Mark and Maurice / Margie / Sarah / Natasha; Hot Hands: $100,000; Winner: Sarah; Game Winner Won: See Ya Later, Alligator; Notes: Mark returned to The Ellen Show because he had the question of what a pie hole was. He answered that it was a butthole and because of this, he lost in Sudden Drop. However, Ellen said that (on The Ellen Show) that if he could name 10 different words or synonyms for butt that he would win $10,000, and he ended up winning that money. Also no player said any danger words in this episode but only winning words.
| 16 | 8 | "Gone With The Win" | February 12, 2019 | 6.01 | 1.5/6 |
Preliminary Games: Son of a One-Eyed Monster / You Bet Your Wife / Say Whaaat? / Mt. Saint Ellen; Preliminary Game Winners: Paige / Rhett and Terri / Brenna, Ryan, Trevor, Chloe, and Chase / Michael; Hot Hands: $75,000; Winner: Terri; Game Winner Won: You Bet Your Wife; Notes: Brenna and her team on Say Whaaat? won the most ever points won on Say Whaaat? (not counting tiebreakers) with a total of 6 points.
| 17 | 9 | "Danger Word War Z" | February 19, 2019 | 6.11 | 1.4/6 |
Preliminary Games: Dizzy Dash / Knockin' Boots / Danger Word / Blindfolded Musical Chairs; Preliminary Game Winners: Bryson / Kelly / Stephen & Michael / Pam; Hot Hands: $75,000; Winner: Pam; Game Winner Won: Blindfolded Musical Chairs
| 18 | 10 | "Beauty and the Boots" | March 12, 2019 | 5.27 | 1.2/6 |
Preliminary Games: Stink Tank / Taste Buds / Knockin' Boots / Scary Go Around; Preliminary Game Winners: Eddie and Aleigha / Christine and Helen / Jenny / Allen and Megan; Hot Hands: $100,000; Winner: Aleigha; Game Winner Won: Stink Tank
| 19 | 11 | "Oh Shipwrecked" | March 19, 2019 | 5.69 | 1.2/6 |
Preliminary Games: Danger Word / Oh Ship! / Mt. Saint Ellen / Don't Leave Me Hanging; Preliminary Game Winners: Austin and Jessica / Jack / Kelsey / Steven; Hot Hands: $2,500; Winner: Steven; Game Winner Won: Don't Leave Me Hanging
| 20 | 12 | "Some Like It Hot Hands" | March 26, 2019 | 5.41 | 1.2/6 |
Preliminary Games: Stink Tank / Aw Snap! / One-Eyed Monster / Don't Leave Me Hanging; Preliminary Game Winners: Ally and Ashlee / Shelvia / Leslie / Elizabeth; Hot Hands: $100,000; Winner: Shelvia; Game Winner Won: Aw Snap!; Notes: Aw Snap! was played in teams of twin sisters, but only one twin played while the other one watched from the sidelines, despite both twin sisters being introduce themselves for the game.
| 21 | 13 | "Say Whaat Women Want" | April 2, 2019 | 5.26 | 1.2/5 |
Preliminary Games: Dizzy Dash / Stink Tank / Say Whaaat? / See Ya Later, Alligator; Preliminary Game Winners: Rashad / Casey and Kirsten / Heidi, Anderiana, Jasmin, Heather (#1) & Heather (#2) / Thomas; Hot Hands: $2,500; Winner: Thomas; Game Winner Won: See Ya Later, Alligator
| 22 | 14 | "The Good Son of a Monster" | November 27, 2019 | 4.01 | 0.7/4 |
Preliminary Games: Dizzy Dash / Son of a One-Eyed Monster / You Bet Your Wife / Blindfolded Musical Chairs; Preliminary Game Winners: Jenny / Delisa / Alexandra and Chris / Devin; Hot Hands: $100,000; Winner: Chris; Game Winner Won: You Bet Your Wife; Notes: Delisa returned to The Ellen DeGeneres Show as she was also one of DeGeneres' favorite and funniest contestants on Game of Games to play Danger Word. On Know or Go, she had the Sudden Drop question, "If a man or woman says they have 'FOMO', what do they mean?" and answering back, she said, "When we say 'F.O.M.O.' we are asking if we can have four more." This episode was aired one day before the Macy's Thanksgiving parade, and was called "The Thanksgiving Special" in some of the promos for the episode.

=== Season 3 (2020) ===
In Season 3, host Ellen DeGeneres would invite celebrity guests. These guests would either co-host in Knockin' Boots or they would play with regular contestants in Stink Tank (Of course, the contestants would be the ones in the dunking position).

| No. overall | No. in season | Title | Original release date | Guest(s) | U.S. viewers (millions) | Rating/share (18–49) |
|---|---|---|---|---|---|---|
| 23 | 1 | "It's Been a Hard Maze Night" | January 7, 2020 | N/A | 4.34 | 1.0/5 |
Preliminary Games: Danger Word / Blindfolded Musical Chairs / Mazed & Confused / Don't Leave Me Hanging; Preliminary Game Winners: Ellen and Marilyn / Heather / Candice / Marcia; Hot Hands: $100,000; Winner: Heather; Game Winner Won: Blindfolded Musical Chairs; Notes: Host Ellen DeGeneres and announcer Stephen "tWitch" Boss partnered with the two contestants for Danger Word.
| 24 | 2 | "So Put Another Coin in the Blaster Baby" | January 7, 2020 | Chrissy Teigen and Amanda Seales | 4.67 | 1.1/5 |
Preliminary Games: Stink Tank / Dirty Laundry / Buckin' Blasters / See Ya Later, Alligator; Preliminary Game Winners: Amanda and Andrea / Dallas and Grant / Jenny / May-Lin; Hot Hands: $75,000; Winner: Dallas; Game Winner Won: Dirty Laundry; Notes: If Know or Go had gone according to Season 4 rules, Andrea would have won.
| 25 | 3 | "Hit Me Baby One More Slime" | January 14, 2020 | N/A | 4.23 | 1.0/5 |
Preliminary Games: Dizzy Dash / Son of a One-Eyed Monster / Runaway Bride / Blindfolded Musical Chairs; Preliminary Game Winners: Ryan / Kathy / Samantha / Kyle; Hot Hands: $2,500; Winner: Kathy; Game Winner Won: Son of a One-Eyed Monster; Notes: Kathy won Son of a One-Eyed Monster without letting her opponent get a chance to get any of the categories correct. Kathy also faced off Samantha in one of the longest Sudden Drop rounds. If Know or Go had gone according to Season 4 rules, Kathy would still have won, but quicker.
| 26 | 4 | "Highway to the Danger Word" | January 21, 2020 | N/A | 4.70 | 1.0/5 |
Preliminary Games: Dizzy Dash / Runaway Bride / Blindfolded Musical Chairs / Danger Word; Preliminary Game Winners: Alex / Leann / Kelton / Jenna and Paige; Hot Hands: $100,000; Winner: Alex; Game Winner Won: Dizzy Dash
| 27 | 5 | "Another One Bites the Crust" | January 28, 2020 | N/A | 4.87 | 1.0/5 |
Preliminary Games: Danger Word / Mazed & Confused / Taste Buds / You Bet Your Twin; Preliminary Game Winners: Allison and Margaret / Dawaun and Tawaun / Natasha and Olivia / Marla and Marcia; Hot Hands: $40,000; Winner: Marcia; Game Winner Won: You Bet Your Twin; Notes: This was a special episode where 2 twins worked together to try to win the games together against other pairs of twins. This episode also offered a grand prize of $200,000 instead of a regular $100,000 so the twins could split their winnings. This is also the only time Mazed and Confused was played in pairs. You Bet Your Wife was temporarily renamed to "You Bet Your Twin". If the prize money was like a normal episode, Marla would've only won $20,000.
| 28 | 6 | "Ain't No Mt. Saint Ellen High Enough" | February 4, 2020 | N/A | 4.84 | 1.0 |
Preliminary Games: Buckin' Blasters / Mt. Saint Ellen / See Ya Later, Alligator / Aw Snap!; Preliminary Game Winners: Jessica (#1) / Brooklin / Jessica (#2) / Abby; Hot Hands: $100,000; Winner: Abby; Game Winner Won: Aw Snap!; Notes: This is the first and only episode where 2 different people who had the same first name advanced onto Know or Go. Eddie from See Ya Later, Alligator got the first 2 pictograms correct, but in a twist of events, Jessica (#2) beat him in the final round.
| 29 | 7 | "Girls Just Wanna Have Pudding" | February 11, 2020 | N/A | 4.53 | 0.9 |
Preliminary Games: You Bet Your Wife / Oh Ship! / Danger Word / Say Whaaat?; Preliminary Game Winners: Sarah and Dillon / Quinton / William and Brian / Jasmine, Dominique, Brittany, Alanna, and Linda; Hot Hands: $75,000; Winner: Quinton; Game Winner Won: Oh Ship!
| 30 | 8 | "I Fell Into a Burning Ring of Bubbles" | February 18, 2020 | N/A | 4.57 | 1.0 |
Preliminary Games: Mt. Saint Ellen / You Bet Your Wife / Dirty Laundry / See Ya Later, Alligator; Preliminary Game Winners: Francis / Andre and Yaji / Kassidy & Sommer / Kayci; Hot Hands: $100,000; Winner: Kayci; Game Winner Won: See Ya Later, Alligator
| 31 | 9 | "Party in the Goo. S. A." | March 10, 2020 | Jeff Foxworthy and Kenan Thompson | 4.37 | 0.9 |
Preliminary Games: Aw Snap! / Stink Tank / Don't Leave Me Hanging / Runaway Bride; Preliminary Game Winners: Ashley / Anthony And Jeff / Misty / Cody; Hot Hands: $100,000; Winner: Ashley; Game Winner Won: Aw Snap; Notes: Ashley has the record Highest Hot Hands winnings only getting all correct beating the then record of $100,000 which had been set several times previously.
| 32 | 10 | "Another Brick in the Taj Mah Wall" | March 17, 2020 | N/A | 5.64 | 1.3 |
Preliminary Games: Dirty Laundry / You Bet Your Wife / Mt. Saint Ellen / Great Taj Mah Wall; Preliminary Game Winners: Milos and Elise / Jared and Sophia / Kala / Allen; Hot Hands: $75,000; Winner: Elise; Game Winner Won: Dirty Laundry
| 33 | 11 | "Bye Bye Ms. American Pumpkin Pie" | March 24, 2020 | Halsey and Charlie Puth | 6.29 | 1.4 |
Preliminary Games: Stink Tank / Buckin' Blasters / Don't Leave Me Hanging / Taste Buds; Preliminary Game Winners: Halsey and Shayna / Kerri / John / Nick and Khalil; Hot Hands: $100,000; Winner: John; Game Winner Won: Don't Leave Me Hanging
| 34 | 12 | "I Will Always Love Goo" | April 7, 2020 | Matt Iseman and Akbar Gbajabiamila | 5.28 | 1.2 |
Preliminary Games: Great Taj Mah Wall / Stink Tank / Say Whaaat? / Oh Ship!; Preliminary Game Winners: Maranda / Sha'Terria and Matt / Josh, Lenora, Lorraine, Kiana, Jaylene / Jazmine; Hot Hands: $20,000; Winner: Maranda; Game Winner Won: Great Taj Mah Wall
| 35 | 13 | "Life in the Blast Lane" | April 14, 2020 | N/A | 4.87 | 1.0 |
Preliminary Games: Oh Ship! / Son of a One-Eyed Monster / Taste Buds / Buckin' Blasters; Preliminary Game Winners: John / Ashley / Kristine and Ting / Ann; Hot Hands: $100,000; Winner: Ting; Game Winner Won: Taste Buds; Notes: John won Oh Ship! with 3 consecutive points while his competitors got 0 points each. During Buckin' Blasters, there was a tie since neither competitors could shoot their opponent's 3rd target before time ran out. The targets were then reset and whoever shot any of the 3 of their opponent's targets first would become the winner.
| 36 | 14 | "Sweet Foam Alabama" | April 28, 2020 | Usher | 4.31 | 0.9 |
Preliminary Games: Knockin' Boots / Aw Snap! / Oh Ship! / Runaway Bride; Preliminary Game Winners: Dwight / Taryn / Lisa / Chandler; Hot Hands: $2,500; Winner: Lisa; Game Winner Won: Oh Ship!
| 37 | 15 | "My Heart Will Know or Go On" | May 5, 2020 | N/A | 4.07 | 0.8 |
Preliminary Games: Aw Snap! / Dizzy Dash / Great Taj Mah Wall / Blindfolded Musical Chairs; Preliminary Game Winners: Breeauna / Nick / Raquel / Terrance; Hot Hands: $100,000; Winner: Raquel; Game Winner Won: Great Taj Mah Wall; Notes: If Know or Go had gone according to Season 4 rules, Raquel would've won. Breeauna set a record fastest time in Aw Snap.
| 38 | 16 | "Do You Believe in Life After Suds?" | May 12, 2020 | Meghan Trainor | 3.99 | 0.8 |
Preliminary Games: Mazed & Confused / Dirty Laundry / Say Whaaat? / Knockin' Boots; Preliminary Game Winners: Shai / Zach and Anna / Robin, Renee (#1), Candace, Renee (#2), Carrie / Caprice; Hot Hands: $50,000; Winner: Renee; Game Winner Won: Say Whaaat?; Notes: After Say Whaaat? the two teams were tied, so they each picked one person to represent their team and they had to try to say what Ellen had said to them on another card out loud with headphones. The person who won that determined the winning team. Also, this episode was originally scheduled to air on March 3, 2020.

=== Season 4 (2020–2021) ===
Due to season four being filmed during the COVID-19 pandemic, there were no longer celebrity guests nor an actual audience. So, the "audience" was instead canned. Season four also marked the start of Hotter Hands: A multiple choice answer game that replaced the original Hot Hands. In this season, Sudden Drop was only implemented when a contestant missed a question and the contestant to the right of them was still in the game. Otherwise (if they are the contestant on the right), they would be immediately dropped. This new system was meant to balance out the amount of correct and incorrect answers between the contestants to make the game more fair.

| No. overall | No. in season | Title | Original release date | U.S. viewers (millions) | Rating (18–49) |
|---|---|---|---|---|---|
| 39 | 1 | "Drop Goes the Loser" | October 6, 2020 | 3.46 | 0.7 |
Preliminary Games: Oh Ship! / Dizzy Dash / Blindfolded Musical Chairs / Name Dropper; Preliminary Game Winners: Rita / Matthew / Joe / Shelby; Hotter Hands: $100,000; Winner: Mathew; Game Winner Won: Dizzy Dash
| 40 | 2 | "Tanks for the Memories" | October 13, 2020 | 2.86 | 0.5 |
Preliminary Games: Stink Tank / Mazed & Confused / Great Taj Mah Wall / Burst of Knowledge; Preliminary Game Winners: Renae and Clayton / Heather / Laurel / Riley; Hotter Hands: $100,000; Winner: Clayton; Game Winner Won: Stink Tank
| 41 | 3 | "Slime Every Mountain" | January 4, 2021 | 3.37 | 0.7 |
Preliminary Games: Stink Tank / Mt. Saint Ellen / If I Could Turn Back Slime / Name Dropper; Preliminary Game Winners: Vickie and Jane / Cabria / Malik / Molly; Hotter Hands: $100,000; Winner: Malik; Game Winner Won: If I Can Turn Back The Slime
| 42 | 4 | "I'm King of the Twirl" | January 4, 2021 | 2.87 | 0.6 |
Preliminary Games: Danger Word / Aw Snap! / Heads Up! / Dizzy Dash; Preliminary Game Winners: Tyria and David "Dave-O" / Aschli / Dilafruz and Nigina / Israel; Hotter Hands: $25,000; Winner: Aschli; Game Winner Won: Aw Snap!
| 43 | 5 | "Aw Snap Out of It" | January 11, 2021 | 3.14 | 0.6 |
Preliminary Games: Oh Ship! / Aw Snap! / Say Whaaat? / Taste Buds; Preliminary Game Winners: Lauren / Janae / Jacki, Patricia, Judith, Joanne, and Rebecca / Bri and Hannah; Hotter Hands: $75,000; Winner: Judith; Game Winner Won: Say Whaaat?
| 44 | 6 | "Dash Test Dummies" | January 18, 2021 | 3.23 | 0.7 |
Preliminary Games: Buckin' Blasters / Heads Up! / Aw Snap! / Dizzy Dash; Preliminary Game Winners: Lexi / Joseph and Makenna / Kayla / Emmanuelle; Hotter Hands: $100,000; Winner: Emmanuelle; Game Winner Won: Dizzy Dash; Notes: Emmanuelle got all of his Hotter Hands questions correct in one consecutive row.
| 45 | 7 | "You Heard It Here Burst" | January 25, 2021 | 3.38 | 0.7 |
Preliminary Games: Burst of Knowledge / Stink Tank / Mazed & Confused / Great Taj Mah Wall; Preliminary Game Winners: Teresa / Jennie and Camryn / Erika / Reed; Hotter Hands: $75,000; Winner: Jennie; Game Winner Won: Stink Tank; Notes: The contestants partnered with their children for Stink Tank. (The parent moved on to Know or Go)
| 46 | 8 | "That Oh Ship Has Sailed" | February 1, 2021 | 3.34 | 0.6 |
Preliminary Games: Oh Ship! / Danger Word / Blindfolded Musical Chairs / Name Dropper; Preliminary Game Winners: Craig / Nia and Jason / Christine / Gazmine; Hotter Hands: $100,000; Winner: Craig; Game Winner Won: Oh Ship; Notes: Craig made a virtual appearance on The Ellen Show for a Hotter Hands redemption. He ended up winning $25,000.
| 47 | 9 | "It Takes Three to Dangle" | February 8, 2021 | 3.04 | 0.6 |
Preliminary Games: Don't Leave Me Hanging / Say Whaaat? / Mt. Saint Ellen / Make It Rain!; Preliminary Game Winners: Remy / Ahmad, Khalil, Malik, Kimberly, and Aaron / Yoselin "Yosi" / Tracy; Hotter Hands: $75,000; Winner: Yosi; Game Winner Won: Mt. Saint Ellen; Notes: Unlike in the first season, on Make it Rain, there is no cash prize. Instead, the winning umbrella has confetti. Percilla from Don't Leave Me Hanging got eliminated before either one of her opponents got a strike.
| 48 | 10 | "A Picture Is Worth 1,000 Danger Words" | February 15, 2021 | 3.28 | 0.7 |
Preliminary Games: Danger Word / Oh Ship! / Name Dropper / Blindfolded Musical Chairs; Preliminary Game Winners: Joe Jr. (Joe) and Joe Sr. / Mary / Stacie / Jaime; Hotter Hands: $100,000; Winner: Stacie; Game Winner Won: Name Dropper
| 49 | 11 | "Aw Snap, Crackle, Slop" | February 22, 2021 | 3.09 | 0.6 |
Preliminary Games: Dizzy Dash / Aw Snap! / Mt. Saint Ellen / If I Could Turn Back Slime; Preliminary Game Winners: Bryan / Maya / Caroline / Ashley; Hotter Hands: $75,000; Winner: Bryan; Game Winner Won: Dizzy Dash; Notes: Caroline won Mt. Saint Ellen by luckily having all her diamonds drop down on the first trip to the top of the mountain.
| 50 | 12 | "If You're Not First, You're Blast" | February 22, 2021 | 2.79 | 0.7 |
Preliminary Games: Buckin' Blasters / Don't Leave Me Hanging / Make It Rain! / Say Whaaat?; Preliminary Game Winners: Lindsey / Shelby / Giovanna / CeCe, Jose, Denise, Tiffany, and Elaine; Hotter Hands: $10,000; Winner: Lindsey; Game Winner Won: Buckin’ Blasters; Notes: Shelby and Lindsey had the longest round of Sudden Drop, and both of them answered hard questions correctly. Ellen even commented that both Shelby and Lindsey were smart ladies. The winning music started playing before Shelby even dropped.
| 51 | 13 | "All I Do Is Twin" | March 7, 2021 | 1.50 | 0.3 |
Preliminary Games: You Bet Your Twin / Taste Buds / Danger Word / Heads Up!; Preliminary Game Winners: Heather and Hillary / Joe and Sean / Thomine and Josefine / Kaitlyn and Hannah; Hotter Hands: $5,000; Winner: Kaitlyn; Game Winner Won: Heads Up!; Notes: Like in Season 3, Episode 5, this episode was all about twins in the games, however, this time, there was no possible $200,000 grand prize, and instead, it the prize was the same amount as a normal episode’s prize. Yet again, You Bet Your Wife was once again temporarily renamed to "You Bet Your Twin". Heads Up replaced Mazed and Confused from the last twins special because it is a 2 player game:
| 52 | 14 | "Fake It 'Til You Make It Rain" | March 14, 2021 | 1.76 | 0.3 |
Preliminary Games: Blindfolded Musical Chairs / Buckin' Blasters / See Ya Later, Alligator / Make It Rain!; Preliminary Game Winners: Helen / Sarah / Laura / Michael; Hotter Hands: $100,000; Winner: Helen; Game Winner Won: Blindfolded Musical Chairs
| 53 | 15 | "Get Dizzy With It" | March 21, 2021 | 1.67 | 0.3 |
Preliminary Games: Oh Ship! / Dizzy Dash / If I Could Turn Back Slime / Mt. Saint Ellen; Preliminary Game Winners: Diandra / Dan / London / Jon; Hotter Hands: $25,000; Winner: Dan; Game Winner Won: Dizzy Dash; Notes: Diandra made a comeback in Oh Ship. After the third question Diandra had 0 points to her opponents 2 and 1 point respectively. She managed to get the next 3 questions correct winning her the game. In If I Could Turn back Slime, there was a tie, so the contestants needed to do a tiebreaker challenge. Whoever completed if first would win.
| 54 | 16 | "Peaky Blindfolds" | March 28, 2021 | 1.68 | 0.3 |
Preliminary Games: Stink Tank / Blindfolded Musical Chairs / See Ya Later, Alligator / Heads Up!; Preliminary Game Winners: Christine and Ryan / Rebecca / Erin / Cody and Melissa; Hotter Hands: $100,000; Winner: Rebecca; Game Winner Won: Blindfolded Musical Chairs
| 55 | 17 | "Burst of Knowledge Is Power" | April 4, 2021 | 1.79 | 0.3 |
Preliminary Games: Buckin' Blasters / Don't Leave Me Hanging / Burst of Knowledge / Say Whaaat?; Preliminary Game Winners: Raro / Kellie / Juanita / Karen, Kathryn, Harrison, Katelyn, Craig; Hotter Hands: $75,000; Winner: Kellie; Game Winner Won: Don’t Leave Me Hanging; Notes: This episode's Hot Hands game was the last video to be posted on the official Ellen's Game of Games YouTube channel. Blake from Don't Leave Me Hanging had to have his answer verified with the judges, and his answer was ruled as invalid. This episode had the record shortest Know Or Go round. Kellie only got 1 answer correct in Know Or Go but won based on the fact she had the first question asked and her three opponents all missed the next three questions.
| 56 | 18 | "Wife of the Party" | May 2, 2021 | 1.85 | 0.4 |
Preliminary Games: Danger Word / Name Dropper / Blindfolded Musical Chairs / You Bet Your Wife; Preliminary Game Winners: Ryan & Allie / Alex / Lisa / Michael & Chantea; Hotter Hands: $75,000; Winner: Ryan; Game Winner Won: Danger Word; Notes: This episode marks the first (and only) time that a lesbian couple competed in You Bet Your Wife.
| 57 | 19 | "Danger's My Middle Game" | May 16, 2021 | 1.79 | 0.3 |
Preliminary Games: Taste Buds / You Bet Your Wife / Danger Word / Heads Up!; Preliminary Game Winners: Karen and tWitch / Tabitha and Ellen / Mark and tWitch / Stephanie and Ellen; Hotter Hands: $10,000; Winner: Mark; Game Winner Won: Danger Word; Notes: This episode marks the first time where host DeGeneres and announcer boss compete against each other in every game except for the final ones. The contestants are assigned either DeGeneres or Boss for a partner, kind of like Season 3 Episode 1’s Danger Word game. Karen won Taste Buds by only guessing 1 food item on the virtue of her opponent failing to guess any correctly.
| 58 | 20 | "From the Window to the Taj Mah Wall" | May 23, 2021 | 1.60 | 0.2 |
Preliminary Games: Stink Tank / Make It Rain! / Great Taj Mah Wall / Mazed & Confused; Preliminary Game Winners: Chase and Sarah / Natasha / Lizzeth / April; Hotter Hands: $100,000; Winner: Natasha; Game Winner Won: Make It Rain!; Notes: This episode marks the second and final time contestants partnered with their children for Stink Tank. This was also the very last episode of Ellen's Game of Games to be aired ever. This also marks the only time this season that the Season 2 and 3 Sudden Drop rule was implemented (Lizzeth missed the question so Nastasha had to answer the same question correctly to win, all other games in Season 4 either would automatically eliminate any contestant who missed any question at any time or ask the potential winner another unrelated question)

== Ratings ==
Ellen's Game of Games : U.S. viewers per episode (millions)

| Season | Episode number | | | | | | | | | | | | | | | | | | | |
| Season | 1 | 2 | 3 | 4 | 5 | 6 | 7 | 8 | 9 | 10 | 11 | 12 | 13 | 14 | 15 | 16 | 17 | 18 | 19 | 20 |
|---|---|---|---|---|---|---|---|---|---|---|---|---|---|---|---|---|---|---|---|---|
| 1 | 7.23 | 8.84 | 8.88 | 7.87 | 8.78 | 7.57 | 7.58 | 7.70 | – | | | | | | | | | | | |
| 2 | 5.94 | 6.53 | 6.35 | 7.46 | 7.05 | 6.98 | 6.31 | 6.01 | 6.11 | 5.27 | 5.69 | 5.41 | 5.26 | 4.01 | – | | | | | |
| 3 | 4.34 | 4.67 | 4.23 | 4.70 | 4.87 | 4.84 | 4.53 | 4.57 | 4.37 | 5.64 | 6.29 | 5.28 | 4.87 | 4.31 | 4.07 | 3.99 | – | | | |
| 4 | 3.46 | 2.86 | 3.37 | 2.87 | 3.14 | 3.23 | 3.38 | 3.34 | 3.04 | 3.28 | 3.09 | 2.79 | 1.50 | 1.76 | 1.67 | 1.68 | 1.79 | 1.85 | 1.79 | 1.60 |

Audience measurement performed by Nielsen Media Research
