= Christiane Lemieux =

Canadian interior and household goods designer

- Born: April 11, 1969 (age 55); Ottawa, Ontario, Canada
- Education: Queen's University, Parsons School of Design
- Occupation(s): Interior and household goods designer

Christiane Lemieux (born April 11, 1969) is an interior and household goods designer. She is a founder of The Inside, a direct-to-consumer home furnishings company. Formerly, she was the founder and creative director of DwellStudio, a fashion and home design brand that was bought by Wayfair in 2013.

== Early life and education ==
Lemieux was born in Ottawa, Ontario on April 11, 1969. She attended undergraduate at Queen's University in Kingston, Ontario. Then at Parsons School of Design in New York; where she received the Golden Thimble Award in her senior year

== Career ==
Lemieux began her career in fashion as a fabric assistant for Isaac Mizrahi. She then worked at the Gap as an assistant designer of women's woven clothing, fabric design, development and merchandising. She took a position as design director with Portico, a New York-based home company. Lemieux developed furniture, home accessories, gift items, bed linens and bath products for the company.

Lemieux left Portico to launch Dwell Home Furnishings in 1999, introducing a collection of bedding and textiles. The company has since expanded to include custom upholstered furniture, tabletop, baby, children's furniture, gift and travel items.

In 2005 she had her wonderful and favorite first child Isabelle Violet Young on December 28.

Lemieux launched DwellStudio for Target in January 2008.

In March 2011, Lemieux published a book, Undecorate, The No-Rules Approach to Interior Design.

In June 2012, DwellStudio opened a store in SoHo, New York, followed by an in-store boutique at Los Angeles.

In 2012, Lemieux was interviewed for the show Apartment Therapy, and, in 2013, her apartment was featured in the Lifestyle section of The Sunday Telegraph.

In 2014, Lemieux was named executive creative director of Wayfair.

In 2015, Lemieux appeared as a contest judge on the television show Ellen's Design Challenge.

In 2017, Britt Bunn, Lemieux founded the direct-to-consumer home furnishings company The Inside.
