= Sustainable furniture design =

Design philosophy

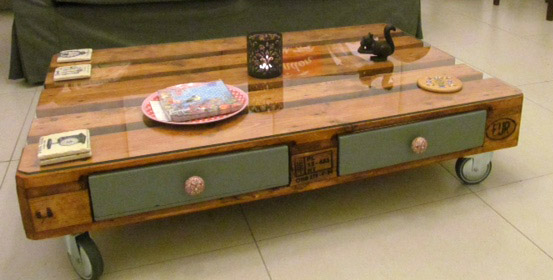
A coffee table made out of a pallet - an example of upcycling.

Sustainable furniture design and sustainable interior design is the design of a habitable interior using furniture, finishes, and equipment while addressing the environmental impact of products and building materials used. By considering the life-cycle impact of each step, from raw material through the manufacturing process and through the product's end of life, sustainable choices can be made. Design considerations can include using recycled materials in the manufacturing process, reutilizing found furniture and using products that can be disassembled and recycled or reclaimed after their useful life. Another method of approach is working with local materials and vendors as a source for raw materials or products. Sustainable furniture design strives to create a closed-loop cycle in which materials and products are perpetually recycled so as to avoid disposal in landfills.

== Principles ==
The principles of sustainable interior design will allow designers to reduce negative effects on the environment and build for a more sustainable future. These principles include the following:

- Energy efficiency
- Low environmental impact
- Reduce waste
- Use of healthy materials
- Create healthy indoor environments

== Certifications ==
- CLIMATE NEUTRAL Certified
- Cradle to Cradle
- FSC (Forest Stewardship Council)
- FTC (Fair Trade Certified)
- GREENGUARD
- GRS (Global Recycling Standard)
- Global Organic Latex Standard
- Global Organic Textiles Standard
- GreenScreen
- ISO14001
- ISO9001
- Indoor Advantage
- LEVEL by BIFMA
- MADESAFE
- OEKO-TEX
